= Miss Universe Democratic Republic of the Congo =

Beauty pageants in Democratic Republic of the Congo

- Formation: 2024; 2 years ago
- Type: Beauty pageant
- Headquarters: Kinshasa
- Location: Democratic Republic of the Congo
- Members: Miss Universe
- Official language: French
- Current titleholder: Jessi Kalambayi
- National Director: Anado Kabika
- Website: www.missuniversedrcongo.com

Miss Universe Democratic Republic of the Congo, also known as Miss Universe DR Congo, is a national beauty pageant to select the representative of the Democratic Republic of the Congo for the Miss Universe competition.

== Titleholders ==
Year	Miss Universe DR Congo	Runners-Up			
Year	Miss Universe DR Congo	First	Second	Third	Fourth
2024	Ilda Amani Dorcas	Aurélie Mwadi	Océane Mpundu	Dalal Hoballah	Eunice Yaosiya
2025	Déborah Djema (Dethroned)	Dorcas Nende	Blandine Nyota	Not awarded	
2026	Jessi Kalambayi	Dorcas Mubalama	Pitay Manson	Not awarded	

== International placements ==
- : Declared the winner
- : Finished as a runner-up or top 5/6 qualification
- : Finished as one of the finalists or semifinalists
- : Finished as a special awards winner

=== DR Congo representatives at Miss Universe ===
Year	Miss DR Congo	Placement at Miss Universe	Special award	Note
2026	Jessi Kalambayi	TBA		Previously Miss Colorado USA 2024, Top 10 at Miss USA 2024.
2025	Dorcas Dienda Kasinde	Unplaced		Previously, Miss Africa 2018.
2025	Déborah Djema	Did not compete		Djema no longer holds the title due to dethronement.
2024	Ilda Amani Dorcas	Unplaced		Previously, Miss Africa Congo 2019.
Did not compete between 1987—2023: Before 1997, D.R. Congo competed as Miss Zaire at Miss Universe competition.
1986	Aimée Dobala	Top 10		
1985	Benita Murekatete	2nd Runner-Up		
1984	Lokange Lwali	Unplaced		
Did not compete between 1973—1983
1972	Ombayi Mukuta	Unplaced	Miss Congeniality	
1971	Martine Mualuke	Unplaced		
1970	Marie-Josée Basoko	Unplaced		
1969	Jeanne Mokomo	Unplaced		
1968	Elizabeth Tavares	Unplaced		

=== DR Congo representatives at Miss Cosmo ===
Year	Miss DR Congo	Placement at Miss Cosmo	Special award	Note
2025	Dorcas Nende	Unplaced		She was the first runner-up at Miss Universe DR Congo 2025.
