= Miss USA 2012 =

61st Miss USA pageant

- Date: June 3, 2012
- Presenters: Andy Cohen; Giuliana Rancic; Jeannie Mai; Kelly Osbourne
- Entertainment: Akon; Cobra Starship
- Venue: The AXIS, Paradise, Nevada
- Broadcaster: NBC (KSNV-DT); Telemundo (KBLR)
- Entrants: 51
- Placements: 16
- Winner: Olivia Culpo (Rhode Island) (Relinquished); Nana Meriwether (Maryland)(Succeeded)

Miss USA 2012 was the 61st Miss USA pageant, held on June 3, 2012, at The AXIS, located inside the Planet Hollywood Las Vegas in Paradise, Nevada, and it was televised live on NBC. Alyssa Campanella of California crowned her successor Olivia Culpo of Rhode Island at the end of the event. This was Rhode Island's first Miss USA title. Culpo represented the United States at Miss Universe 2012 six months later and went on to win the Miss Universe title, becoming the eighth American to do so.

After Olivia Culpo won Miss Universe 2012, as a customary, first runner-up Nana Meriwether of Maryland inherited the Miss USA title and was officially crowned on January 9, 2013. Meriwether became the second woman from Maryland to hold the Miss USA title; the first, Mary Leona Gage, was dethroned shortly after winning.

For the first time, a question was solicited from Twitter for the final question asked of one of the five finalists. That question picked by the pageant organizers - "Would you feel it would be fair that a transgender woman wins the Miss USA title over a natural-born woman?" - was answered by the winner, Culpo.

== Background ==
=== Selection of contestants ===
One delegate from each state and the District of Columbia was chosen in state pageants held which began in July 2011 and ended in January 2012. The first state pageant was Florida, held on July 16, 2011, as scheduled. The final pageant was Nevada, held on January 29, 2012.

Eight delegates are former Miss Teen USA state winners, while one is a former Miss America state winner and the other one competed in Miss Earth United States.

=== Preliminary round ===
Prior to the final telecast, the delegates competed in the preliminary competition, which involves private interviews with the judges and a presentation show where they compete in swimsuit and evening gown. The preliminary competition took place on May 30, 2012, at 10 pm (ET) hosted by Chet Buchanan and Alyssa Campanella, and was broadcast online over Xbox Live via their YouTube and MSN applications.

=== Finals ===
During the final competition, the top sixteen competed in swimsuit, while the top ten competed evening gown, and the top five competed in the final question signed up by a panel of judges. The sixteenth semifinalist was determined by voting online.

== Results ==
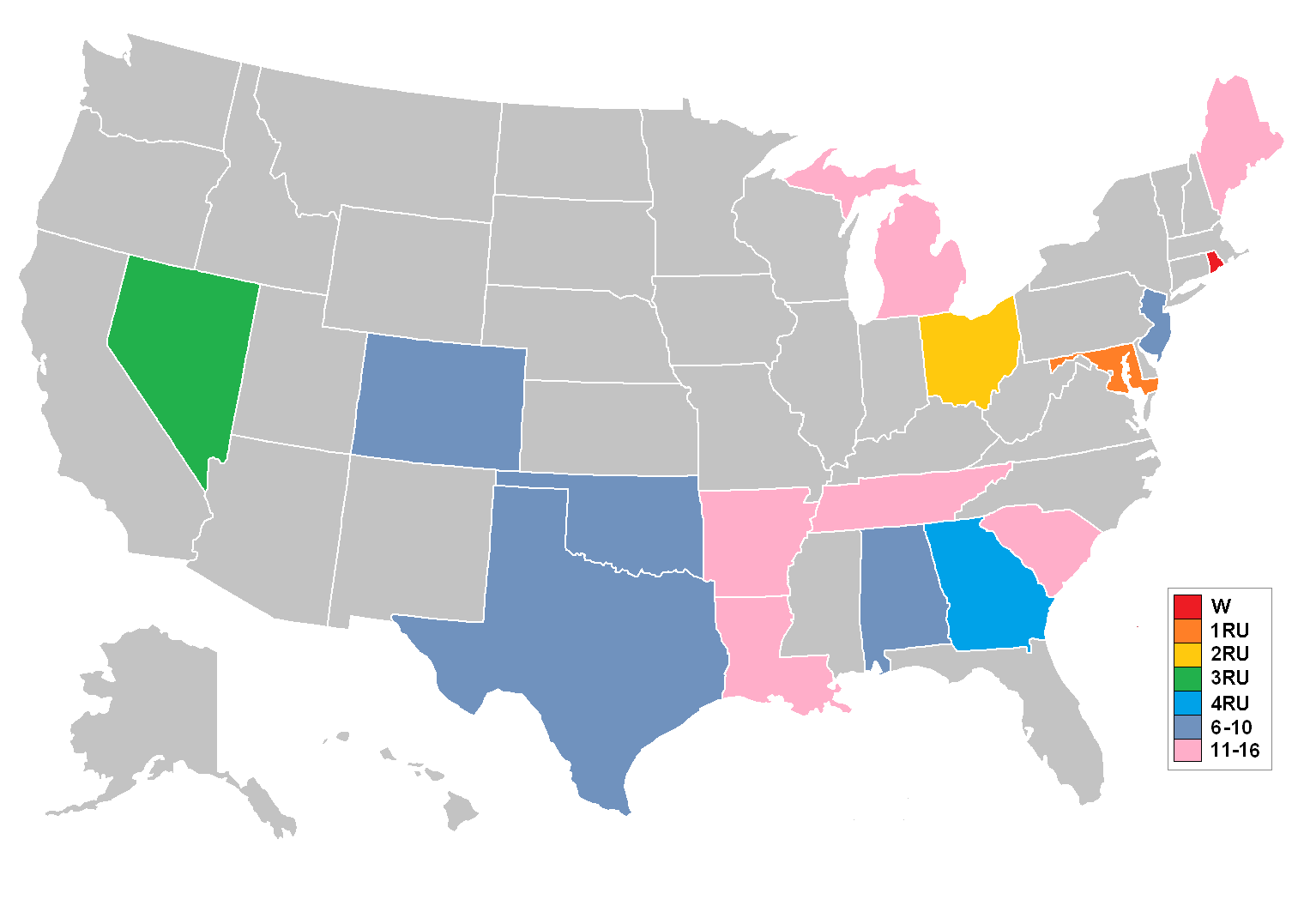
Miss USA 2012 results

=== Placements ===
Placement	Contestant
Miss USA 2012	Rhode Island – Olivia Culpo
1st Runner-Up	Maryland – Nana Meriwether ∞
2nd Runner-Up	Ohio – Audrey Bolte
3rd Runner-Up	Nevada – Jade Kelsall
4th Runner-Up	Georgia – Jazz Wilkins
Top 10	Alabama – Katherine Webb; Colorado – Marybel Gonzalez; New Jersey – Michelle Leonardo; Oklahoma – Lauren Lundeen; Texas – Brittany Booker
Top 16	Arkansas – Kelsey Dow ‡; Louisiana – Erin Edmiston; Maine – Rani Williamson; Michigan – Kristen Danyal; South Carolina – Erika Powell; Tennessee – Jessica Hibler

‡ Voted into Top 16 as America's Choice via Internet

∞ Culpo won Miss Universe 2012. Due to protocol, Culpo relinquished her title as Miss USA 2012. 1st runner-up, Nana Meriwether, succeeded her as Miss USA.

== Delegates ==
State/district	Contestant	Hometown	Age (Note: Ages at the time of the pageant)	Height	Placement	Notes
Alabama	Katherine Webb	Phenix City	23	5 ft 11 in (180 cm)	Top 10	Contestant in Splash
Alaska	Jessica Kazmierczak	Salcha	22	5 ft 9 in (175 cm)		
Arizona	Erika Frantzve	Scottsdale	23	5 ft 8 in (173 cm)		Now known as Erika Kirk
Arkansas	Kelsey Dow	Jonesboro	21	5 ft 7 in (170 cm)	Top 16 (Note: Voted per America's Choice internet/SMS)	
California	Natalie Pack	Palos Verdes	23	6 ft 0 in (183 cm)		Contestant on America's Next Top Model, Cycle 12
Colorado	Marybel Gonzalez	Denver	24	5 ft 6 in (168 cm)	Top 10	
Connecticut	Marie Lynn Piscitelli	North Haven	26	5 ft 6 in (168 cm)		Previously Miss Connecticut Teen USA 2001
Delaware	Krista Clausen	Georgetown	19	5 ft 6 in (168 cm)		
District of Columbia	Monique Tompkins	Washington	23	5 ft 6 in (168 cm)		
Florida	Karina Brez	Wellington	23	5 ft 8 in (173 cm)		
Georgia	Jasmyn "Jazz" Wilkins	Johns Creek	21	5 ft 11 in (180 cm)	4th runner-up	Daughter of former basketball player Gerald Wilkins and brother of Damien Wilkins
Hawaii	Brandie Cazimero	Kaneohe	26	5 ft 9 in (175 cm)		
Idaho	Erna Palic	Boise	25	5 ft 7 in (170 cm)		
Illinois	Ashley Hooks	Flossmoor	25	5 ft 8 in (173 cm)		
Indiana	Megan Myrehn	Carmel	21	5 ft 7 in (170 cm)		Previously Miss Virginia Teen USA 2008
Iowa	Rebecca Hodge	Iowa City	22	5 ft 4 in (163 cm)		
Kansas	Gentry Miller	Overland Park	24	5 ft 6 in (168 cm)		Previously Miss Kansas Teen USA 2006
Kentucky	Amanda Mertz	Louisville	25	5 ft 6 in (168 cm)		
Louisiana	Erin Edmiston	Lafayette	22	5 ft 7 in (170 cm)	Top 16	
Maine	Rani Williamson	Portland	25	5 ft 6 in (168 cm)	Top 16	Later resigned
Maryland	Nana Meriwether	Potomac	27	6 ft 0 in (183 cm)	1st runner-up	Later assumed Miss USA 2012 after Culpo won Miss Universe 2012
Massachusetts	Natalie Pietrzak	Boston	26	5 ft 9 in (175 cm)		
Michigan	Kristen Danyal	Detroit	21	5 ft 7 in (170 cm)	Top 16	Previously Miss Michigan Teen USA 2009
Minnesota	Nitaya Panemalaythong	Savage	26	5 ft 8 in (173 cm)		Born in Thailand
Mississippi	Myverick Garcia	Hattiesburg	22	5 ft 4 in (163 cm)		
Missouri	Katie Kearney	St. Louis	23	5 ft 11 in (180 cm)		
Montana	Autumn Muller	Billings	25	5 ft 8 in (173 cm)		Previously Miss Montana Teen USA 2004
Nebraska	Amy Spilker	Malcolm	22	5 ft 8 in (173 cm)		
Nevada	Jade Kelsall	Eneterprise	26	5 ft 9 in (175 cm)	3rd runner-up	
New Hampshire	Ryanne Harms	Rochester	23	5 ft 7 in (170 cm)		
New Jersey	Michelle Leonardo	Tinton Falls	20	5 ft 7 in (170 cm)	Top 10	Previously Miss New Jersey Teen USA 2008
New Mexico	Jessica Martin	Las Cruces	21	5 ft 6 in (168 cm)		Previously Miss New Mexico Earth 2010
New York	Johanna Sambucini	Brooklyn	25	5 ft 7 in (170 cm)		
North Carolina	Sydney Perry	Wrightsville Beach	21	5 ft 7 in (170 cm)		Previously Miss Vermont Teen USA 2008
North Dakota	Jaci Stofferahn	Fargo	23	5 ft 6 in (168 cm)		
Ohio	Audrey Bolte	Batavia	23	5 ft 10 in (178 cm)	2nd runner-up	
Oklahoma	Lauren Lundeen	Edmond	20	5 ft 10 in (178 cm)	Top 10	
Oregon	Alaina Bergsma	Eugene	22	6 ft 3 in (191 cm)		
Pennsylvania	Sheena Monnin	Cranberry Township	27	5 ft 7 in (170 cm)		Later resigned
Rhode Island	Olivia Culpo	Cranston	20	5 ft 7 in (170 cm)	Miss USA 2012	Later Miss Universe 2012
South Carolina	Erika Powell	Greenville	27	5 ft 6 in (168 cm)	Top 16	Previously Miss South Carolina 2005
South Dakota	Taylor Neisen	Rapid City	20	5 ft 9 in (175 cm)		
Tennessee	Jessica Hibler	Nashville	23	5 ft 6 in (168 cm)	Top 16	
Texas	Brittany Booker	Houston	21	5 ft 11 in (180 cm)	Top 10	
Utah	Kendyl Bell	Sandy	25	5 ft 8 in (173 cm)		
Vermont	Jamie Dragon	Stowe	26	5 ft 8 in (173 cm)		
Virginia	Catherine Muldoon	Virginia Beach	26	5 ft 7 in (170 cm)		Previously Miss New York Teen USA 2004
Washington	Christina Clarke	Sammamish	22	5 ft 6 in (168 cm)		
West Virginia	Andrea Rogers	Martinsburg	24	5 ft 11 in (180 cm)		
Wisconsin	Emily Guerin	Monroe	23	5 ft 6 in (168 cm)		
Wyoming	Holly Allen	Lander	24	5 ft 8 in (173 cm)		Later a contestant on Big Brother 21
