= Nana Meriwether =

American athlete and beauty pageant titleholder

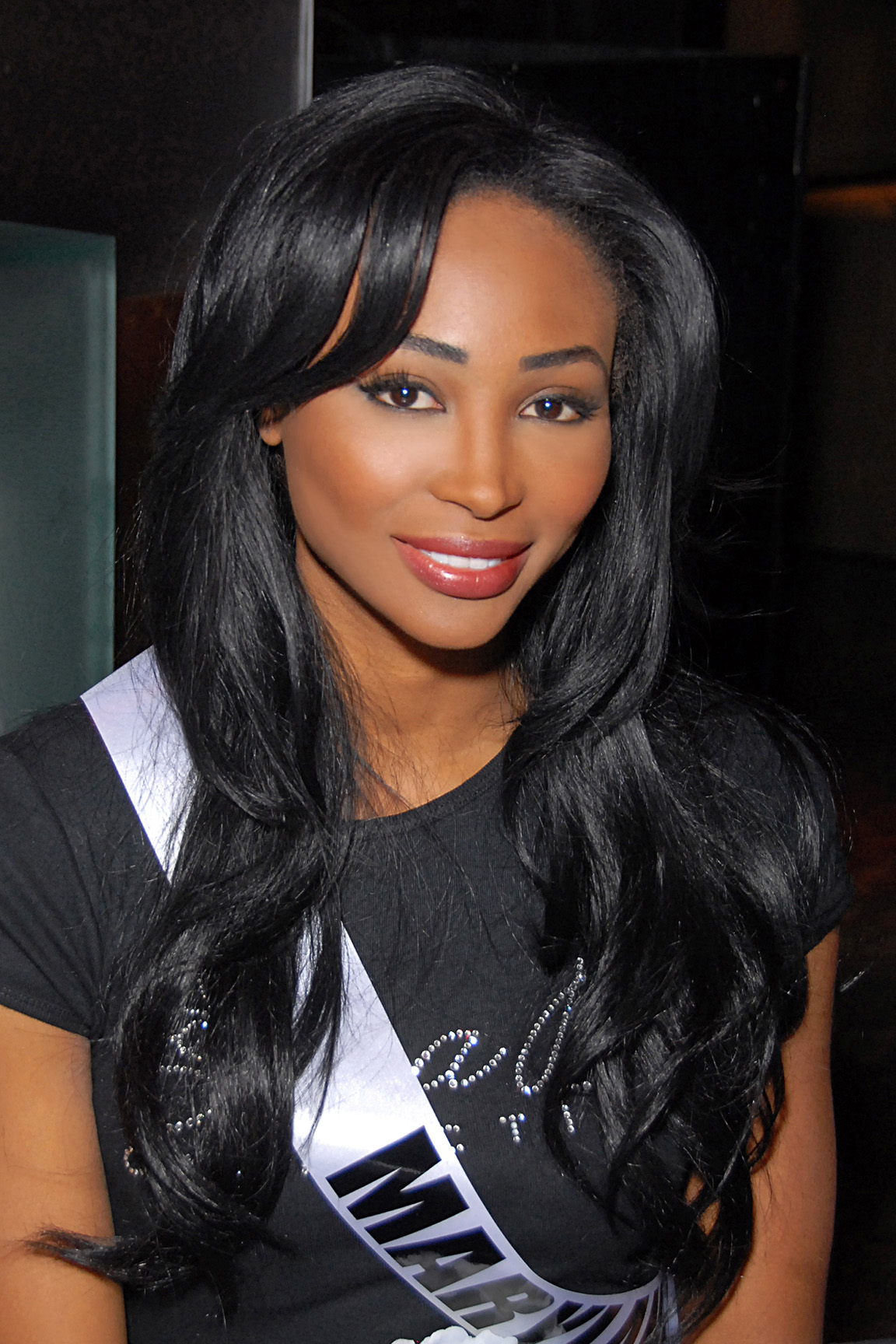
- Meriwether in 2012
- Born: May 24, 1985 (age 41); Acornhoek, South Africa
- Education: Duke University; University of California, Los Angeles (BA); University of Southern California (BS)
- Beauty pageant titleholder
- Title: Miss Maryland USA 2012; Miss USA 2012
- Major competitions: Miss Maryland USA 2012; (Winner); Miss USA 2012; (1st Runner-Up) (Note: Meriwether was originally first runner-up, but became Miss USA after the original titleholder, Olivia Culpo, won Miss Universe. Due to pageant protocol, Miss USA must relinquish her title in the event she wins Miss Universe.)

Nana Meriwether (born May 24, 1985) is an American former professional volleyball player and beauty pageant titleholder. She competed at Miss USA 2012, representing Maryland, and finished as the first runner-up. On December 19, 2012, winner Olivia Culpo won Miss Universe 2012, and Meriwether assumed the title of Miss USA three weeks later.

She is also the cofounder of the nonprofit organization the Meriwether Foundation, and a two-time All-American volleyball player at University of California, Los Angeles.

== Life and career ==
=== Early life ===
Meriwether was born on May 24, 1985, in Acornhoek, Tintswalo Hospital, South Africa. Her father is Delano Meriwether, the first African-American student at Duke University School of Medicine, and her mother, Nomvimbi Meriwether, is South African and works as a lawyer. Her parents had been doing volunteer work in South Africa at the time of Meriwether's birth. She was raised in Potomac, Maryland and graduated from Sidwell Friends School in Washington, D.C.

Meriwether played volleyball at Duke University for one semester. She later transferred to the University of California, Los Angeles, where she was named a two-time NCAA All-American volleyball player and graduated with a degree in political science. After graduating, Meriwether played volleyball professionally for Las Indias de Mayagüez in Puerto Rico, and trained for the United States women's national volleyball team for the 2008 Summer Olympics. She later completed a degree in premedical sciences at the University of Southern California.

=== Pageantry ===
==== State titles ====
Meriwether's first pageant was Miss California USA 2008, representing Malibu, but she didn't reach the semifinals. Meriwether returned to Miss California USA in 2009, representing Beverly Hills, where she finished as the third runner-up to Carrie Prejean. Meriwether competed in Miss California USA 2010 and finished as first runner-up. She competed in the Miss California USA for the final time in 2011, where she finished as fourth runner-up. After competing in Miss California USA for four years, Meriwether returned to her home state of Maryland, and entered Miss Maryland USA 2012. She won the title and received the right to represent the state at Miss USA.

==== Miss USA 2012 ====
Meriwether represented Maryland at Miss USA 2012, where she eventually finished as the first runner-up to Olivia Culpo of Rhode Island. On December 19, 2012, Olivia Culpo won the title of Miss Universe 2012. Due to pageant protocol, Miss USA must resign her title in order to fulfill her duties as Miss Universe. The first runner-up assumes the title of Miss USA, meaning that Meriwether became the new Miss USA 2012 three weeks later.

=== Other ventures ===
Meriwether is a cofounder of the Meriwether Foundation, which she runs along with the members of her family. The organization operates programs in health, education, nutrition, and development in rural and impoverished communities of Southern Africa. Meriwether worked as an executive assistant to Glenda Bailey, the editor-in-chief of Harper's Bazaar. She has worked for and contributed to Carine Roitfeld's CR Fashion Book, Vanity Fair, and Vogue Australia.

== Notes ==
Awards and achievements
Preceded by Olivia Culpo	Miss USA; 2012	Succeeded by Erin Brady
Preceded by Allyn Rose	Miss Maryland USA; 2012	Succeeded by Kasey Staniszewski
