= Carrie Sheffield =

American journalist and television personality

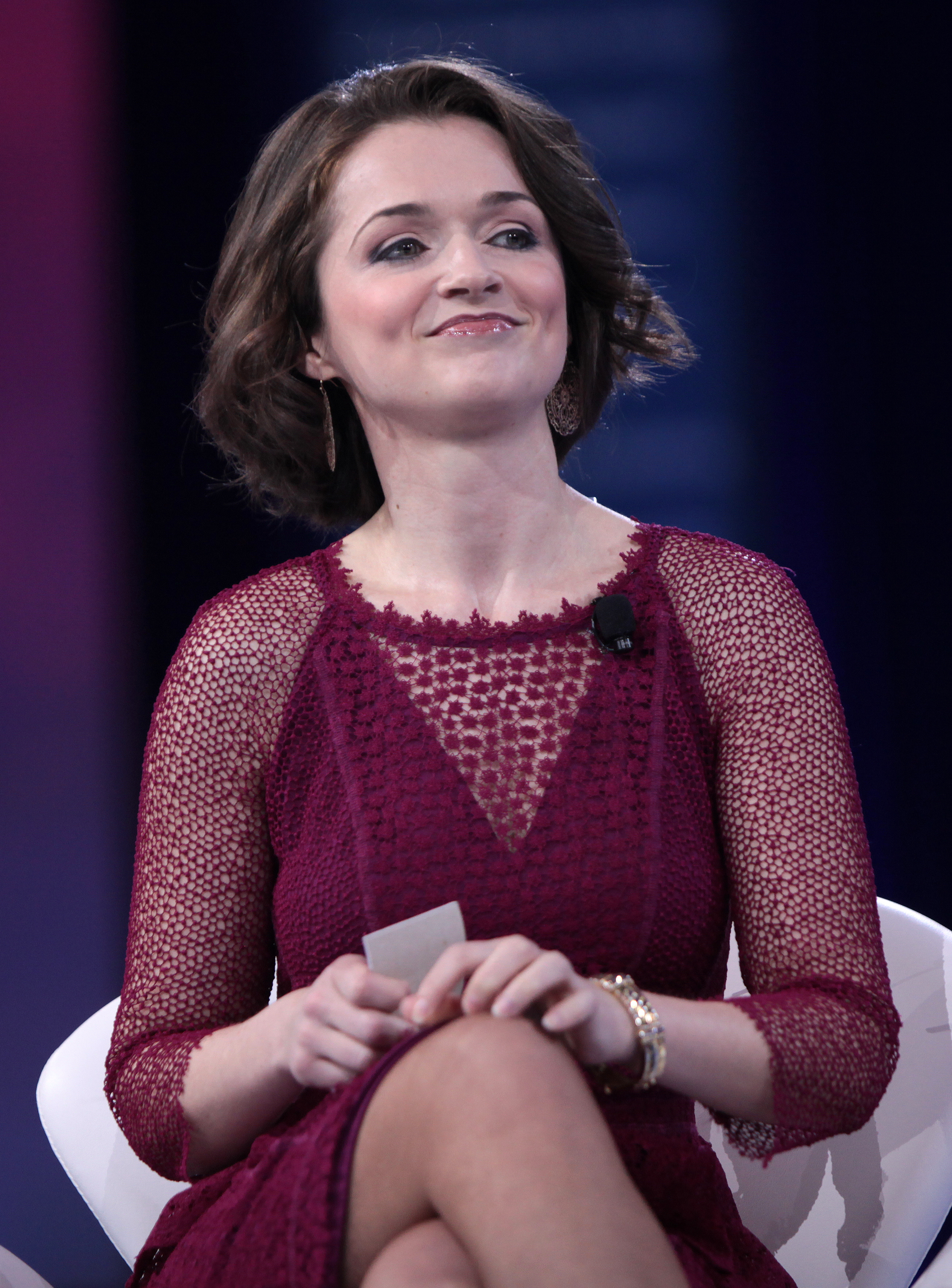
- Born: Carrie Esther Sheffield; February 15, 1983 (age 43); Fairfax, Virginia, U.S.
- Education: Brigham Young University (B.A.); Harvard University (M.P.P.)
- Occupations: Columnist, broadcaster, policy analyst
- Political party: Republican
- Relatives: Charlotte Sheffield (paternal aunt)
- Awards: Fulbright Fellowship
- Website: carriesheffield.com

Carrie Sheffield is an American columnist, broadcaster, policy analyst, and government official.

== Early life and education ==
Sheffield was born on February 15, 1983 in Fairfax, Virginia. Both of her parents come from multigenerational Mormon families, but Sheffield's father was eventually excommunicated from the official LDS Church. Sheffield is the paternal niece of beauty queen Charlotte Sheffield, former Miss USA. Sheffield's childhood was marked by her father's financial dysfunction and abuse, as well as the challenges of having two older brothers with schizophrenia; she left home before starting university.

Sheffield earned a B.A. in communications from Brigham Young University in 2005 and completed a Fulbright Fellowship in Berlin. She also holds a master's degree in public policy from Harvard University.

== Career ==
Sheffield formerly worked for syndicated columnist Robert Novak before joining the editorial board of The Washington Times under Tony Blankley, writing editorials on domestic and foreign policy and politics.

She was formerly a reporter for Politico and The Hill.

Sheffield worked as a credit risk manager at Goldman Sachs and bond analyst at Moody's Investors Service and testified before the U.S. Congress as an expert witness on economic policy issues. She later conducted research for Edward Conard, an economist at the American Enterprise Institute, and served as the Warren Brookes Journalism Fellow at the Competitive Enterprise Institute.

She has published in The Wall Street Journal, TIME, USA Today, CNN Opinion, The New York Times, The Washington Post, CNBC, National Review, The D.C. Examiner, Newsweek, HuffPost, and Daily Caller.

She is the author of a 2024 memoir, Motorhome Prophecies: A Journey of Healing and Forgiveness, published by Hachette Book Group.

She managed billions of dollars in risk at Wall Street firms, and competed in a Miss USA system beauty pageant.

== Government service ==
In November 2025, Virginia Governor Glenn Youngkin appointed Sheffield to the Virginia state Board for Professional and Occupational Regulation for a term ending June 30, 2028. In January 2026, she was unanimously elected Vice Chair of the Virginia state Board for Professional and Occupational Regulation.

== Personal life ==
Sheffield formally left the LDS Church in 2010 and eventually became an agnostic. She was subsequently baptized in the Episcopal Church in Manhattan under the spiritual guidance of Presiding Bishop Michael Curry. She now attends "a Bible-believing, nondenominational church in the Washington, D.C., area."

She was a traveling enthusiast and visited every continent, including Antarctica, before age 30. She ran the Marine Corps Marathon and won the National Press Club 5K three times.
