= Miss Maryland USA =

Beauty pageant competition

- Formation: 1952
- Type: Beauty pageant
- Headquarters: Clermont
- Location: Florida
- Members: Miss USA
- Official language: English
- Key people: Deborah Miller; Cindy Provost
- Website: Official website

The Miss Maryland USA competition is the pageant that selects the representative for the state Maryland in the Miss USA pageant. The pageant is directed by D&D Productions.

The first Miss USA winner from Maryland, Mary Leona Gage, won Miss USA 1957. However, she was later discovered to be a mother of two sons and was therefore dethroned. In 2012, Nana Meriwether placed 1st runner-up, but became Miss USA 2012 when Olivia Culpo won Miss Universe 2012.

Seven Maryland titleholders are former Miss Maryland Teen USAs. These four all reigned in the early 1990s, and in fact four out of seven titleholders from 1990 to 1995 were former teens. Only four Miss Maryland USA has competed at Miss America.

From 2006 to 2008, each woman who won Miss Maryland USA was the previous year's first runner-up.

Holly Plank of Baltimore was crowned Miss Maryland USA 2026 on July 26, 2026 at Hilton Parsippany in Parsippany. She will represent Maryland at Miss USA 2026.

== Gallery of titleholders ==
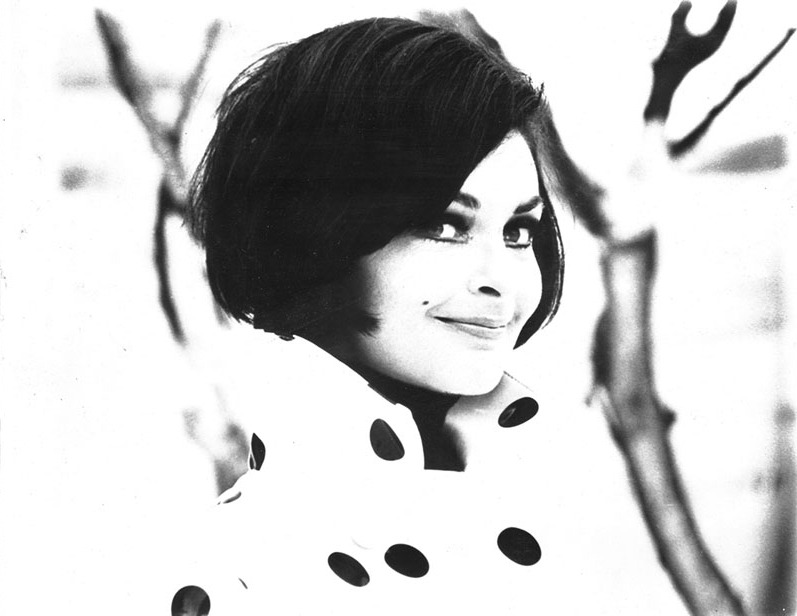
Mary Leona Gage, Miss Maryland USA 1957 & Miss USA 1957

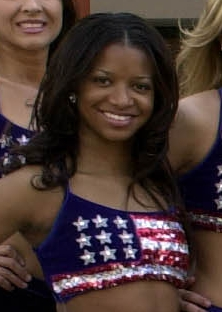
Michaé Holloman, Miss Maryland USA 2007

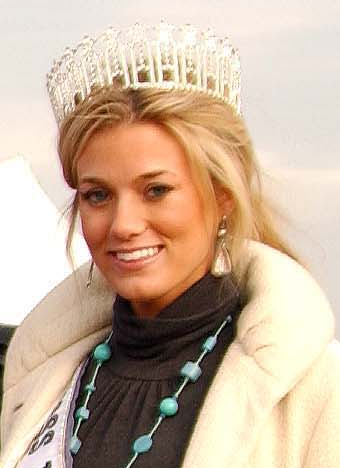
Casandra Tressler, Miss Maryland USA 2008

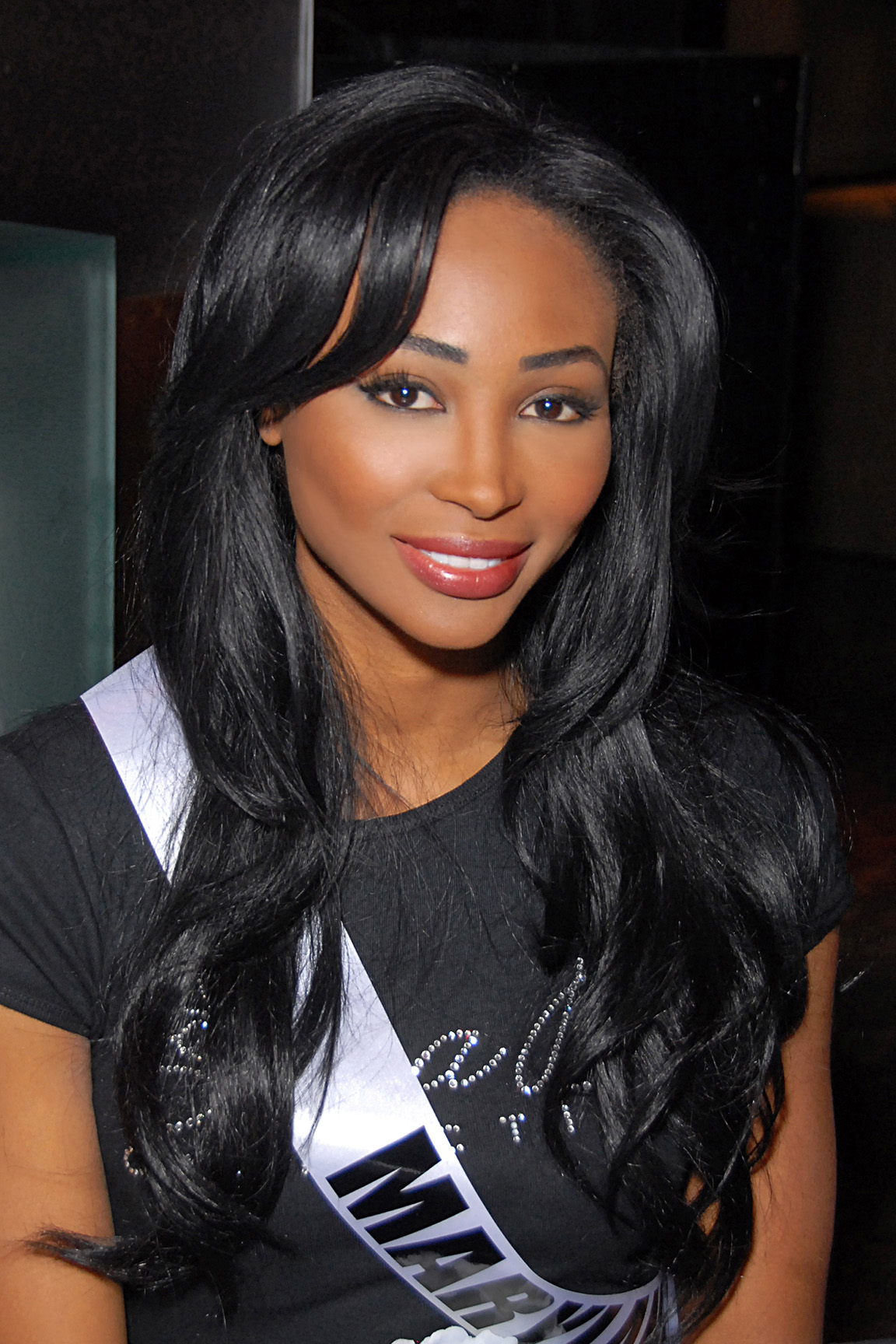
Nana Meriwether, Miss Maryland USA 2012. She later assumed the Miss USA 2012 title after Olivia Culpo won Miss Universe 2012

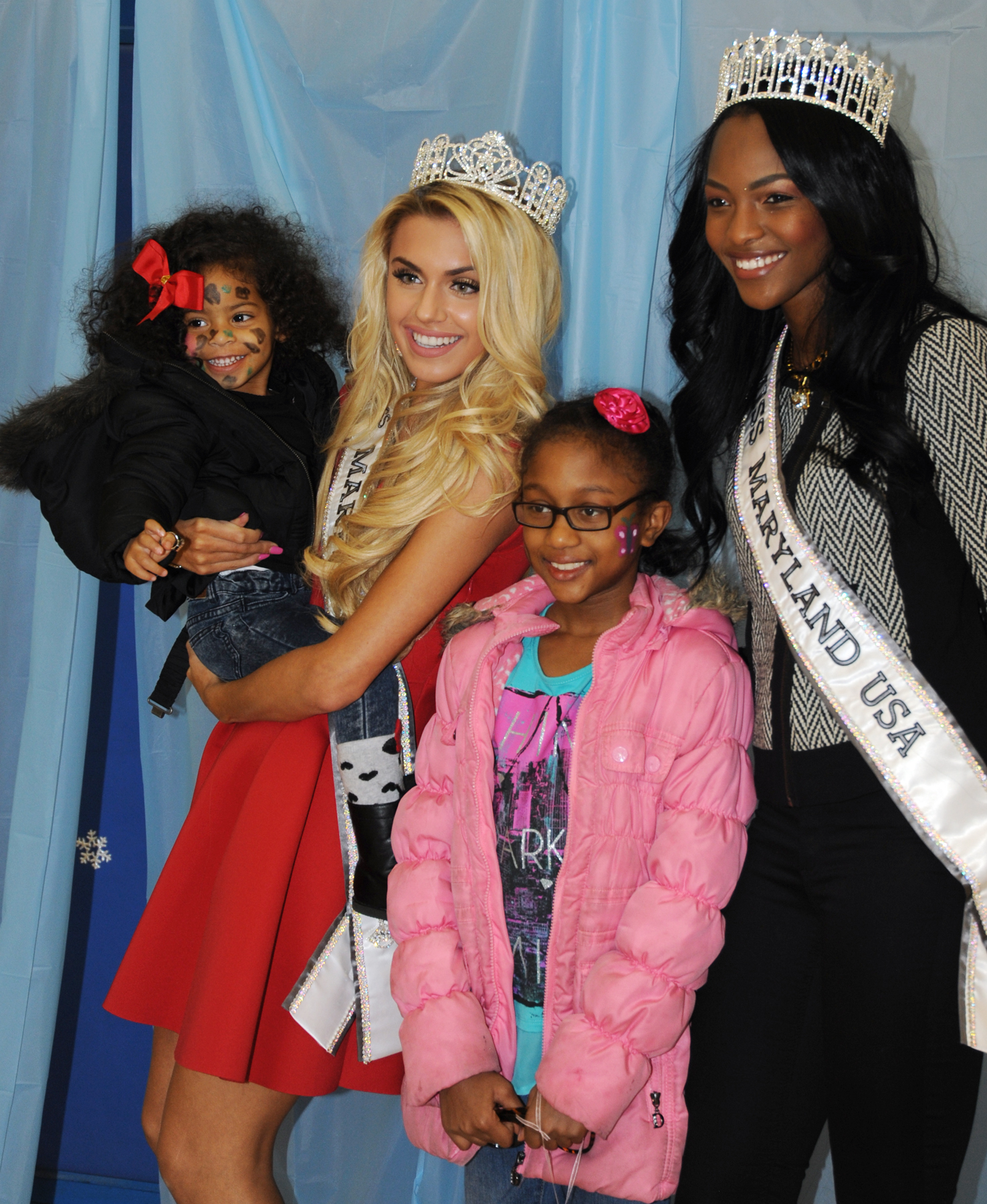
Taylor Dawson, Miss Maryland Teen USA 2015 and Mamé Adjei, Miss Maryland USA 2015 at an event for military families

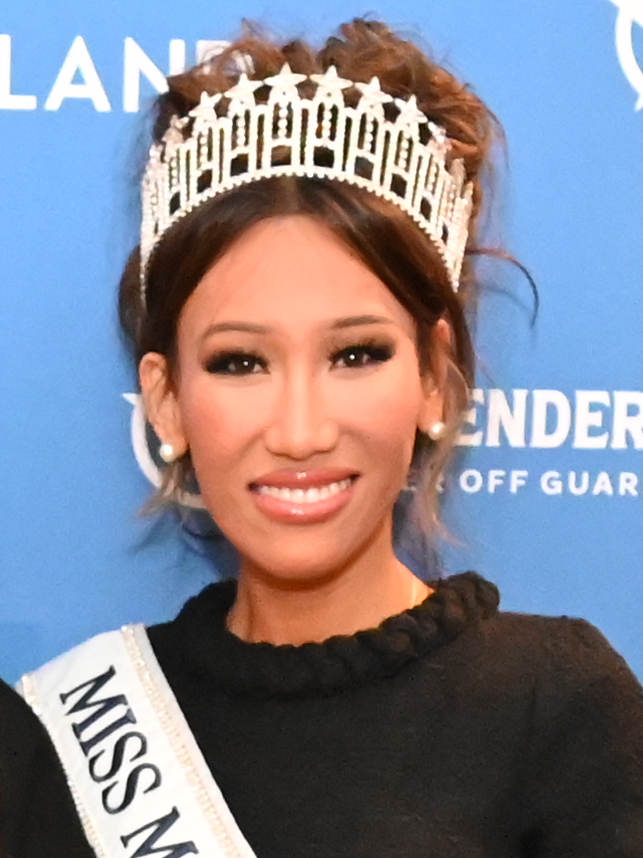
Bailey Anne Kennedy, Miss Maryland USA 2024

== Results summary ==
=== Miss USA placements ===
- Miss USAs: Mary Leona Gage (1957) (Note: Mary Leona Gage was later dethroned when she was discovered that she was married and had two children.)
- 1st runners-up: Paulette Reck (1968), Nana Meriwether (2012) (Note: Nana Meriwether was 1st runner-up at Miss USA, but succeeded the title when Olivia Culpo became Miss Universe.)
- 4th runners-up: Betty Jo Grove (1973), Mamé Adjei (2015)
- Top 8/10/12: Carol Theis (1971), Tonja Walker (1980), Linda Lambert (1981), Angie Boyer (1982), Rowann Brewer (1988), Jennifer Wilhoit (1995), Marina Harrison (2005), Allyn Rose (2011), Taylor Burton (2014), Mariela Pepin (2019), Layilah Nasser (2021)
- Top 15/20: Barbara Eschenburg (1954), Charlene Holt (1956), Diane White (1959), Royette Tarry (1964), Roselaine Zetter (1966), Sandy Clevering (1967), Kasey Staniszewski (2013), Brittinay Nicolette (2018), Savena Mushinge (2023)

Maryland holds a record of 25 placements at Miss USA.

=== Awards ===
- Miss Photogenic: Rowann Brewer (1988)
- Style Award: Megan Gunning (2001)

== Winners ==
Color key

- Declared as Winner
- Ended as runner-up
- Ended as one of the finalists or semifinalists

Year	Name	Hometown	Age (Note: Age at the time of the Miss USA pageant)	Local title	Placement at Miss USA	Special awards at Miss USA	Notes
2026	Holly Plank	Baltimore	35	Miss Baltimore			
2025	Lexia Gillette	Chevy Chase	29	Miss Chevy Chase			
2024	Bailey Anne Kennedy	Williamsport	31	Miss Williamsport			First trans woman to win the title.
2023	Savena Mushinge	Germantown	26	Miss Germantown	Top 20		Previously Miss Supranational Zambia 2022
2022	Caleigh Shade	Cumberland	22				Previously Miss Maryland Teen USA 2018; Top 15 at Miss Teen USA 2018
2021	Layilah Nasser	Montgomery Village	26		Top 8		
2020	Taelyr Robinson	Annapolis	27				Minor part in The Vineyard; Represented USA at Miss Model of the World 2016; Longest reigning Miss Maryland USA (1 year, 8 months, and 15 days)
2019	Mariela Pepin	Severn	23		Top 10		Born in Puerto Rico; Previously Miss Maryland Teen USA 2014; Previously Top 10 finalist at Miss World America 2017; Later contestant on season 25 of The Bachelor and season 7 of Bachelor in Paradise.; Later Miss Intercontinental Puerto Rico 2022 and 1st runner-up at Miss Intercontinental 2022
2018	Brittinay Nicolette	Fallston	26		Top 15		
2017	Adrianna David	Rockville	22	Miss University of Maryland			Later Miss Maryland 2018
2016	Christina Denny	Owings Mills	25				Previously Miss Maryland 2013; Top 10 at Miss America 2014; Represented Maryland at Miss World America 2016; Top 12 at Miss World America 2016; Previously Miss Globe United States 2017; 1st runner-up at Miss Globe International 2017
2015	Mamé Adjei	Silver Spring	23		4th runner-up		1st runner-up on America's Next Top Model Cycle 22
2014	Taylor Burton	La Plata	25		Top 10		
2013	Kasey Staniszewski	Annapolis	21		Top 15		Triple crown winner: Previously Miss Maryland's Outstanding Teen 2007; Previously Miss Maryland Teen USA 2009; 3rd runner-up to Miss Teen USA 2009
2012	Nana Meriwether	Potomac	27		1st runner-up		Became Miss USA 2012 after Olivia Culpo became Miss Universe 2012; Born in South Africa
2011	Allyn Rose	Newburg	22		Top 8		Later Miss District of Columbia 2012; Later Miss U.S. Supranational 2014; 3rd Runner-up at Miss Supranational 2014
2010	Simone Feldman	North Potomac	23				
2009	Gabrielle Carlson	Marion Station	24				
2008	Casandra Tressler	Damascus	22				Later Miss U.S. International 2010
2007	Michaé Holloman	Fort Washington	25				Cheerleader for Washington Redskins
2006	Melissa DiGiulian	Bowie	20				
2005	Marina Harrison	Severn	24		Top 10		Previously Miss Maryland 2003; 3rd runner-up at Miss America 2004 pageant
2004	Tia Shorts	Gaithersburg	24				
2003	Jamie Kramer	Pasadena					
2002	Mistie Renee Adams	Silver Spring					
2001	Megan Gunning	Fallston				Style Award	
2000	Christie S. Davis	Silver Spring					Sister of Wendy Davis, Miss Maryland USA 1994
1999	Kelly Donohue	Union Bridge					
1998	Maria Lynn Sheriff	Bowie					
1997	Ann Coale	Baltimore					
1996	Michele Michael	Annapolis					
1995	Jennifer Danielle Wilhoit	Annapolis	22		Top 12		Previously Miss Maryland Teen USA 1991
1994	Wendy Davis	Silver Spring					Sister of Christy Davis, Miss Maryland USA 2000
1993	Mary Ann Cimino	Baltimore					Previously Miss Maryland Teen USA 1990
1992	Renee Rebstock	Pasadena					Previously Miss Maryland Teen USA 1987
1991	Lisa Marie Lawson	Crofton					
1990	Julie Stanford	Edgewater					Previously Miss Maryland Teen USA 1986
1989	Jackie Carroll	Gaithersburg					
1988	Rowanne Brewer	Silver Spring	23		Semi-finalist	Miss Photogenic	Married rock musician Jani Lane
1987	Michelle Snow	Germantown					
1986	Kelly Koehler	Churchton					
1985	Christine Marie	Baldwin					
1984	Betsy Cook	Bethesda					
1983	Shawn Keller	Ashton					
1982	Angie Boyer	Dunkirk	18		Semi-finalist		
1981	Linda Susan Lambert	Baltimore	22		Semi-finalist		
1980	Tonja Annette Walker	Kingsville	19		Top 12		Previously Miss Teen All American 1979
1979	Jean Bourne	Silver Spring					
1978	Rhonda Koch	Brookeville					Unplaced at Miss World USA 1976, as Miss District of Columbia World.
1977	Twyla Littleton	Oxon Hill					
1976	Linda Lee Potter	Adelphi					
1975	Ellen Bowie	Templeville					
1974	Mary Jo Ruppert	College Park					
1973	Betty Jo Grove	College Park	19		4th runner-up		
1972	Patty Townsend	Silver Spring					
1971	Carol Jeanne Theis	Silver Spring	20		Semi-finalist		
1970	Beckie Price	Camp Springs					
1969	Ardis Fowler	Ellicott City					
1968	Paulette Reck	Perry Hall	20	Miss Perry Hall	1st runner-up	Top 15 Best in Swimsuit	2nd runner up at Miss World USA 1969
1967	Sandra Clevering	Silver Spring	19		Semi-finalist		
1966	Roselaine Zetter	Bowie	22		Semi-finalist		
1965	Barbara Kiefer	Baltimore					
1964	Royette Michele Tarry	Baltimore	19		Semi-finalist		Represented Delaware in Miss World USA 1970
1963	Marsha Barbara Metrinko	Laurel					Represented New York City at the Miss America 1964 pageant; Sister of Michele Metrinko, Miss District of Columbia USA 1963 and United States representative at Miss World
1962	Shelda Farley	Catonsville					
1961	Gail Baxter	High Point					
1960	Jerri Fiorilli	Baltimore					
1959	Diane Dolores White	Baltimore	24		Semi-finalist		3rd runner up at Miss World USA 1961; Mother of Miss Georgia USA 1989
1958	Patricia Vogts	Silver Spring					
1957	Mary Leona Gage	Glen Burnie	18		Miss USA 1957		Dethroned after it was discovered she was married and had two children
1956	Charlene Holt	Annapolis	28		Semi-finalist		
1955	Gloria Ruth King	Baltimore					
1954	Barbara Eschenburg	Berlin			Semi-finalist		Disqualified (under age)
1953	Diane Gale Durham	Silver Spring					
1952	Did not compete						
