= Charlotte Sheffield =

American model (1937–2016)

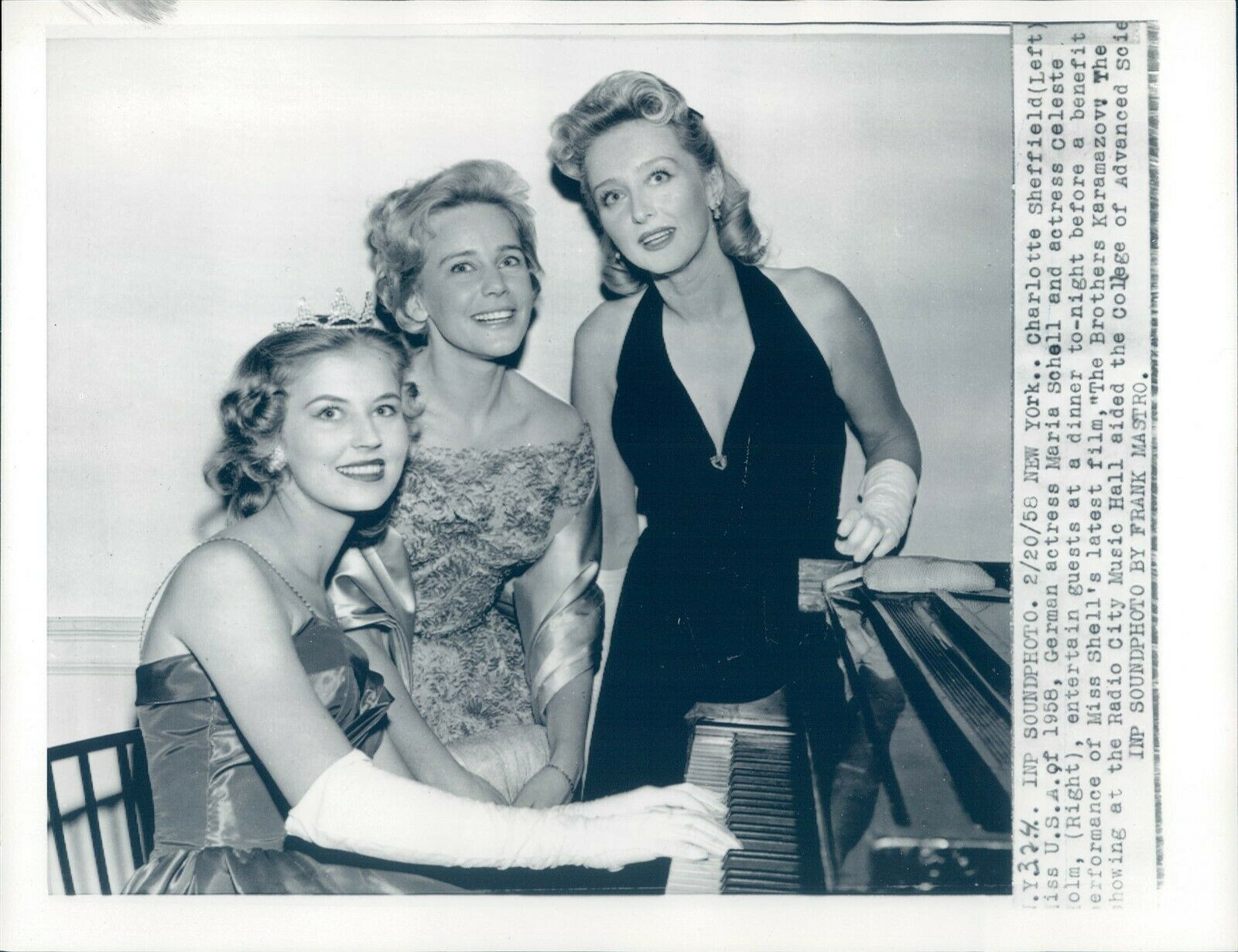
- Charlotte Sheffield, Maria Schell and Celeste Holm entertain guests at a dinner to-night, 1958
- Born: September 1, 1936
- Died: April 15, 2016 (aged 79)
- Occupations: Beauty pageant winner; actress
- Years active: 1957–2011
- Title: Miss USA 1957
- Spouse: Richard Maxfield
- Children: 8

Charlotte Sheffield (September 1, 1936 – April 15, 2016) was an American beauty pageant titleholder who was crowned Miss USA 1957.

After winning the Miss Utah USA crown, Sheffield, from Salt Lake City, Utah, was first runner-up in the Miss USA competition. A day later, the original winner, Mary Leona Gage, was stripped of her title when it emerged that she was not only too young to compete (18 years old; the age limit was 21), but was also married with two sons. Sheffield ascended as Miss USA, but was not allowed to compete for the Miss Universe 1957 crown. By the time Gage's deceit was discovered, Sheffield had already missed the preliminary competition. Sheffield went on to compete at the 1957 Miss World pageant, but failed to place.

Charlotte then married Richard Maxfield and had 8 children, four boys and four girls. She was a member of the Mormon Tabernacle Choir for ten years and acted in many plays and movies. She was a special guest at the Miss USA pageant several times through the years. She was most recently seen as a special guest in Las Vegas at the 2011 Miss USA pageant.

In 1958, Sheffield starred alongside Bret Morrison in a science fiction radio drama The Adventure of the Beauty Queen, as a part of the Exploring Tomorrow radio series. Her last film was Stand Strong, released in 2011. The trailer is featured on YouTube under that title. She is seen in the trailer several times.

Charlotte died in 2016 in Salt Lake City due to Legionnaires' disease.
