= Bailey Anne Kennedy =

Cambodian-American beauty pageant winner

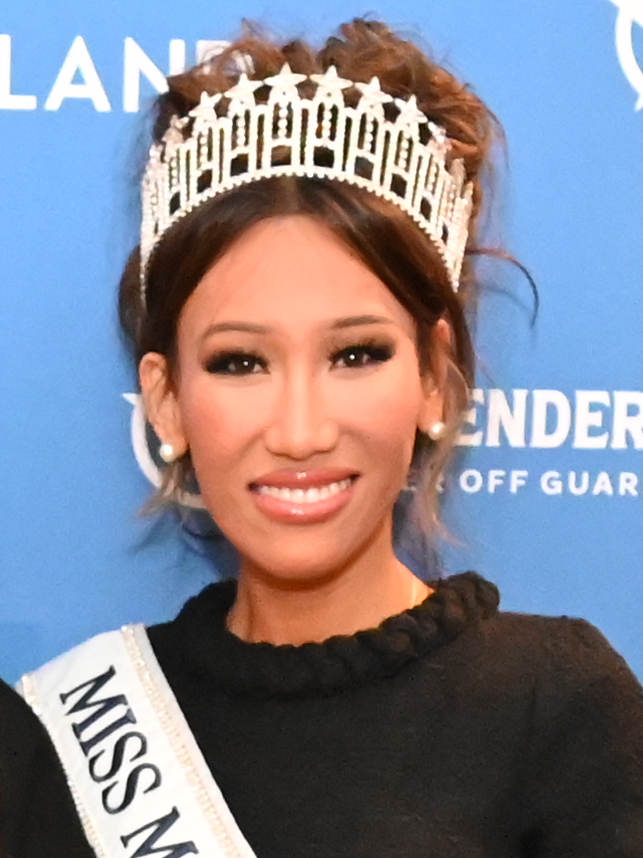
- Kennedy in 2024
- Born: Cambodia
- Spouse: Casey Guthrie
- Beauty pageant titleholder
- Title: Miss Maryland USA 2024
- Hair color: Black
- Eye color: Brown
- Major competitions: Miss Maryland USA 2024 (Winner); Miss USA 2024 (Unplaced)

Bailey Anne Kennedy is a Cambodian-American model and beauty pageant titleholder who was crowned Miss Maryland USA 2024, becoming the first openly transgender woman and first Asian American to win the beauty pageant. She represented Maryland at Miss USA 2024.

== Early life ==
Kennedy was born in Cambodia and emigrated to the United States when she was eleven.

== Career ==
In 2024, Bailey Anne entered her first pageant and won the title of Miss Maryland USA. She became the first openly transgender woman, and the first Asian American woman, the first immigrant, the first military spouse, and the first woman over the traditional age of 28 to win Miss Maryland USA when she was crowned in June 2024. She serves the United Service Organizations as a center representative. She represented Maryland on August 4, 2024, at the Miss USA 2024 pageant in Los Angeles as the oldest and second openly transgender delegate, following Kataluna Enriquez of Nevada.

== Personal life ==
Bailey Anne is married to Casey Guthrie, an officer of the United States Marine Corps.

Awards and achievements
Preceded by Savena Mushinge	Miss Maryland USA; 2024	Succeeded by Lexia Gillette
