= Jessi Kalambayi =

Congolese and American beauty pageant titleholder

- Born: Jessi Longwe Kalambayi; Kinshasa, Democratic Republic of the Congo
- Education: Metropolitan State University of Denver; University of Denver
- Beauty pageant titleholder
- Title: Miss Colorado USA 2024; Miss Universe Democratic Republic of the Congo 2026
- Major competitions: Miss USA 2024; (Top 10); Miss Universe Democratic Republic of the Congo 2026; (Winner); Miss Universe 2026; (TBD)

Jessi Kalambayi is a Congolese and American beauty pageant titleholder who will represent the Democratic Republic of the Congo at Miss Universe 2026.

== Early life and education ==
Jessi Kalambayi was born in Kinshasa and grew up in Durban, South Africa, before moving to the United States at the age of 18.

Kalambayi earned a bachelor's degree in Psychology from Metropolitan State University of Denver and a master's degree in International Studies, specializing in Migration, from the University of Denver.

== Pageantry ==
Kalambayi won Miss Colorado USA 2024 and went on to compete at Miss USA 2024, where she placed in the Top 10.

She won Miss Universe Democratic Republic of the Congo 2026 and will represent the Democratic Republic of the Congo at Miss Universe 2026 in San Juan, Puerto Rico.

Awards and achievements
Preceded by Dorcas Dienda Kasinde	Miss Universe Democratic Republic of the Congo; 2026	Incumbent
Preceded by Arianna Lemus	Miss Colorado USA; 2024	Succeeded by Sydney Hella
