= Alma Cooper =

U.S. Army officer and Miss USA 2024

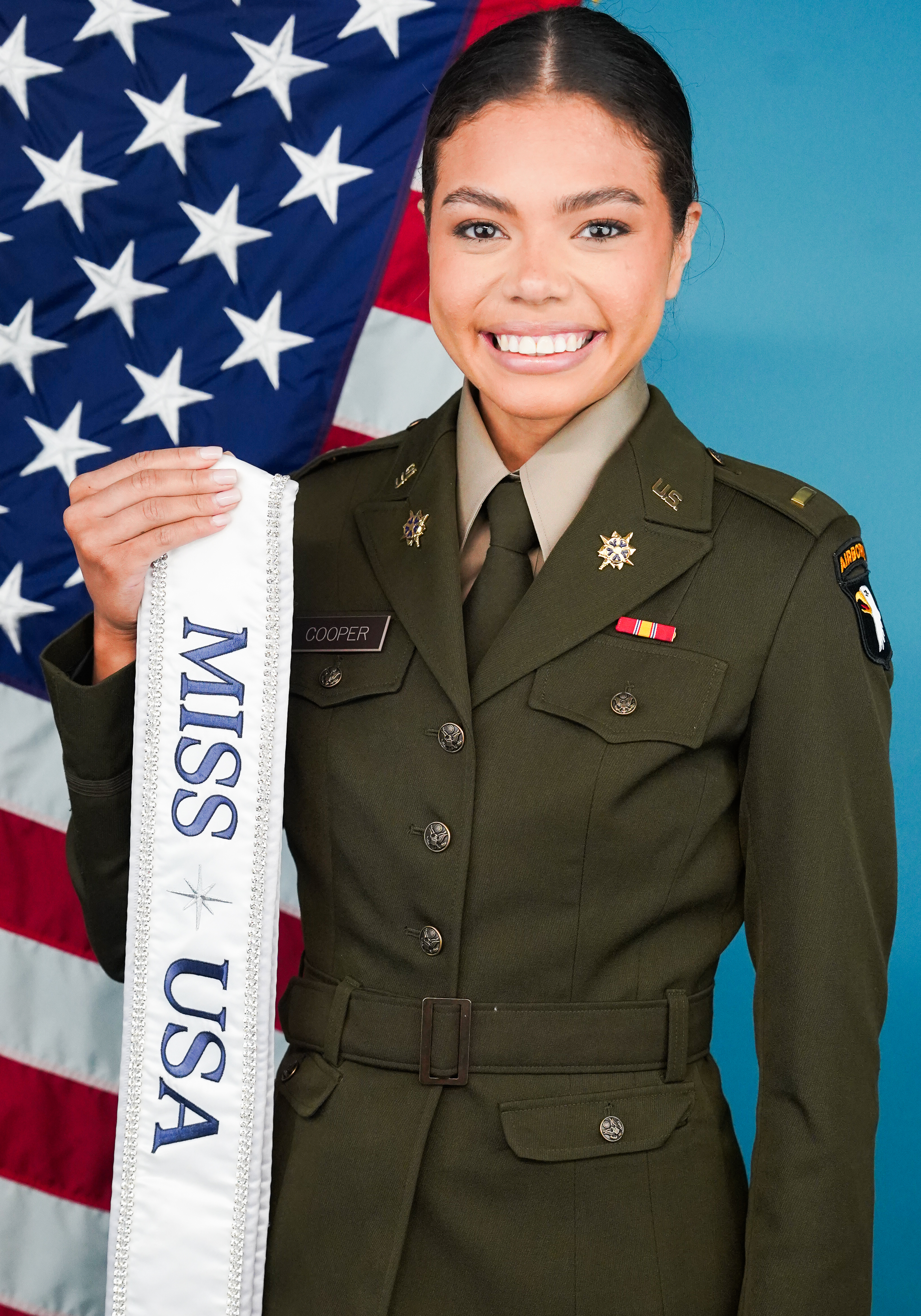
- Cooper in 2024
- Born: Alma Oralia Minerva Cooper; March 17, 2002 (age 24); Okemos, Michigan, U.S.
- Education: United States Military Academy (BS); Stanford University
- Height: 1.75 m (5 ft 9 in)
- Beauty pageant titleholder
- Title: Miss Michigan USA 2024; Miss USA 2024
- Major competitions: Miss Michigan USA 2024; (Winner); Miss USA 2024; (Winner); (Best in Interview); Miss Universe 2024; (Unplaced)
- Military career
- Allegiance: United States
- Branch: United States Army
- Service years: Since 2023
- Rank: First lieutenant

Alma Oralia Minerva Cooper (born March 17, 2002) is an American beauty pageant titleholder who was crowned Miss USA 2024. Cooper represented the United States at the Miss Universe 2024 pageant where she did not place. Cooper was previously crowned Miss Michigan USA 2024 and is the fourth woman from Michigan to be crowned Miss USA.

== Early life and education ==
Alma Oralia Minerva Cooper was born March 17, 2002 in Okemos, Michigan, to parents Stacey and Oralia Cooper, and describes herself as a "lifelong Michigander". Her father is African-American and a retired major in the United States Army, while her mother is a former pageant contestant and migrant worker from Mexico who came to the United States at age six. Cooper also has an elder sister who is cognitively impaired.

Having skipped the third grade, Cooper graduated one year early from Okemos High School in 2019, where she was the captain of her varsity volleyball team and also played basketball and ran track. After graduating, she moved to West Point, New York to enroll in the United States Military Academy (USMA). Cooper studied mathematical science at the USMA, and graduated in 2023. Following her graduation, Cooper was accepted as a Knight-Hennessy Scholar at Stanford University, studying for a Master of Science degree in statistics on the data science track. She was also part of the cheerleading program at Stanford. Prior to becoming Miss USA, Cooper planned to serve as a second lieutenant in the Military Intelligence Corps of the United States Army after completing her degree at Stanford.

== Pageantry ==
Prior to winning Miss Michigan USA, Cooper was first runner-up at Miss Michigan Teen USA. Following her teenage pageant career, Cooper worked as a professional model throughout the Midwestern United States. Cooper later competed in and won Miss Michigan USA 2024 as Miss Okemos in April 2024. Cooper was cited by the West Point Association of Graduates as the first active-duty officer in the United States Army to compete for the Miss Michigan USA title. As Miss Michigan USA, Cooper was qualified to represent the state at the Miss USA 2024 pageant.

Cooper entered and won Miss USA on August 4, 2024, at the Peacock Theater in Los Angeles, against 50 other contestants. As Miss USA 2024, Cooper represented the United States of America at Miss Universe 2024, but was unplaced, thus ending its 13-year streak of placements. Her national costume was based on Uncle Sam.

Awards and achievements
| Preceded by Savannah Gankiewicz (Hawaii) | Miss USA; 2024 | Succeeded by Audrey Eckert (Nebraska) |
| Preceded by Alexis Fagan-Williams | Miss Michigan USA; 2024 | Vacant Title next held by Michele Lewandoski |
