= Reprisal (2018 film) =

2018 film by Brian A. Miller

- Film poster
- Directed by: Brian A. Miller
- Written by: Bryce Hammons
- Produced by: Randall Emmett; George Furla; Mark Stewart
- Starring: Frank Grillo; Bruce Willis; Johnathon Schaech; Olivia Culpo
- Cinematography: Peter A. Holland
- Edited by: Paul Harb
- Music by: Giona Ostinelli; Sonya Belousova
- Production companies: EFO; Ingenious; Kind Hearts Entertainment
- Distributed by: Lionsgate Premiere; Grindstone Entertainment Group
- Release date: August 31, 2018
- Running time: 89 minutes
- Country: United States
- Language: English
- Box office: $598,625

Reprisal is a 2018 American action thriller film directed by Brian A. Miller and written by Bryce Hammons. The film stars Frank Grillo, Bruce Willis, Johnathon Schaech, and Olivia Culpo.

== Plot ==
Jacob, who is the son of a deceased police officer, is employed as a bank manager. He is married to Christina, and they have a daughter, Sophia, who is very ill from an extremely aggressive form of Type 1 diabetes. As a result of Sophia's mounting medical bills, they are struggling financially.

One day, a robber infiltrates Jacob's bank, and after killing a guard, forces Jacob to open the vault and give him the money. The robber then uses Jacob and another employee as a decoy so he can make his escape.

Jacob later discusses the robbery with his neighbor, James, a retired cop, and they analyze the robbery along with other heists committed by the robber. Having singled out various signature traits, Jacob identifies the robber as a person named Gabriel and concludes that his next target is an armored car. This proves to be true, and during this robbery, Gabriel kills one guard and injures another, Maribel. Jacob intervenes and rescues Maribel, who knows Jacob from the bank. She is taken to the hospital for her injuries. Jacob happens to observe where Gabriel hides the money from the armored car robbery, steals it, and hides it behind his house while Gabriel torches his hideout at his father's abandoned factory.

Gabriel soon discovers the money is missing. He knows it was taken by Jacob, so he tracks Maribel to the hospital to get to Jacob. After gunning down an investigator interviewing Maribel, and holding her at gunpoint, he forces her to call Jacob, asking him to come to the hospital. Gabriel then kills Maribel and makes his way to Jacob's house. There, he kidnaps Christina and Sophia. James and Jacob arrive to rescue them, Gabriel calls Jacob and demands Jacob leave James behind and bring him the stolen money as a ransom.

With James's help, Jacob co-ordinates the drop-off of the money and the rescue of his family. This does not go smoothly, resulting in a bloody shootout, with Gabriel killing several police officers. In the end, Gabriel is killed by James.

Six months later, Jacob has quit his job as a banker and joined the local police force. He is now a rookie cop, having decided to follow in the footsteps of his late father.

== Cast ==
- Frank Grillo as Jacob
- Bruce Willis as James
- Johnathon Schaech as Gabriel
- Olivia Culpo as Christina, Jacob's wife
- Colin Egglesfield as FBI Agent Fields
- Joy Elizabeth Corrigan as Katy
- Christopher Rob Bowen as Detective Roberts
- Jesse Pruett as Hospital Administrator
- Tyler Jon Olson as Casey
- Wass Stevens as Fredericks
- Sergio Rizzuto as Michael
- Natali Yura as Maribel
- Jason Marcus Griffith as Businessman
- William Cross as Businessman
- Brian D. Wolfe as Paramedic #1
- James Kalub as Businessman
- Natalia Sophie Butler as Sophia, Jacob and Christina's daughter

== Production ==
The project was announced on February 21, 2017, and that Emmett/Furla/Oasis Films had set Bruce Willis to star in the action thriller film, which would be directed by Brian A. Miller and produced by Randall Emmett and George Furla. On June 2, 2017, Olivia Culpo was cast in the film.

Principal photography on the film began on August 7, 2017, in Cincinnati, Ohio.

The film was shot in 14 days, of which Bruce Willis was on set for 1 day.

== Reception ==
As of December 14, 2025, Reprisal grossed $598,625 in the United Arab Emirates, Portugal, Turkey, and South Korea, and grossed $1,151,826 in home video sales. On the review aggregator website Rotten Tomatoes, 8% of 12 critics' reviews are positive, with an average rating of 1.8/10. Metacritic, which uses a weighted average, assigned the film a score of 19 out of 100, based on 9 critics, indicating "overwhelming dislike".
