= Ted Dhanik =

American executive

- Education: California State University, Hayward (B.A.)
- Occupation: Executive
- Known for: Myspace, Engage:BDR, and IconicReach

Ted Dhanik is an American business executive. At Myspace, Dhanik was a department VP and had helped launch the company when it was still in its infancy. He founded the technology company Engage:BDR, which went public in Australia in 2017.

== Education ==
Dhanik graduated from California State University, Hayward with a bachelor's degree.

== Career ==
Dhanik has worked as a director at Xoriant. Other companies Dhanik has worked at include Atesto Technologies, Beyond, Brigade, and Merrill. Before joining Myspace, Dhanik developed a lending program at NexTag and also led development at LowerMyBills before it was bought up by Experian.

From 2003 to 2008, Dhanik was the VP of strategic marketing for Myspace. He was responsible for helping to start Myspace when it was still in its infancy, and for helping to develop many of the company's marketing strategies.

In 2009, Dhanik left Myspace to found Engage:BDR alongside Kurtis Rintala and Kenneth Kwan. Dhanik recruited Myspace founder Tom Anderson to serve on the board of Engage:BDR in 2017. Dhanik also developed IconicReach in 2009, which is a similar platform that focuses on matching popular Instagram users with companies.

== Publications ==
Dhanik has written articles for Ad Age, Fast Company, and others.

== Personal life ==
In 2017, Dhanik dated actress Tara Reid. In 2019, Dhanik dated contortionist, actress, and America's Got Talent contestant Marina Mazepa.

Since 2022, he has been dating model Joy Corrigan.

Dhanik has various homes, including one in the West Hollywood Hills.

In 2022, his Bugatti Veyron was featured in AutoEvolution.com website.

== See also ==
- Myspace
- Tom Anderson
