= Judi Andersen =

American actress and national pageant winner

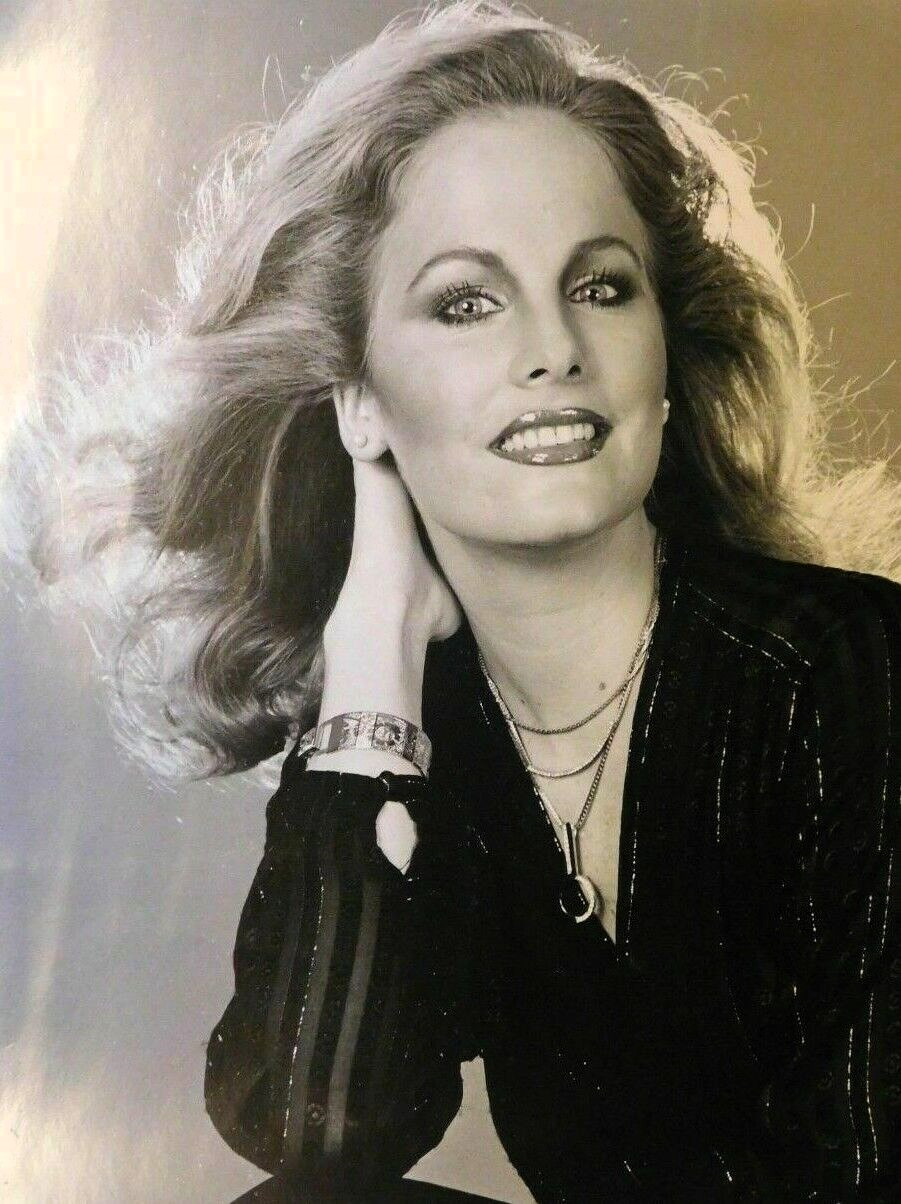
- Andersen in 1979
- Born: October 11, 1958 (age 67); Honolulu, Territory of Hawaii
- Education: Punahou School; Bennett College
- Height: 5 ft 9 in (1.75 m)
- Beauty pageant titleholder
- Title: Miss Hawaii USA 1978; Miss USA 1978
- Hair color: Blonde
- Eye color: Blue
- Major competitions: Miss USA 1978 (Winner); Miss Universe 1978 (1st Runner-Up)

Judi Andersen Harrison (née Andersen; born October 11, 1958) is an American actress, model and beauty pageant titleholder who was crowned Miss USA 1978. Andersen was born in Honolulu, and attended Punahou School before moving to Millbrook, New York to study fashion design at Bennett College.

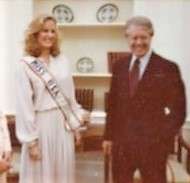
Andersen (left) at the White House with President Jimmy Carter in 1978

In 1977, Andersen was crowned Miss Hawaii USA 1978 and earned the right to represent Hawaii at Miss USA 1978 in Charleston, South Carolina. She went on to win the title, becoming the third woman from Hawaii to be crowned Miss USA. As Miss USA, Andersen represented the United States at Miss Universe 1978 in Acapulco, Mexico. Her national costume was a Vegas showgirl. Despite receiving the highest scores in interview and swimsuit, in addition to having the highest averaged semifinal score, Andersen placed as the first runner-up to Margaret Gardiner of South Africa; this was the best result for an American delegate at Miss Universe since Amanda Jones placed as the first runner-up at Miss Universe 1973.

Andersen ended her reign as Miss USA after crowning Mary Therese Friel of New York as Miss USA 1979. Afterwards, she began an acting career and appeared in television shows such as Fantasy Island, Magnum, P.I. and Jake and the Fatman, and also served as a judge at Miss USA 1980. Later in her career, Andersen returned to Hawaii and owned and operated a chiropractic clinic.
