= Joy Corrigan =

American model, actress, fashion designer and businesswoman

Joy Elizabeth Corrigan
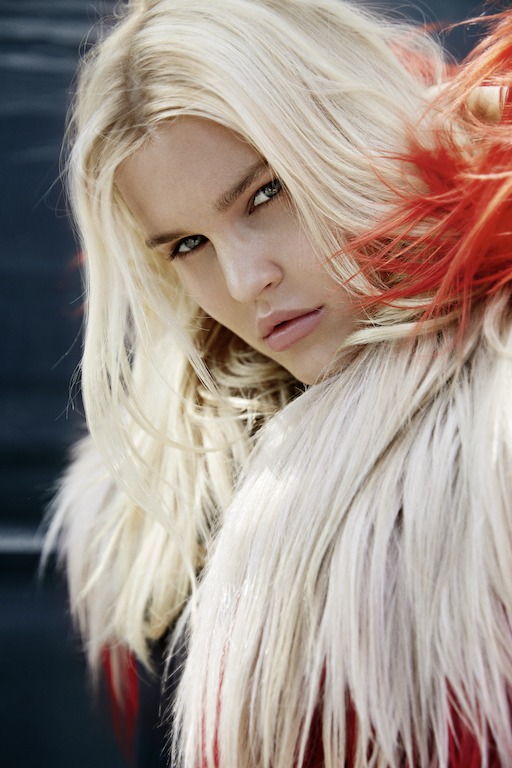
- Born: January 16, 1988 (age 38)
- Occupations: Model, actress, fashion designer and businesswoman
- Spouse: Todd Kraines (married 2026-present)
- Children: 2

Signature
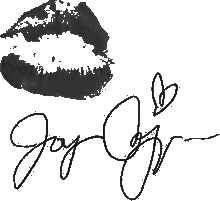

Joy Elizabeth Corrigan is an American model, actress, fashion designer and businesswoman. She is a former Sports Illustrated swimsuit model, Playboy Playmate, and Victoria’s Secret model.

Corrigan is also co-founder of the clothing company Naked Species. As an actress, she has appeared in films such as Aftermath and Reprisal.

== Career ==
Corrigan booked her first fashion show after being scouted at a mall at the age of 14. She went on to sign with the New York branch of Marilyn Agency. Corrigan appeared in fashion shoots for clothing brands such as Guess and Victoria’s Secret and cosmetic brands such as Urban Decay and Ella Baché. She has also modeled for designer brands such as Roberto Cavalli, Vivienne Westwood, and Jimmy Choo.

Corrigan has also appeared in fashion shows such as Miami Swim Week.

She appeared on the cover of the January/February 2015 issue of Cigar Snob. Corrigan was photographed by Rankin for Hunger magazine in 2016. She posed for Playboy and was named Playmate of the Month in February 2017. She was also photographed for the cover of May/June 2018 issue of Maxim France.

Corrigan participated in the 2015, 2016, and 2018 casting calls for the Sports Illustrated Swimsuit Issue. She was photographed for Sports Illustrated in Miami in 2017.

In 2019, Corrigan founded the clothing brand Naked Species with her sister Gina Corrigan Smith. She donates part of the profits from Naked Species products to the Wild Life Tomorrow Fund to help prevent animal extinction.

Corrigan appeared on the second cover of the September 2020 issue of NOW Magazine. Other magazines Corrigan has appeared in include GQ, Marie Claire Arabia, Resident, Talk Magazine Miami, and Galore.

As an actress, Corrigan appeared in the 2017 film Aftermath, which starred Arnold Schwarzenegger, and the 2018 film Reprisal, which starred Bruce Willis. She also appeared in the 2022 series Super Pumped.

== Personal life ==
Corrigan sued Apple, Inc. after her photos were stolen from her iCloud account shortly before and during the 2014 celebrity nude photo leak.

She has a black belt in Tang Soo Do.

In 2022, she dated business executive Ted Dhanik.

In January 2025 she met real estate mogul Todd Kraines on a dating app and they married at a ceremony at Hillcrest Country Club in Los Angeles in October 2026.

== Filmography ==
=== Film ===
Year	Title	Role	Notes	Ref.
2017	Aftermath	Shelly	Credited as Joy Elizabeth Corrigan	
2017	Beach Bunny 2018 Swim	Herself	Video	
2018	Reprisal	Katy		
2021	Fashion Models Beach Bunny Miami Swim Week Sexy Bikini Models	Herself	Video	
2022	Typecasting		Short film	
2022	Intentional Trauma		Short film	
2022	Here’s My Deal		Short film	

=== Television ===
Year	Title	Role	Notes	Ref.
2022	Super Pumped	Woman #1		
