= Miss USA 1978 =

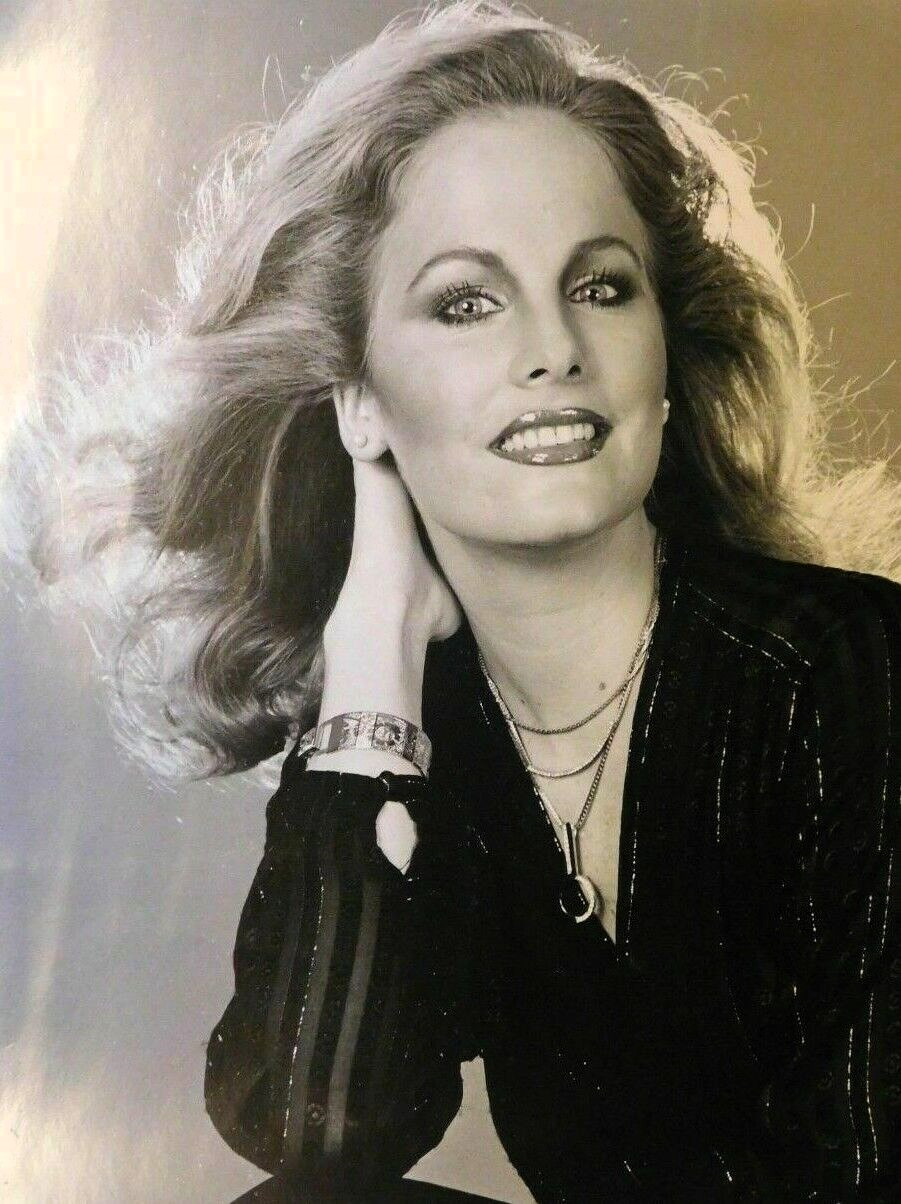
- Judi Andersen, Miss USA 1978.
- Date: April 29, 1978
- Presenters: Bob Barker; Helen O'Connell
- Entertainment: Jack Jones
- Venue: Gillard Municipal Auditorium, Charleston, South Carolina
- Broadcaster: CBS; WCSC-TV
- Entrants: 51
- Placements: 12
- Winner: Judi Andersen; Hawaii
- Congeniality: Nancy Wierzbicki; Vermont
- Best State Costume: Barbara Horan; Texas
- Photogenic: Suzanna Timberlake; Tennessee

Miss USA 1978 was the 27th Miss USA pageant, televised live by CBS from the Gillard Municipal Auditorium in Charleston, South Carolina on April 29, 1978.

The pageant was won by Judi Andersen of Hawaii, who succeeded outgoing titleholder Kimberly Tomes of Texas. Andersen was the third woman from Hawaii to win the Miss USA title, and went on to place as 1st runner-up to Margaret Gardiner of South Africa at Miss Universe 1978.

== Results ==
=== Placements ===
Final results	Contestant
Miss USA 1978	Hawaii – Judi Andersen
1st Runner-Up	Massachusetts – Diane Pollard
2nd Runner-Up	Texas – Barbara Horan
3rd Runner-Up	Indiana – Jayme Buecher
4th Runner-Up	New Mexico – Marlena Garland
Top 12	Alaska – Barbara Samuelson; California – Donna Adrian; Florida – April Shaw; Oklahoma – Nancy Lippold; Pennsylvania – Sandy Dell; Utah – Margo Flynn; Virginia – Robin Shadle

=== Special awards ===
Award	Contestant
Miss Amity (Congeniality)	Vermont – Nancy Wierzbicki
Miss Photogenic	Tennessee – Suzanna Timberlake
Best State Costume	Texas – Barbara Horan (Winner)
Best State Costume	(New York (state)) New York – Darlene Javits (2nd Place)
Best State Costume	Indiana – Jayme Buecher (3rd Place)

== Delegates ==
The Miss USA 1978 delegates were:

- Alabama – Eva Stancil
- Alaska – Barbara Samuelson
- Arizona – Jacque Crutchfield
- Arkansas – Donna Funderburk
- California - Donna Adrian
- Colorado – Linda Potestio
- Connecticut – Martha Szabo
- Delaware – Donna Lewis
- (Washington, D.C.) District of Columbia – Wanda Clineman
- Florida – April Shaw
- (Georgia (U.S. state)) Georgia – Larinda Matthews
- Hawaii – Judi Andersen
- Idaho – Suzette Sanford
- Illinois – Suzanne Piché
- Indiana – Jayme Buecher
- Iowa – Michelle Daley
- Kansas – Mary "Diddy" Bell
- Kentucky – Linda Woodruff
- Louisiana – Tauny Hanes
- Maine – Catherine Ledue
- Maryland – Rhonda Koch
- Massachusetts – Diane Pollard
- Michigan – April Patrick
- Minnesota – Janey Gohl
- Mississippi – Wanda Gatlin
- Missouri – Paula Taylor
- Montana – Susan Riplett
- Nebraska – Shari Reimers
- Nevada – Dawn Jameson
- New Hampshire – Barbara Miller
- New Jersey – Sheryl Ann Hoehn
- New Mexico – Marlena Garland
- (New York (state)) New York – Darlene Javits
- North Carolina – Kathryn Norman
- North Dakota – Theresa Olson
- Ohio – Sheila Anderson
- Oklahoma – Nancy Lippold
- Oregon – Julie Heater
- Pennsylvania – Sandy Dell
- Rhode Island – Sharon Lee McGarry
- South Carolina – Kathryn Threatt
- South Dakota – Nadene Oppold
- Tennessee – Suzanna Timberlake
- Texas – Barbara Horan
- Utah – Margo Flynn
- Vermont – Nancy Wierzbicki
- Virginia – Robin Shadle
- (Washington (state)) Washington – Barbara Bogar
- West Virginia – Deborah Davis
- Wisconsin – Cynthia Paulson
- Wyoming – Kathryn Flitner

== Judges ==
- Jennifer Balbier – magazine editor
- Joseph Barbera – co-founder of animation studio Hanna-Barbera
- Theodore Bikel – actor
- Keir Dullea – actor
- Eileen Ford – co-founder of the Ford Agency
- Dong Kingman – artist
- Alfred Allan Lewis – author
- Haven Moses – NFL football player
- LeRoy Neiman – artist
- Barbara Peterson – Miss USA 1976 from Minnesota
- Bo Svenson – actor
