= Miss USA 1957 =

6th Miss USA pageant

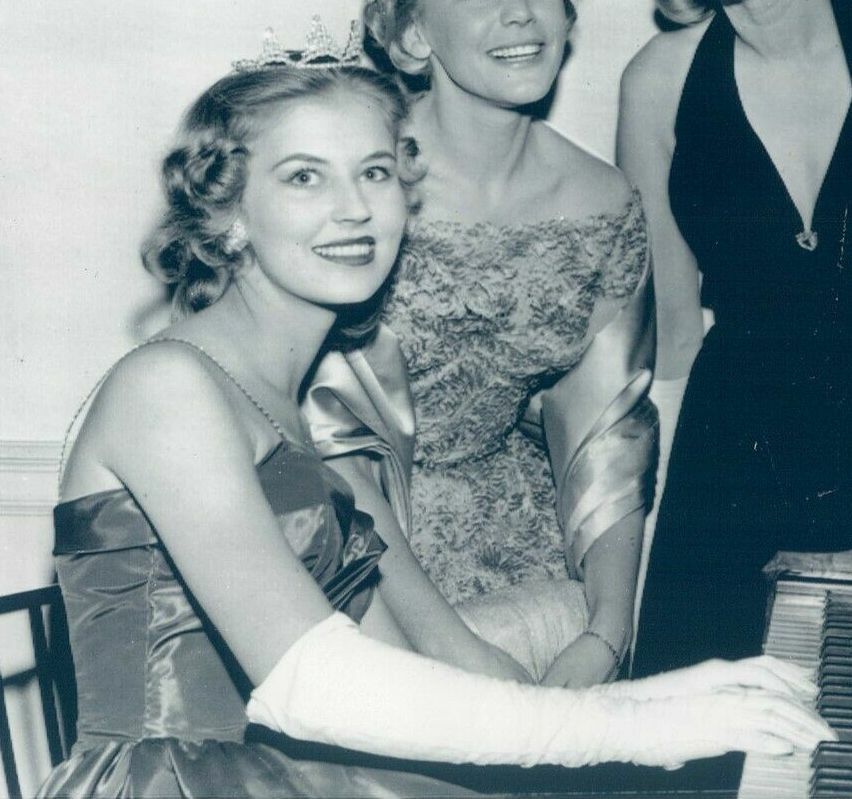
- Charlotte Sheffield, Miss USA 1957
- Date: 17 July 1957
- Presenters: Bob Russell
- Venue: Long Beach Municipal Auditorium, Long Beach, California
- Entrants: 44
- Placements: 15
- Winner: Charlotte Sheffield; Utah (Successor); Mary Leona Gage; Maryland (Dethroned)

Miss USA 1957 was the sixth Miss USA pageant, held at Long Beach Municipal Auditorium, Long Beach, California on 17 July 1957, during the run-up to the year's Miss Universe pageant.

At the end of the pageant, Mary Leona Gage of Maryland was declared the winner and was crowned by the outgoing titleholder, Miss Universe 1956 Carol Morris, of Iowa.

The following day, rumors about Gage's past and current circumstances began to circulate, and an investigation was launched by pageant organisers. It was discovered that Gage was 18 (not 21 as she had claimed), while her mother and her mother-in-law confirmed she had been married twice and was the mother of two young sons.

As all of these were violations of multiple contest eligibility rules, Gage was immediately disqualified, and the title and the associated prize package automatically passed to the 1st runner-up, Charlotte Sheffield of Utah. The other three finalists were moved one place, and the highest-scoring semi-finalist, Kathryn Gabriel of Ohio, became the 4th runner-up.

By the time the scandal broke publicly, the Miss Universe preliminary judging had already taken place, with Gage chosen as a semi-finalist, and allowed to participate pending the results of the investigation. It was too late for Sheffield to compete, and it would be the only time the United States has not been represented at the Miss Universe pageant. The 1957 Miss USA pageant is, as of 2026, the only occasion to date that the winner was stripped of her title by pageant organizers.

== Results ==
Placement	Contestant
Miss USA 1957	Maryland – Mary Leona Gage (Dethroned)
Miss USA 1957	Utah – Charlotte Sheffield (Successor)
1st runner-up	West Virginia – Ruth Parr
2nd runner-up	Nevada – Joan Adams
3rd runner-up	Nebraska – Carolyn McGirr
4th runner-Up	Ohio – Kathryn Gabriel
Top 15	Arkansas – Helen Garrott; California – Peggy Jacobson; Illinois – Marianne Gaba; Iowa – Judith Hall; Massachusetts – Sandra Ramsey; (New York (state)) New York – Sanita Pelkey; South Carolina – Jean Spotts; Texas – Gloria Hunt; (Washington (state)) Washington – Diana Schafer

== Contestants ==
44 contestants competed for the title.

State/City	Contestant	Age (Note: Ages at the time of the pageant)	Hometown	Notes
Arkansas	Helen Garrott	19	West Memphis	
California	Peggy Jacobson	18	Downey	
Colorado	Mary Linda Clapham	20	Glenwood Springs	
Connecticut	Rosemary Galliotti	21	West Hartford	
Delaware	Patricia Ellingsworth	18	Millsboro	
Florida	Deanie Cates	18	Holly Hill	
Georgia	Ruth Lycan	19	Atlanta	
Illinois	Marianne Gaba	18	Chicago	Later Playboy playmate in September 1959
Indiana	Pat Dorsett	23	Indianapolis	
Iowa	Judith Ann Hall	20	Council Bluffs	
Louisiana	Earlyn Regouffre	19	New Orleans	
Maine	Roberta Aymie	23	Jackman	
Maryland	Mary Leona Gage	21	Glen Burnie	Initially a semi-finalist at Miss Universe but was disqualified
Massachusetts	Sandra Ramsey	19	Haverhill	
Miami Beach, Florida	Faye Ray	18	Miami	
Michigan	Sharon Moore	19	Detroit	
Minnesota	Mary Ford	18	Minneapolis	
Missouri	Judith Murback	18	Sikeston	
Nebraska	Carolyn McGirr	18	Sidney	
Nevada	Joan Adams	23	Las Vegas	
New Hampshire	Lyla Moran	18	Hampton Beach	
New Jersey	Jeanne Lewis	22	Kearny	
New Mexico	Patricia Stafford	18	Albuquerque	
New York	Sanita Pelkey	21	Bronx	
North Carolina	Peggy Ann Dennis	19	Lilesville	
North Dakota	Anne-Marit Studness	19	Devils Lake	
Ohio	Kathryn Gabriel	20	Cleveland	
Oklahoma	Rose Mary Raab	19	Oklahoma City	
Oregon	Sonja Landsem	20	Portland	
Pennsylvania	Rosalie Culp	20	Monessen	
Philadelphia, Pennsylvania	Barbara Miller	19	Philadelphia	
Rhode Island	Myrna Altieri	18	Cranston	
South Carolina	Jean Spotts	20	Newberry County	
South Dakota	Gay Marshall	19	Sioux Falls	
St. Louis, Missouri	Carole Learn	19	Ferguson	
Tennessee	Patricia Prather	18	Alamo	
Texas	Gloria Hunt	20	Corpus Christi	
Utah	Charlotte Sheffield	20	Salt Lake City	Non-semifinalist at Miss World 1957
Vermont	Marjorie Link	24	Hardwick	
Virginia	Patricia Bush	21	Portsmouth	
Washington	Diana Schafer	18	Bellevue	
West Virginia	Ruth Parr	18	St. Albans	
Wisconsin	Natalie Lueck	20	Two Rivers	
Wyoming	Marilyn Hawkins	19	Casper	
