= Allyn Rose =

American model (born 1988)

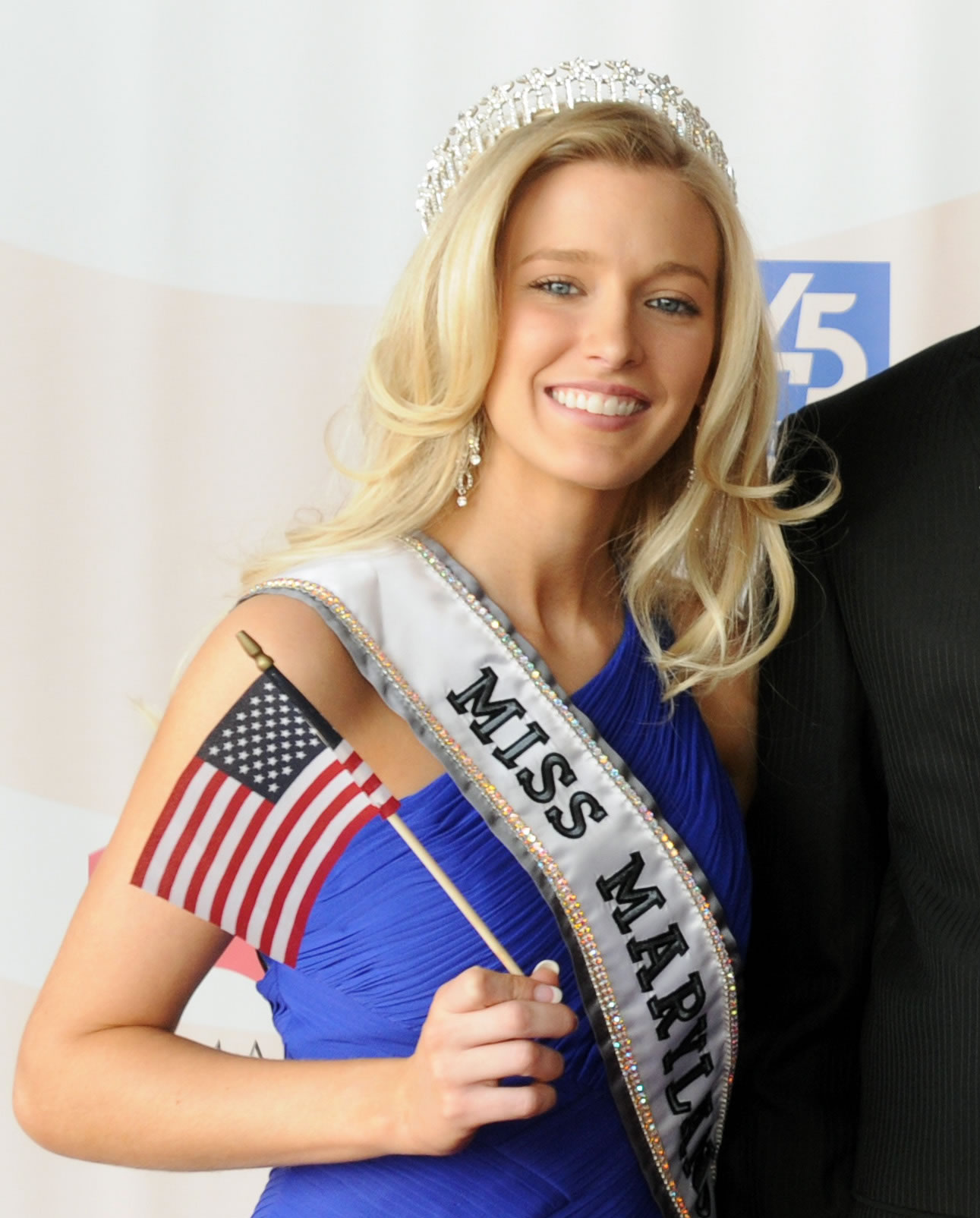
- Rose poses at the Maryland Department of Veterans Affairs in 2011
- Born: Allyn Rose; May 27, 1988 (age 38); Newburg, Maryland, U.S.
- Education: University of Maryland (B.A. Government and Politics); Mannheim University (Master of Comparative Business Law)
- Beauty pageant titleholder
- Title: Miss Sinergy 2010; Miss Maryland USA 2011; Miss District of Columbia 2012; Miss United States Supranational 2014
- Major competitions: Miss USA 2011 (Top 8); Miss America 2013 (Unplaced); Miss Supranational 2014 (3rd Runner-Up)
- Website: http://www.allynrose.com/

Allyn Rose (born May 27, 1988) is an American beauty pageant titleholder, professional speaker, and breast cancer advocate from Newburg, Maryland.

Rose won the title of Miss Maryland USA 2011 title and represented Maryland in the Miss USA 2011 pageant in June 2011, placing in the top 8. The following year she won the Miss District of Columbia title and competed in the Miss America 2013 pageant where she was unplaced.

After losing her mother to breast cancer at the age of 16, Rose partnered with the Susan G. Komen Breast Cancer Foundation and the Tigerlilly Foundation, educating women in cancer prevention. In the fall of 2012, Rose revealed her decision to undergo a prophylactic double mastectomy. In June 2013, she gave a TED Talk at Chapman University on the Power of Redefining Breasts. Rose continues to work as a preventive healthcare advocate and contributor on several national media outlets. The 21st Annual Congress on Women's Health awarded her the Women's Health Advocacy Award.

Rose was a competitive roller figure skater and won her first USA Roller Sports (USARS) championship at the age of 12. She attended La Plata High School in La Plata, Maryland. Rose went on to play volleyball for the College of Southern Maryland and later at the University of Maryland, College Park, where she graduated with a B.A. in Government & Politics. In 2017, Rose completed her M.A. in International Business Law at the University of Mannheim.

Preceded by Simone Feldman	Miss Maryland USA; 2011	Succeeded by Nana Meriwether
Preceded by Ashley Boalch	(Washington, D.C.) Miss District of Columbia; 2012	Succeeded by Bindhu Pamarthi
Preceded by (Indonesia) Cok Istri Krisnanda Widani	Miss Supranational 3rd Runner-Up; 2014	Succeeded by (Iceland) Tanja Ýr Ástþórsdóttir
