= Miss USA 2024 =

73rd edition of the Miss USA competition

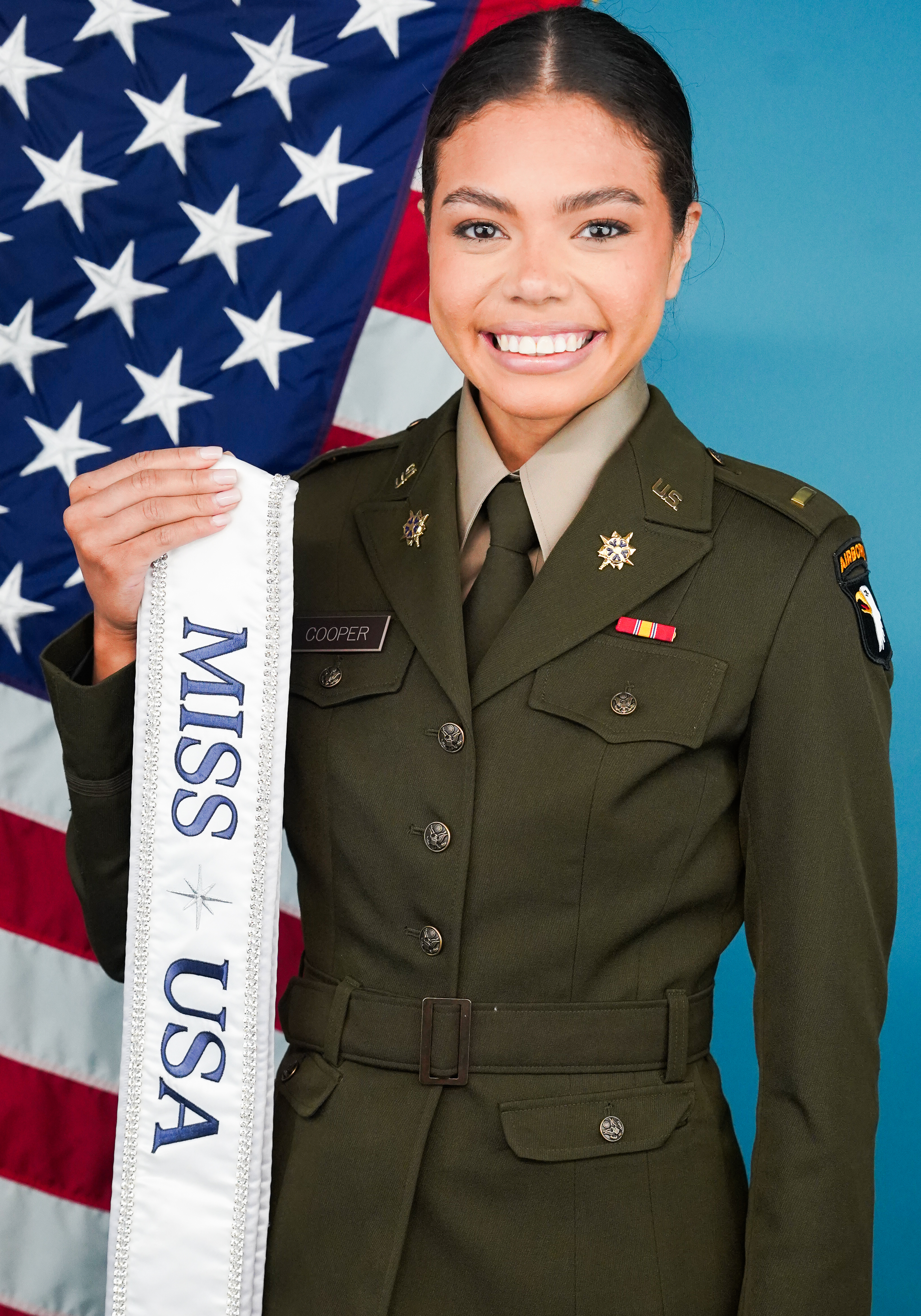
- Alma Cooper
- Date: August 4, 2024
- Presenters: Garcelle Beauvais; Keltie Knight; Morgan Romano; Patrick Starrr
- Venue: Peacock Theater, Los Angeles, California
- Broadcaster: The CW
- Entrants: 51
- Placements: 20
- Winner: Alma Cooper; Michigan
- Congeniality: Madeline Bohlman; Arkansas
- Photogenic: Melissa Sapini; Massachusetts

Miss USA 2024 was the 73rd Miss USA pageant, held at the Peacock Theater in Los Angeles, California on August 4, 2024.

Savannah Gankiewicz of Hawaii crowned Alma Cooper of Michigan as her successor at the end of the event. She represented the United States at Miss Universe 2024 in Mexico.

== Background ==
=== Location ===
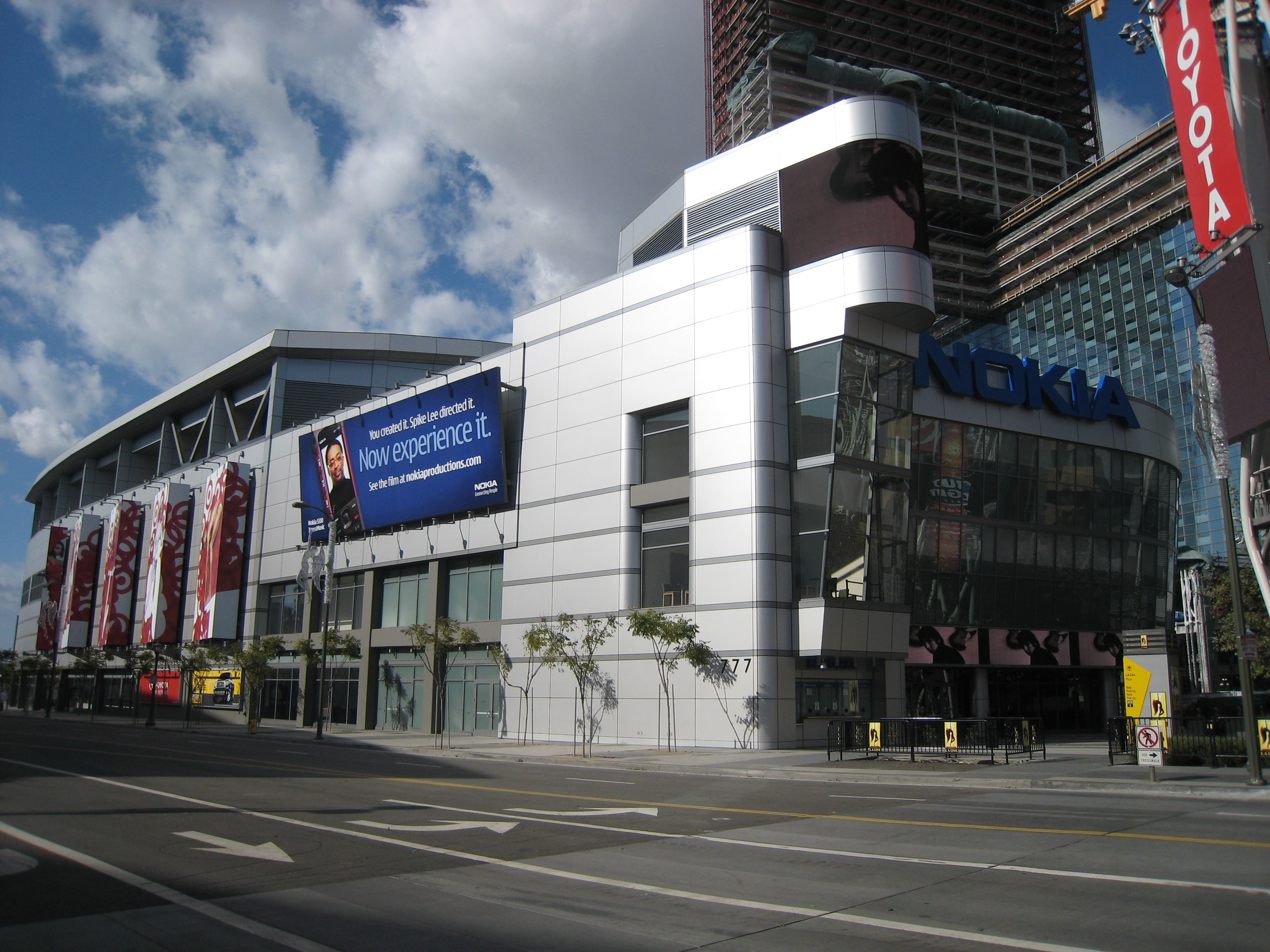
Peacock Theater in Los Angeles, California, the host venue of the Miss USA 2024 competition

On July 14, 2022, it was reported that the competition would be held in Reno, Nevada, with the city securing a three-year deal to host the pageant from 2022 to 2024 under the ownership of then-national director and Miss USA 2008 Crystle Stewart. The event was originally to take place at Grand Sierra Resort in Reno; this would be the fourth time that the pageant is held in Reno and the third consecutive year holding the pageant in the city following Miss USA 2019, 2022 and 2023.

On June 29, 2024, it was announced that Miss USA 2024 would take place at the Peacock Theater in Los Angeles, California, scheduled to be held on August 4, 2024. This will be the first time since 2007 returning to its original home in California.

=== Selection of contestants ===
Starting with this edition of the pageant, the Miss Universe Organization announced that it would allow women who are 28 years old and over to participate. Previous editions had only above 18 and below 28 years of age.

Selection of delegates at state pageants was supposed to begin in August 2023; however, after the appointment of president and CEO Laylah Rose, the state pageants were postponed indefinitely. The state pageants were then rescheduled in March 2024. The first state pageant was Tennessee, held on March 9, 2024, and the last state pageant was Florida, held on July 7, 2024. The state pageant season in previous years was much longer, around five to seven months.

== Results ==
=== Placements ===
Placement	Contestant
Miss USA 2024	Michigan – Alma Cooper
1st runner-up	Kentucky – Connor Perry
2nd runner-up	Oklahoma – Danika Christopherson
3rd runner-up	Tennessee – Christell Foote
4th runner-up	Ohio – Macy Hudson
Top 10	Colorado – Jessi Kalambayi; Hawaii – Breea Yamat; Massachusetts – Melissa Sapini; Texas – Aarieanna Ware; Virginia – Himanvi Panidepu
Top 20	California – Samantha Ramos; District of Columbia – Kleo Torres; Illinois – Grace Rodi; Iowa – McKenzie Ariana Kerry §; Kansas – Bella Whitlock; Mississippi – Kaylee Brooke McCollum; Nevada – Najah Ali; New York – Marizza Delgado; North Carolina – Kenzie Hansley; South Carolina – Gracen Grainger

§ – Voted into Top 20 by viewers.

=== Special awards ===
Award	Contestant
Best in Swimsuit	Kentucky - Connor Perry
Best in Evening Gown	Tennessee - Christell Foote
Best in Interview	Michigan - Alma Cooper
Best Impact (Social Media)	Virginia - Himanvi Panidepu
Miss Photogenic	Massachusetts - Melissa Sapini
Miss Congeniality	Arkansas - Madeline Bohlman
People's Choice	Iowa - McKenzie Ariana Kerry

== Pageant ==
=== Format ===
Same with the previous edition, the results of the preliminary competition — which consisted of the swimsuit competition, the evening gown competition, and the closed-door interview determined the first nineteen semi-finalists who advanced at the first cut. The internet voting was also used, with fans being able to vote for another delegate to advance into the semifinals. The twenty semi-finalists competed in the swimsuit competition and were narrowed down to ten afterwards. The ten semi-finalists competed in the evening gown competition and were narrowed down to five afterwards. The five finalists competed in the final question round, after which Miss USA 2024 and her runners-up were announced.

=== Selection committee ===
- Scheana Shay – Television personality (only as final telecast judge)
- Anastasia Soare – CEO of Anastasia Beverly Hills
- Gavin DeGraw – Singer (only as final telecast judge)
- Carole Gist – Miss USA 1990 from Michigan
- Natasha Graziano – Motivational speaker
- NJ Falk – Managing partner of Athletic Propulsion Labs
- Lu Parker – Miss USA 1994 from South Carolina
- Jojo Bragais – Shoe designer

== Contestants ==
Fifty-one contestants competed for the title.

State/District	Contestant	Age (Note: Ages at the time of the pageant)	Hometown	Notes
Alabama	Diane Westhoven	21	Vestavia	
Alaska	Brenna Schaake	29	Fairbanks	
Arizona	Kristina Johnson	41	Phoenix	
Arkansas	Madeline Bohlman	22	Fayetteville	Previously Miss Arkansas Teen USA 2021; First cousin of Miss America 2024 Madison Marsh
California	Samantha Ramos	24	Santa Monica	
Colorado	Jessi Kalambayi	26	Denver	
Connecticut	Shavana Clarke	29	Bridgeport	
Delaware	Alysa Bainbridge	25	Newark	Previously Miss Pennsylvania 2022; Previously Miss Pennsylvania's Outstanding Teen 2016
District of Columbia	Kleo Torres	26	Washington, D.C.	
Florida	Peyton Lewis	26	Orlando	
Georgia	Emmaline Farmer	24	Winder	
Hawaii	Breea Yamat	27	Lahaina	Sister of Miss Hawaii USA 2022 Kiana Yamat
Idaho	Kaitlyn Widmyer	28	Coeur d'Alene	
Illinois	Grace Rodi	23	Hinsdale	
Indiana	Stephanie Sullivan	33	Elkhart	
Iowa	McKenzie Ariana Kerry	26	Des Moines	
Kansas	Bella Whitlock	19	Leavenworth	
Kentucky	Connor Perry	23	Lexington	
Louisiana	Sydney Taylor	23	Livingston	Previously Miss Louisiana Teen USA 2020 (4th runner-up at Miss Teen USA 2020)
Maine	Anne Baldridge	25	Portland	
Maryland	Bailey Anne Kennedy	31	Williamsport	First transgender woman to win Miss Maryland USA
Massachusetts	Melissa Sapini	21	North Attleboro	
Michigan	Alma Cooper	22	Okemos	
Minnesota	Muna Ali	27	Saint Paul	
Mississippi	Kaylee Brooke McCollum	23	Amory	Previously Miss Mississippi Teen USA 2019 (3rd runner-up at Miss Teen USA 2019)
Missouri	Ashleigh Bedwell	25	Campbell	
Montana	Shelby Dangerfield	30	Billings	
Nebraska	Kamryn Buchanan	24	Lincoln	
Nevada	Najah Ali	23	Las Vegas	
New Hampshire	Ariel Sullivan	28	Portsmouth	
New Jersey	Jabili Kandula	24	Hoboken	
New Mexico	Mackenzie Sydow	22	Albuquerque	
New York	Marizza Delgado	25	Brooklyn	Previously Miss Earth New York 2022 (Top 20 at Miss Earth USA 2022)
North Carolina	McKenzie Hansley	24	Charlotte	Previously Miss North Carolina Teen USA 2017
North Dakota	Codi Miller	31	Amidon	Previously Miss North Dakota Teen USA 2009
Ohio	Macy Hudson	24	Dayton	
Oklahoma	Danika Christopherson	22	Lawton	Previously Miss Oklahoma Teen USA 2020 (Top 16 at Miss Teen USA 2020)
Oregon	Shayla Montgomery	21	Happy Valley	Previously Miss Oregon Teen USA 2020 (1st runner-up at Miss Teen USA 2020)
Pennsylvania	Noni Diarra	23	Philadelphia	
Rhode Island	Kaitlynne Santana	22	Woonsocket	
South Carolina	Gracen Grainger	22	Hamer	Previously Miss South Carolina Teen USA 2020 (Top 16 at Miss Teen USA 2020)
South Dakota	Ahmitara Alwal	25	Sioux Falls	
Tennessee	Christell Foote	24	Rocky Top	
Texas	Aarieanna Ware	26	Dallas	
Utah	Alyssa Chandler	21	American Fork	
Vermont	Samantha Vocatura	27	Stowe	Previously Miss World America Vermont 2023 (Top 10 at Miss World America 2023
Virginia	Himanvi Panidepu	23	Centreville	Previously Miss Virginia Teen USA 2018
Washington	Tiffany Rea	27	Clarkston	Previously Miss United States 2020
West Virginia	Caylie Simmons	24	Franklin	
Wisconsin	Tori Trittin	22	Madison	Previously Miss Minnesota Teen USA 2017
Wyoming	Mackenzie Rush	19	Sheridan	
