= Olivia Culpo =

American model (born 1992)

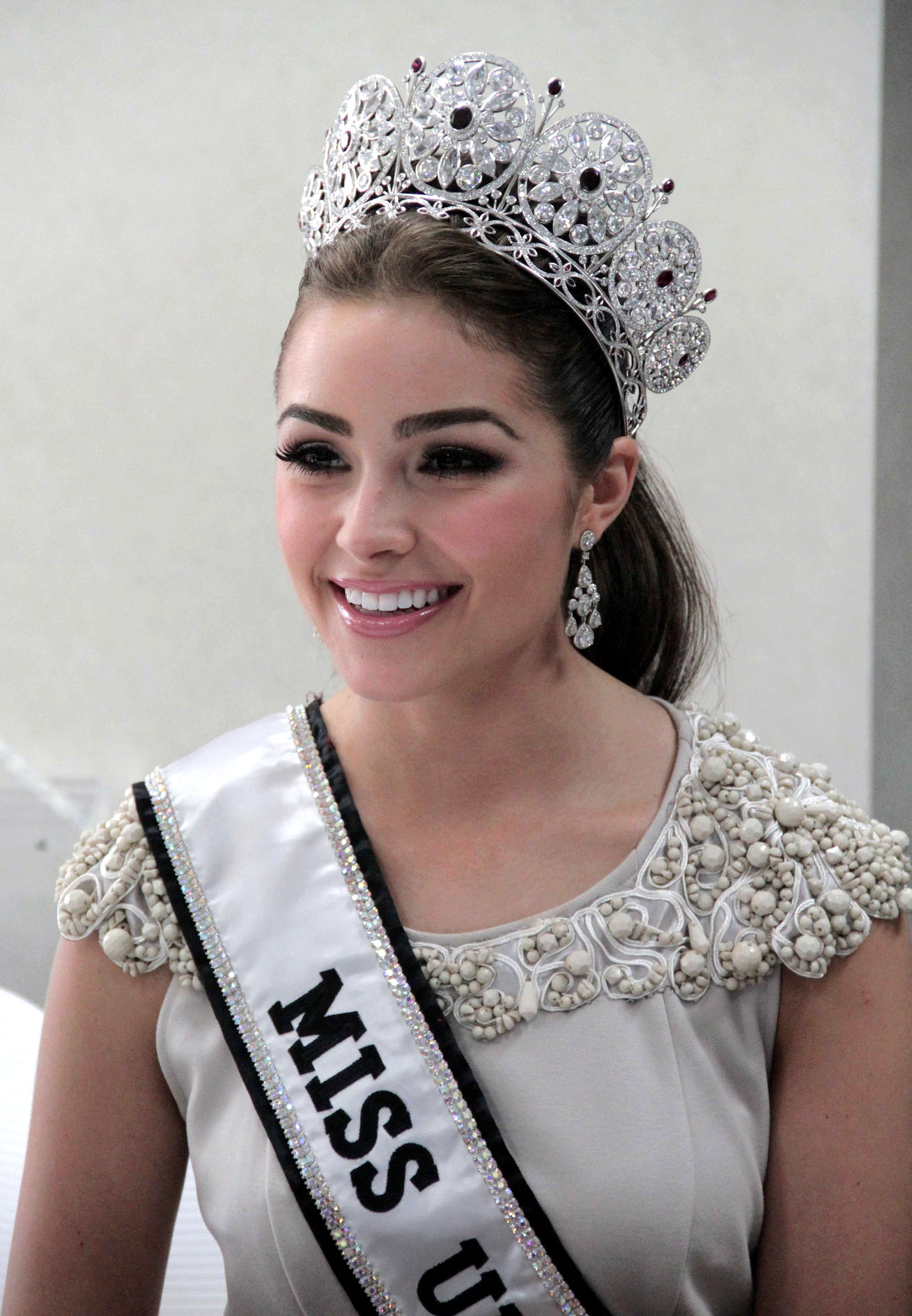
- Culpo in 2013
- Born: Olivia Frances Culpo; May 8, 1992 (age 34); Cranston, Rhode Island, U.S.
- Occupations: Model; actress; media personality
- Spouse: Christian McCaffrey (m. 2024)
- Children: 2
- Beauty pageant titleholder
- Title: Miss Rhode Island USA 2012; Miss USA 2012; Miss Universe 2012
- Years active: 2012–present
- Major competitions: Miss Rhode Island USA 2012; (Winner); Miss USA 2012; (Winner); Miss Universe 2012; (Winner)
- Website: oliviaculpo.com

Olivia Frances Culpo (born May 8, 1992) is an American model, actress, and media personality. Culpo has won Miss Rhode Island USA, Miss USA 2012, and Miss Universe 2012.

== Early life and education ==
Olivia Frances Culpo was born on May 8, 1992, in Cranston, Rhode Island, to Susan and Peter Culpo. She is the third-eldest of five siblings. She grew up in Cranston's Edgewood neighborhood and is of Italian descent with some Irish ancestry on her mother's side.

Culpo graduated from St. Mary Academy – Bay View and attended Boston University, but did not graduate. She began studying the cello in second grade and played in the Rhode Island Philharmonic Youth Orchestra, the Rhode Island Philharmonic Chamber Ensemble, the Bay View Orchestra, and the Rhode Island All-State Orchestra. She attended the Brevard Music Center, in Brevard, North Carolina, for two summers, and has performed with the Boston Accompanietta.

== Career ==
=== Pageantry ===
After winning the 2012 Miss Rhode Island USA competition, the first pageant she entered, she went on to win the Miss USA pageant on June 3, 2012.

On July 6, 2012, the city of Cranston held a homecoming celebration for Culpo for her pageant win. At an outdoor ceremony at Cranston City Hall, Mayor Allan Fung presented Culpo with the key to the city.

Culpo represented the United States and won Miss Universe 2012, held on December 19, 2012, in Las Vegas, Nevada. Her national costume was the Statue of Liberty. She is the eighth representative from the U.S. to win the title—the first in the 21st century—and the first since Brook Lee, who won Miss Universe 1997. Culpo became the first Rhode Islander to win the title. She succeeded outgoing titleholder Leila Lopes from Angola.

In January 2013, Culpo visited Indonesia for three weeks and helped crown the winner of Puteri Indonesia 2013 on February 1 in Jakarta. She also visited Yogyakarta, Surabaya, and Bali. In Jakarta, Culpo hosted a discussion with young Indonesians for the United Nations Population Fund on HIV and youth prevention at the U.S. Embassy's cultural center of America.

On August 25, 2013, Cranston's city council approved a resolution adding Culpo's name to Albert Avenue, which runs between Broad Street and Narragansett Boulevard in Edgewood.

On September 10, 2013, Culpo participated in the Sherri Hill fashion show held at Trump Tower in New York City.

On November 9, 2013, she crowned Gabriela Isler of Venezuela as her successor. In doing so, she became the third Miss Universe from the U.S. to pass the title to Venezuela, after Shawn Weatherly in 1981 and Chelsi Smith in 1996.

In May 2021, January 2023, November 2023, and November 2024, Culpo co-hosted the Miss Universe 2020, Miss Universe 2022, Miss Universe 2023, and Miss Universe 2024 pageants, respectively.

=== Outside pageantry ===
Culpo became a social media personality after gaining a significant following on Twitter, Instagram, and YouTube. She partnered and collaborated with several beauty and fashion brands, including L'Oréal, Kipling, and Uberliss, as an influencer. Culpo was featured in the Sports Illustrated Swimsuit Issue, appearing on the cover of the 2020 issue alongside Jasmine Sanders and Kate Bock. In 2018 she appeared on the reality television show Model Squad. Culpo had roles in the films The Other Woman, I Feel Pretty, Reprisal, and Venus as a Boy.

In August 2017, Culpo opened a restaurant with her family in Rhode Island.

In 2023, Culpo competed in season nine of The Masked Singer as "UFO", and was eliminated in the quarterfinals.

In 2025, Culpo hosted season one of Next Gen Chef on Netflix.

== Personal life ==
Culpo dated singer Nick Jonas from 2013 to 2015. She has been in a relationship with NFL running back Christian McCaffrey since 2019. They announced their engagement on April 7, 2023, and married on June 29, 2024, in Watch Hill, Rhode Island. On March 10, 2025, Culpo announced she was expecting her first child with McCaffrey. On July 13, 2025, she welcomed a girl named Colette Annalise McCaffrey. On May 8, 2026, Culpo announced that she is expecting their second child. Their son, Roman Augustus McCaffrey, was born on September 29, 2026, and his birth was announced in a joint Instagram post by his parents.

== Filmography ==
=== Film ===
Year	Title	Role	Notes
2014	The Other Woman	Raven-Haired Beauty	Cameo
2017	American Satan	Gretchen	
2018	I Feel Pretty	Hope	
2018	Reprisal	Christina	
2020	The Swing of Things	Laura Jane	
2021	Venus as a Boy	Ruby	
2023	Clawfoot	Tasha	

=== Television ===
Year	Title	Role	Notes
2015	Miss Universe 2015	Herself	Judge
2017; 2023	Hell's Kitchen	Herself	2 episodes
2018	Model Squad	Herself	Herself
2019	Miss Universe 2019	Herself	Backstage correspondent
2021	Paradise City	Gretchen	8 episodes
2021	Miss Universe 2020	Herself	Host
2022	The Culpo Sisters	Herself	Host
2023	Miss Universe 2022	Herself	Host
2023	The Masked Singer	Herself / UFO	Contestant on season 9; 3 episodes
2023	Miss Universe 2023	Herself	Host
2024	Miss Universe 2024	Herself	Host
2025	Next Gen Chef	Herself	Host

=== Music videos ===
Year	Title	Artist	Role
2014	"Jealous"	Nick Jonas	Herself
2014	"Amor"	Emin Agalarov	Herself

Awards and achievements
Preceded by (Angola) Leila Lopes	Miss Universe; 2012	Succeeded by (Venezuela) Gabriela Isler
Preceded by Alyssa Campanella (California)	Miss USA; 2012	Succeeded by Nana Meriwether (Maryland)
Preceded by Kate McCaughey	Miss Rhode Island USA; 2012	Succeeded by Brittany Stenovitch
Preceded by Shaelyn McNally	Miss Rhode Island Teen USA; 2007	Succeeded by Tiondra Martinez
