= List of Exploring Tomorrow episodes =

List of episodes for the Exploring Tomorrow radio show.

You can listen to many of them on the Internet Archive collection Exploring Tomorrow.

== 1957 ==
Title	Alternate	Air Date	Author	Listen
1. "The Convict"		12/11/57		RealMedia, mp3
2. "Country Boy"		12/18/57	Robert Silverberg	mp3
3. "Noggo"	"Desert Object/Alien"	12/25/57	Gordon R. Dickson	mp3

== 1958 ==
Title	Alternate	Air Date	Author	Listen
4. "Dreams"		01/01/58		Realmedia
5. "The Escape"		01/08/58	John W. Campbell	
6. "First Contact"		01/15/58	Murray Leinster	mp3
7. "The Moon is New"	"First Men on the Moon"	01/22/58	Robert Silverberg	Realmedia, mp3
8. "The Decision"	"Flashback"	01/29/58	Gordon R. Dickson	mp3
9. "The Happiness Effect"	"The Gift"	02/05/58		mp3
10. "Then Look Behind You"	"How Big is A Man/Ethan"	02/12/58	Gordon R. Dickson	
11. "The Last Doctor"		02/19/58		mp3
12. "Liar"		02/26/58	Isaac Asimov	mp3, Realmedia
13. "Look Out! Duck!"		03/05/58	David Gordon (Randall Garrett)	
14. "Made In Avak"	"Fair Fight"	03/12/58	Philip K. Dick	mp3
15. "The Mimic"		03/19/58	Robert Silverberg	RealMedia, mp3
16. "The Mutants"		03/26/58		mp3
17. "Sound Decision"	"The Martian Queen"	04/02/58	Randall Garrett	mp3
18. "No Way Out"	"Overpopulation"	04/09/58	Robert Silverberg	mp3
19. "Planet of Geniuses"	"Genius"	04/16/58	Poul Anderson	mp3
20. "The Secret That Cannot be Cracked"	"With All The Trappings"	04/23/58	Randall Garrett	
21. "The Cold Equations"	"The Stowaway"	04/30/58	Tom Godwin	mp3
22. "Speak No More"	"Telepaths"	05/07/58	Gordon R. Dickson	mp3
23. "Time Heals"		05/14/58	Poul Anderson	mp3
24. "Time Traveler"	"Meddler's Moon"	05/21/58	George O. Smith	mp3, Realmedia
25. "The Hunting Lodge"	"The Trouble With Robots"	05/28/58	Randall Garrett	Realmedia, mp3
26. "The Diamond Mountain of Venus"	"Inferiority/Venus' Diamond Mountain"	06/04/58	John Fleming	RealMedia, mp3
27. "The Stranger with Roses"	Vincent Deem 1997 / The Man From The Past	06/11/58	John Jakes	mp3
28. "Space Baby"	"First Baby in Space"	06/18/58	Randall Garrett	RealMedia
29. "The Adventure of the Beauty Queen"		06/25/58	John Fleming	mp3

== Unknown ==
Title	Alternate	Air Date	Author	Listen
13. "Shigo Incident"				
19. "New Transylvania"				
"Experimental Planet"				

== Notes ==
- Some of the episode numbers come from RadioGOLDINdex and are pending verification.
- Most of the air dates line up with the list of shows in alphabetical order applied to broadcast dates and are subject to verification.
- Most likely the episode (25), "The Hunting Lodge" is also the unidentified episode labeled "New Transylvania (19)." This is the location mentioned in the audio version of the play of "The Hunting Lodge."
