= Mary Leona Gage =

American actress, model and beauty pageant titleholder

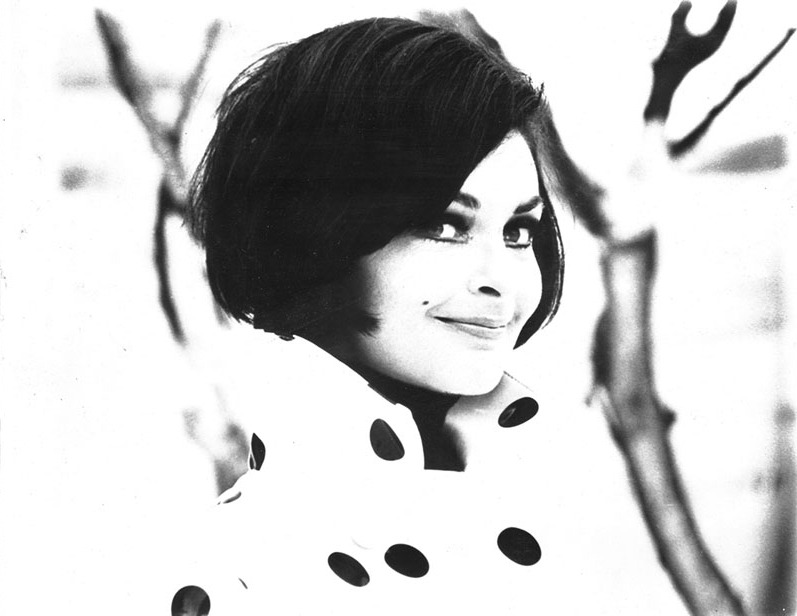
- Gage, circa 1965
- Born: April 8, 1939; Longview, Texas, U.S.
- Died: October 5, 2010 (aged 71); Sherman Oaks, California, U.S.
- Occupations: Actress; model; beauty pageant holder
- Height: 5 ft 9 in (1.75 m)
- Spouse(s): Edward Thacker (m. 1953–1953) Gene Ennis (m. 1953–1958) Nick Covacevich (m. 1958–1961) Gunther Peter Collatz (m. 1962–1964) Alexander Bernard Kaminer (m. 1967–1973) Sixth Husband name and date unknown (before 2010)
- Children: with Gene Ennis, 2 sons, Gene Norris Jr. and David with Nick Covacevich, 1 son, Nicholas Anthony with Gunther Peter Collatz, 1 daughter, Cynthia with Alexander Bernard Kaminer, 1 son, Robert F.
- Beauty pageant titleholder
- Title: Miss Maryland USA 1957; Miss USA 1957 (Dethroned)
- Major competitions: Miss Maryland USA 1957 (Winner); Miss USA 1957 (Winner) (Dethroned); Miss Universe 1957 (Top 15) (Disqualified)

Mary Leona Gage (April 8, 1939 – October 5, 2010) was an American actress, model and beauty pageant titleholder who was crowned Miss USA 1957, the first from Maryland to capture the Miss USA crown. She was stripped of her title when it was revealed that she was 18, married, and the mother of two sons.

== Early life ==
She was a toddler when her parents moved from Longview, Texas to Wichita Falls. Her mother worked two jobs. Her father, paralyzed in an industrial accident, stayed home. She was 13 years old when she met 24-year-old Gene Ennis, an airman in the U.S. Air Force. When Gage became pregnant and attempted to write to Ennis after he shipped out, he never responded. A drugstore employee who was getting married suggested she should get married with a volunteer groom. Gage agreed and they headed to Oklahoma for a double wedding. She married an airman named Edward Thacker. At her mother's insistence, the marriage to Thacker was annulled within the week.

When Ennis came back into her life in 1953, Gage, still only 14, married him in Wichita Falls; they moved to Manhattan Beach, Maryland (near Severna Park). She had their second son at age 16. The marriage quickly unraveled. A doctor suggested that she get a job to ease her pain and prevent a nervous breakdown. She was working in a dress shop in Glen Burnie, Maryland, when she met Barbara Mewshaw, a part-time model. Mewshaw introduced her to the Walters Modeling Agency and helped her enter the Miss Maryland USA pageant. Gage wanted to be in the pageant in the hopes of working as a model. Once entered in the contest, she won.

She told the head of the modeling agency that she was married and could not go to the Miss USA pageant. She claimed one of the pageant officials told her to lie to the public. Pageant officials in Baltimore deny that they told her to lie.

Both women flew to Long Beach, California, for the Miss USA pageant.

== Pageant scandal ==
In July 1957, aged 18, Gage represented state of Maryland at the Miss USA pageant, and was crowned as the winner, the first winner from that state.

Pageant officials launched an investigation after rumors began to surface. Gage initially lied to reporters or declined to comment when they questioned her about her past, but confessed the truth a day later: she was actually 18, not 21, had been married twice, and was a mother of two young sons, which her mother and mother-in-law confirmed to reporters. As being a wife and mother were clear violations of the contest rules, Gage was immediately disqualified and stripped of her Miss USA crown. The crown and prizes subsequently went to the first runner-up, Charlotte Sheffield, Miss Utah.

By the time the truth was revealed, it was too late for Sheffield to replace her in the Miss Universe pageant, as Gage had already competed in the Miss Universe preliminary competition and been announced as one of the Top 15 semifinalists. When Miss Universe officials were informed of the situation, Gage was ejected from the competition, and Mónica Lamas of Argentina, who had placed 16th, replaced Gage as a semifinalist.

The Miss Universe title ultimately was won by Peru's Gladys Zender, who also nearly lost her crown when she was revealed to be only 17 (under the minimum age requirement), but pageant officials allowed her to retain her title, as it was customary at the time in Peru for those that had lived past their sixth month during their birth year to unofficially use the higher age, meaning Zender was considered to be 18 (having lived more than six months as a 17-year-old).

== Aftermath and later life ==
When news of Gage's marriage broke, she was inundated with requests to appear on television. Her appearance on The Ed Sullivan Show was one of CBS's highest rated shows at the time. She also received hate mail.

=== 1957–1964 ===
In 1957, still aged 18, she moved to Las Vegas, Nevada with her two sons. She worked as a featured showgirl at the Hotel Tropicana. In early 1958, Gage divorced Ennis. She met dancer Nick Covacevich, who became her third husband. In 1960, Gage was charged with child abuse. In 1961, she filed for divorce from Covacevich and moved to Los Angeles, California, where she met her eventual fourth husband, an aspiring screenwriter, Gunther Peter Collatz.

In 1962, she appeared in the Roger Corman film Tales of Terror. In 1964, she had a tiny role in the film A House Is Not A Home and divorced Collatz. She experimented with LSD and was seen with John Drew Barrymore and Mickey Hargitay. She also appeared in the 1964 exploitation film Scream of the Butterfly directed by Eber Lobato, co-starring Nélida Lobato.

=== 1965–1980 ===
In November 1965 Gage was found unconscious in a motel room, overdosed on barbiturates after an attempted suicide. She was 26 years old. She spent three weeks at Camarillo State Hospital.

In 1965 her first book was published, My Name Is Leona Gage, Will Somebody Please Help Me? Her picture appeared on the cover of the ghostwritten book. At the end of 1965 she starred in the film Scream of the Butterfly. The film was not received well. After an unsuccessful movie career she enrolled in hairdressing school. In 1966 she began work singing and dancing in burlesque clubs, married for the fifth and sixth times, and had another son for a total of five children, one daughter and four sons. She eventually lost custody of her children. Her daughter lived with her off and on. A comeback attempt in commercials was unsuccessful. In the 1970s and 1980s, she attempted work in mainstream acting roles.

Gage lived in Southern California from the 1960s until her death from heart failure in a hospital many years after being diagnosed with chronic obstructive pulmonary disease.

== Filmography ==
=== Film ===
Year	Title	Role	Notes
1960	Bells Are Ringing	Minor Role (uncredited)	Comedy musical romance film
1962	Tales of Terror	Morella (segment "Morella")	Horror film
1964	A House Is Not a Home	Call Girl	
1965	Scream of the Butterfly	Kathy	Crime film
1966	The Oscar	Actress (uncredited)	

=== Television ===
Year	Title	Role	Notes
1957	The Ed Sullivan Show	Herself (credited as Leona Gage)	Episode: July 21, 1957
1960	Lock-Up	Secretary	Episode: "So Shall Ye Reap"
1963	The Greatest Show on Earth		Episode: "Garve"
