= Miss Colorado USA =

Beauty pageant competition

- Formation: 1952
- Type: Beauty pageant
- Headquarters: Savage
- Location: Minnesota
- Official language: English
- Key people: Denise Wallace; Craig Heitkamp
- Website: Official website

Miss Colorado USA is the beauty pageant that selects the representative for the state of Colorado in the Miss USA pageant, and the name of the title held by its winner. The pageant is directed by Future Productions.

Colorado's most successful placements were in 1963 and 2010, when Rhea Looney and Jessica Hartman, respectively, placed as the third runner-up. Colorado's most recent placement was in 2026, when Jordyn Owen placed in the Top 10.

Jordyn Owen of Catalina Foothills, AZ was appointed Miss Colorado USA on July 30th, 2026 after the open casting call from Thomas Brodeur, the new owner of the national pageant. She represented Colorado at Miss USA 2026, finishing in the top 10.

== Gallery of titleholders ==
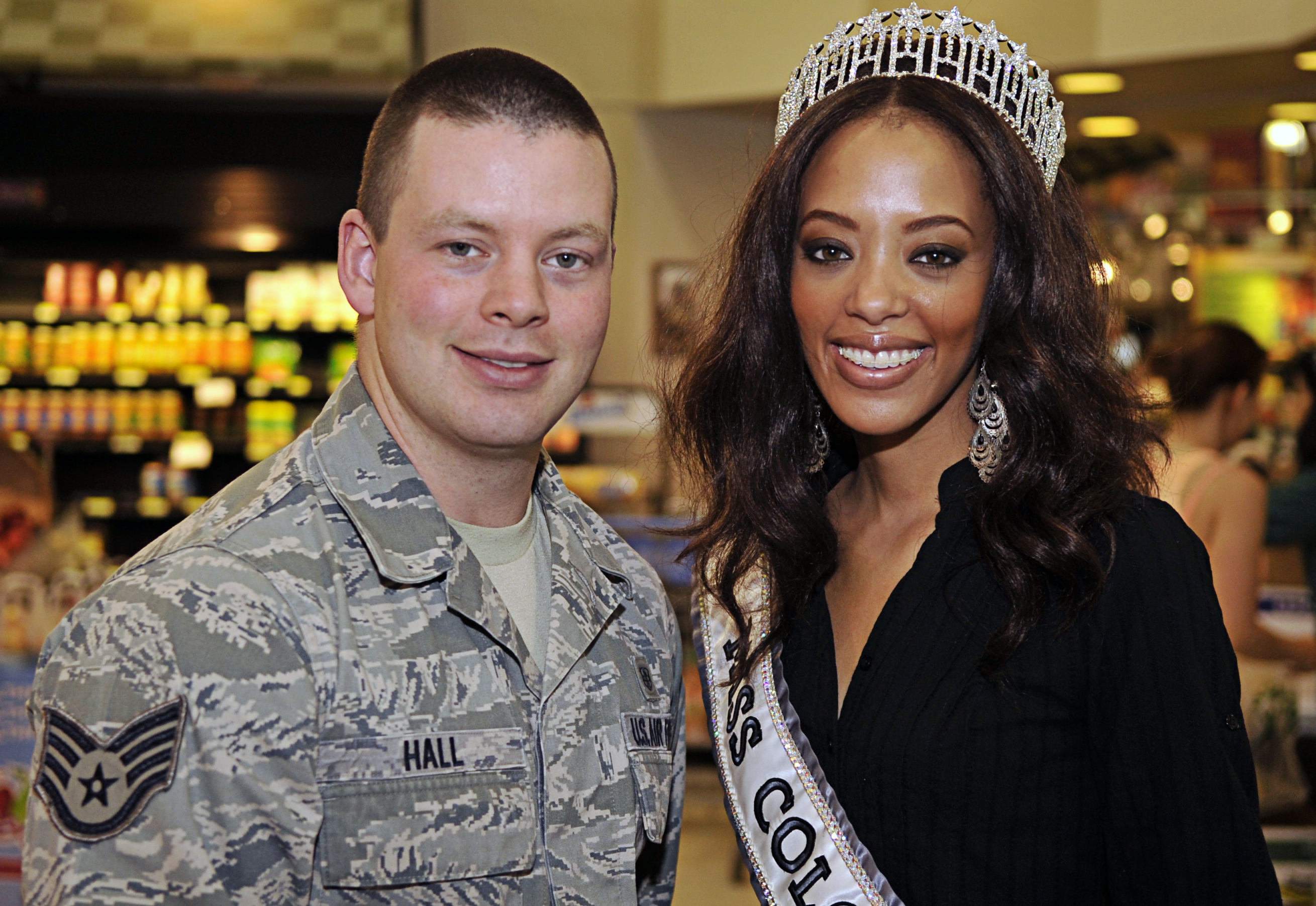
Blair Griffith, Miss Colorado USA 2011

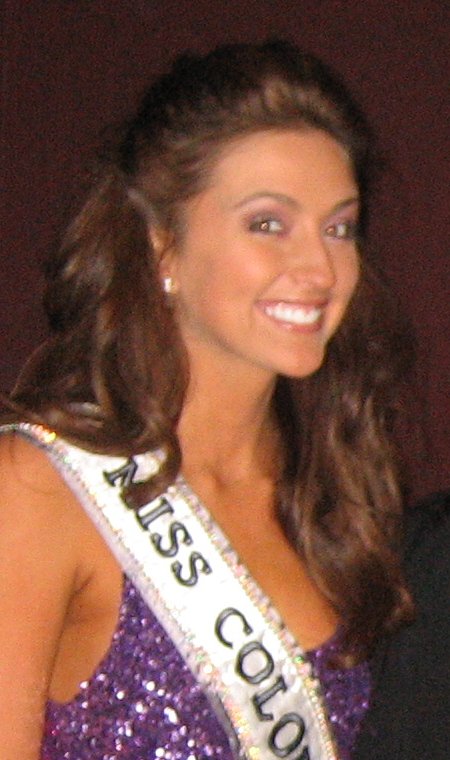
Beckie Hughes, Miss Colorado USA 2008

== Results summary ==
=== Placements ===
- 3rd Runner-Up: Rhea Looney (1963), Jessica Hartman (2010)
- Top 10: Debbie James (1989), Tiani Jones (2000), Marybel Gonzalez (2012), Jessi Kalambayi (2024), Jordyn Owen (2026)
- Top 15/16/20: Jeanie Carroll (1953), Dorothy Jane Bewley (1955), Karen Keeler (1956), Diane Lee Gardner (1959), Penny Jo James (1962), Susan Hawkins (1969)

Colorado holds a record of 13 placements at Miss USA.

=== Awards ===
- Miss Congeniality: Diane Knaub (1971), Crystal Grove (1998)
- Miss Photogenic: Katee Doland (2001), Susan Hawkins (1969)

== Winners ==
Color key

- Winner
- Runner-Up
- Semifinalist

Year	Name	Hometown	Age (Note: Age at the time of the Miss USA pageant)	Local title	Placement at Miss USA	Special awards at Miss USA	Notes
2026	Jordyn Owen	Catalina Foothills, AZ	30	Miss Catalina Foothills	Top 10		
2025	Sydney Hella	Denver	26	Miss Red Rocks			2nd Runner-Up at Miss Colorado USA 2024; Former Miss Earth Air USA 2024
2024	Jessi Kalambayi	Denver	26	Miss Denver	Top 10		
2023	Arianna Lemus	Gunnison	27	Miss Gunnison			
2022	Alexis Glover	Colorado Springs	23	Miss Colorado Springs			Previously Miss Colorado Teen USA 2017
2021	Olivia Lorenzo	Fort Collins	20	Miss Fort Collins			
2020	Emily DeMure	Boulder	21				Later crowned as Miss Grand United States of America 2022; unplaced at Miss Grand International 2022
2019	Madison Dorenkamp	Lamar	25				
2018	Chloe Brown	Grand Junction	22				Previously Miss Colorado Teen USA 2013
2017	Sabrina Janssen	Denver	22				
2016	Caley-Rae Pavillard	Castle Pines	22				Previously Miss Colorado's Outstanding Teen 2008; Previously Miss Colorado Teen USA 2011
2015	Talyah Polee	Denver	26				
2014	Eleanna Livaditis	Centennial	25				
2013	Amanda Wiley	Littleton	25				
2012	Marybel Gonzalez	Denver	24		Top 10		
2011	Blair Griffith	Lakewood	22				Previously Miss Colorado Teen USA 2006 and Miss Congeniality at Miss Teen USA 2006; Later Miss Grand USA 2013
2010	Jessica Hartman	Pueblo	19		3rd Runner-Up		Later Miss Missouri 2014
2009	Patrice Williams	Colorado Springs	22				
2008	Beckie Hughes	Grand Junction	21				
2007	Keena Bonella	Grand Junction	21				
2006	Jacqueline Madera	Denver	26				
2005	Lauren Cisneros	Castle Rock	23				
2004	Janel Haw	Aurora	26				
2003	Erin MacGregor	Vail	26				Previously Miss Colorado 1999
2002	Keely Gaston	Morrison	24				Previously Miss Colorado 1998
2001	Katee Doland	Arvada	20			Miss Photogenic	Previously Miss Colorado Teen USA 1998; Later Miss Colorado 2003; Former Denver Broncos cheerleader
2000	Tiani Jones	Aurora	23		Top 10		
1999	Susan Manuello	Boulder					
1998	Michelle Stanley	Littleton					Previously Miss Colorado 1996
1997	Damien Munoz	Westminster					
1996	Suesan Rajabi	Englewood					
1995	Emily Weeks	Denver					
1994	Kimberly Veldhuizen	Denver					
1993	Janna Durbin	Golden					Previously Miss Colorado Teen USA 1989
1992	Laura Dewild	Denver					
1991	Melanie Ness	Pueblo					
1990	Michelle Harrison	Conifer					
1989	Debbie James	Denver	21		Top 10		Previously Miss Colorado Teen USA 1985
1988	Nicola Svaldi	Aurora					
1987	Polly Kuska	Denver					
1986	Cheryl Rohleder	Denver					
1985	Lynnette Jessen	Denver	23				Previously Miss Colorado 1981
1984	Michelle Anderson	Denver	20				
1983	Lisa Gay Trujillo	Denver					
1982	Dusty Hutton	Longmont					
1981	Shannon Davidson	Boulder					
1980	Shelley Marks	Littleton					
1979	Jene Nelson	Pueblo					
1978	Linda Marie Potestio	Pueblo	18				
1977	Mary Anne Genzel	Denver					
1976	Patricia Sweany	Lamar					
1975	Amelia Barbara "Amy" Long	Lakewood					
1974	Connie Larsen	Denver					
1973	Lenita Mosley	Denver					
1972	Patricia Cadigan	Lakeland					
1971	Diane Lynn Knaub	Denver				Miss Congeniality	
1970	Linda Hicklin	Greeley					
1969	Susan Hawkins	Colorado Springs	23		Top 15	Miss Photogenic	
1968	Ann Bell	Littleton					
1967	Kathleen "Kim" Kelly	Denver	18	Miss Greenland			
1966	Rosemary Barnwell						
1965	Cathy McPherson						
Did not compete at Miss USA 1964
1963	Rhea Looney	Denver			3rd runner-up		
1962	Penny James				Top 16		
Did not compete at Miss USA 1961
1960	Karen Eickermann						
1959	Dianne Gardner				Top 15		
1958	Devona Hubka						
1957	Mary Clapham						
1956	Karen Keeler				Top 15		
1955	Dorothy Bewley				Top 15		
1954	Lorna Batterson						
1953	Jeanie Carroll				Top 20		
1952	Joan Linn						
