= Miss USA 1980 =

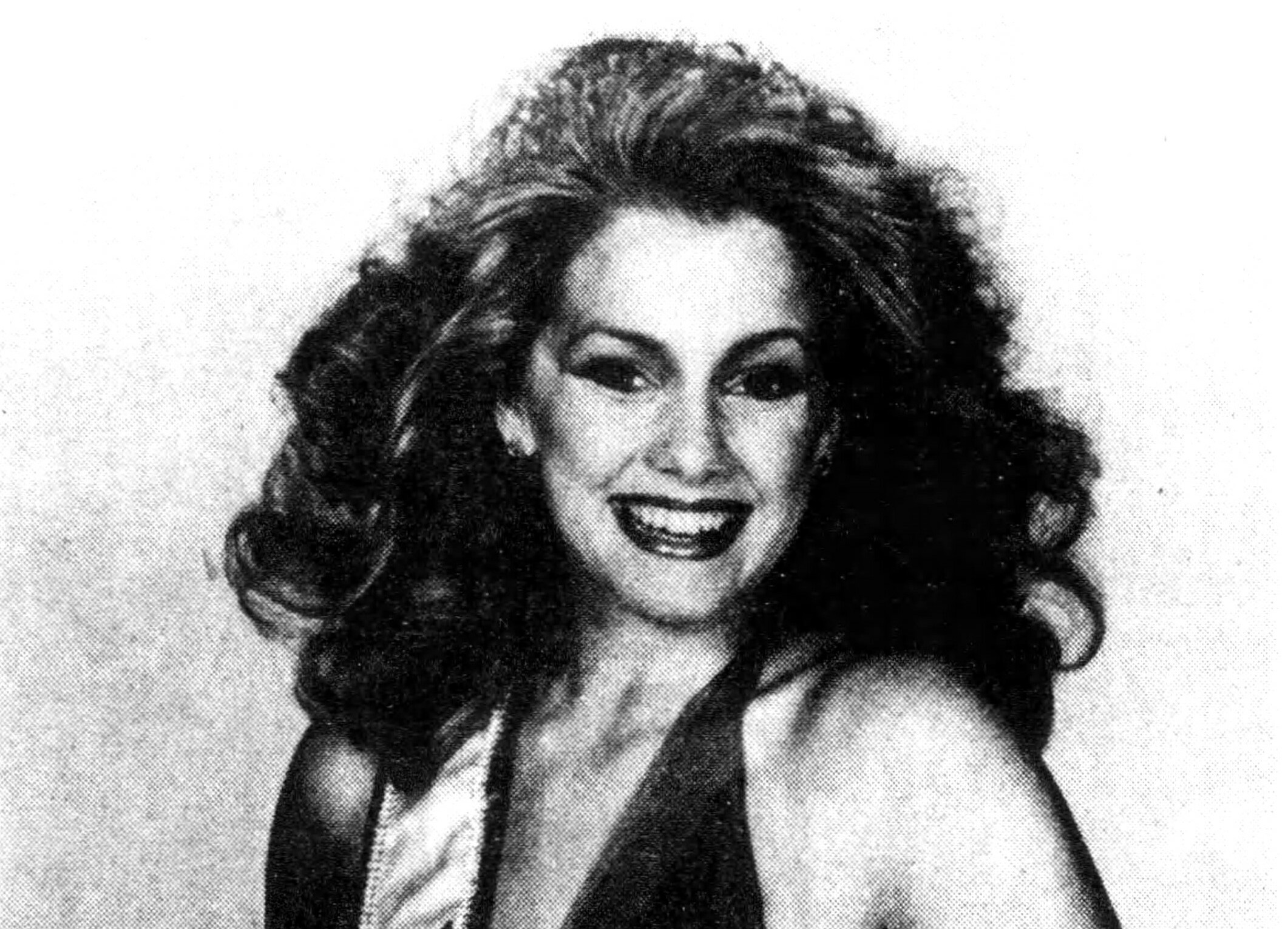
- Jineane Ford, Miss USA 1980
- Date: May 15, 1980
- Presenters: Bob Barker; Helen O'Connell; Jayne Kennedy
- Entertainment: Donny Osmond
- Venue: Gulf Coast Convention Center, Biloxi, Mississippi
- Broadcaster: CBS; WJTV
- Entrants: 51
- Placements: 12
- Winner: Shawn Weatherly; South Carolina

Miss USA 1980 was the 29th Miss USA pageant, televised live on May 15 from the Gulf Coast Convention Center in Biloxi, Mississippi on CBS.

The pageant was won by Shawn Weatherly of South Carolina, who succeeded Mary Therese Friel of New York. Weatherly would later win the Miss Universe 1980 pageant, and first runner-up Jineane Ford of Arizona inherited the Miss USA title for the remainder of the year. Weatherly later became an actress, featured in the television series Baywatch.

== Results ==
=== Placements ===
Final results	Contestant
Miss USA 1980	South Carolina – Shawn Weatherly
1st Runner-Up	Arizona – Jineane Ford ∞
2nd Runner-Up	Florida – Barbara Bowser
3rd Runner-Up	Alabama – Pamela Rigas
4th Runner-Up	Kentucky – Lisa Devillez
Top 12	Minnesota – Carla Peterson; Maryland – Tonja Walker; Nebraska – Rebecca "Becky" Staab; New Hampshire – Eva Dyer; (New York (state)) New York – Debra "Debbie" Maurice; New Mexico – Kathy Patrick; Texas – Barbara Buckley

∞ Weatherly won Miss Universe 1980. Due to protocol, Weatherly relinquished her title and the 1st runner-up, Jineane Ford, assumed the Miss USA title.

=== Special awards ===
Award	Contestant
Miss Congeniality	Montana – Robbin English
Miss Photogenic	Arizona – Jineane Ford; Ohio – Kim Thomas
Best State Costume	Ohio - Kim Thomas

== Delegates ==
The Miss USA 1980 delegates were:

- Alabama – Pamela Rigas
- Alaska – Debby Fickus
- Arizona – Jineane Ford
- Arkansas – Susie Owens
- California - Kari Lloyd
- Colorado – Shelley Marks
- Connecticut – Kristine Wilson
- Delaware – Karen Giobbe
- (Washington, D.C.) District of Columbia – Marianne Ritter
- Florida – Barbara Bowser
- (Georgia (U.S. state)) Georgia – April Reid
- Hawaii – Carol Ching
- Idaho – Marta Vincen
- Illinois – Karen Marie Groat
- Indiana – Susan Osby
- Iowa – Lori Kromminga
- Kansas – Lisa Boyd
- Kentucky – Lisa Devillez
- Louisiana – Kelly Bonin
- Maine – Victoria Elias
- Maryland – Tonja Walker
- Massachusetts – Diane Campbell
- Michigan – Teena Hammonds
- Minnesota – Carla Peterson
- Mississippi – Cheri Brown
- Missouri – Kelly Laxon
- Montana – Robbin English
- Nebraska – Rebecca "Becky" Staab
- Nevada – Kimberlee Guider
- New Hampshire – Eva Dyer
- New Jersey – Joni Peifer
- New Mexico – Kathy Patrick
- (New York (state)) New York – Debra "Debbie" Maurice
- North Carolina – Lori Boggs
- North Dakota – Kim Thompson
- Ohio – Elizabeth Kim Thomas
- Oklahoma – Martha Streightoff
- Oregon – Martha Viducich
- Pennsylvania – Andrea Patrick
- Rhode Island – Robyn Hall
- South Carolina – Shawn Weatherly
- South Dakota – Jane Schmidt
- Tennessee – Diane Hunt
- Texas – Barbara Buckley
- Utah – Tamara Parsons
- Vermont – Judi Mason
- Virginia – Kelly Humphrey
- (Washington (state)) Washington – Janet Brown
- West Virginia – Linda Hendrick
- Wisconsin – Susan McGaffigan
- Wyoming – Suzie Harris

== Judges ==
- Judi Andersen – Miss USA 1978 from Hawaii
- Gerald Fitzgerald – associate editor of Opera News magazine
- Uri Geller – illusionist
- Anita Gillette – actress, singer
- Lloyd Haynes – actor
- Bob Kane – comic book writer, co-creator of Batman
- Richard Kline – actor
- Peter Max – artist
- Joan Prather – actress
- Rosemary Rogers – author
- Rosie Vela – model, actress, singer-songwriter
- Adam West – actor
