= Miss Nevada USA =

Beauty pageant competition

- Formation: 1952; 74 years ago
- Type: Beauty pageant
- Headquarters: Las Vegas
- Location: Nevada
- Members: Miss USA
- Official language: English
- Exec. Director: Shanna Moakler
- Website: Official website

The Miss Nevada USA competition is the pageant that selects the representative for the state of Nevada in the Miss USA pageant.

While Nevada did well in the early years of the Miss USA pageant, they only placed once from 1987 to 2000. This streak was broken by Gina Giacinto's finalist placing in Miss USA 2001. Many Miss Nevada USA titleholders previously competed in the Miss Teen USA and Miss America pageants. Seven titleholders previously held the Miss Teen USA state titles six of which having won Miss Nevada Teen USA and the other was Miss Washington Teen USA, three held the Miss Nevada Crown in the Miss America Pageant.

Nia Sanchez of Las Vegas became the first Miss USA ever from the state of Nevada when she was crowned Miss USA 2014, she later placed first runner-up in Miss Universe 2014 to Paulina Vega of Colombia.

Natalie Bode of Las Vegas was crowned Miss Nevada USA 2026 on June 18, 2026, at Westgate Las Vegas Resort & Casino in Las Vegas. She will represent Nevada at Miss USA 2026.

== Gallery of titleholders ==
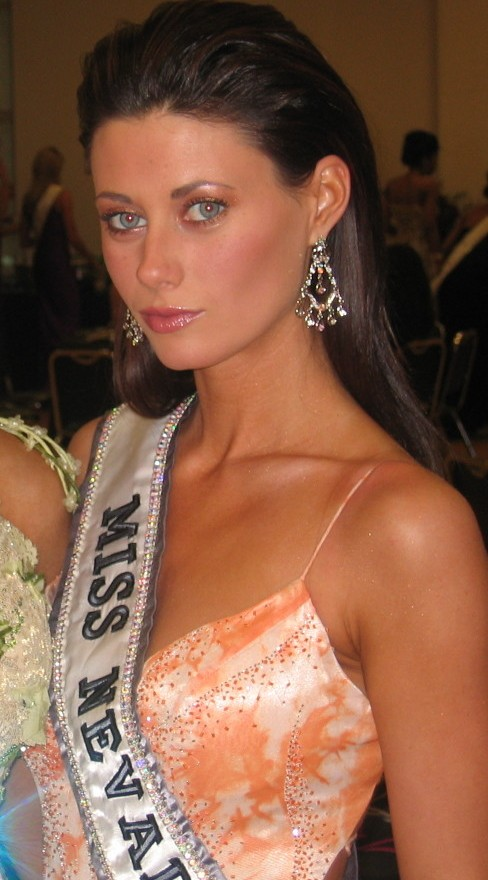
Lauren Scyphers, Miss Nevada USA 2006

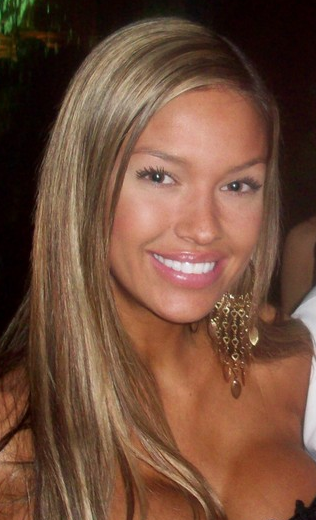
Helen Salas after placing first runner-up in Miss Nevada USA 2007, she became Miss Nevada USA after Katie Rees was stripped of her crown.

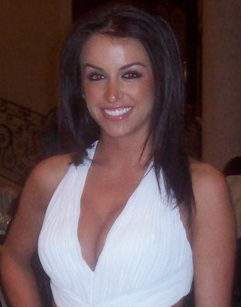
Veronica Grabowski, Miss Nevada USA 2008

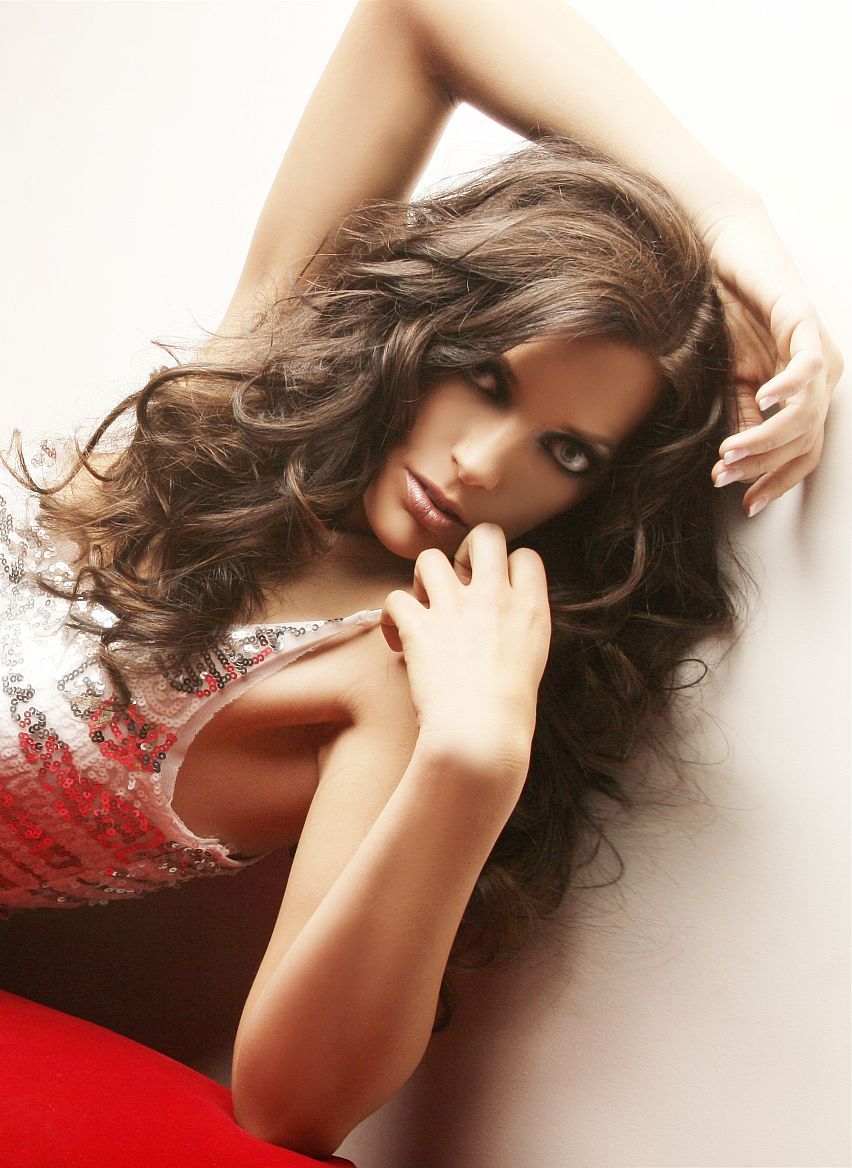
Julianna Erdesz, Miss Nevada USA 2010

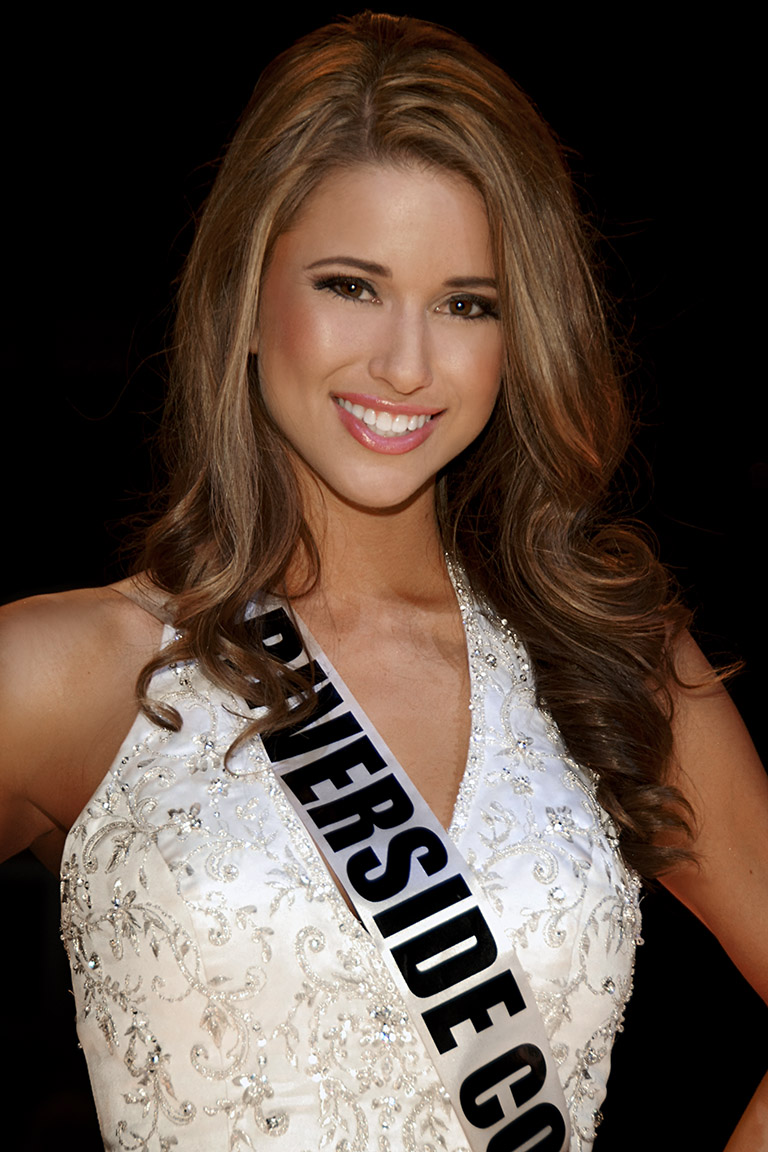
Nia Sanchez, Miss Nevada USA 2014 and Miss USA 2014

== Results summary ==
=== Placements ===
- Miss USA: Nia Sanchez (2014)
- 1st runner-up: Mary O'Neal Contino (1977)
- 2nd runners-up: Joan Adams (1957), Karen Weller (1961), Kathy Landry (1968), Sharon "Sheri" Schruhl (1970), Carolina Urrea (2018)
- 3rd runners-up: Jade Kelsall (2012), Brittany McGowan (2015)
- 4th runners-up: Janet Hadland (1962), Helen Salas (2007), Mary Sickler (2025)
- Top 5: Gia Giacinto (2001), Tianna Tuamoheloa (2019)
- Top 10/11/12: Linda Dryden (1974), Christa Lane Daniel (1983), Tammy Perkins (1987), Chelsea Caswell (2013), Natalie Bode (2026)
- Top 15/16/19/20: Earlene Whitt (1953), Joy Blaine (1959), Kathee Francis (1963), Denyse Turner (1965), Jacqueline Moore (1967), Karen Essklinger (1969), Lauren Scyphers (2006), Victoria Olona (2020), Josie Stephens (2023), Najah Ali (2024)

Nevada holds a record of 29 placements at Miss USA.

=== Awards ===
- Miss Congeniality: Alesia Prentiss (1992)
- Best State Costume: Lagracella Omran (1988)

== Winners ==
Color key

- Declared as winner of Miss USA
- Ended as runner-up for Miss USA
- Ended as one of the finalists or semifinalists for Miss USA

Year	Name	Hometown	Age^{1}	Local title	Placement	Special awards	Notes
2026	Natalie Bode	Las Vegas	27	Miss South Las Vegas	Top 10		
2025	Mary Sickler	Las Vegas	23	Miss Western Nevada	4th runner-up		1st Runner-Up in Miss Texas USA 2025; Later 1st Runner-Up in Miss World America 2026; Represented United States at Miss World 2026
2024	Najah Ali	Las Vegas	23	Miss Silver State	Top 20		
2023	Josie Stephens	Fallon	27	Miss Sun Valley	Top 20		
2022	Summer Keffeler	Paradise	21	Miss Paradise			Previously Miss Washington Teen USA 2018; Sister of Stormy Keffeler, original titleholder of Miss Washington USA 2016
2021	Kataluna Enriquez	Las Vegas	27	Miss Silver State			First openly transgender woman to compete at Miss USA.
2020	Victoria Olona	Henderson	27	Miss Paradise	Top 16		Winner of the Fan Vote at Miss USA 2020
2019	Tianna Tuamoheloa	North Las Vegas	25	Miss Silver State	Top 5		
2018	Carolina Urrea	Sunrise Manor	23	Miss Paradise	2nd runner-up		Contestant on Nuestra Belleza Latina 2013
2017	Lauren York	Primm	22	Miss North Las Vegas			
2016	Emelina Adams	Anthem	23	Miss Henderson			1st runner-up Miss Arizona USA 2015
2015	Brittany McGowan	Spring Valley	24	Miss Chateau	3rd runner-up		
2014	Nia Sanchez	Southern Highlands	23	Miss South Las Vegas	Miss USA 2014		1st runner-up at Miss Universe 2014
2013	Chelsea Caswell	Summerlin	23	Miss West Las Vegas	Top 10		
2012	Jade Kelsall	Las Vegas	26	Miss Whitney Ranch	3rd runner-up		
2011	Sarah Chapman	Henderson	27	Miss Henderson			Sister of Miss California USA 2004 Ellen Chapman
2010	Julianna Erdesz	Reno	25	Miss Reno			Previously Miss Nevada 2008
2009	Georgina Vaughan	Las Vegas	20	Miss Red Rock			Previously Miss Nevada Teen USA 2006.
2008	Veronica Grabowski	Henderson	23	Miss Henderson			
2007	Helen Salas	Las Vegas	21		4th runner-up		Originally first runner-up, assumed the title after Katie Rees was stripped of her crown; Previously Miss Nevada Teen USA 2004; 2nd runner-up at Miss Teen USA 2004
2007	Katie Rees	Las Vegas	22		did not compete		Stripped of the title on December 21, 2006, due to inappropriate photographs.
2006	Lauren Scyphers	Gardnerville	20		Top 15		
2005	Shivonn Geeb	Las Vegas	25				Originally first runner-up, assumed the title after Sloan Bailey's resignation
2005	Sloan Bailey	Las Vegas			did not compete		Resigned in January 2005 for personal reasons.
2004	Victoria Franklin	Las Vegas	20				Previously Miss Nevada Teen USA 1998; 2nd runner up in Miss Teen USA 1998
2003	Ashley Huff	Henderson	22				Previously Miss Nevada 2001
2002	Jenny Valdez	Las Vegas					Contestant at National Sweetheart 2000 & 2001
2001	Gina Giacinto	Las Vegas	26		Top 5		Previously Miss Nevada 1999
2000	Alicia Denyse Carnes	Las Vegas	22				Previously Miss Nevada Teen USA 1995
1999	Shaynee Smith	Las Vegas	23				
1998	Tammie Rankin	Las Vegas					Previously Miss Nevada Teen USA 1993
1997	Ninya Perna	Green Valley	23				
1996	Alisa Castillo	Las Vegas					
1995	Brook Hammon	Las Vegas					Previously Miss Nevada Teen USA 1991
1994	Angela Lambert	Las Vegas					
1993	Alexis Oliver	Las Vegas					
1992	Alesia Prentiss	Las Vegas				Miss Congeniality	
1991	Jodi Jensen	Las Vegas					
1990	Michele Yegge	Las Vegas					
1989	Janu Tornell	Las Vegas					Contestant on Survivor: Palau
1988	Lagracella Omran	Las Vegas	20			Best State Costume	
1987	Tammy Perkins	Las Vegas	21		Semi-finalist, Finishing in 8th Place		
1986	LeAnna Grant	Las Vegas					Previously Miss Nevada 1984
1985	Alicia Berger	Las Vegas					Host of Access Hollywood, judge of Miss USA 2009 pageant
1984	Donna Lee McNeil	Las Vegas					
1983	Christa Lane Daniel	Las Vegas			Semi-finalist, Finishing in 7th Place		
1982	Andrea Pennington	Las Vegas					
1981	Mary Agnes Lebsock	Las Vegas	23				
1980	Kimberlee Guider	Las Vegas					
1979	Aleasha Magleby	Las Vegas					
1978	Dawn Jameson	Las Vegas					
1977	Mary O'Neal Contino	Las Vegas			1st runner-up		Played lead role in Australian television series Chuck Finn
1976	Janice Carrell	Las Vegas					Represented Nevada at the 1975 Miss World USA pageant
1975	Madonna Allison	Las Vegas					
1974	Linda Dryden	Las Vegas			Semi-finalist		
1973	Laura Fritz	Las Vegas					
1972	Tracey Lynn Whitney	Las Vegas					
1971	Anita Jean Laurie	Las Vegas					
1970	Sharon "Sheri" Lee Schruhl	Las Vegas		Miss Flamingo	2nd runner-up		
1969	Karen Esslinger	Las Vegas		Miss Flamingo	Semi-finalist		
1968	Kathy Landry	Las Vegas	22		2nd runner-up	Top 15 Best in Swimsuit	
1967	Jacqueline Moore	Las Vegas	19		Semi-finalist		
1966	Mary Martin	Las Vegas					
1965	Denyse Turner	Las Vegas	23		Top 15		Originally second runner-up, assumed the title after Bonnie Baxter's resignation
1965	Bonnie Baxter	Las Vegas	21		did not compete		Originally first runner-up, assumed the title after Sharon Granda was stripped of her crown; Resigned from the title due to "illness in the family"
1965	Sharon Granda		17		did not compete		Withdrawn because younger than 18 for Miss Universe
1964	Pamela Diane Morris	Las Vegas					
1963	Kathee Francis	Las Vegas	20		Top 15		
1962	Janet Hadland	Las Vegas	19		4th runner-up		
1961	Karen Weller	Las Vegas			2nd runner-up		
1960	Did Not Compete						
1959	Joy Blaine	Las Vegas			Semi-finalist		
1958	Terry Jeffers	Las Vegas					
1957	Joan Adams	Las Vegas			2nd runner-up		She finished as 3rd runner-up, but succeeded to 2nd runner-up when the 2nd runner-up took the place of the 1st runner-up
1956	Marley Sanderson	Las Vegas					
1955	Did Not Compete						
1954	Mary Jane Arnold	Las Vegas					
1953	Earlene Whitt	Las Vegas			Semi-finalist		
1952	Barbara Jean Clark	Las Vegas					

^{1} Age at the time of the Miss USA pageant
