= Miss Arizona USA =

American beauty pageant competition

- Formation: 1952
- Type: Beauty pageant
- Headquarters: Phoenix
- Location: Arizona
- Members: Miss USA
- Official language: English
- Key people: Sebastien Verstraet (Director and Executive Producer)
- Website: Official website

Miss Arizona USA is the beauty pageant that selects the representative for the state of Arizona in the Miss USA pageant, and the name of the title held by its winner. The pageant is directed by Casting Crown Productions.

Arizona's most successful placements were in 1965 and 1980, when Jane Nelson and Jineane Ford, respectively, placed as the first runner-up. Ford later became Miss USA 1980 after the original winner Shawn Weatherly was crowned Miss Universe 1980. Arizona's most recent placement was in 2016, when Chelsea Myers placed in the Top 15.

The longest reigning titleholder was Yesenia Vidales in 2020 at 1 year, 6 months and 5 days, while Cassidy Jo Jacks was the shortest reigning titleholder in 2021 ended her reign at 10 months and 19 days.

The current Miss Arizona USA is Kaitlyn Humphrey of Scottsdale and was crowned at The Kimpton Miralina Resort & Villas in Scottsdale on June 13, 2026. Humphrey will represent Arizona at Miss USA 2026.

== Gallery of titleholders ==
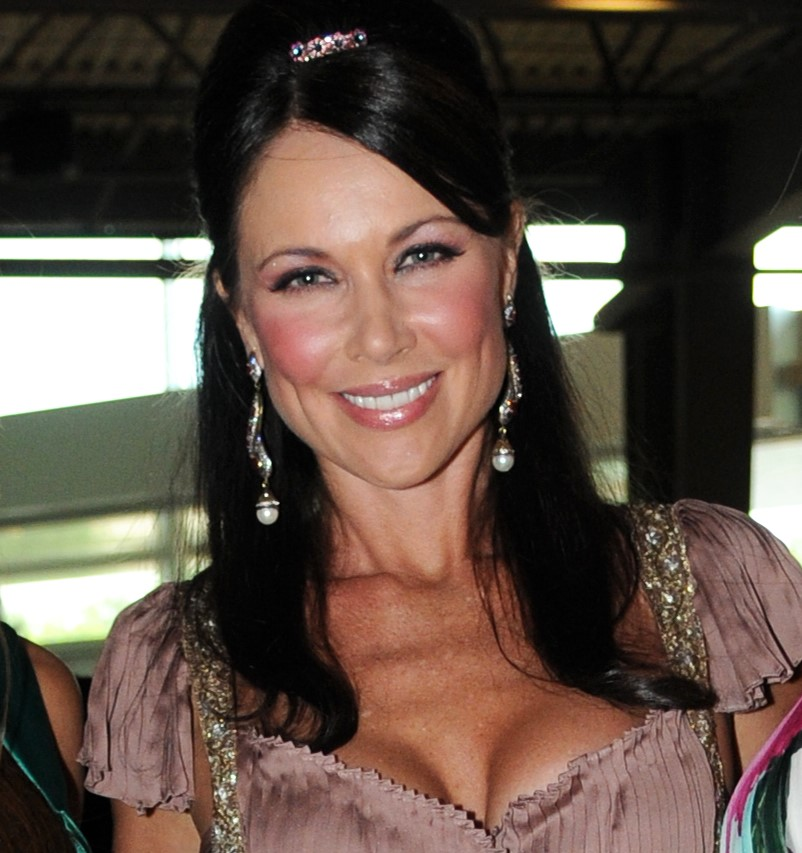
LeeAnne Locken, Miss Arizona USA 1989

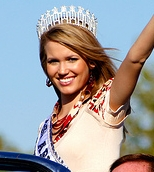
Courtney Barnas, Miss Arizona USA 2007

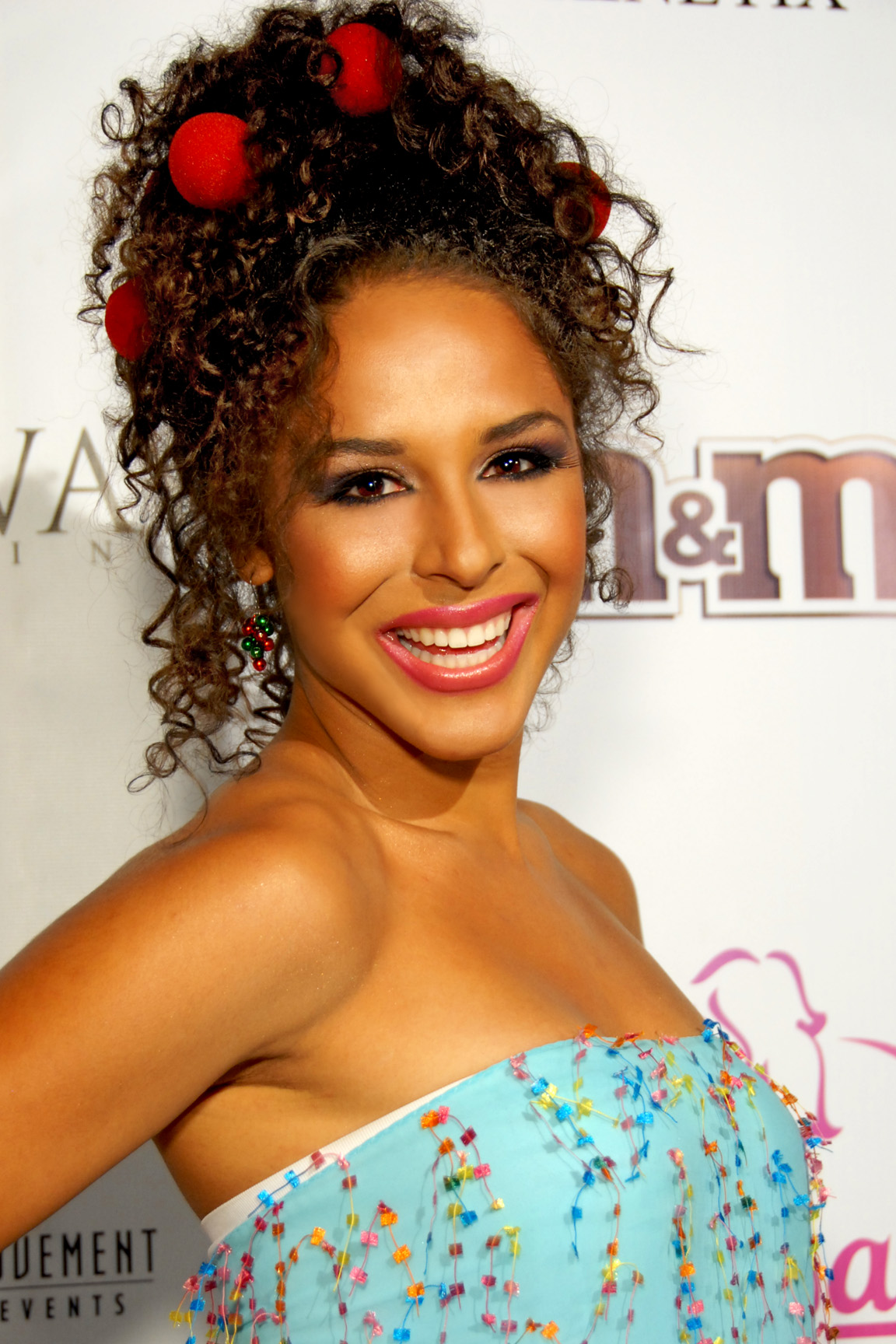
Brittany Bell, Miss Arizona USA 2010

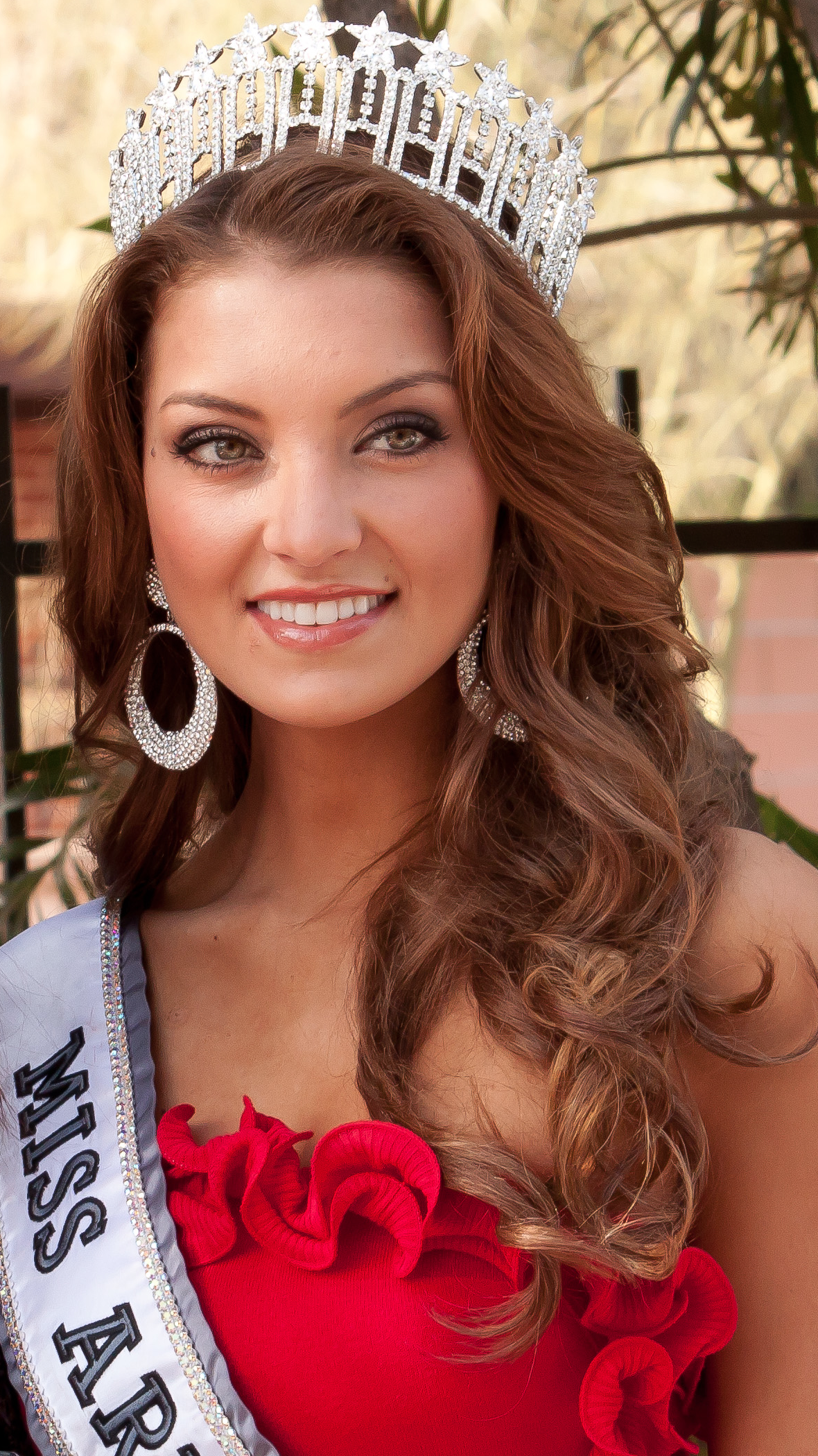
Brittany Brannon, Miss Arizona USA 2011

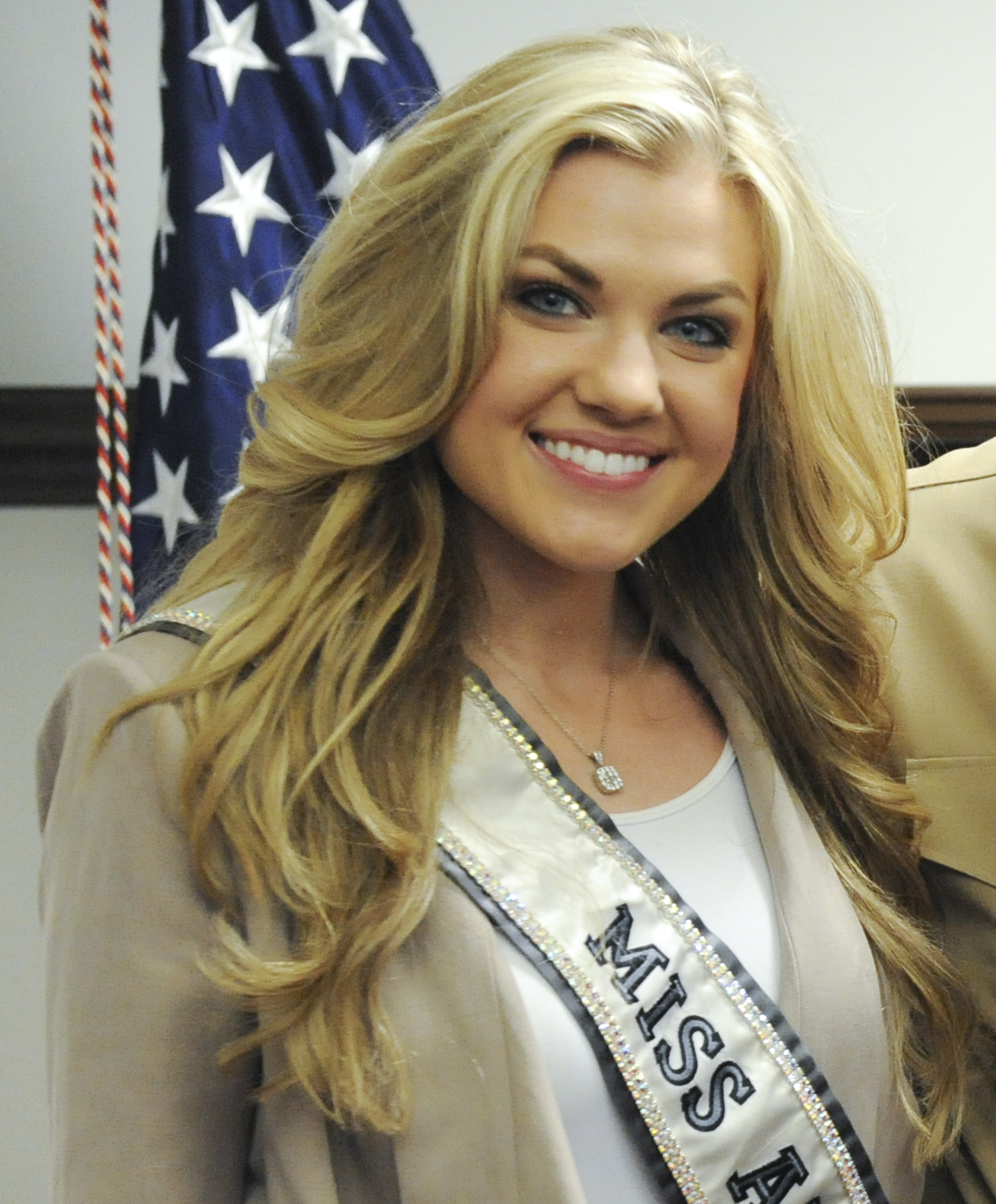
Erika Frantzve, Miss Arizona USA 2012

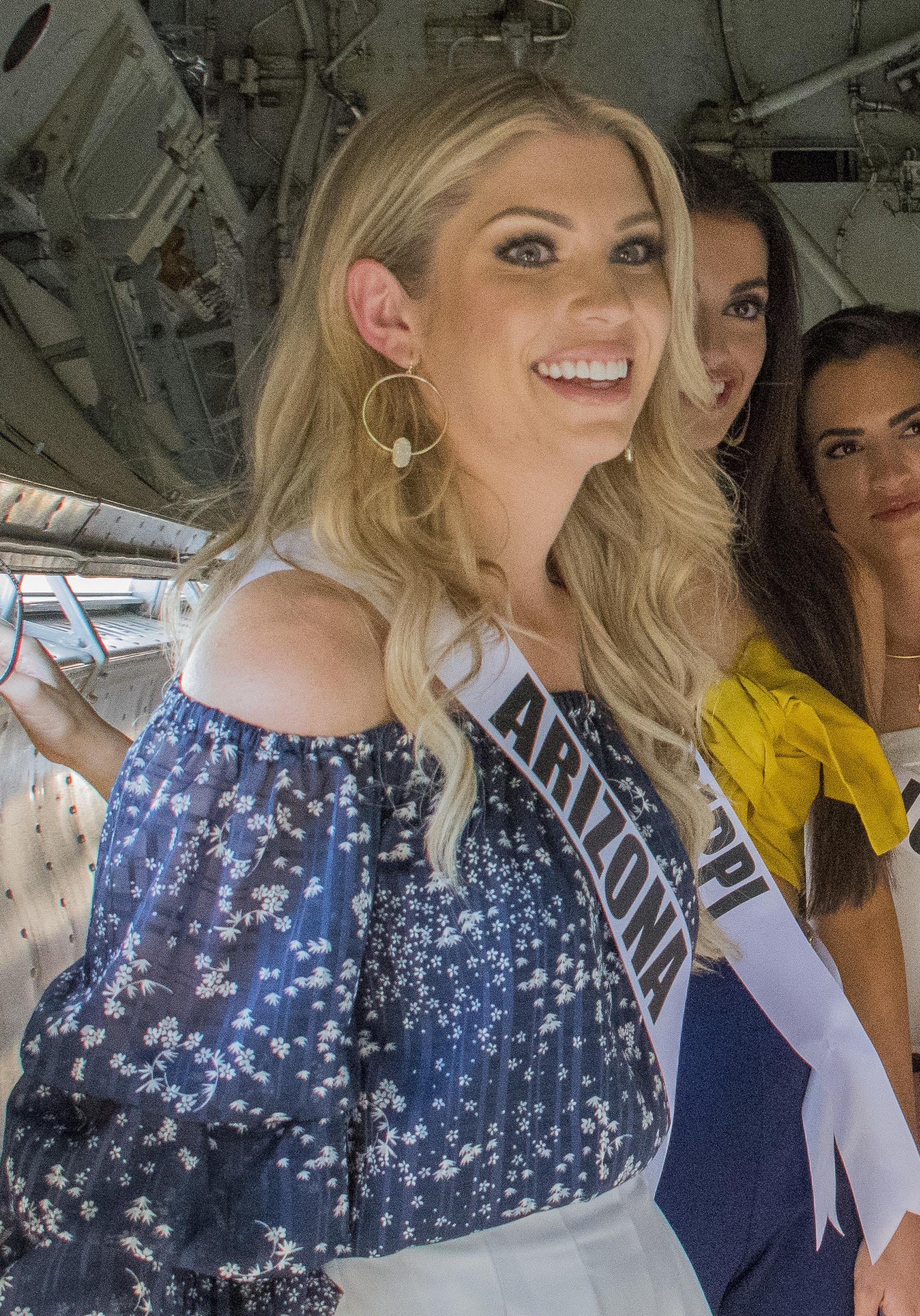
Nicole Smith, Miss Arizona USA 2018

== Results summary ==
=== Placements in Miss USA ===
- 1st Runners-Up: Jane Nelson (1965), Jineane Ford (1980) (Note: Ford originally placed as the first runner-up at Miss USA 1980, but inherited the crown after the original winner Shawn Weatherly was crowned Miss Universe 1980. The two titles cannot be held simultaneously.)
- 2nd Runners-Up: Susanne Pottenger (1971), Diane Martin (1987), Alicia-Monique Blanco (2009)
- 3rd Runners-Up: Ruth Harris (1969), Sherry Nix (1973)
- Top 10/11/12: Carlys Peterson (1974), Toni Abranovic (1977), Ana Rupert (1979), Cassie Hill (1981), Michelle Ducote (1985), LeeAnne Locken (1989), Maricarroll Verlinde (1991), Dannis Shephard (1992), Stacey Kole (1998)
- Top 15/16/20: Jerri Michaelson (1962), Diane McGarry (1963), Roxanne Neeley (1966), Judianne Magnusson (1967), Danielle Demski (2004), Brenna Sakas (2006), Brittany Brannon (2011), Jordan Wessel (2014), Maureen Montagne (2015), Chelsea Myers (2016), Kaitlyn Humphrey (2026)

Arizona holds a record of 27 placements at Miss USA.

=== Awards ===
- Miss Congeniality: Cara Jackson (1999)
- Miss Photogenic: Jineane Ford (1980), Brittany Brannon (2011)
- Best State Costume: Daria Sparling (1984), Michelle Ducote (1985), Maricarroll Verlinde (1991)

== Winners ==
Color key

- Winner
- Runner-Up
- Semifinalist

Year	Name	Age (Note: Age at the time of the Miss USA pageant)	Hometown	Local title	Placement at Miss USA	Special awards at Miss USA	Notes
2026	Kaitlyn Humphrey	23	Scottsdale	Miss Tempe	Top 20		
2025	Elexes Richardson	30	Scottsdale	Miss North Scottsdale			
2024	K Johnson	41	Phoenix	Miss Uptown Phoenix			
2023	Candace Kanavel	27	Tempe	Miss Tempe			
2022	Isabel Ticlo	28	Phoenix	Miss Phoenix			Previously Miss Arizona 2018; First Indian American and Thai American Miss Arizona USA
2021	Cassidy Jo Jacks	26	Mesa	Miss Usery Mountain			Later contestant on season 1 of Farmer Wants a Wife
2020	Yesenia Vidales	23	Phoenix	Miss Uptown Phoenix			
2019	Savannah Wix	22	Paradise Valley	Miss Saguaro Blossom			Previously Miss Arizona Teen USA 2014
2018	Nicole Smith	24	Phoenix	Miss Phoenix			
2017	Tommy Lynn Calhoun	26	Tucson	Miss Sunset Canyon			
2016	Chelsea Myers	20	Chandler	Miss North Phoenix	Top 15		
2015	Maureen Montagne	21	Chandler	Miss South Chandler	Top 15		First Asian American Miss Arizona USA; Previously 1st runner-up at Mutya ng Pilipinas 2013; Later placed 1st Runner-Up at Miss World America 2017; Later joined Miss World Philippines 2018 and was crowned Miss Eco Philippines 2018; Later became 1st runner-up at Miss Eco International 2018 as Miss Philippines; Later joined Binibining Pilipinas 2021 and was crowned Binibining Pilipinas Globe 2021; Later crowned The Miss Globe 2021 as Miss Philippines
2014	Jordan Wessel	20	Phoenix	Miss Tempe	Top 20		
2013	Rachel Massie	19	Glendale	Miss Maricopa County			
2012	Erika Lane Frantzve	23	Scottsdale	Miss Phoenix			Previously National American Miss Teen Arizona 2006; Later married to Charlie Kirk
2011	Brittany Brannon	22	Paradise Valley	Miss Grand Canyon	Top 16	Miss Photogenic	
2010	Brittany Bell	22	Chandler	Miss Chandler			Later Miss Guam Universe 2014
2009	Alicia-Monique Blanco	22	Phoenix	Miss Diamondback	2nd Runner-Up		
2008	Kimberly Joiner	22	Gilbert	Miss Gilbert			
2007	Courtney Barnas	19	Mesa	Miss Red Mountain			
2006	Brenna Sakas	21	Chandler	Miss Chandler	Top 15		
2005	Mariana Loya	26	Gilbert				Previously Miss Washington 1998
2004	Danielle Demski	22	Chandler	Miss East Valley	Top 15		Previously Miss Arizona Teen USA 1999; Former NFL Cheerleader for the Arizona Cardinals
2003	Nafeesa DeFlorias	26	Phoenix	Miss Valley of the Sun			
2002	Jennifer Lenz	25	Mesa	Miss Mesa			
2001	Tasha Dixon	19	Phoenix	Miss Hispanic AZ			
2000	Heather Keckler	26	Scottsdale				Previously Miss Arizona Teen USA 1992
1999	Cara Jackson	25	Chandler			Miss Congeniality	Previously Miss Arizona 1995
1998	Stacey Kole	24	Tempe		Top 10		Runner-up at Miss Arizona 1995
1997	Jessica Elizabeth Shahriari	23	Gilbert				
1996	Christina Novak		Tempe				
1995	Shara Riggs		Oro Valley				
1994	Jennifer Tisdale		Mesa				
1993	Apryl Hettich		Scottsdale				
1992	Dannis Shephard		Mesa		Top 11		
1991	Maricarroll Verlinde		Tempe		Top 11	Best State Costume	
1990	Lezlie Leonard		Tempe				
1989	LeeAnne Locken		Apache Junction		Top 10		Cast member on The Real Housewives of Dallas (2016–2020)
1988	Kris Lynn Keim	22	Scottsdale				Previously Miss Arizona Teen USA 1983; First runner-up at Miss Arizona USA 1987
1987	Diane Lynn Martin	24	Tempe		2nd runner-up		Previously Miss Arizona 1985; Top 15 at Miss Asia Pacific 1987
1986	Jodi Lee Armstrong		Phoenix				
1985	Michelle Ducote	22	Tempe		Top 10	Best State Costume	
1984	Daria Joi Sparling	20	Tucson			Best State Costume	First runner-up at Miss Arizona USA 1983
1983	Sindy Lou Hedden	21	Tucson				First runner-up at Miss Arizona USA 1981; Finalist at Miss Arizona USA 1982
1982	Lori Diane Hakola	19	Tucson				
1981	Cassie Denise Hill		Phoenix		Top 12		
1980	Jineane Marie Ford	20	Gilbert		1st runner-up	Miss Photogenic	Became Miss USA 1980 when Shawn Weatherly became Miss Universe 1980
1979	Ana Rupert		Scottsdale		Top 12		
1978	Jacque Dawn Crutchfield	19	Phoenix				Died in an automobile accident on September 9, 2007.
1977	Toni Abranovic		Scottsdale		Top 12		
1976	Curvey Walters	23	Phoenix				
1975	Sanna Jo Osgood		Scottsdale				
1974	Carlys Peterson		Phoenix	Miss Phoenix	Top 12		Third runner-up at Miss Arizona USA 1973
1973	Sherry Nix	21	Carefree		3rd runner-up		Participated in Miss California USA 1973
1972	Marcia Banks		Tempe				
1971	Susanne Elizabeth "Susie" Pottenger		Tempe		2nd runner-up		Finalist at Miss Arizona USA 1970
1970	Alicia Ellen Lein	21	Mesa				
1969	Ruth Boykin Harris		Tempe	Miss Tempe	3rd Runner-Up		
1968	Shirley Diane Sprague		Avondale			Top 15 Best in Swimsuit	
1967	Judianne Magnusson	20	Phoenix	Miss Phoenix	Top 15		Died on December 27, 2015.
1966	Roxanne Neeley	20	Phoenix	Miss Phoenix	Top 15		Later Miss Arizona Wool 1966 (first runner-up at Miss Wool of America)
1965	Jane Nelson	20	Tempe	Miss Tempe	1st runner-up		Previously Miss New Mexico 1964, dethroned when she won the Miss Arizona USA title.
1964	Diane Louise Reutter	19	Phoenix	Miss Phoenix			
1963	Diane McGarry	20	Phoenix		Top 15		
1962	Marilyn Jerri Michelson	18	Scottsdale	Miss Yuma County	Top 15		
1961	Shyrle Owens Ortiz		Avondale				
1960	Virginia Lee Crook		Mesa				
1959	Patricia Varga		Mesa				
1958	Shirlee Dianne Fox		Avondale				Died in 2003.
1956	Maija Bertulson		Tucson				
1955	Patti Alexandria Marks	19	Glendale				
1954	Bonnie Johnson	18	Glendale				
1953	Eleanor Ruth Cross	19	Chandler				
1952	Charlene Hendricks	18	Tempe				
