= Jineane Ford =

American beauty queen and TV anchor

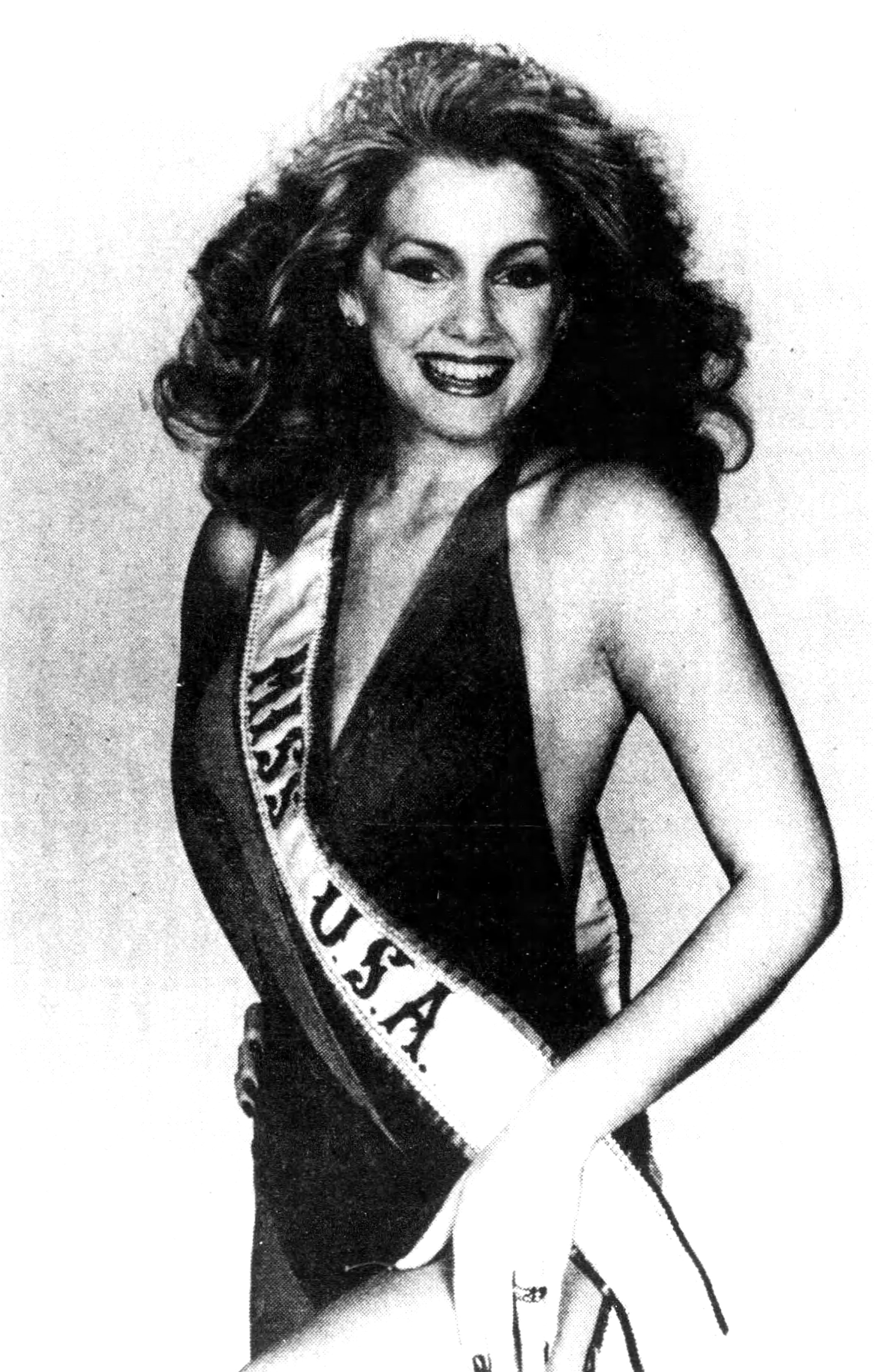
- Ford as Miss USA 1980
- Born: Jineane Marie Ford; 1960 (age 65–66)
- Spouse(s): Neil O. King; Clint Neff
- Children: 2
- Beauty pageant titleholder
- Title: Miss Arizona USA 1980; Miss USA 1980
- Hair color: Blonde
- Major competitions: Miss Arizona USA 1980; (Winner); Miss USA 1980; (1st Runner-Up) (Note: Ford was originally first runner-up, but became Miss USA after the original titleholder, Shawn Weatherly, won Miss Universe. Due to pageant protocol, Miss USA must relinquish her title in the event she wins Miss Universe.)

Jineane Marie Ford (born c. 1960) is an American actress, tv host and beauty pageant titleholder who was 1st Runner-Up at Miss USA 1980 and assumed the title after original winner Shawn Weatherly won Miss Universe 1980.

== Background ==
Ford was raised on a farm in Gilbert, Arizona. She raised calves, and participated in rodeo barrel racing. She was a member of the Future Farmers of America and became a registered meat cutter in high school.

== Pageants ==
Ford was named Fiesta Bowl Queen in 1978-79 when attending Mesa Community College before winning the Miss Arizona USA contest in 1980. She represented her state at the Miss USA pageant televised live from Biloxi, Mississippi in 1980.

Ford delivered a solid performance in the preliminary round of competition, and placed eighth among the top twelve semi-finalists who advanced to compete in the final night of the pageant. She was also the co-winner of the Miss Photogenic award.

Ford performed consistently during the pageant, placing among the top five in each of the interview, swimsuit and evening gown competitions: her strongest showing was in the evening gown competition where she ranked second. Overall, Ford finished first runner-up to Miss South Carolina USA Shawn Weatherly, which gave her the right to assume the Miss USA title should Weatherly be unable to complete her reign. In July 1980, Weatherly won the Miss Universe contest, and Ford was crowned the new Miss USA in her stead. As the two competitions are allied, the two American beauties completed their respective reigns living in the same apartment in New York, provided as part of their prize package.

== Acting career ==
After passing on her crown to Kim Seelbrede in 1981, Ford went on to work in the entertainment industry. While looking for acting work, she worked as a butcher at a Vons supermarket in Southern California. She obtained acting roles in several television series and movies.

== TV News ==
She then decided to return to Arizona and began a long career in local television, almost all in Phoenix except for several years in Tampa. She worked at KTVK and then joined KPNX-TV in Phoenix in 1991 where she co-anchored 12 News Today and 12 News Midday. She remained with the station until January 2, 2007, when she left anchoring full-time in order to spend more time with her family and to take care of her business.

=== Awards ===
In 2016, Ford was inducted into The Arizona Broadcasters Association Hall of Fame.

== Personal ==
She is also a business owner, having purchased the oldest log lodge in Arizona, restoring it and opening it again for business. She operates Mama Bear's Restaurant,and also Honey Bear Antiques and Lodge in Pinetop-Lakeside. Ford has won awards for Best New Business and Historic Preservation from the state. She has two sons, Cody and Austin, from her first marriage to Neil O. King.

== Television ==
Year	Title	Role	Notes
1982	Falcon Crest	Young Cordell Walker	
1982	The Dukes of Hazzard	The Girl	
1983	Laverne & Shirley	Terri	
1984	Remington Steele	Blonde	
1984	"Benson"	Tawny (Miss Downtown Retailers)	
1984	Chattanooga Choo Choo	Mary Lou	
1986	Riptide	Lisa	
