= Alyssa Cruz Aguero =

Guamanian beauty pageant titleholder (born 1988)

- Born: April 16, 1988 (age 38); Barrigada, Guam
- Height: 1.80 m (5 ft 11 in)
- Beauty pageant titleholder
- Title: Miss Guam 2012
- Hair color: Dark Brown
- Eye color: Brown
- Major competitions: Miss Guam 2012 (Winner); Miss Universe 2012

Alyssa Cruz Aguero (born April 16, 1988) is a Guamanian beauty pageant titleholder who was crowned Miss Guam 2012 and represented her country in the 2012 Miss Universe pageant.

== Career ==
=== Miss Guam 2012 ===
On August 31, 2012, Cruz Aguero won the 2012 Miss Universe Guam title at the Hyatt Regency in Tumon.

=== Miss Universe 2012 ===
On December 19, 2012, Cruz Aguero represented Guam and competed in the 2012 Miss Universe pageant that was held at PH Live at Planet Hollywood Resort & Casino, Las Vegas, Nevada, U.S. Cruz Aguero was not placed in the Top 16.

Awards and achievements
Preceded by Shayna Afaisen	Miss Guam; 2012	Succeeded by Alixes Scott
