= Miss Arizona Teen USA =

Beauty pageant competition

- Formation: 1983
- Type: Beauty pageant
- Headquarters: Phoenix
- Location: Arizona
- Members: Miss Teen USA
- Official language: English
- Key people: Sebastien Verstraet (Director and Executive Producer)
- Website: Official website

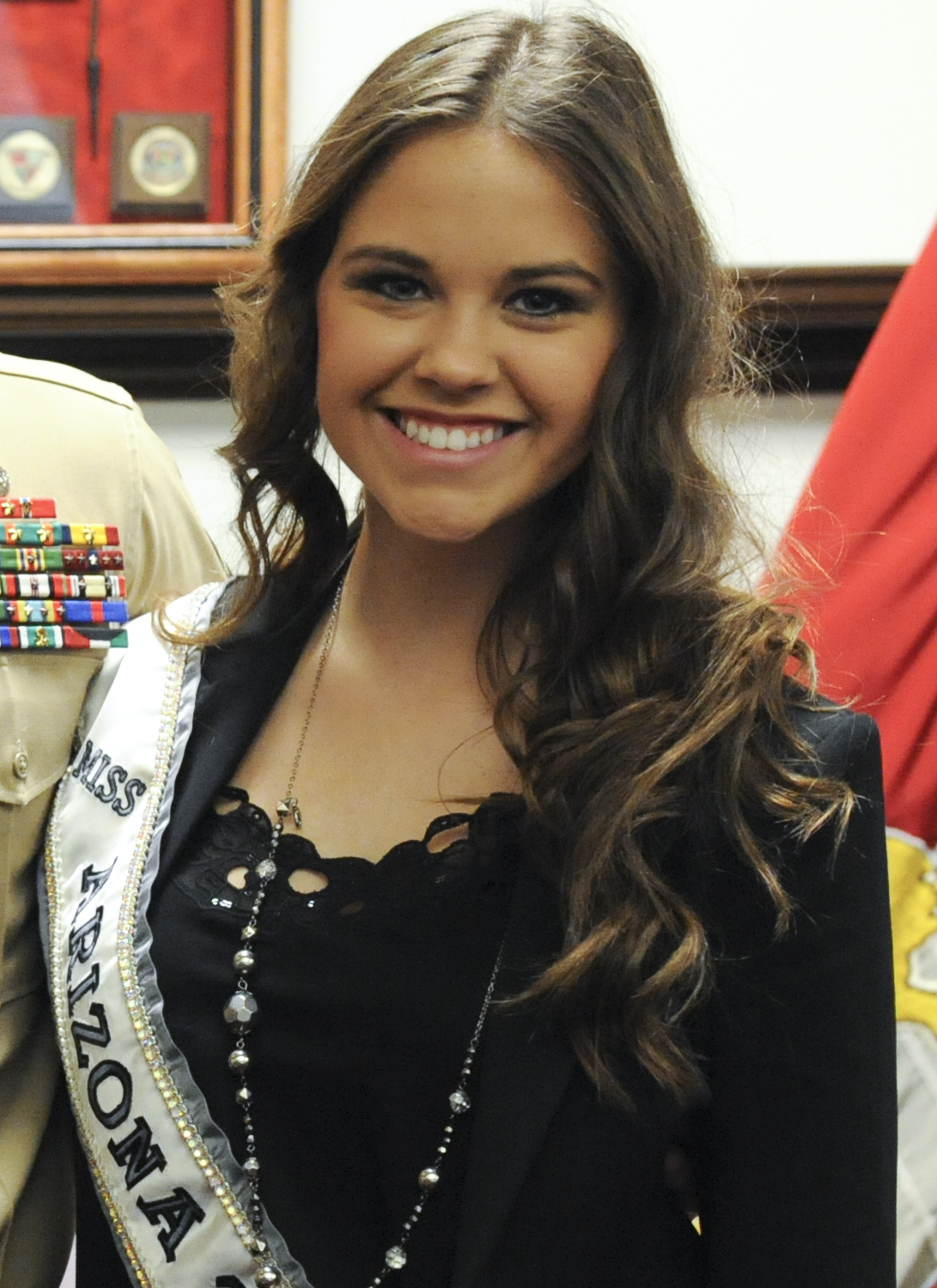
Alexa Zellars, Miss Arizona Teen USA 2012

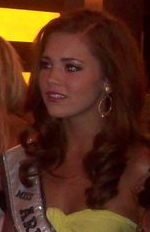
Ashley Stainton, Miss Arizona Teen USA 2008

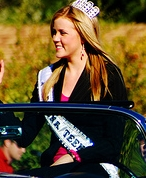
Tiffany Martin, Miss Arizona Teen USA 2007

The Miss Arizona Teen USA competition is the pageant that selects the representative for the state of Arizona in the Miss Teen USA pageant and the title held by that winner.

The first Arizona Teen to place at Miss Teen USA was Jeri-Lynn Beatty who made the top 12 in 1990. Three more Arizona teens have gone on to win the Miss Arizona USA title, including Danielle Demski, one of only two to place in the top five or six at Miss Teen USA. Demski later built a career as a television presenter.

The current Miss Arizona Teen USA is Ella Hansen of Tempe and was crowned at The Kimpton Miralina Resort & Villas in Scottsdale on June 13, 2026. Hansen represented Arizona at Miss Teen USA 2026.

== Miss Teen USA Placement Summary ==
=== Placements ===
- 2nd runner-up: Rachel McLaen (2024)
- Top 5/6: Courtney Hamilton (1996), Danielle Demski (1999)
- Top 10/12: Jeri-Lynn Beatty (1990), Emerald Zellers (2006), Eternity Valentine (2025)
- Top 15/16/20: Ashley Stainton (2008), Savannah Wix (2014), Neda Danilovic (2015), Karly Riggs (2017), Molly Schwanz (2020), MayaDenise Gaskin (2022), Ella Hansen (2026)

Arizona holds a record of 13 placements at Miss Teen USA.

=== Awards ===
- Best State Costume: Julie Hodges (1987)
- Miss Photogenic: Kristi Vanney (1986)

== Winners ==
- Declared as Winner
- Ended as runner-up
- Ended as one of the finalists or semifinalists

Year	Name	Hometown	Age^{1}	Local title	Placement at Miss Teen USA	Special awards at Miss Teen USA	Notes
2026	Ella Hansen	Tempe	19	Miss Sun Devil Teen	Top 20		
2025	Eternity Valentine	Maricopa	18	Miss Maricopa Teen	Top 10		
2024	Rachel Mclaen	Queen Creek	19	Miss Queen Creek Teen	2nd runner-up		
2023	Peyton Stuewe	Phoenix	18	Miss West Valley Teen			
2022	MayaDenise Gaskin	Phoenix	18	Miss Wildcat Teen	Top 16		Previously Miss Arizona Collegiate America 2021
2021	McKenzi Lindhag	Peoria	16	Miss Peoria Teen			
2020	Molly Schwanz	Scottsdale	18	Miss North Scottsdale Teen	Top 16		
2019	Jordan Waller	Phoenix	18	Miss Phoenix Teen			
2018	Macy Kathryn Deak	Phoenix	15	Miss DC Ranch Teen			
2017	Karlina "Karly" Riggs	Scottsdale	17	Miss Valley of the Sun Teen	Top 15		
2016	Tristany Hightower	Paradise Valley	16	Miss Paradise Valley Teen			
2015	Neda Danilovic	Phoenix	16	Miss Phoenix Teen	Top 15		
2014	Savannah Wix	Paradise Valley	17	Miss Paradise Valley Teen	Top 15		Later Miss Arizona USA 2019
2013	Olivia Argue	Paradise Valley	17	Miss Phoenix Teen			Sister of Molly Argue, Miss Arizona Teen USA 2011
2012	Alexa Zellers	Scottsdale	17	Miss Paradise Valley Teen			Sister of Emerald Zellers, Miss Arizona Teen USA 2006
2011	Molly Argue	Paradise Valley	18	Miss Paradise Valley Teen			Sister of Olivia Argue, Miss Arizona Teen USA 2013
2010	Tori Vance	Ahwatukee	17	Miss Ahwatukee Teen			
2009	Whitney Nelson	Ahwatukee	18	Miss Ahwatukee Teen			
2008	Ashley Stainton	Ahwatukee	17	Miss Foothills Teen	Top 15		
2007	Tiffany Martin	Phoenix	18	Miss Phoenix Teen			
2006	Emerald Zellers	Scottsdale	15		Top 10		Sister of Alexa Zellers, Miss Arizona Teen USA 2012
2005	Elisa Soto	Mesa	16				
2004	Allie Gilliland	Glendale	17				
2003	Natalia Benenson	Phoenix	18				
2002	Lynsie Ann Shackelford	Mesa	17				
2001	Eva Marie St. Arnauld	Mesa	18				
2000	Sarah Wilkins	Gilbert	18				
1999	Danielle Demski	Chandler	18		Top 5		Later Miss Arizona USA 2004; Top 15 at Miss USA 2004
1998	Kristy Kay Stover	Phoenix	18				
1997	Julie Gulbrandsen	Gilbert	18				
1996	Courtney Hamilton	Chandler	16		Top 6		
1995	Brandy Leigh Campbell	Tucson					
1994	Mistie Kline	Phoenix					
1993	Dannielle Normandin	Phoenix					
1992	Heather Keckler	Chandler	17				Later Miss Arizona USA 2000
1991	Christine Ciulla	Phoenix	17				
1990	Jeri-Lynn Beatty	Glendale	19		Top 12		
1989	Leann Elston	Tucson	17				Originally first runner-up, assumed title after auditing error resulted in Marketic incorrectly being named the winner
1989	Shannon LaRhea Marketic	Glendale	17		Did not compete; dethroned after a auditing error was corrected		Later Miss California USA 1992; Miss USA 1992
1988	Kristen Peterson	Tucson					
1987	Julie Hodges	Glendale	17			Best State Costume	
1986	Kristi Lynn Vanney	Tempe	16			Miss Photogenic	
1985	Vanessa Marie Steffens	Scottsdale	15				
1984	Shana Andrew	Mesa	17				
1983	Kris Lynn Keim	Scottsdale	17				Later Miss Arizona USA 1988

^{1} Age at the time of the Miss Teen USA pageant
