= Natalie Bode (reporter) =

American reporter (born 1999)

- Born: Natalie Bode; February 9, 1999 (age 27); Panama City, Florida, U.S.
- Education: UNC Chapel Hill
- Occupations: model; television presenter; sideline reporter
- Height: 5 ft 10.5 in (179.1 cm)
- Beauty pageant titleholder
- Title: Miss Nevada USA 2026
- Hair color: Brown
- Eye color: Brown
- Major competition: Miss USA 2026

Natalie Bode (born February 9, 1999) is an American reporter, tv host and beauty pageant titleholder who was crowned Miss Nevada USA 2026 and then represented Nevada at Miss USA 2026. She also works for the World Series of Poker, Celebrity Poker Tour and PokerGO.

== Early life and education ==
Bode was born in Panama City, Florida, and has two older sisters. She moved to Brenham, Texas when she was two years old.

After graduating from Brenham High School, Bode attended the University of Florida for a year before transferring to UNC Chapel Hill. Bode graduated in 2021 with a Bachelor of Arts in Media and Journalism from UNC Chapel Hill.

== Career ==
=== Pageantry ===
Bode began competing in beauty pageants in 2021. She placed in the Top 10 of the Miss North Carolina USA in 2021. After relocating to work for TNT Sports, Bode competed at Miss Georgia USA 2023, where she placed fourth runner-up and won Miss Congeniality.

After relocating to Nevada, Bode competed at Miss Nevada USA 2025, where she placed third runner-up. She competed at Miss Nevada USA 2026, where she won the Miss Nevada USA title.

In 2026, Bode represented Nevada at Miss USA 2026, where she place in the Top 10.

=== Sports journalist ===
Bode began her sports journalist career while attending UNC Chapel Hill. She was a student analyst for ACC Network Extra and created Tar Heel Talks, an interview series featuring UNC athletes and coaches.

She then joined Warner Brothers Discovery Sports' NCAA Digital team before joining Bleacher Report as a host and content creator.

Bode served as a weekend sports anchor and reporter at Hearts Television's KOAT in Albuquerque, New Mexico.

Currently, Bode is a sideline reporter for the Indoor Football League on Yahoo Sports. She was also nominated for Sideline Reporter of the Year at the 2026 IFL Broadcaster Awards.

Bode has also hosted New York Yankees segments, sponsored by DraftKings, for YES Network and Amazon Prime Video. She has also done other television broadcast work for ESPN+, ACC Network Extra, and TNT Sports.

=== Poker ===
Bode was hired by PokerGO in 2023 as a sideline reporter for the 2023 World Series of Poker. She would appear on PokerGO's broadcast that appeared on CBS Sports Network. Bode's role included interviews WSOP bracelet winners such as Chris Brewer, who won the $250,000 Super High Roller for $5,293,556 and his first WSOP bracelet.

Bode would also be part of the WSOP broadcast team in 2025 and 2026, along with other PokerGO shows including the PGT Championship and National Heads-Up Poker Championship.

In 2025, Bode joined the Celebrity Poker Tour team as a Host and Reporter.

In 2026, Bode was the sideline reporter for Season 10 of the National Heads-Up Poker Championship. The episodes premiered on Peacock in August, 2026.

== Personal life ==
Bode moved to Las Vegas, Nevada in March 2025.

Awards and achievements
Preceded by Mary Sickler	Miss Nevada USA; 2026	Incumbent
