= Brenham High School =

Public school in Texas, United States

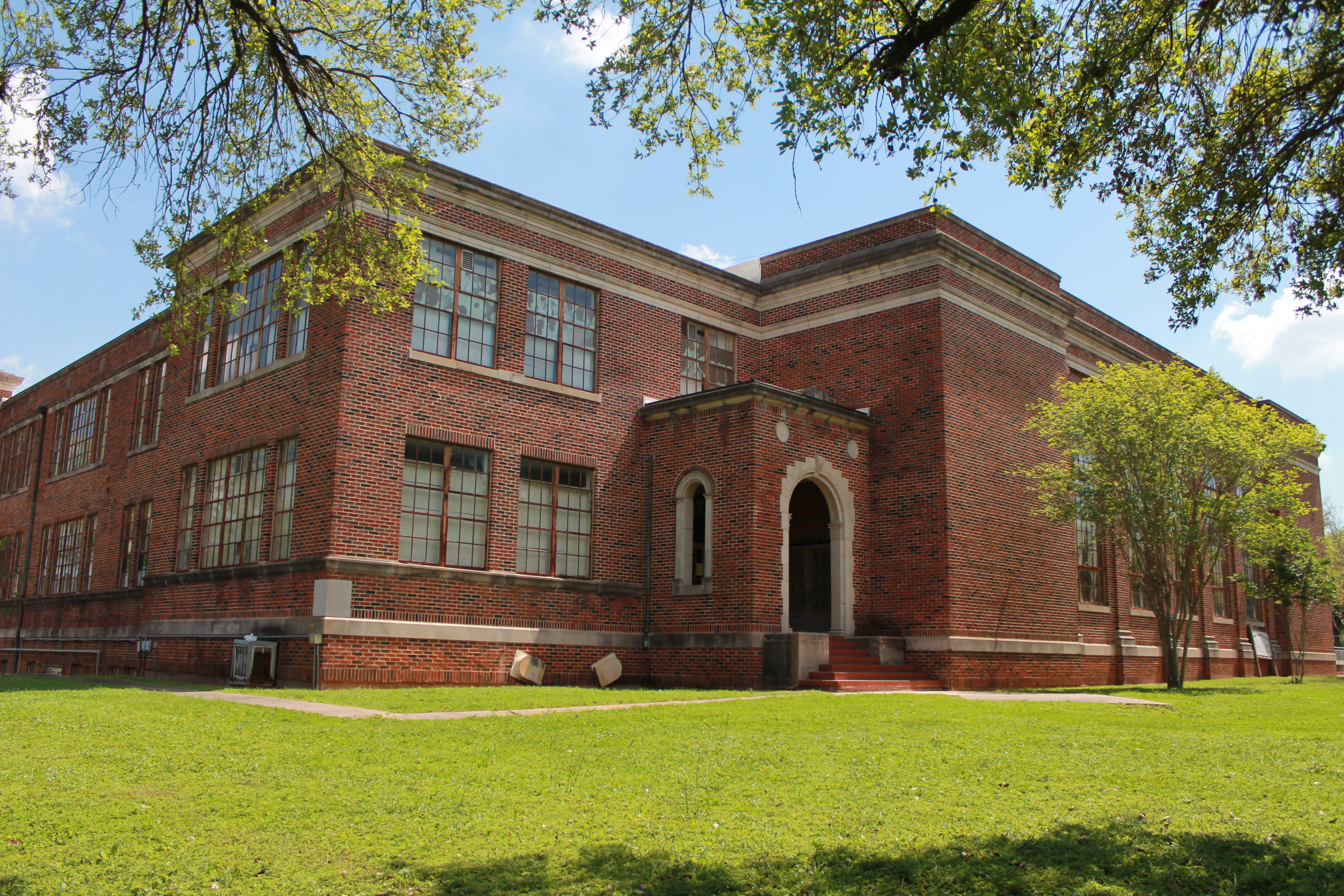
- Old Brenham High School

Location
- 525 A H Ehrig Dr. Brenham, Texas 77833-2487; United States; 30.1818°N 96.3963°W

Information
- School type: Public high school
- School district: Brenham Independent School District
- NCES District ID: 4811280
- CEEB code: 440835
- NCES School ID: 481128000604
- Principal: Michael Watts
- Teaching staff: 120.82 (on an FTE basis)
- Grades: 9-12
- Enrollment: 1,560 (2023-2024)
- Student to teacher ratio: 12.91
- Colors: Green and White
- Athletics conference: UIL Class 5A
- Mascot: Cubs/Cubettes
- Yearbook: Brenhamite
- Website: Official website

Brenham High School is a public high school located in the city of Brenham, Texas, United States. It is classified as a 5A school by the UIL. It is a part of the Brenham Independent School District located in central Washington County. In 2015, the school was rated "Met Standard" by the Texas Education Agency.

== Athletics ==
The Brenham Cubs compete in baseball, basketball, cross country, football, powerlifting, soccer, softball, swimming, tennis, track and field, and volleyball.

=== State titles ===
- Baseball
  - 1970 (3A), 1975 (3A), 1976 (3A), 1986 (4A), 1987 (4A), 1988 (4A), 2010 (4A)
- Girls' golf
  - 1983 (4A)
- Softball
  - 1996 (4A), 2005 (4A)
- Boys' track
  - 1952 (1A), 1953 (1A), 1977 (3A)
- Girls' track
  - 1979 (3A), 1980 (3A), 1987 (4A)

==== State Finalist ====
- Football
  - 2002 (4A/D2), 2009 (4A/D2), 2013 (4A/D2)

== Academics ==
=== Advanced Placement ===
Brenham High School offered the following College Board Advanced Placement courses in the 2024-2025 school year:

- AP 2-D Art and Design
- AP 3-D Art and Design
- AP Art History
- AP Biology
- AP Calculus AB
- AP Chemistry
- AP Computer Science A
- AP Computer Science Principles
- AP Drawing
- AP English Language and Composition
- AP English Literature and Composition
- AP Environmental Science
- AP Human Geography
- AP Macroeconomics
- AP Precalculus
- AP Psychology
- AP Seminar
- AP Spanish Language and Culture
- AP Statistics
- AP U.S. Government and Politics
- AP United States History
- AP World History: Modern

== Notable alumni ==
- Dane Acker (Class of 2017), professional baseball player
- Natalie Bode (Class of 2017), sports reporter and Miss Nevada USA 2026
- Malcom Brown (Class of 2012), professional football player
- Cecil Cooper (Class of 1967), professional baseball player
- Lois Kolkhorst (Class of 1982), state politician, state representative from Brenham from 2001-2015, and state senator since 2015
- Roosevelt Leaks (Class of 1971), professional football player
- Chuck Machemehl (Class of 1964), professional baseball player
- Frank Malina (Class of 1930), aeronautical engineer, rocket researcher, artist
- Teaira McCowan (Class of 2015), WNBA player
- Gus Franklin Mutscher (Class of 1950), state politician, former Speaker of the Texas House of Representatives (1969-1972)
- Joe Routt, professional football player, Bronze Star Medal recipient, posthumous hall of fame inductee (College Texas Sports: 1952, National Football: 1962)
- Ricky Seilheimer (Class of 1978), professional baseball player
- Courtland Sutton (Class of 2014), professional football player
- Limas Sweed (Class of 2003), professional football player
- Wilson Whitley (Class of 1973), professional football player
