= Katie Rees =

Dethroned winner of Miss Nevada USA 2007

- Born: Katherine Nicole Rees; August 11, 1984 (age 42); St. Petersburg, Florida, U.S.
- Height: 5 ft 8 in (1.73 m)
- Beauty pageant titleholder
- Title: Miss Nevada USA 2007 (Dethroned)
- Hair color: Blonde
- Eye color: Blue
- Major competitions: Miss Nevada USA 2007 (Winner; dethroned)

Katherine Nicole Rees (born August 11, 1984) is an American former beauty pageant titleholder who was crowned Miss Nevada USA 2007. She was to compete in the Miss USA 2007 pageant, but was dethroned in December 2006 following the release of sexually charged pictures of her taken at a Florida nightclub three years prior.

== Miss Nevada USA ==
Rees won the title of Miss Nevada USA 2007 on her first try in a state pageant held in Las Vegas on October 8, 2006. She was crowned by outgoing titleholder Lauren Scyphers. Her "sister" titleholder, Miss Nevada Teen USA 2007, was Danielle Hashimoto.

== Pageant scandal ==
On December 20, 2006, allegations of Rees exhibiting lewd behaviour in a Florida nightclub, three years prior while away at college, were made, and several photographs of Rees, kissing other women, and simulating sexual acts were released to the media. This followed a scandal involving Miss USA 2006 Tara Conner, in which news reports claimed Conner had been drinking underage, using illegal substances and photos of her kissing Miss Teen USA; Conner was sent to rehab and allowed to retain her title.

On December 21, 2006, Rees was stripped of her crown by the Miss Universe Organization with the approval of pageant co-owner Donald Trump. She was succeeded by pageant first runner-up Helen Salas, who represented Nevada in the Miss USA 2007 pageant in March placing in the final five.

== Life after Miss Nevada USA ==
On January 27, 2007, Celebrity Web Site TMZ.com published one of the sets of photos that got Rees in trouble with the Miss Universe Organization.

In January 2007, Rees signed a two-year, $2 million-plus deal to host a revival of a bawdy “estrogen-heavy” variety show at the Hard Rock Hotel and Casino in Las Vegas. Her agent said had rejected other offers to appear in a Girls Gone Wild adult video and pose for Playboy magazine.

On August 6, 2007, Rees appeared on the television show Dr. Phil on an episode entitled "Caught in the Act."

On February 6, 2008, Rees was arrested for resisting arrest after allegedly assaulting a police officer after a traffic stop at 3:00 a.m. in Las Vegas. Rees was charged with speeding, driving with a suspended license, operating a motor vehicle with suspended license plates, failure to produce proof of insurance and resisting a police officer. In April 2008, she agreed to pay fines for five misdemeanor traffic violations in exchange for prosecutors dropping a charge of resisting arrest.

On September 20, 2009, Rees featured on the Australian television show, Border Security: Australia's Front Line. During the programme, she was shown being questioned by Customs Officers at Sydney airport after swabs of her bag and laptop gave positive readings for cocaine and/or methamphetamine, and she was unable to give the full name of her traveling companion/friend. No drugs were found and the officers were able to verify the story with her traveling companion/friend. She was later cleared to enter the country. In describing the event, the Customs officer stated that they, "went and spoke to [Rees'] travelling companion. Their stories were similar, but not textbook rehearsed, so what she was saying added up. Even though - to me - it seemed bizarre, the world's a funny place. People do unusual things and that doesn't always mean they're drug couriers, but it was certainly something that had to be investigated thoroughly. And we did and she's gone now, on her way". Speaking to the camera crew outside in the arrivals hall, Rees said "I think I almost just peed my pants, to be honest with you. I'm shocked! I'm from Las Vegas, so you never know what the heck's going to be around out there! And thank gosh I don't have anything on me because I don't do any sort of illegal activity - but Las Vegas apparently does".

On September 22, 2014, Rees was caught selling methamphetamine and a month later she was found with 5.3 grams of methamphetamine in her possession.

On June 8, 2015, a warrant was issued for her arrest. Rees was charged with four felonies. They include trafficking in a controlled substance, sale of a controlled substance, and two counts of conspiracy to violate the uniform controlled substances act. The criminal complaint filed stated that she conspired with "unknown co-conspirators."

Rees was arrested again Sept. 1, 2015 after her boyfriend of 10-months, Kevin “DJ Kulprit” Sims, was pulled over by Las Vegas Police for allegedly speeding and failing to signal when changing lanes. Rees was charged with five drug counts, including felony possession of methamphetamine. Officers found rolling papers, two smoking pipes and a canister containing what police believed to be marijuana in a bag that she said was hers. They also found Xanax and Oxycontin as well as a substance that tested positive for meth.

In February 2016, Rees avoided jail time for the four felony drug charges and was put on probation not to exceed three years. She had been sentenced to 12 to 32 months in jail but the sentence was suspended.

Awards and achievements
Preceded by Lauren Scyphers	Miss Nevada USA; 2007 (dethroned)	Succeeded by Helen Salas
