= Danielle Demski =

American television presenter (born 1981)

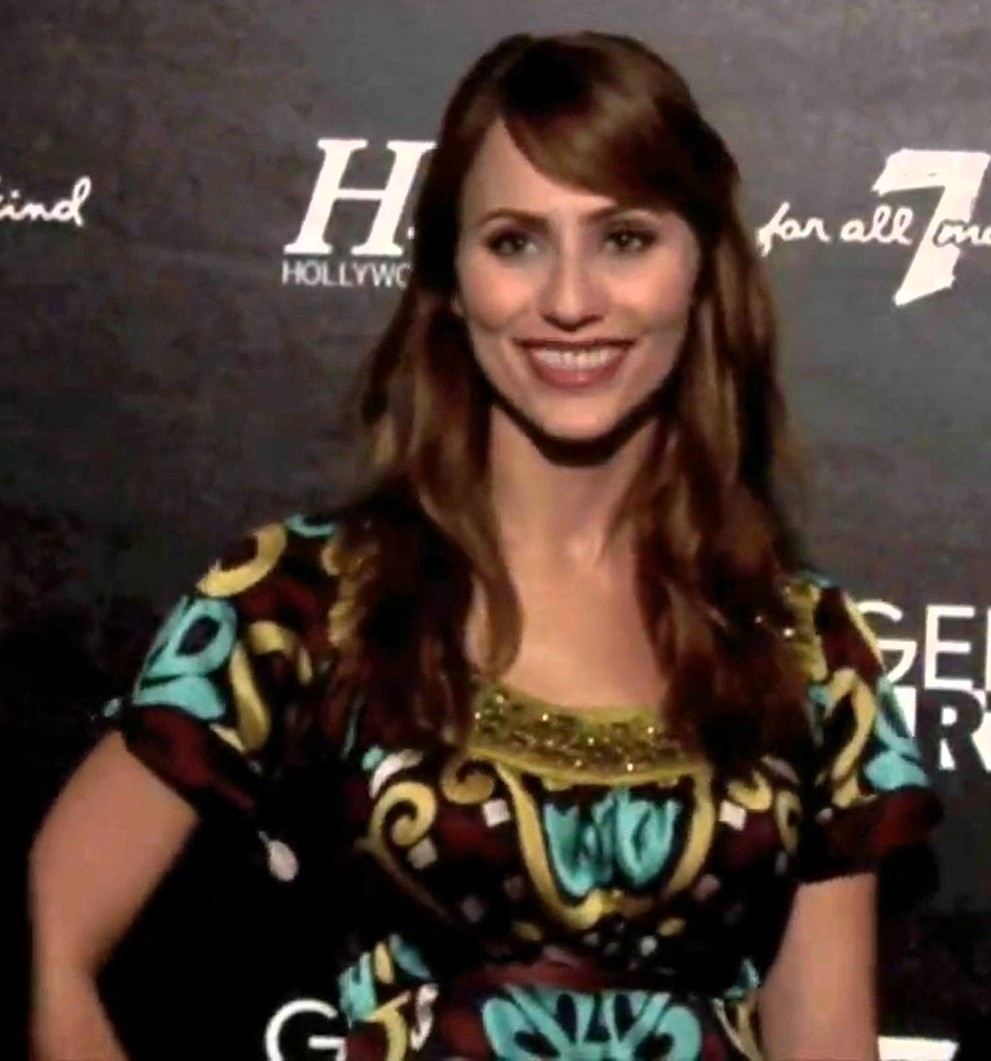
- Demski in 2009
- Born: Chandler, Arizona, U.S.
- Occupations: Actress; Model
- Beauty pageant titleholder
- Title: Miss Arizona Teen USA 1999; Miss Arizona USA 2004
- Years active: 1999–present
- Major competitions: Miss Teen USA 1999 (3rd runner-up); Miss USA 2004 (Top 15)
- Website: www.danielledemski.com/web/

Danielle Demski is an American television presenter, actress, and beauty pageant titleholder, who competed in Miss Teen USA and Miss USA.

== Pageantry ==
Demski won her first pageant, Miss Arizona Teen USA 1999 in 1998. She competed in Miss Teen USA 1999, held in Shreveport, Louisiana, in August 1999, where she became the third delegate from Arizona to make the semi-finals. Demski was sixth in the interview competition, sixth in swimsuit, and third in evening gown, and entered the top six in fourth place. She retained fourth position following the final question, and was placed third runner-up overall.

In 2003 Demski won Miss Arizona USA 2004, becoming the third Miss Arizona Teen USA to win the Miss Arizona USA title. She represented Arizona at Miss USA 2004, at the Kodak Theatre, Hollywood, California, on April 11, 2004.

== TV & Film ==
In 2009 Demski worked as a correspondent for the World Series of Poker held at the Rio in Las Vegas, NV. She also hosted The Vegas Minute, a weekly video segment which aired on KTLA in Los Angeles, California.

In 2013 Demski was the backup model for Let's Make a Deal, first appearing during Season 5 of the Wayne Brady-hosted version in 2013 when Tiffany Coyne left early in the season to take maternity leave. She continues as the backup, most recently during Season 11 in 2019, when Coyne was unavailable. In 2014 she appeared on an episode of The Young and the Restless. Additionally, Demski made a few appearances on The Price Is Right.

Demski was a cheerleader for the Arizona Cardinals of the National Football League for four years.

| Preceded by Nafeesa DeFlorias | Miss Arizona USA; 2004 | Succeeded by Mariana Loya |
