= Athena McNinch =

Guamanian model and beauty pageant titleholder

Athena Eva Su McNinch
- Born: 28 December 1997 (age 28); Mangilao, Guam
- Education: University of Guam
- Height: 1.70 m (5 ft 7 in)
- Beauty pageant titleholder
- Title: Miss Universe Guam 2018
- Hair color: Dark Brown
- Eye color: Dark Brown
- Major competitions: Face of Beauty International 2014 (Unplaced); Miss World Guam 2015 (Unplaced); Miss Universe Guam 2018 (Winner); Miss Universe 2018 (Unplaced); Miss International 2019 (Unplaced)

Athena Eva Su McNinch (born December 28, 1997) is a Guamanian model and beauty pageant titleholder who was Miss Universe Guam 2018, and represented Guam at the Miss International 2019 in Tokyo, Japan.

== Early life and education ==
Athena has lived her entire life in Mangilao, Guam, the village where the University of Guam is located. Her mother is from Kaohsiung, Taiwan and is Chinese-Polynesian. Her father is Irish, Norwegian and English. In high school, Athena worked as a camp aide for 5-7 year olds at the University of Guam Summer Camp. Miss Guam Ambassador for the Guam Visitor's Bureau. She is currently a graduate teaching assistant for former Governor Ansito Walter at the University of Guam. Athena speaks English and Mandarin Chinese.

In 2017, she was named a Harry S. Truman Scholar, followed by earning the US Congressional Award Gold Medal in 2018. Athena is an active member of the Alpha Phi Sigma, Blue Key Honors Society, and Golden Key International Honors Society.

== Pageantry ==
Athena was named to serve as the Guam representative to the Miss International pageant in April 2019. This event was held in Tokyo, Japan in November 2019.

Athena was crowned the Miss Universe Guam 2018 by 2017 Miss Universe Guam, Myana Welch, at the Guam Sheraton. She represented Guam in Bangkok, Thailand in December 2018.

In the 2018 Miss Universe Guam Pageant, Athena was named best in evening gown and best in swimsuit. In 2015, Athena was named First Runner Up and Miss Photogenic in the Miss World Guam Pageant.

Awards and achievements
Preceded by Myana Welch	Miss Universe Guam; 2018	Succeeded by Sissie Luo
