= Miss Nevada Teen USA =

Beauty pageant competition

- Formation: 1983; 43 years ago
- Type: Beauty pageant
- Headquarters: Las Vegas
- Location: Nevada
- Members: Miss Teen USA
- Official language: English
- Key people: Shanna Moakler (executive director)
- Website: Website

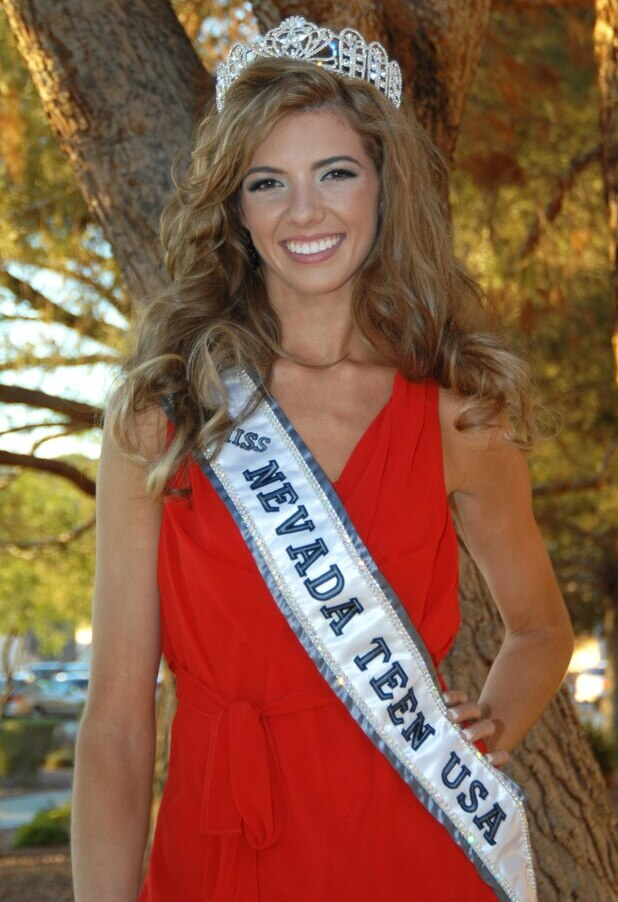
Ashley Brown, Miss Nevada Teen USA 2011

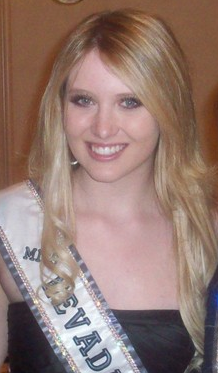
Lauren Hudman, Miss Nevada Teen USA 2008

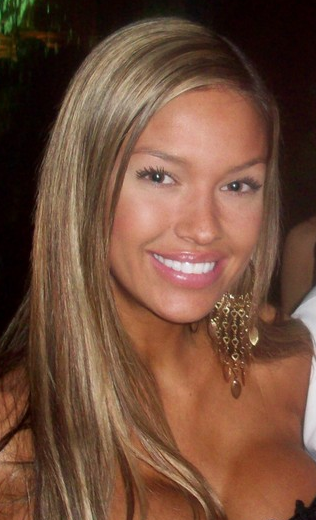
Helen Salas, Miss Nevada Teen USA 2004

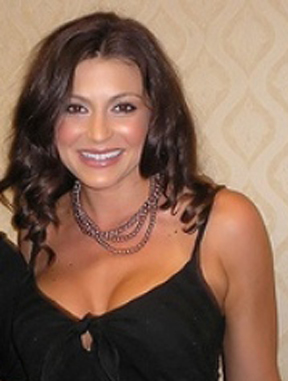
Cerina Vincent, Miss Nevada Teen USA 1996

The Miss Nevada Teen USA competition is the pageant that selects the representative for the state of Nevada in the Miss Teen USA pageant.

Contestants compete in interview, active wear, and evening gown. Winners have most commonly come from Las Vegas since the pageant began in 1983.

Ashley Salgado of Las Vegas was crowned Miss Nevada Teen USA 2026 on June 18, 2026, at Westgate Las Vegas Resort & Casino in Las Vegas. She will represent Nevada at Miss Teen USA 2026.

== Results summary ==
=== Placements ===
- 2nd runners-up: Victoria Franklin (1998), Helen Salas (2004), Alexis Smith (2017), Erica Bonilla (2019)
- 4th runner-up: Carissa Morrow (2016)
- Top 10: Kimberly Cannon (1983), Kristen Walthers (1999), Cameron Reese (2025)
- Top 15/16: Ileri Tunrarebi (2009), Britney Barnhart (2018), Janae McIntosh (2022)

Nevada holds a record of 11 placements at Miss Teen USA.

=== Awards ===
- Miss Congeniality: Janae McIntosh (2022)
- Miss Photogenic: JJ Casper (1990)

== Winners ==
Year	Name	Hometown	Age	Local title	Placement at Miss Teen USA	Special awards	Notes
2026	Ashley Salgado	North Las Vegas	18	Miss North Las Vegas Teen			
2025	Cameron Reese	Las Vegas	18	Miss Las Vegas Teen	Top 10		
2024	Courtney Clark	Las Vegas	18	Miss Area 51 Teen			
2023	Emily Cox	Las Vegas	18	Miss Silver State Teen			
2022	Janae McIntosh	Las Vegas	19	Miss Silver State Teen	Top 16	Miss Congeniality	
2021	Noelani Mendoza	Las Vegas	18	Miss Red Rock Teen			
2020	Montana Cencarik	Las Vegas	18	Miss Las Vegas Teen			
2019	Erica Bonilla	Las Vegas	18	Miss Tivoli Teen	2nd runner-up		
2018	Britney Barnhart	Las Vegas	16	Miss Las Vegas Teen	Top 15		Sister of Miss Nevada Teen USA 2008 Lauren Hudman and daughter of Jill Liebmann Miss Oklahoma USA 1982
2017	Alexis Smith	Las Vegas	16	Miss Summerlin Teen	2nd runner-up		
2016	Carissa Morrow	Henderson	18	Miss Seven Hills Teen	4th runner-up		
2015	Geovanna Hilton	Las Vegas	18	Miss Clark County Teen			
2014	Alexa Taylor	Las Vegas	15	Miss Summerlin Teen			
2013	Amanda Jenkins	Reno	18	Miss Sparks Teen			
2012	Katie Eklund	Las Vegas	19	Miss Las Vegas Teen			
2011	Ashley Brown	Las Vegas	18	Miss Nellis AFB Teen			
2010	Audrey Denison	Las Vegas	17	Miss Green Valley Teen			Later converted to Mormonism and served mission for the LDS Church
2009	Ileri Tunrarebi	Henderson	19	Miss Henderson Teen	Top 15		Cheerleader for the San Francisco 49ers
2008	Lauren Hudman	Henderson	18	Miss Henderson Teen			Daughter of Jill Barnhart (Miss Oklahoma USA 1982) and sister of Miss Nevada Teen USA 2018 Britney Barnhart
2007	Danielle Hashimoto	Reno	16				Miss Nevada Junior Teen 2004
2006	Georgina Vaughan	Las Vegas	18				Later Miss Nevada USA 2009
2005	Kelli Crossley	Las Vegas	17				
2004	Helen Salas	Las Vegas	18	2nd runner-up			1st runner-up at Miss Nevada USA 2007, later assumed the title after the original winner Katie Rees disqualified due to controversial past, 4th runner up at Miss USA 2007
2003	Ashley Phelps	Las Vegas	15				
2002	Kathryn Bigler	Las Vegas	18				
2001	Tahnee Harrison						
2000	Melissa Davis	Las Vegas	18				
1999	Kristen Walthers	Las Vegas	16		Semi-finalist		
1998	Victoria Franklin	Las Vegas	14		2nd runner-up		Later Miss Nevada USA 2004
1997	Kaci Renee Thompson	Las Vegas	18				
1996	Cerina Vincent	Las Vegas	18				Actress, has appeared in Not Another Teen Movie, Cabin Fever and Power Rangers: Lost Galaxy
1995	Alicia Denyse Carnes	Las Vegas	18				Later Miss Nevada USA 2000
1994	Heather Kittrel	Las Vegas	15				
1993	Tammie Rankin	Las Vegas	16				Later Miss Nevada USA 1998
1992	Jennifer Gassmann	Las Vegas	18				
1991	Brooke Hammond	Las Vegas	19				Later Miss Nevada USA 1995
1990	JJ Casper	Las Vegas	19			Miss Photogenic	
1989	Stacey L Bentley	Las Vegas	19				
1988	Erin Abernathy	Las Vegas	19				
1987	Terri Broca	Las Vegas	19				
1986	Wendy Stewart	Las Vegas	15				
1985	Leslye Peterson	Las Vegas	16				
1984	Rana Kirkland	Las Vegas	17				
1983	Kimberly Cannon	Las Vegas	18		Semi-finalist		

== See also ==
- Miss Nevada USA
- Miss Nevada
