= Miss Teen USA 1999 =

17th edition of the Miss Teen USA competition

- Date: August 24, 1999
- Presenters: Carson Daly; Ali Landry; Julie Moran
- Entertainment: Britney Spears; N'Sync
- Venue: Hirsch Memorial Coliseum, Louisiana
- Broadcaster: CBS; KSLA
- Winner: Ashley Coleman; Delaware
- Congeniality: Morgan Maholich; New York
- Photogenic: Lexie Kemper; Kentucky

Miss Teen USA 1999, the 17th Miss Teen USA pageant, was televised live from Shreveport, Louisiana on 24 August 1999. At the conclusion of the final competition, Ashley Coleman of Delaware was crowned by outgoing queen Vanessa Minnillo of South Carolina. Coleman was the first national titleholder from Delaware.

== Background ==
This was the second year that the pageant was held in Shreveport. The pageant's return to the Shreveport-Bossier City area was announced by Miss Teen USA 1998 Vanessa Minillo and pageant owner Donald Trump in February 1999.

In the lead up to the final competition the contestants participated in a number of sight-seeing opportunities and events, filming segments with Britney Spears that appeared in the final telecast.

The preliminary competition was held on 20 July 1999, with all contestants competing in swimsuit and gown to determine the makeup of the semi-finalists who competed in the final telecast.

== Hosts and entertainment ==
The pageant was hosted by newcomer Carson Daly with color commentary by Ali Landry and Julie Moran for the second year. Landry held the Miss Louisiana Teen USA 1990, Miss Louisiana USA 1996 and Miss USA 1996 titles.

During the pageant there were performances by Britney Spears and N'Sync. This was the second year that N'Sync provided entertainment.

== Judges ==
Eight celebrity judges were selected to determine the winner of the pageant:

- Coolio – American rapper
- Kimberly Kirberger – co-author of two Chicken Soup for the Soul books
- Eric Lively – actor known for appearances in So Weird and American Pie
- Colin Mortensen - cast member on The Real World: Hawaii
- Jeanie Pyun – Deputy Editor of Mademoiselle magazine
- DeeDee Roper – member of the hip-hop group Salt-N-Pepa
- Dave Tomberlin – Director of Television and Special Projects for Interscope Geffen A&M Records
- Tisha Venturini – member of the 1999 FIFA Women's World Cup winning United States women's national soccer team

== Results ==
=== Placements ===
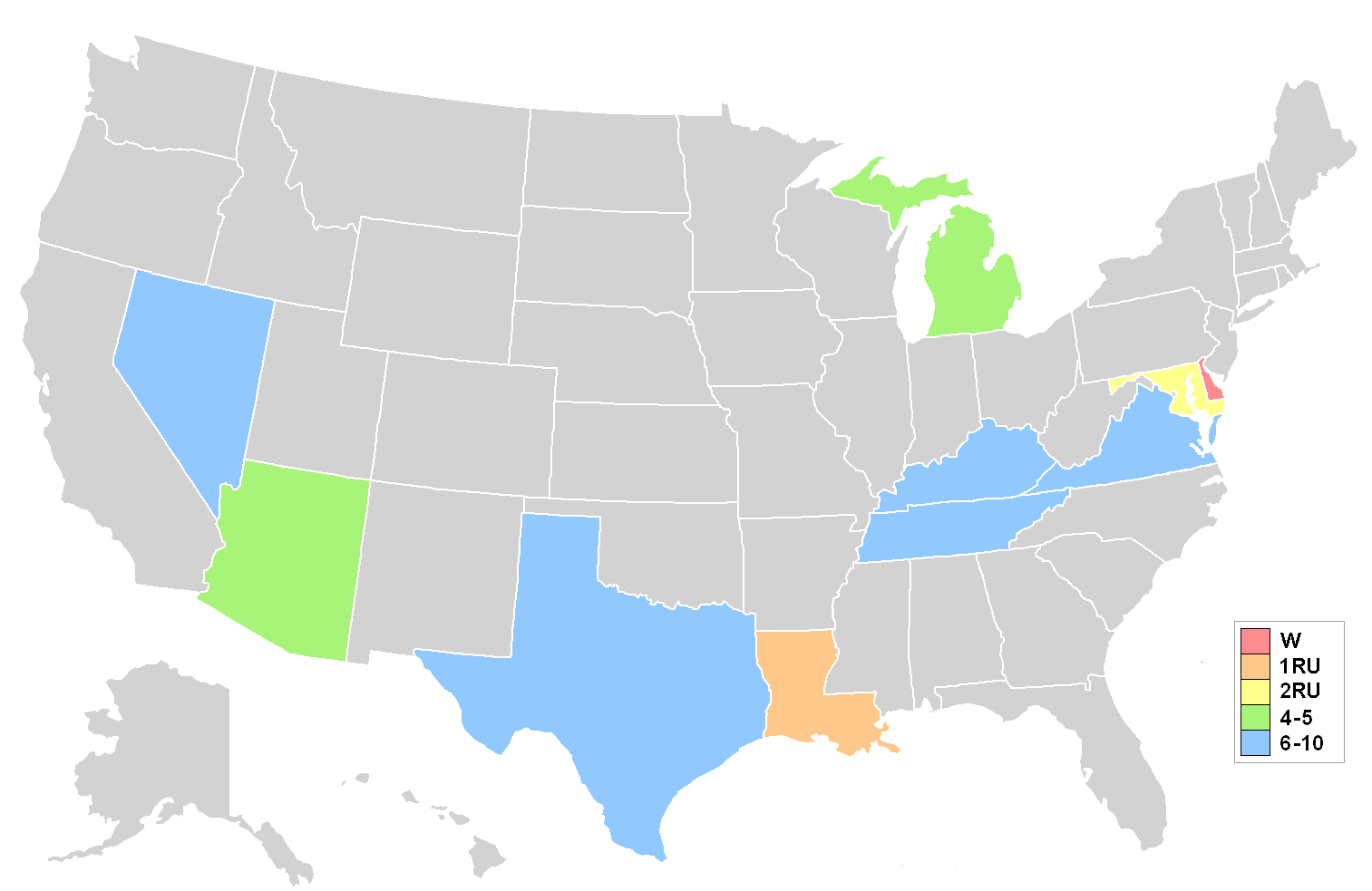
Map showing placements by state

Ashley Coleman was chosen from three finalists, with Louisiana's Sarah Thornhill finishing first runner-up and Khosi Roy of Maryland placing second runner-up. There were two other finalists and five semi-finalists.

Final results	Contestant
Miss Teen USA 1999	Delaware – Ashley Coleman
1st Runner-Up	Louisiana – Sarah Thornhill
2nd Runner-Up	Maryland – Khosi Roy
Top 5	Arizona – Danielle Demski; Michigan – Sara Dusendang
Top 10	Kentucky – Lexie Kemper; Nevada – Kristen Walthers; Tennessee – Rachel Boston; Texas – Misty Giles; Virginia – Kristi Lauren Glakas

=== Special awards ===
- Miss Congeniality: Morgan Maholich (New York)
- Miss Photogenic: Lexie Kemper (Kentucky)
- Style Award: Morgan O'Murray (Colorado)
- Best in Swimsuit: Ashley Coleman (Delaware)
- Best in Evening Gown: Ashley Coleman (Delaware)

=== Final Competition Score ===
State	Interview	Swimsuit	Evening Gown	Semifinal Average	Top 5 Question
Delaware	9.73 (2)	9.65 (1)	9.77 (1)	9.71 (1)	9.78 (1)
Louisiana	9.32 (5)	9.51 (3)	9.50 (5)	9.44 (5)	9.54 (3)
Maryland	9.76 (1)	9.58 (2)	9.47 (6)	9.60 (2)	9.61 (2)
Arizona	9.22 (6)	9.45 (6)	9.68 (3)	9.45 (4)	9.36 (4)
Michigan	9.57 (3)	9.46 (5)	9.73 (2)	9.58 (3)	9.16 (5)
Kentucky	9.44 (4)	9.28 (9)	9.58 (4)	9.43 (6)	
Texas	9.17 (7)	9.48 (4)	9.45 (8)	9.36 (7)	
Tennessee	8.96 (10)	9.39 (7)	9.45 (7)	9.26 (8)	
Virginia	9.06 (9)	9.36 (8)	9.34 (10)	9.25 (9)	
Nevada	9.09 (8)	9.21 (10)	9.41 (9)	9.23 (10)	

Winner
First Runner-up
Second Runner-up
Top 5 Finalist
Top 10 Semifinalist
(#) Rank in each round of competition

== Delegates ==
The Miss Teen USA 1999 delegates were:

- Alabama - Starla Smith
- Alaska - Kjersti Marie Parker
- Arizona - Danielle Demski
- Arkansas - Sarah Moody
- California - Marianne Kennedy
- Colorado - Morgan O'Murray
- Connecticut - Bethany McGlynn
- Delaware - Ashley Coleman
- (Washington, D.C.) District of Columbia - Shelby Braxton-Brooks
- Florida - Michelle Schmotzer
- (Georgia (U.S. state)) Georgia - Keely Wright
- Hawaii - Aureana Tseu
- Idaho - Kimberly Weible
- Illinois - Amber Dusak
- Indiana - Jennifer Phillips
- Iowa - Teresa Moberg
- Kansas - Grace Shibley
- Kentucky - Lexie Kemper
- Louisiana - Sarah Thornhill
- Maine - Michelle Beaulieu
- Maryland - Khosi Roy
- Massachusetts - Jill Lynne Donahue
- Michigan - Sara Marie Dusendang
- Minnesota - Laura Beth Reier
- Mississippi - Allison Bloodworth
- Missouri - Andrea Camile Elliott
- Montana - Raylene Miller
- Nebraska - Kiley Kempcke
- Nevada - Kristen Walters
- New Hampshire - Kristen Thurston
- New Jersey - Nicole Marie Golas
- New Mexico - Alina Ogle
- (New York (state)) New York - Morgan Maholich
- North Carolina - Stephanie Holt
- North Dakota - Natalie Larson
- Ohio - Erika Moody
- Oklahoma - Ashley Bowen
- Oregon - Tracy Hackenmiller
- Pennsylvania - Christina Cindrich
- Rhode Island - Jodi Fournier
- South Carolina - Hannah Grooms
- South Dakota - Alexia Marie Bonte
- Tennessee - Rachel Boston
- Texas - Misty Giles
- Utah - Laurissa Solomon
- Vermont - Jennifer Ripley
- Virginia - Kristi Lauren Glakas
- (Washington (state)) Washington - Dianna Carlson
- West Virginia - Carrie Anne Fleshman
- Wisconsin - Deanndra Diane Deblack
- Wyoming - Katie Rudoff

== Contestant notes ==
- Miss Virginia Teen USA 1999 Kristi Lauren Glakas later won the Miss Virginia USA 2004 and Miss Virginia 2005 titles. She was unplaced at Miss USA 2004 and won a preliminary swimsuit award and placed third runner-up at Miss America 2006.
- Morgan O'Murray of Colorado later won the Miss Colorado 2002 title and competed at Miss America.
- Jane Kim won the title of Miss Georgia Teen USA 1999, but was disqualified in after it was discovered she was not a US citizen, but had been born in South Korea. Her first runner-up, Keely Wright, represented Georgia in her place.
- Miss Texas Teen USA 1999 Misty Giles went on to appear on Survivor: Panama.
