= Brittany Bell =

American beauty pageant winner

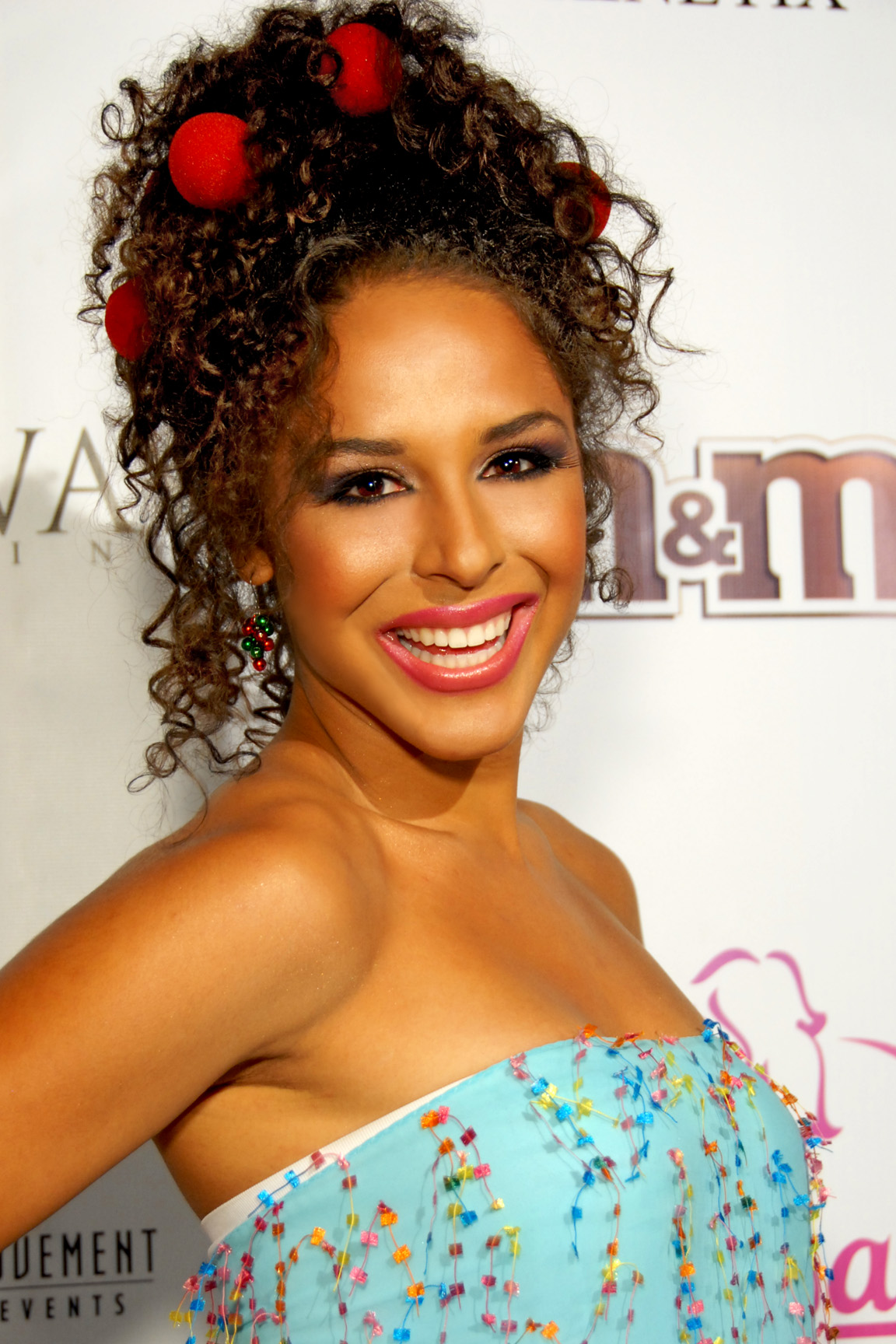
- Bell in 2010
- Born: Brittany Mesa Bell; November 9, 1987 (age 38); Barrigada, Guam, U.S.
- Education: Arizona State University
- Children: 3
- Beauty pageant titleholder
- Title: Miss Arizona USA 2010; Miss Guam 2014
- Hair color: Brown
- Eye color: Brown
- Major competitions: Miss USA 2010 (unplaced); Miss Guam 2014 (winner); Miss Universe 2014 (unplaced)

Brittany Mesa Bell (born November 9, 1987) is an American model, dancer, and beauty pageant titleholder who was crowned Miss Guam 2014 and represented Guam at Miss Universe 2014, where she was unplaced. She had previously been crowned Miss Arizona USA 2010 and represented Arizona in Miss USA 2010.

== Early life ==
Bell was born and raised in Barrigada, Guam, to a Chamorro mother and a father of Native American, West Indian and African American heritage.

== Career ==
In 2009, she was crowned Miss Arizona USA 2010, as well as Miss Congeniality, As Miss Arizona, she went on to compete in the Miss USA 2010 but did not advance beyond the opening round at the pageant held in Las Vegas, Nevada, on May 16, 2010.

Bell spent three seasons as an NBA cheerleader, working for the Phoenix Suns. She graduated from Arizona State University in 2009 with a bachelor's degree in broadcast journalism.

Bell was crowned Miss Guam Universe 2014 and competed against others at Miss Universe 2014.

== Personal life ==
She has given birth to three of actor Nick Cannon's 12 children, born in 2017, 2020, and 2022.

Awards and achievements
Preceded by Alixes Scott	Miss Guam; 2014	Succeeded by Muñeka Taisipic
Preceded by Alicia-Monique Blanco	Miss Arizona USA; 2010	Succeeded by Brittany Dawn Brannon
