= Miss Guam =

Beauty contest

- Type: Women's beauty pageant
- Headquarters: Hagåtña
- Territory represented: Guam
- Qualifies for: Miss Universe; Miss International
- First edition: 1966
- Most recent edition: 2019
- Current titleholder: Sissie Luo; Tamuning
- President: Joyce Bamba
- Language: English
- Website: missguamuniverse.com

Miss Guam is a national beauty pageant in Guam.

== History ==
=== 1965–2000 ===
Miss Guam was founded in 1965 by the Guam Beauty Organization to spread the håfa adai spirit, promote and showcase Guamanian culture. In early Miss Guam selected the winner to Miss Universe. Since 2008, the winner represents Guam at the Miss Universe pageant and additionally Guam returned to Miss International and from Miss Guam org. a runner-up represents Guam at the Miss International pageant.

=== 2008–2019 ===
In 2008, Miss Guam was renamed as Miss Universe Guam to choose representatives for the Miss Universe and Miss International pageants. Since that year, Miss Universe Guam has two official licenses for the island. Meanwhile, the representative for Miss World is selected by Miss World Guam pageant since 2011.

== Titleholders ==
=== Miss Guam Universe ===
- : Declared as Winner
- : Ended as runner-up or top 5/6 qualification
- : Ended as one of the finalists or semifinalists
- : Ended as special awards winner

Year	Village	Miss Guam	Placement at Miss Universe	Special Award(s)	Notes
Joyce Bamba directorship — a franchise holder to Miss Universe from 2008
Did not compete since 2020—Present
2019	Tamuning	Sissie Luo	Unplaced		
2018	Mangilao	Athena McNinch	Unplaced		
2017	Tamuning	Myana Welch	Unplaced		
2016	Yona	Muñeka Taisipic	Unplaced		
Did not compete in 2015
2014	Barrigada	Brittany Bell	Unplaced		Former Miss Arizona USA 2010, Brittany Bell was named Miss Congeniality in 2010. Bell went on to compete in the Miss USA 2010 pageant held at the Planet Hollywood Resort & Casino in Las Vegas, Nevada on May 16, 2010.
2013	Tamuning	Alixes Scott	Unplaced		
2012	Barrigada	Alyssa Cruz Aguero	Unplaced		
2011	Inarajan	Shayna Jo Afaisen	Unplaced		
2010	Dededo	Vanessa Siguenza Torres	Unplaced		The president made the decision the dethrone Vanessa Siguenza Torres due to contract violations of pregnancy after returning from the Miss Universe 2010 contest, held in Las Vegas, Nevada, on August 23, 2010. The title was transferred to the first runner-up, who completed her titleholder responsibilities and duties for the remainder of the year.
2009	Dededo	Racine Manley	Unplaced		
2008	Yona	Siera Monique Robertson	Unplaced		
George and Cecilia Bamba & Guam Beauty Association directorship — a franchise holder to Miss Universe between 1966―2000
Did not compete between 2001—2007
2000	Hagåtña	Lisamarie Quinata	Unplaced		
1999	Hagåtña	Tisha Elaine Heflin	Did not compete		Withdrew from the competition due to illness, replaced by Heather Cunliffe.
1998	Hagåtña	Joylyn Munoz	Unplaced		
Did not compete in 1997
1996	Hagåtña	Aileen Maravilla	Did not compete		
1995	Hagåtña	Alia Tui Stevens	Unplaced		
1994	Hagåtña	Christina Perez	Unplaced		
1993	Hagåtña	Charlene Gumataotao	Unplaced		
1992	Hagåtña	Cheryl Debra Payne	Unplaced		
1991	Hagåtña	Jevon Pellacani	Unplaced		
1990	Hagåtña	Marcia Damian	Unplaced		
1989	Hagåtña	Janiece Santos	Unplaced		
1988	Hagåtña	Liza Maria Camacho	Unplaced	Miss Congeniality	
1987	Hagåtña	Teresa Torres Fisher	Unplaced		
1986	Hagåtña	Dina Reyes Salas	Unplaced	Miss Congeniality	
1985	Hagåtña	Lucy Carbullido Montinola	Unplaced	Miss Congeniality	
1984	Hagåtña	Eleanor Benavente	Unplaced		
1983	Hagåtña	Pamela Booth	Unplaced		
1982	Hagåtña	Patty Chong Kerkos	1st Runner-up	Miss Prensa	
1981	Hagåtña	Rebecca Arroyo	Unplaced		
1980	Hagåtña	Dina Singson Aportadera	Unplaced		
1979	Hagåtña	Marie Cruz	Unplaced		
1978	Hagåtña	Mary Lois Sampson	Unplaced		
1977	Hagåtña	Lisa Ann Caso	Unplaced		
1976	Hagåtña	Pilar Martha Laguana	Unplaced		
1975	Hagåtña	Deborah Lizama Naqui	Unplaced		
1974	Hagåtña	Elizabeth Clara Tenorio	Unplaced		
1973	Hagåtña	Beatrice Benito	Unplaced		
1972	Hagåtña	Patricia Alvárez	Unplaced		
1971	Hagåtña	Linda Mariano Avila	Unplaced		
1970	Hagåtña	Hilary Ann Best	Top 15	Miss Congeniality	
1969	Hagåtña	Anita Johnston	Unplaced		
1968	Hagåtña	Arlene Vilma Chaco	Unplaced		
1967	Hagåtña	Hope Marie Navarro Alvarez	Unplaced		
1966	Hagåtña	Barbara Jean Perez	Unplaced		

=== Wins by village ===
Province	Titles	Years
Hagåtña	34	1966, 1967, 1968, 1969, 1970, 1971, 1972, 1973, 1974, 1975, 1976, 1977, 1978, 1979, 1980, 1981, 1982, 1983, 1984, 1985, 1986, 1987, 1988, 1989, 1990, 1991, 1992, 1993, 1994, 1995, 1996
Tamuning	3	2013, 2017, 2019
Yona	2	2008, 2016
Barrigada	2	2012, 2014
Dededo	2	2009, 2010
Mangilao	1	2018
Inarajan	1	2011

=== Miss Guam International ===
- : Declared as Winner
- : Ended as runner-up or top 5/6 qualification
- : Ended as one of the finalists or semifinalists
- : Ended as special awards winner

Miss Guam has competed since 1964. There are four Miss Guam titleholders in 1979, 1982, 1988 and 1991 who awarded as Miss Friendship in Miss International history. Margaret Frances Glover (Miss International Guam 1967) is the only one Miss Guam who placed as the Top 15 at the Miss International pageant. From 2010 to 2022 the second title of Miss Guam automatically competed at the Miss International pageant.

Year	Village	Miss Guam International	Placement at Miss International	Special Award(s)	Notes
JDP Pageants directorship - a franchise holder to Miss International in 2026
2026		Emily Smith	Did not compete		Stepped down after controversy over heritage
Joyce Bamba directorship — a franchise holder to Miss International from 2010
2022	Chalan Pago-Ordot	Franky Lynn Aguon Hill	Did not compete		Withdrew for unknown reasons.
Due to the impact of COVID-19 pandemic, no pageant between 2020—2021
2019	Mangilao	Athena McNinch	Unplaced		
2019	—	Kirsten Lydia Dahilig	Did not compete		Did not meet the minimum age requirements for Miss International pageant.
2018	Hagåtña	Diliana Tuncap	Unplaced	Miss International Oceania	
Did not compete in 2017
2016	Hagåtña	Annalyn Buan	Unplaced		
2015	Hagåtña	Loriann Rabe	Unplaced		
Did not compete in 2014
2013	Hagåtña	Lirone Veskler	Unplaced		
2012	Agana Heights	Chanel Cruz Jarrett	Unplaced		
2011	Dededo	Katarina Maria Martinez	Unplaced		
2010	Dededo	Lalaine Mercado	Unplaced		
Guam Beauty Association directorship — a franchise holder to Miss International between 1964―2000
Did not compete between 2001—2009
2000	—	LizaMarie Cabrera-Camacho	Unplaced		
1999	—	Lourdes Jeanette Rivera	Unplaced		
Did not compete between 1996—1998
1995	—	Marie Angelique Penrose	Unplaced		
1994	—	Nadine Theresa Gogue	Unplaced		
Did not compete in 1993
1992	—	Lisa Marie Martin	Unplaced		
1991	—	Norma Jean Cepeda	Unplaced	Miss Friendship	
1990	—	Cassandra Lynn Calvo	Unplaced		
1989	—	Janiece Annette Santos	Unplaced		
1988	—	Liza Maria Camacho	Unplaced	Miss Friendship	
1987	—	Geraldine Dydasco Gumataotao	Unplaced		
1986	—	Dina Ann Reyes Salas	Unplaced		
1985	—	Teresa Artero Kasperbauer	Unplaced		
1984	—	Eleanor Benavente Umagat	Unplaced		
1983	—	Shannon Dilbeck	Unplaced		
1982	—	Donna Lee Harmon	Unplaced	Miss Friendship	
1981	—	Cecilia Crisostomo Daga	Unplaced		
1980	—	Conchita Sannicolas Taitano	Unplaced		
1979	—	Vivian Elaine Indalecio	Unplaced	Miss Friendship	
1978	—	Carmen Blas Sablan	Unplaced		
1977	—	Linda Sandlin	Unplaced		
1976	—	Thelma Zenaida Hechanova	Unplaced		
1975	—	Clarissa Perez Duenas	Unplaced		
1974	—	Roseann Janice Waller	Unplaced		
1973	—	Elaine Marques	Unplaced		
1972	—	Edna Maria Quintanilla	Unplaced		
1971	—	Phyllis May Bost	Unplaced		
1970	—	Flora C. Baza	Unplaced		
1969	—	Mercedes Rosario Rubic	Unplaced		
Did not compete in 1968
1967	—	Margaret Frances Glover	Top 15		
Did not compete in 1966
1965	—	Bennett Ann Crisostomo	Unplaced		
1964	—	Doris Sablan	Unplaced		
