= Shawn Weatherly =

American 1980 beauty queen, actress

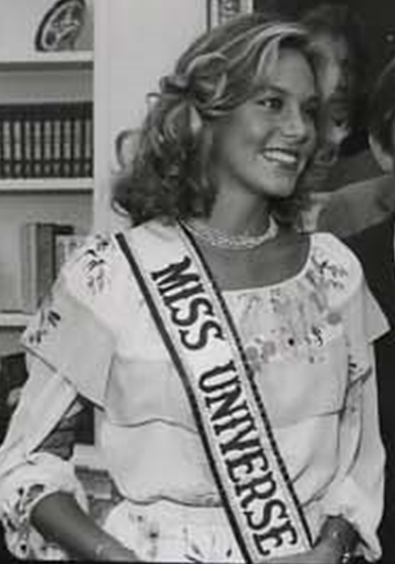
- Weatherly in the Oval Office, 1981
- Born: July 24, 1959 (age 67); San Antonio, Texas, U.S.
- Spouse: Chip Harris (m. 1994)
- Children: Two
- Beauty pageant titleholder
- Title: Miss South Carolina USA 1980; Miss USA 1980; Miss Universe 1980
- Education: Clemson University
- Occupation: Actress
- Years active: 1980–2014
- Known for: Police Academy 3: Back in Training; Baywatch

Shawn Weatherly (born July 24, 1959) is an American actress and beauty queen who won the titles of Miss USA 1980 and Miss Universe 1980. She starred as Cadet Karen Adams in the film Police Academy 3: Back in Training (1986) and as Jill Riley in the first season of the TV series Baywatch (1989–1990). She was also preceded and succeeded by Venezuelan delegates in Miss Universe.

== Early life ==
Shawn Weatherly was born on July 24, 1959, in San Antonio, Texas, and was raised in Sumter, South Carolina. She grew up alongside two brothers, Kurt and Michael. Their father, Albert Weatherly, was a Lieutenant Colonel in the United States Air Force. Their mother, Joanne Weatherly, died of cancer in 1968.

Weatherly attended Clemson University as a nursing major and was a member of the Delta Delta Delta sorority.

== Career ==
Weatherly is best known for her work as Jill Riley on the television show Baywatch and for the early reality show Oceanquest, which had her swimming with sharks. She played a small part on The Dukes of Hazzard episode "Coy vs. Vance," and she appeared in other shows such as The A-Team, Thirtysomething, T. J. Hooker and Happy Days. She also had a main role in the 1986 comedy film Police Academy 3: Back in Training. In 2014, she was in the horror-comedy film Love in the Time of Monsters.

== Personal life ==
In 1994, Weatherly married Chip Harris, president of a biotech research company, and they have two children. Previously, she had relationships with Ted McGinley, Lee Majors and Dwight Clark.

== Filmography ==
Film
Year	Title	Role	Notes
1984	Cannonball Run II	Blake's Girl	
1986	Police Academy 3: Back in Training	Cadet Karen Adams	
1988	Party Line	Stacy Sloan	
1989	Mind Games	Rita Lund	
1990	Shadowzone	Dr. Kidwell	
1990	Thieves of Fortune	Petra Christopher	
1992	Amityville: It's About Time	Andrea Livingston	
1998	Dancer, Texas Pop. 81	Sue Ann	
1998	Detached	Wife	Short film
1999	Five Aces	Jackie	
2001	Rustin	Kay Stagen	
2014	Love in the Time of Monsters	Marianna	

Television
Year	Title	Role	Notes
1983	The Dukes of Hazzard	Billie Ann Baxley	Episode: "Coy vs. Vance"
1983	The A-Team	Driving Woman	Episode: "Recipe for Heavy Bread"
1983	T.J. Hooker	Claudia Cole	4 episodes
1983	Happy Days	Sissy	Episode: "Where the Guys Are"
1983	Lottery!	Sibyl	Episode: "Boston: False Illusion"
1984	Shaping Up	Melissa McDonald	Main cast (5 episodes)
1985	Hunter	Sherry	Episode: "The Shooter"
1985	Oceanquest	Herself	Main cast (6 episodes)
1985	Amazing Stories	Beauty Pageant Contestant	Episode: "Remote Control Man"
1987	The New Leave It to Beaver	Christine	Episode: "Super Sunday"
1987	Matlock	Debra O'Keefe	Episode: "The Rat Pack"
1987	Summer Breeze	Amy Dupree	Episode: "Pilot"
1987	The New Adventures of Beans Baxter	Svetlana	2 episodes
1987–1988	J.J. Starbuck	Jill Starbuck	Main cast (13 episodes)
1988	Private Eye	Ruth Corrigan	Episode: "Hollywood Confidential"
1988	Beverly Hills Buntz	Paralegal	Episode: "Cannon-Aid"
1989	Baywatch: Panic on Malibu Pier	Jill Riley	Television film
1989–1990	Baywatch	Jill Riley	Main cast (18 episodes)
1991	Thirtysomething	Andrea Livingston	Episode: "A Stop at Willoughby"
1992	Jack's Place	Ali	Episode: "Solo"
1995	Murder, She Wrote	Kate Danbury	Episode: "Shooting in Rome"
1998	Safety Patrol	Mrs. Bozell	Television film
1999	Chicago Hope	Carol Derricks	Episode: "Vigilance and Care"
2000	V.I.P.	Margot Burns	Episode: "Throw Val from the Train"
2010	Cold Case	Bunny Hargreave	Episode: "The Runaway Bunny"

Awards and achievements
Preceded by (Venezuela) Maritza Sayalero	Miss Universe; 1980	Succeeded by (Venezuela) Irene Sáez
Preceded by Mary Therese Friel	Miss USA; 1980	Succeeded by Jineane Ford
Preceded by Janice McDonald	Miss South Carolina USA; 1980	Succeeded by Zade Turner
