= Miss Universe 1980 =

29th Miss Universe pageant

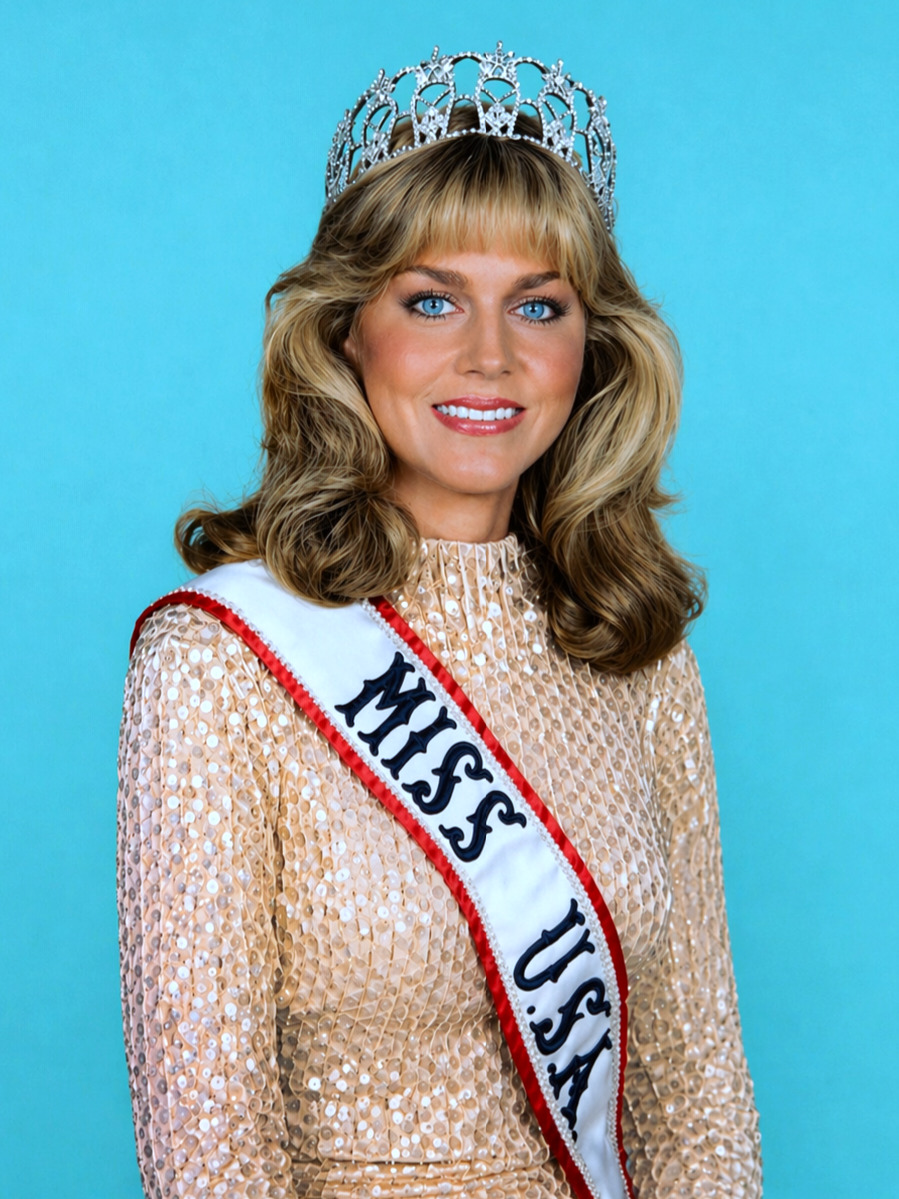
- Shawn Weatherly
- Date: 8 July 1980 (Note: The event was held at 8:00 am Korea Time (UTC+09:00); for the Americas, this was July 7 in their local times including the United States.)
- Presenters: Bob Barker; Helen O'Connell; Jayne Kennedy
- Entertainment: Donny Osmond
- Venue: Sejong Cultural Center, Seoul, South Korea
- Broadcaster: CBS (international); KBS (official broadcaster)
- Entrants: 69
- Placements: 12
- Debuts: Cayman Islands; Turks and Caicos Islands
- Withdrawals: Antigua; Barbados; Bophuthatswana; El Salvador; Fiji; Mauritius; Portugal; Saint Kitts; Saint Vincent; South Africa; Suriname; Transkei
- Returns: Curaçao; Guadeloupe; Indonesia; Sint Maarten
- Winner: Shawn Weatherly; United States

Miss Universe 1980 was the 29th Miss Universe pageant, held at the Sejong Cultural Center in Seoul, South Korea, on 8 July 1980. It was the first time in the pageant's history that the event was held in South Korea.

At the conclusion of the event, Maritza Sayalero of Venezuela crowned her successor Shawn Weatherly of the United States as Miss Universe 1980. This is fifth victory of the United States in the pageant's history.

Contestants from sixty-nine countries and territories participated in this year's pageant. The pageant was hosted by Bob Barker in his fourteenth consecutive year, while Helen O'Connell and Jayne Kennedy provided commentary and analysis throughout the event. Donny Osmond performed in this edition.

== Background ==
=== Location and date ===
On 15 January 1980, Miami City Commissioner Armando Lacasa informed the Metro Tourist Development Council that the organizers of Miss Universe Inc. had promised to hold the competition in Miami in July. However, officials were not interested in bringing the pageant back to the city, stating that the pageant is no longer aligned with the preferences of the residents of Miami.

On 25 February 1980, Kim Jhoong-key, business director of the Hankook Ilbo-Korea Times Group, was invited to a luncheon with Chun Doo-hwan of the ROK Army Security Command and Chang Kang-jae, the then-chairman of the Hankook Ilbo-Korea Times Group, to discuss the possibility of holding the Miss Universe pageant in South Korea. Chun was pleased to learn from Kim that the Hankook Ilbo had the potential to host the competition, and he subsequently sent Kim to New York to speak with Harold Glasser, the president of Miss Universe Inc.

One day after lunch, Kim flew to New York to meet with Glasser, who agreed to hold the competition in South Korea on July 8. Since South Korea’s bid was submitted four months before the competition, Miss Universe Inc. granted Kim a $320,000 USD discount on the hosting fee.

== Results ==
Sejong Cultural Center in Seoul

=== Placements ===
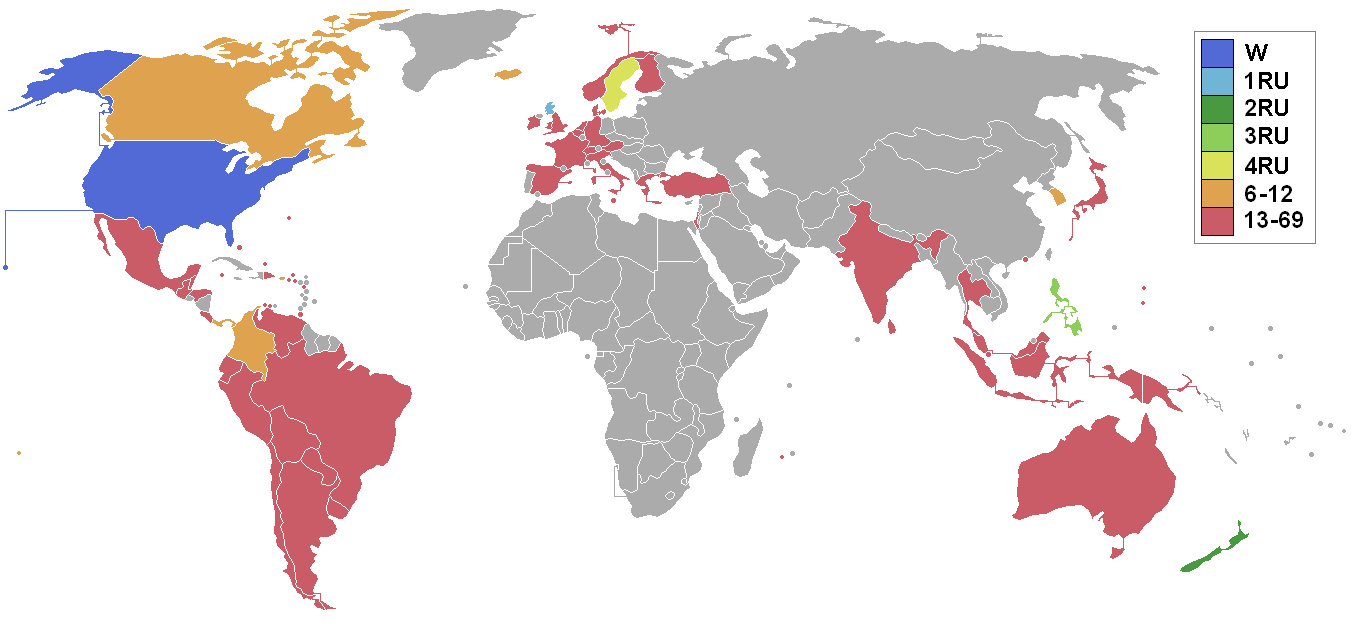
Miss Universe 1980 participating nations and results

| Placement | Contestant |
|---|---|
| Miss Universe 1980 | United States – Shawn Weatherly |
| 1st Runner-Up | Scotland – Linda Gallagher |
| 2nd Runner-Up | New Zealand – Delyse Nottle |
| 3rd Runner-Up | Philippines – Rosario Silayan |
| 4th Runner-Up | Sweden – Eva Andersson |
| Top 12 | Canada – Teresa MacKay; Colombia – María Patricia Arbeláez; Iceland – Guðbjörg Sigurdardóttir; Panama – Gloria Karamañites; Puerto Rico – Agnes Tañón; South Korea – Eun-jung Kim; Tahiti – Thilda Fuller |

==== Final scores ====
- Winner First runner-up Second runner-up Third runner-up Fourth runner-up (#) Rank in each round of competition

| Country/Territory | Preliminary Average | Interview | Swimsuit | Evening Gown | Semifinal Average |
|---|---|---|---|---|---|
| United States | 8.480 (1) | 8.317 (1) | 8.718 (1) | 8.883 (1) | 8.639 (1) |
| Scotland | 7.785 (3) | 8.036 (5) | 8.273 (3) | 8.267 (5) | 8.192 (5) |
| New Zealand | 7.885 (2) | 8.283 (2) | 8.400 (2) | 8.400 (3) | 8.361 (2) |
| Philippines | 7.662 (5) | 8.121 (4) | 8.033 (6) | 8.433 (2) | 8.196 (4) |
| Sweden | 7.572 (8) | 8.208 (3) | 8.250 (4) | 8.346 (4) | 8.268 (3) |
| Canada | 7.711 (4) | 7.992 (6) | 8.200 (5) | 8.100 (6) | 8.097 (6) |
| Puerto Rico | 7.598 (7) | 7.850 (7) | 7.892 (8) | 7.867 (10) | 7.870 (7) |
| Iceland | 7.636 (6) | 7.675 (10) | 7.942 (7) | 7.933 (9) | 7.850 (8) |
| South Korea | 7.525 (11) | 7.658 (11) | 7.750 (10) | 7.967 (8) | 7.792 (9) |
| Colombia | 7.531 (10) | 7.789 (8) | 7.729 (12) | 7.842 (11) | 7.787 (10) |
| Panama | 7.514 (12) | 7.713 (9) | 7.742 (11) | 7.825 (12) | 7.760 (11) |
| Tahiti | 7.566 (9) | 6.957 (12) | 7.858 (9) | 8.067 (7) | 7.627 (12) |

== Contestants ==
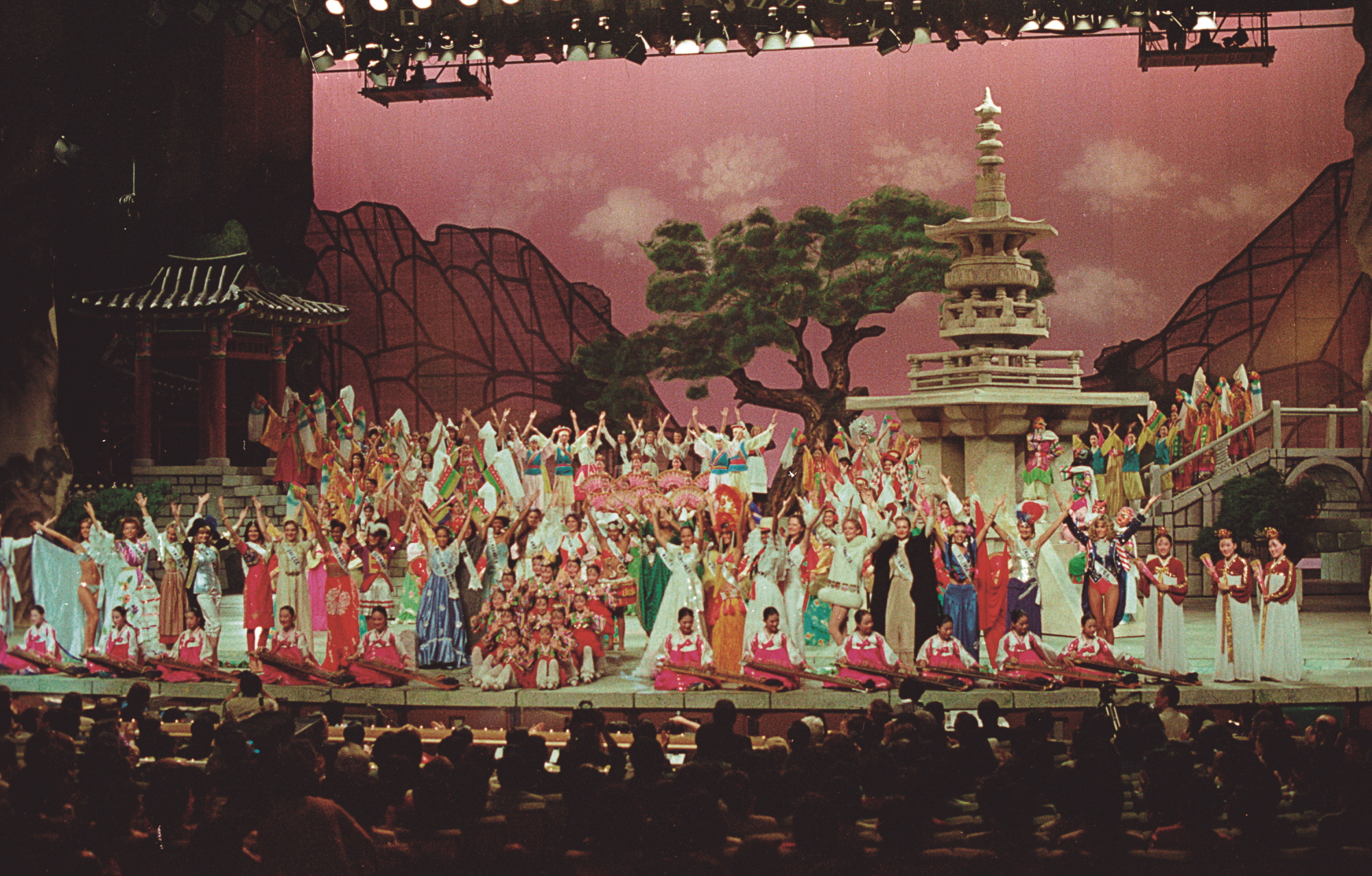
Many contestants in Miss Universe 1980.

- Argentina – Silvia Piedrabuena
- Aruba – Magaly Maduro
- Australia – Katrina Redina
- Austria – Isabel Muller
- Bahamas – Darlene Davies
- Belgium – Brigitte Billen
- Belize – Ellen Marie Clarke
- Bermuda – Jill Murphy
- Bolivia – Carmen Sonia Pereira Parada
- Brazil – Eveline Schroeter
- British Virgin Islands – Barbara Stevens
- Canada – Teresa Lynn McKay
- Cayman Islands – Dealia Devon Walter
- Chile – María Gabriela Campusano Puelma
- Colombia – Maria Patricia Arbeláez
- Costa Rica – Barbara Herrero
- Curaçao – Hassana Hamoud
- Denmark – Jane Bill
- Dominican Republic – Milagros Germán
- Ecuador – Verónica Rivas
- England – Julie Duckworth
- Finland – Sirpa Viljamaa
- France – Brigitte Choquet
- Greece – Roula Kanellapoulou
- Guadeloupe – Elydie de Gage
- Guam – Dina Aportadera
- Guatemala – Lizabeth Iveth Martínez Noack
- Holland – Karin Gooyer
- Honduras – Etelvina Raudales Velásquez
- Hong Kong – Wanda Tai
- Iceland – Guðbjörg Sigurdardóttir
- India – Sangeeta Bijlani
- Indonesia – Andi Nana Riwayatie Basoamier
- Ireland – Maura McMenamim
- Israel – Ilana Shoshan
- Italy – Loredana "Lory" Del Santo
- Japan – Hisae Hiyama
- Malaysia – Felicia Yong
- Malta – Isabelle Zammit
- Mexico – Ana Patricia Nuñez Romero
- New Zealand – Delyse Nottle
- Northern Mariana Islands – Angelina Camacho Chong
- Norway – Maiken Nielsen
- Panama – Gloria Karamañites
- Papua New Guinea – Mispah Alwyn
- Paraguay – Martha Galli
- Peru – Mariailce Ramis
- Philippines – Maria Rosario "Chat" Silayan
- Puerto Rico – Agnes Tañón Correa
- Réunion – Myrose Hoareau
- Scotland – Linda Gallagher
- Singapore – Ann Chua Ai Choo
- Sint Maarten – Lucie Marie Davic
- South Korea – Kim Eun-jung
- Spain – Yolanda Hoyos
- Sri Lanka – Hyacinth Kurukulasuriya
- Sweden – Eva Andersson
- Switzerland – Margrit Kilchoer
- (French Polynesia) Tahiti – Thilda Raina Fuller
- Thailand – Artitaya Promkul
- Trinidad and Tobago – Althea Rocke
- Turkey – Heyecan Gokoglou
- Turks and Caicos Islands – Constance Lightbourne
- United States – Shawn Weatherly
- United States Virgin Islands – Deborah Mardenborough
- Uruguay – Beatriz Antuñez
- Venezuela – Maye Brandt
- Wales – Kim Ashfield
- West Germany – Kathrin Glotzl
