= Miss USA 2002 =

51st Miss USA pageant

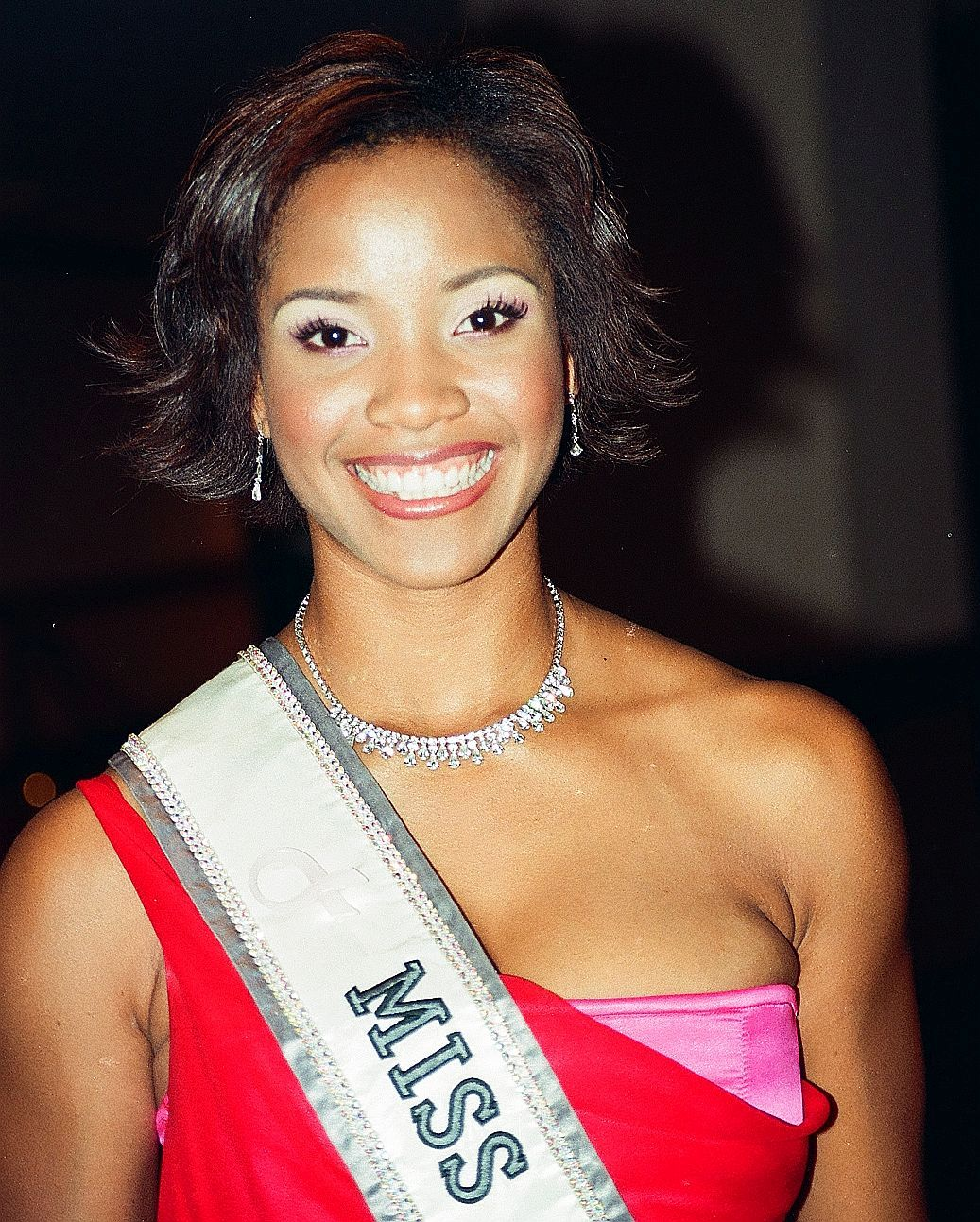
- Shauntay Hinton of District of Columbia, Miss USA 2002
- Date: March 1, 2002
- Presenters: Deion Sanders; Ali Landry
- Entertainment: Sara Evans
- Venue: Genesis Convention Center, Gary, Indiana
- Broadcaster: CBS, WBBM-TV
- Entrants: 51
- Placements: 12
- Winner: Shauntay Hinton; District of Columbia

Miss USA 2002 was the 51st Miss USA pageant, held at Genesis Convention Center in Gary, Indiana on March 1, 2002. The event was won by Shauntay Hinton of the District of Columbia, who was crowned by outgoing queen Kandace Krueger of Texas. The host was Deion Sanders.

This was the last Miss USA show was aired on CBS. Beginning with Miss USA 2003, NBC assumed co-ownership of the pageant along with Donald Trump, and as a result began televising the pageant.

== Results ==
=== Placements ===
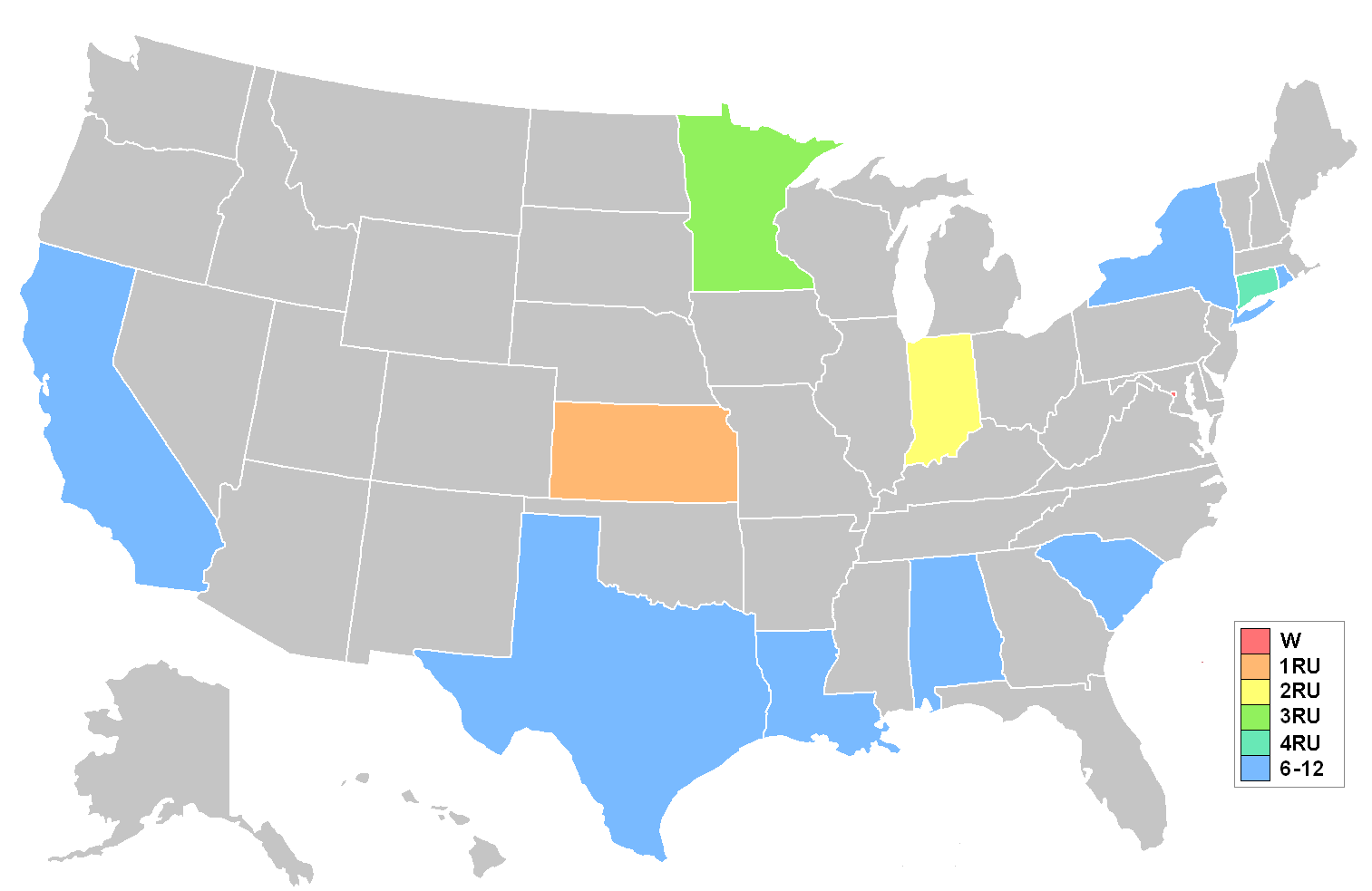
Map showing placements by state

Final results	Contestant
Miss USA 2002	(Washington, D.C.) District of Columbia – Shauntay Hinton
1st Runner-Up	Kansas – Lindsay Douglas
2nd Runner-Up	Indiana – Kelly Lloyd
3rd Runner-Up	Minnesota – Lanore van Buren
4th Runner-Up	Connecticut – Alita Hawaah Dawson
Top 12	Alabama – Tara Tucker; California – Tarah Peters; Louisiana – Anne Lene; (New York (state)) New York – Karla Cavalli; Rhode Island – Janet Sutton; South Carolina – Ashley Williams; Texas – Kasi Kelly

== Delegates ==
The Miss USA 2002 delegates were:

- Alabama – Tara Tucker
- Alaska – Christine Olejniczak
- Arizona – Jennifer Lenz
- Arkansas – Amber Boatman
- California – Tarah Marie Peters
- Colorado – Keely Gaston
- Connecticut – Alita Dawson
- Delaware – Deborah Ann Hoffman
- District of Columbia – Shauntay Hinton
- Florida – Shannon Ford
- Georgia – Heather Hogan
- Hawaii – Juliet Lighter
- Idaho – Hilary Ball
- Illinois – Amanda Reynolds
- Indiana – Kelly Lloyd
- Iowa – Lauren Wilson
- Kansas – Lindsey Douglas
- Kentucky – Elizabeth Arnold
- Louisiana – Anne-Katherine Lené
- Maine – Su-Ying Leung
- Maryland – Misti Adams
- Massachusetts – Latoyia Foster
- Michigan – Rebekah Lynn Decker
- Minnesota – Lanore van Buren
- Mississippi – Heather Soriano
- Missouri – Melana Scantlin
- Montana – Meredith McCannel
- Nebraska – Stacey Skidmore
- Nevada – Jenny Valdez
- New Hampshire – Audra Paquette
- New Jersey – Robin Williams
- New Mexico – Ellyn Colyer
- New York – Karla Cavalli
- North Carolina – Alison English
- North Dakota – Amy Elkins
- Ohio – Kimberly Mullen
- Oklahoma – Kasie Head
- Oregon – Kristi Walkowski
- Pennsylvania – Nicole Bigham
- Rhode Island – Janet Sutton
- South Carolina – Ashley Williams
- South Dakota – Sitania Syrovatka
- Tennessee – Allison Alderson
- Texas – Kasi Kelly
- Utah – Abbie Smith
- Vermont – Brooke Angus
- Virginia – Julie Laipply
- Washington – Carly Shorten
- West Virginia – Angela Davenport
- Wisconsin – Cortney Owen
- Wyoming – Jeannie Crofts

== Historical significance ==
- District of Columbia wins competition for the second time. This became the first win for the District of Columbia in 38 years, when Bobbie Johnson won Miss USA 1964.
- Kansas earns the 1st runner-up position for the second time. The last time it placed this was in 1996.
- Indiana earns the 2nd runner-up position for the second time. The last time it placed this was in 1966. Also had its highest placement since 1981.
- Minnesota earns the 3rd runner-up position for the first time and reaches its highest placement since 1995.
- Connecticut earns the 4th runner-up position for the first time and reaches its highest placement since 1966.
- States that placed in semifinals the previous year were District of Columbia, Rhode Island and Texas. All of them made their second consecutive placement.
- Alabama, Kansas, New York and South Carolina last placed in 2000.
- California and Indiana last placed in 1999.
- Louisiana last placed in 1998.
- Minnesota last placed in 1995.
- Connecticut last placed in 1969.
- Georgia breaks an ongoing streak of placements since 2000.
- Tennessee breaks an ongoing streak of placements since 1999.
- Michigan breaks an ongoing streak of placements since 1998.

== Swimsuit controversy ==
Controversy erupted over the choice of swimsuits for the swimsuit final competition. Six of the 51 delegates chose an all-red one-piece, while the rest wore a two-piece option. The New York Post reported one contestant, Tarah Marie Peters of California, had points deducted by one judge because of her choice of a one-piece suit, thus eliminating her from the top five contestants. She was the only one of the top twelve who wore the one-piece option.

== Crossovers ==
Ten delegates had previously competed in either the Miss Teen USA or Miss America pageants, including the two Triple Crown winners who had competed in both. One delegate later won a Miss America state title.

Delegates who had previously held a Miss Teen USA state title were:

- Kelly Lloyd (Indiana) - Miss Indiana Teen USA 1993 (1st runner-up at Miss Teen USA 1993)
- Nicole Bigham (Pennsylvania) - Miss Pennsylvania Teen USA 1994
- Allison Alderson (Tennessee) - Miss Tennessee Teen USA 1994 (Top 6 finalist at Miss Teen USA 1994)
- Melana Scantlin (Missouri) - Miss Missouri Teen USA 1995 (Top 12 semi-finalist at Miss Teen USA 1995)
- Tara Tucker (Alabama) - Miss Alabama Teen USA 1997
- Alita Dawson (Connecticut) - Miss Connecticut Teen USA 1997
- Elizabeth Arnold (Kentucky) - Miss Kentucky Teen USA 1998
- Christine Olejniczak (Alaska) - Miss Alaska Teen USA 2000

Delegates who had previously held a Miss America state title or would later win one were:

- Keely Gaston (Colorado) - Miss Colorado 1998
- Heather Soriano (Mississippi) - Miss Mississippi 1999
- Kelly Lloyd (Indiana) - Miss Indiana 1999 (Albert A. Marks Jr. Interview award)
- Allison Alderson (Tennessee) - Miss Tennessee 1999
- Audra Paquette (New Hampshire) - Miss New Hampshire 2005

Delegates who participate in other beauty pageant later are:

- Brooke Elizabeth Angus (Vermont) - Representative of United States in Miss World 2006.

== Judges ==
- Tom Brady
- Joyce Brothers
- Willa Ford
- Jermaine Jackson
- Kim Powers
- Audrey Quock
- Victor Williams
- Nikki Ziering

== See also ==
- Miss Universe 2002
