= Miss Mississippi USA =

Beauty pageant competition

- Formation: 1952
- Type: Beauty pageant
- Headquarters: Collierville
- Location: Tennessee
- Members: Miss USA
- Official language: English
- Key people: Kimberly Payne Greenwood, State Pageant Director
- Website: Official website

The Miss Mississippi USA competition is the pageant that selects the representative for the state of Mississippi in the Miss USA pageant. The pageant was directed by Premier Pageants from 2001 to 2010, before becoming part of Greenwood Productions in 2010 under the ownership of Miss Tennessee USA 1989 Kimberly Payne Greenwood.

Mississippi has had 13 Miss USA placements as of 2024. They won Miss USA in 2020 with Asya Branch winning the Miss USA 2020 title, becoming the 36th state to have the Miss USA title, 33rd to be crowned. Eight titleholders have competed at Miss Teen USA, and as of 2025, four have competed at Miss America, including Branch. The most recent placement was Kaylee Brooke McCollum in 2024.

Victoria Cantu of Brownsville, TX was appointed Miss Mississippi USA 2026 on July 30th, 2026 after the open casting call from Thomas Brodeur, the new owner of the national pageant. She will represent Mississippi at Miss USA 2026.

== Results summary ==
=== Placements ===
- Miss USA: Asya Branch (2020)
- 1st runner-up: Leah Laviano (2008)
- 3rd runners-up: Cindy Williams (1986)
- 4th runners-up: Laurie Kimbrough (1979), Dana Richmond (1988)
- Top 10/11/12: Kathy Manning (1987), Stephanie Teneyck (1990), Jennifer Adcock (2005), Breanne Ponder (2010)
- Top 15/16/20: Marlene Britsch (1961), Patricia Ann Turk (1964), Bailey Anderson (2021), Kaylee Brooke McCollum (2024)

Mississippi holds a record of 13 placements at Miss USA.

=== Awards ===
- Miss Photogenic: Stephanie Teneyck (1990)
- Impact Award: Sydney Russell (2023)

== Winners ==
Color key

- Declared as Winner
- Ended as runner-up
- Ended as one of the finalists or semifinalists

Year	Name	Hometown	Age^{1}	Local title	Placement at Miss USA	Special awards at Miss USA	Notes
2026	Victoria Cantu	Brownsville, TX	27	Miss Rio Grande Valley			
2025	McKenzie Cole	Vicksburg	19	Miss Vicksburg			Previously Miss Mississippi Teen USA 2022
2024	Kaylee Brooke McCollum	Amory	23	Miss Monroe County	Top 20		Previously Miss Mississippi Teen USA 2019; 3rd runner-up at Miss Teen USA 2019
2023	Sydney Russell	Meridian	24	Miss Lauderdale Co.		Impact Award	
2022	Hailey White	Picayune	23	Miss Southern Magnolia			
2021	Bailey Anderson	Hurley	22	Miss Jackson County	Top 16		Longest reigning Miss Mississippi USA (1 year and 20 days)
2020	Asya Danielle Branch	Booneville	22	Miss Northeast MS	Miss USA 2020		First African American Miss Mississippi USA; Previously Miss Mississippi 2018; Top 21 at Miss Universe 2020
2019	Madeleine Overby	Columbus	20	Miss Hattiesburg			Former New Orleans Saintsation cheerleader
2018	Laine Alden Mansour	Tupelo	21	Miss Tupelo			
2017	Ashley Hamby	Madison	23	Miss Madison Co.			
2016	Haley Brooke Sowers	Meridian	22	Miss Lauderdale Co.			Previously Miss Mississippi Teen USA 2010 & 4th runner-up at Miss Teen USA 2010; Former Tennessee Titan cheerleader
2015	Courtney Byrd	Oxford	22	Miss North Mississippi			
2014	Chelsea Reardon	Southaven	23	Miss Heart of Dixie			International Junior Miss Teen 2010
2013	Paromita Mitra	Hattiesburg	21	Miss Starkville			Previously Miss Mississippi Teen USA 2009
2012	Myverick Rashea Garcia	Hattiesburg	21	Miss Dixieland			
2011	Keeley Patterson	Starkville	20	Miss Starkville			
2010	Courtney Breanne Ponder	Mount Olive	20		Top 10		
2009	Jessica Lauren McRaney	Terry	23				Previously Miss Mississippi Teen USA 2004
2008	Leah Laviano	Ellisville	19		1st runner-up		
2007	Jalin Wood	Waynesboro	25				Previously Miss Mississippi 2004
2006	Kendra King	Monticello	20				
2005	Jennifer Leigh Adcock	Hattiesburg	24		Top 10		Previously Miss Mississippi 2002, semifinalist at Miss America 2003, Mississippi's Junior Miss 1998
2004	Beth Richards	Laurel	25				
2003	Allison Bloodworth	Grenada	21				Previously Miss Mississippi Teen USA 1999
2002	Heather Michelle Soriano	Philadelphia	24				Previously Miss Mississippi 1999
2001	Melanie Vaughn	Olive Branch					
2000	Angie Michelle Carpenter	Greenwood					Previously Miss Mississippi Teen USA 1994, semifinalist at Miss Teen USA 1994
1999	Kari Lynn Babski	Gloster					
1998	Angel Whatley	Jackson					
1997	Arleen McDonald	Tupelo					Previously Miss Mississippi Teen USA 1992, semifinalist at Miss Teen USA 1992
1996	Caroline Ramagos	Soso					
1995	Jill Tullos						Married Senator Chris McDaniel
1994	Leslie Lynn Jetton						Gave up her title in March to become a national spokesperson for Caribe Corporations in New Orleans.
1993	Sherry Bowles	Lambert					
1992	Tammy Johnson	Jackson	22				Previously Mississippi's Miss Hospitality 1989
1991	Mitzi Swanson						
1990	Stephanie Teneyck		20		Semi-finalist	Miss Photogenic	2nd Runner up at Miss All Nations 1990
1989	Laura Leigh Durrett	Olive Branch					
1988	Dana Michele Richmond	Madison	20		4th runner-up		1st Runner up at Miss International 1988
1987	Katharine Clare "Kathy" Manning	Drew	24		Semi-finalist		Previously Miss Mississippi 1984, 2nd runner-up at Miss America 1985
1986	Cindy Jane Williams	Hattiesburg	22		3rd runner-up		Semifinalist at Miss International 1986
1985	Camille Gilliland	Meridian					
1984	Carla Green	Biloxi					
1983	Becky Case	Jackson					
1982	Nancy Perkins	Marks					
1981	Angela Ashmore						
1980	Cheri Brown	Meridian					Previously Miss Mississippi 1978, preliminary swimsuit winner at Miss America 1979
1979	Laurie Frances Kimbrough	Oxford			4th runner-up		
1978	Wanda Gatlin						
1977	Leigh Tapley	Jackson					
1976	Teresa Camp						
1975	Leigh Ann Cross	Hernando					
1974	Denise Clark						
1973	Karen Clements						
1972	Deborah Lynn Pawlik						
1971	Janey Diane Gillis						
1970	Susan Marsha Ladner	Pass Christian					
1969	Rose Marie Ray						
1968	Brenda Kay Conerly						
1967	Lassie Cooke						
1966	Jane Sutherland						
1965	Madeline Carol Scarbrough						
1964	Patricia Ann Turk				Semi-finalist		
1963	Joan Elizabeth Kinnebrew	Hattiesburg					competed in the 1964 Miss Dixie Pageant
1962	Sandra Mazur	Jackson					competed in the 1963 Miss Dixie Pageant
1961	Marlene Britsch				Semi-finalist		
1954–1960	Did not compete						
1953	Jessie Wynn Morgan						Previously Miss Mississippi 1951, semi-finalist at Miss America 1952
1952	Carolyn Jeanette Thomas		20				Died in 2008.

^{1} Age at the time of the Miss USA pageant
