= Ashley Durham =

American model (born 1990)

- Born: Ashley Elizabeth Durham; April 9, 1990 (age 36); Adamsville, Tennessee, U.S.
- Height: 5 ft 8 in (1.73 m)
- Spouse: David Booth
- Beauty pageant titleholder
- Title: Miss Tennessee Teen USA 2006, Miss Tennessee USA 2011
- Hair color: Blonde
- Eye color: Blue
- Major competitions: Miss Tennessee Teen USA 2006 (Winner); Miss Teen USA 2006; Miss Tennessee USA 2011 (Winner); Miss USA 2011 (1st Runner-up)

Ashley Elizabeth Durham (born April 9, 1990) is an American model and beauty pageant titleholder who won Miss Tennessee Teen USA 2006 and Miss Tennessee USA 2011.

Durham won the Miss Tennessee Teen USA 2006 title in October 2005 representing Adamsville. Her sister titleholder was Lauren Grissom. To win the title, Durham edged out Johnna Disterdick who was the daughter of Miss Tennessee 1982, Miss Tennessee USA 1984, Desiree Denise Daniels, and Tucker Perry who would later crown Durham Miss Tennessee USA 2011. Durham went on to compete at Miss Teen USA 2006 but failed to place.

Five years later Durham won the Miss Tennessee USA 2011 title on her first attempt. She is the fifth Miss Tennessee Teen USA titleholder to win the Miss Tennessee USA pageant, following former Miss USA titleholders Lynnette Cole and Rachel Smith who also held both Tennessee titles. Durham's sister titleholder is Kaitlin White, Miss Tennessee Teen USA 2011.

Durham ended as 1st runner-up in Miss USA 2011 pageant in held in Las Vegas. Her final question dealt with the First Amendment, and whether it should protect burning religious books. There was some controversy after the show was over when pageant judge Penn Jillette said about her, "She negated the whole First Amendment," Jillette said in a tweet Sunday night. "Glad to help her lose." "Durham fired back at Jillette in a statement issued Tuesday through state pageant officials, saying she's disappointed with Jillette's reaction. She said it's uncalled for that he would delight in shooting down her dreams."

Durham graduated from Adamsville Jr/Sr High School in 2008, where she was a varsity cheerleader. She graduated from the University of Memphis in 2012 where she majored in journalism and public relations.

She also models for Tony Bowls where she has made many catalogue covers for Tony Bowls and appeared in magazines such as Seventeen, Cosmo, Justine, Hour Detroit, Golf Digest, among others. She is currently signed with Ford Models in Miami, Chicago, Wilhelmenia LA and New View Model Management.

== Personal life ==
Durham was introduced to David Booth, a former professional hockey player who played for several teams in the NHL, by Durham's friend and former Miss USA 2011 Alyssa Campanella. In June 2014, the couple married and subsequently both have appeared on the Canadian television show, Hockey Wives.

Awards and achievements
Preceded by (Oklahoma) Morgan Woolard	Miss USA 1st Runner-Up; 2011	Succeeded by (Maryland) Nana Meriwether
Preceded by Tessa Reyes	Miss Tennessee Teen USA; 2006	Succeeded by Macy Erwin
Preceded by Tucker Perry	Miss Tennessee USA; 2011	Succeeded by Jessica Hibler
