= Lauren Grissom =

- Born: Lauren Blair Grissom; 1985 (age 40–41); Shelbyville, Tennessee, U.S.
- Height: 5 ft 8 in (1.73 m)
- Beauty pageant titleholder
- Title: Miss Tennessee USA 2006
- Hair color: Brown
- Eye color: Blue
- Major competition: Miss USA 2006 (Top 15)

Lauren Blair Grissom (born 1985) is a beauty queen from Shelbyville, Tennessee who has held the Miss Tennessee USA title.

Grissom won the Miss Tennessee USA title in a state pageant held in Clarksville on 7 October 2005.

Grissom represented Tennessee in the Miss USA 2006 pageant broadcast live from Baltimore, Maryland on April 21, 2006. She placed as a semi-finalist in the nationally televised pageant, which was won by Tara Conner of Kentucky.

Grissom graduated from the Webb School in Bell Buckle, Tennessee in 2003, after which she worked as a model. She has appeared in 16 music videos, including those for Jake Owen, Keith Urban, Bon Jovi, and Uncle Kracker.

Grissom has also been in commercials, print ads, movies and fashion shows around the world. She came home to continue her education at Middle Tennessee State University as an art major before transferring to study Interior Design. She now has a degree in Interior design from O'More College of Design, and is doing event planning in the Nashville area.

Grissom appeared in the second season of VH1's reality show You're Cut Off! 2 in 2011. After the show aired, she continued her interior design & modeling career.

Awards and achievements
Preceded by Amy Colley	Miss Tennessee USA; 2006	Succeeded by Rachel Smith
