= Miss USA 1968 =

17th Miss USA pageant

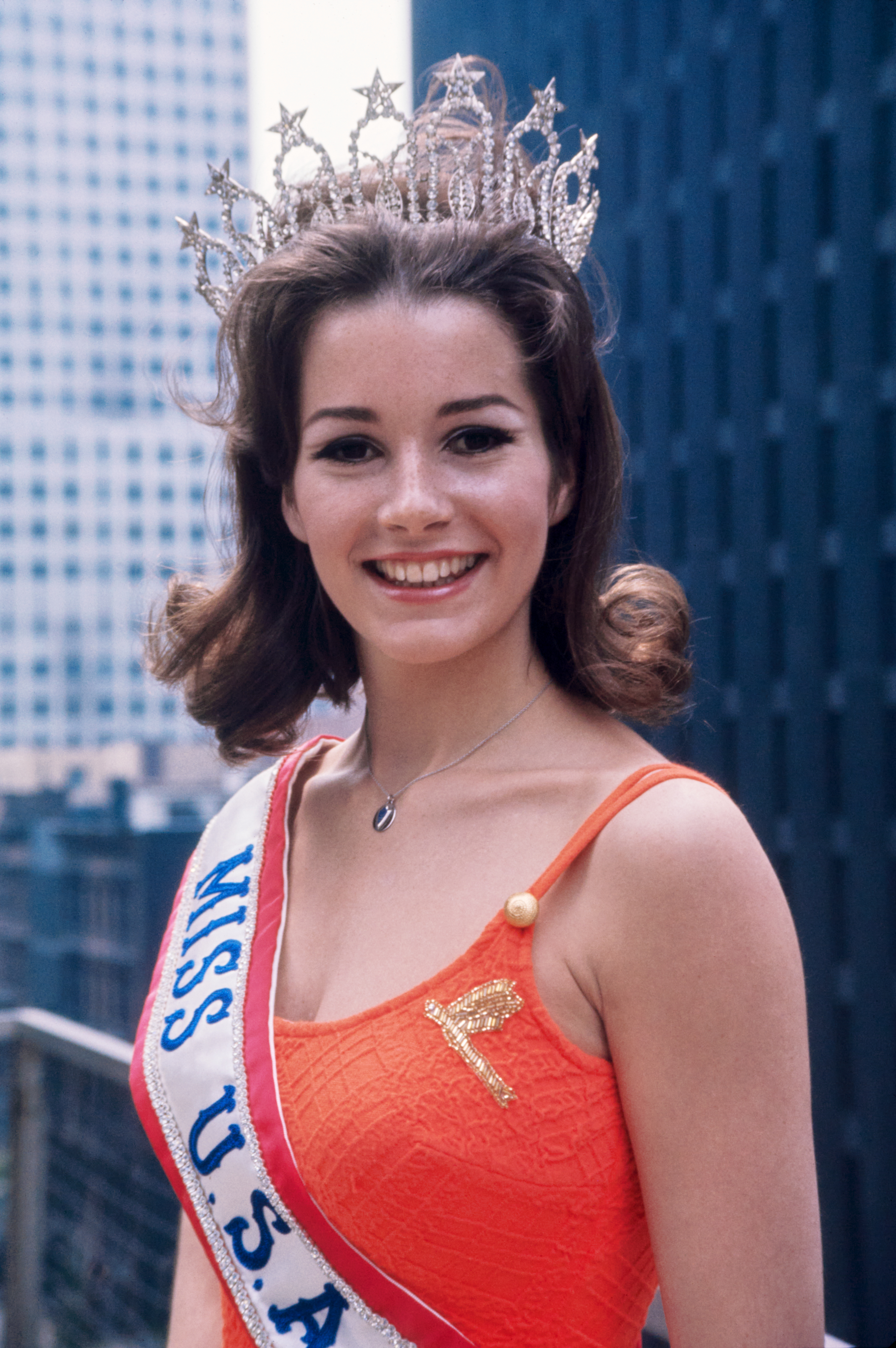
- Dorothy Anstett as Miss USA 1968
- Date: May 18, 1968
- Presenters: Bob Barker
- Venue: Miami Beach, Florida
- Broadcaster: CBS, WTVJ
- Entrants: 51
- Placements: 15
- Winner: Dorothy "Didi" Anstett (Washington (state)) Washington
- Congeniality: Julia Pinkley; Kentucky
- Photogenic: Kathy Hebert; Louisiana

Miss USA 1968 was the 17th Miss USA pageant, televised live by CBS from Miami Beach, Florida on May 18, 1968 hosted by Bob Barker.

The pageant was won by Dorothy "Didi" Anstett of Washington, who was crowned by outgoing titleholder Cheryl Patton of Florida. Anstett was the first – and to date only – woman from Washington to win the Miss USA title, and went on to place as 4th runner-up at Miss Universe 1968.

== Results ==
=== Placements ===
Final results	Contestant
Miss USA 1968	(Washington (state)) Washington − Dorothy "Didi" Anstett
1st Runner-Up	Maryland - Paulette Reck
2nd Runner-Up	Nevada - Kathy Landry
3rd Runner-Up	Louisiana - Kathy Hebert
4th Runner-Up	New Mexico - Bonnie Tafoya

=== Special awards ===
Award	Contestant(s)
Miss Amity (Congeniality)	Kentucky – Julia Pinkley
Miss Pixable (Photogenic)	Louisiana – Kathy Hebert
Best State Costume	California – Suzanne Fromm
Top 15 Best in Swimsuit	Alabama– Claudia Robinson; Arizona – Shirley Sprague; Arkansas – Ann Smithwick; California – Suzanne Fromm; Connecticut – Janice Shilinsky; Hawaii – Carol Seymour; Illinois – Sandra "Sandie" Wolsfeld; Louisiana - Kathy Hebert; Maryland - Paulette Reck; Michigan − Virginia Clift; Nevada – Kathy Landry; New Mexico – Bonnie Tafoya; Tennessee – Sandra Force; Virginia − Laurie Burke; (Washington (state)) Washington − Dorothy "Didi" Anstett

== Delegates ==
The Miss USA 1968 delegates were:

- Alabama – Claudia Robinson
- Alaska – Sharon Joy Long
- Arizona – Shirley Sprague
- Arkansas – Ann Smithwick
- California - Suzanne Fromm
- Colorado – Ann Bell
- Connecticut – Janice Shilinsky
- Delaware – Diane Parker
- (Washington, D.C.) District of Columbia – Diane Mothershead
- Florida – Leslie Candace "Candy" Bauer
- (Georgia (U.S. state)) Georgia – Midge Ivie
- Hawaii – Carol Seymour
- Idaho – Anna Maria Evensen
- Illinois – Sandra "Sandie" Wolsfeld
- Indiana – Nikki Peck
- Iowa – Markie Anderson
- Kansas – Anne Layton
- Kentucky – Julia Pinkley
- Louisiana – Kathy Hebert
- Maine – Cheryl Campbell
- Maryland – Paulette Reck
- Massachusetts – Sonja Fritz
- Michigan – Virginia Clift
- Minnesota – Arlene Larson
- Mississippi – Brenda Conerly
- Missouri – Jan Mary Barton
- Montana – Kerry Barker
- Nebraska – Linda J. Dresher
- Nevada – Kathy Landry
- New Hampshire – Deborah Steers
- New Jersey – Linda Papa
- New Mexico – Bonnie Tafoya
- (New York (state)) New York – June West
- North Carolina – Kelli Moore
- North Dakota – Virginia Lee Hanson
- Ohio – Linda Hoyle
- Oklahoma – Linda Bertozzi
- Oregon – Marjean Langley
- Pennsylvania – Barbara Verlander
- Rhode Island – Betty Lou Whitmore
- South Carolina – Kathryn Knoy
- South Dakota – Ann McKay
- Tennessee – Sandra Force
- Texas – Jeannie Wilson
- Utah – Shelle Cannon
- Vermont – Susan "Sue" Glynn
- Virginia – Laurie Burke
- (Washington (state)) Washington – Dorothy "Didi" Anstett
- West Virginia – Patricia "Pat" Coyne
- Wisconsin – Marilyn Kay Brahmsteadt
- Wyoming – Penny Smathers
