= Sandra Force =

American model, teacher, and flight attendant

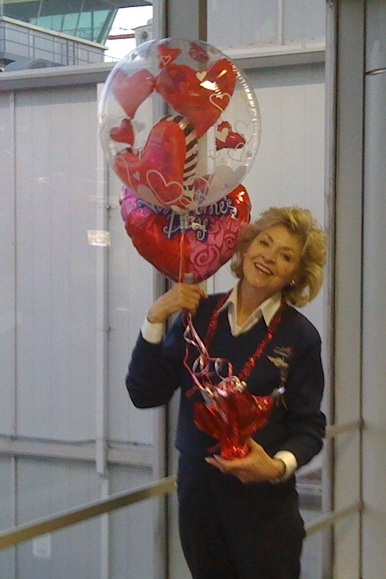
- Born: 1944 or 1945 (age 81–82)
- Beauty pageant titleholder
- Title: Miss Tennessee USA 1968
- Major competition: Miss USA 1968

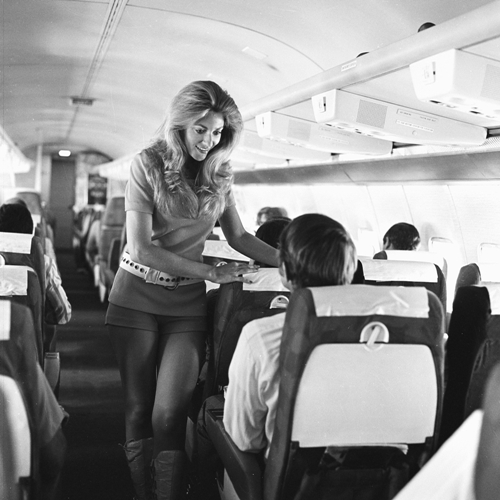
Sandra Force at work

Sandra Force is a flight attendant and former elementary school teacher who won the Miss Tennessee USA pageant in 1968.

Originally from Memphis, Tennessee, Force represented Tennessee in the Miss USA 1968 pageant held in Miami Beach, Florida. She placed in the semi-finals for the national title. Force graduated from Mississippi College in 1968 with a bachelor's degree in art and education then moved to Dallas, Texas.

Force left her job as a Dallas school teacher in 1971 to join Southwest Airlines as one of its original flight attendants. She appeared on the cover of Esquire Magazine in February 1974. As of February 2014, Force was one of five original flight attendants still working for Southwest.

Awards and achievements
Preceded by Nancy Brackhahn	Miss Tennessee USA; 1968	Succeeded by Suzie Richardson
