= Rachel Smith =

American model, actress and TV host

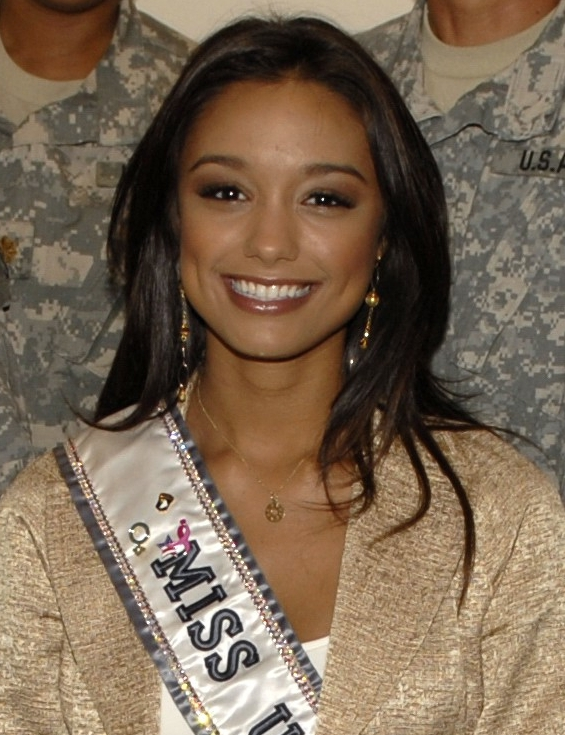
- Rachel Smith at Miss USA 2007
- Born: Rachel Renee Smith; April 18, 1985 (age 41); Panama City, Panama
- Education: Belmont University, (BS)
- Height: 180 cm (5 ft 11 in)
- Spouse: Mike Weed (m. 2021)
- Beauty pageant titleholder
- Title: Miss Tennessee Teen USA 2002; Miss Tennessee USA 2007; Miss USA 2007
- Agency: Greenwood Productions (State Titles); Miss Universe Organization (National Title)
- Hair color: Brown
- Eye color: Dark Brown
- Major competitions: Miss Tennessee Teen USA 2002; (Winner) Miss Teen USA 2002; (Top 10); Miss Tennessee USA 2007; (Winner); Miss USA 2007; (Winner); Miss Universe 2007; (4th Runner-Up)

Rachel Renee Smith (born April 18, 1985) is an American actress, television host, model, and beauty pageant titleholder who won the Miss USA 2007 pageant and who previously had competed in the Miss Teen USA 2002 pageant. She represented the United States at Miss Universe 2007 and placed 4th Runner-Up.

== Early life ==
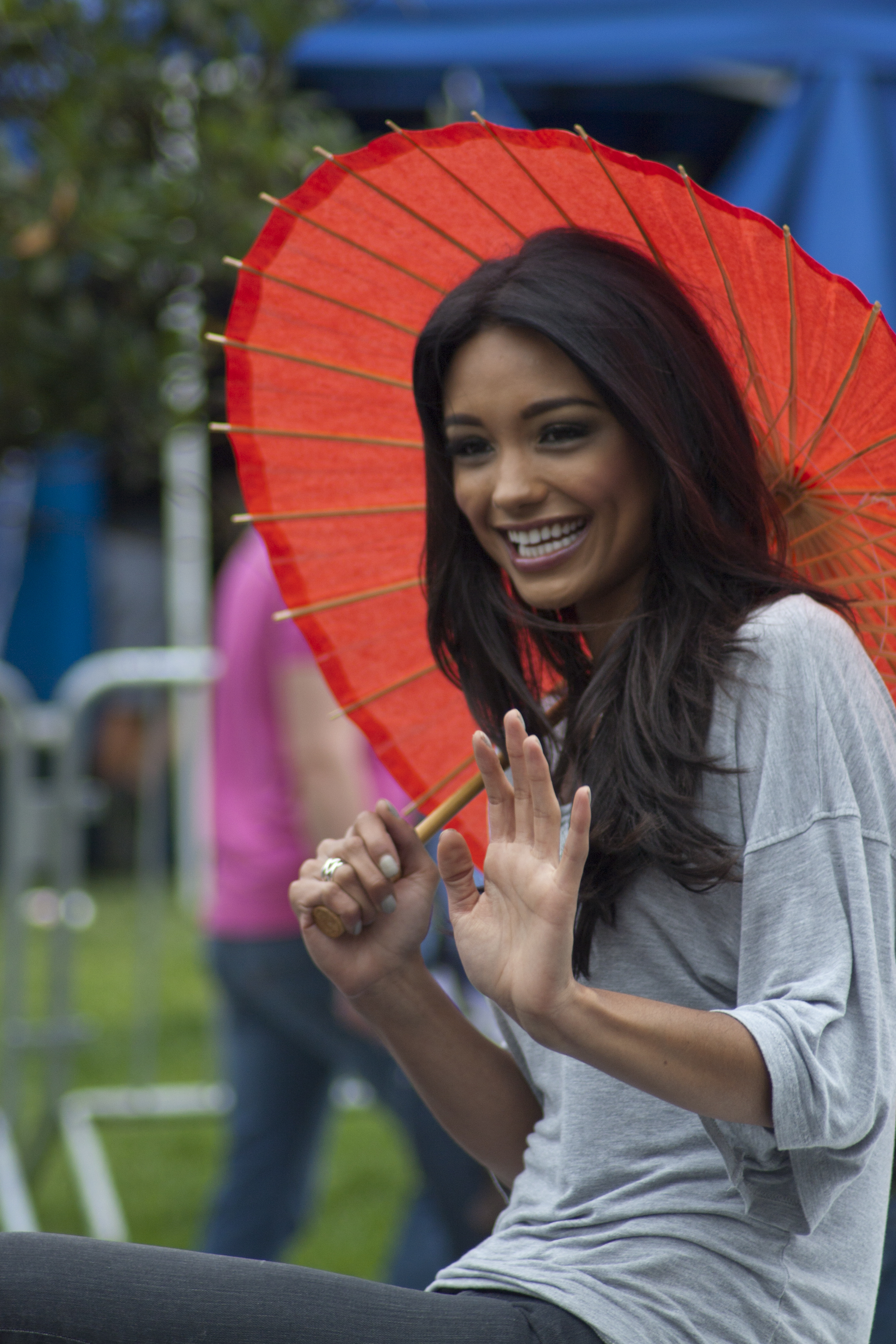
Rachel Smith at Los Angeles Pride 2011

Smith was born on a U.S. Army base in Panama. She lived in Clarksville, TN after her parents were stationed at Fort Campbell. She attended Clarksville Academy and graduated from Davidson Academy for high school.

Smith graduated magna cum laude from Belmont University in Nashville, Tennessee in 2006 with a Bachelor of Science in journalism. Smith graduated a semester early, in December 2006. She received a full tuition scholarship to attend Belmont due to her community service activities and academic achievements throughout high school. While she was at Belmont, she interned for eight months with Chicago-based Harpo Productions, a company owned by Oprah Winfrey. In January 2007, it was announced that she had been chosen by Winfrey to volunteer for one month at her Leadership Academy for Girls.

== Pageantry ==
=== Cinderella Scholarship Program ===
In 1993, Smith competed in the Miniature Miss Division at the Cinderella International Pageant, representing Tennessee. She was later crowned the 1993 International Miniature Miss.

=== Miss Tennessee Teen USA 2002 ===
Smith won her first major pageant title in 2001 when she was crowned Miss Tennessee Teen USA 2002. This was her second attempt at the title, having placed third runner-up to Jessica Myers the previous year. Smith then competed in the nationally televised Miss Teen USA 2002 pageant at South Padre Island, Texas, where she placed in the top ten and won the Miss Photogenic award. Of the semi-finalists, Smith placed tenth in the swimsuit competition and seventh in evening gown, finishing ninth on average. The pageant was won by Vanessa Semrow of Wisconsin.

=== Miss Tennessee USA 2007 ===
On October 7, 2006, Smith became the fourth former Miss Tennessee Teen USA to win the Miss Tennessee USA title, following Molly Brown who held the 1984 teen and 1987 Miss titles, Lynnette Cole who held the 1995 teen and 2000 Miss titles and won Miss USA 2000 and Allison Alderson, who held the 1994 teen title and 2002 Miss title. She won the title in a state pageant held at Austin Peay State University in her home town of Clarksville.

Smith is one of three delegates who placed in the final six in the Miss Tennessee Teen USA 2002 pageant to later win consecutive Miss Tennessee USA crowns, after Amy Colley won the title in 2005 and Lauren Grissom won it in 2006. A fourth member of that top six was Brittany Swann, who placed second runner-up. One month after Smith won her title, Swann won the Miss Georgia USA 2007 title, and both competed against each other at the Miss USA 2007 pageant. Swann and Smith have the same directors, Greenwood Productions, which produce the Tennessee and Georgia state pageants.

=== Miss USA 2007 ===
Smith represented Tennessee in the Miss USA 2007 pageant on March 23, 2007, at the Kodak Theatre in Los Angeles, California, where she became the second titleholder from Tennessee to win the Miss USA crown. Smith won both the swimsuit and evening gown competitions with consistently high scores. She was crowned by titleholder Tara Conner alongside whom she competed at Miss Teen USA 2002. Smith is the third consecutive former Miss Teen USA delegate to win the title.

=== Miss Universe 2007 ===
As Miss USA, Smith represented the United States in the Miss Universe 2007 pageant held in Mexico City, Mexico, on May 28, 2007. She arrived in Mexico on May 1, and along with the 77 other delegates participated in weeks of events, rehearsals and preliminary competitions prior to the final telecast. On May 20, Smith competed in the national costume competition dressed as Elvis Presley, a costume which reflected her home state of Tennessee. During her appearance she was loudly booed by the Mexican crowd, who were seen giving Smith the thumbs-down sign.

After competing in the preliminary competition, Smith made the top 15 during the pageant finals, where she placed sixth in swimsuit and advanced to the top ten. During the evening gown competition, Smith slipped and fell down before quickly getting back onto her feet. She maintained composure as she finished her walk, and advanced to the top 5 despite the fall.

Smith was again booed by the Mexican crowd after she was announced as part of the top five while the local representative from Mexico was not. This continued as Smith answered her final question, finishing by thanking the crowd in Spanish, which finally made the crowd cheer. She eventually placed fourth runner-up, equaling the placement of her predecessor Tara Conner at Miss Universe 2006. The booing and jeering during the pageant was a repeat of a similar incident during Miss Universe 1993, also held in Mexico City, when Miss USA Kenya Moore was loudly booed. The audience reaction was attributed to political issues between the two nations. In August 2007, Mexican tourism officials apologized for the behavior of the audience and said that Smith is welcome back in Mexico any time.

== Reign as Miss USA ==
During her first week as Miss USA, Smith made a number of media appearances, such as The Today Show and Late Show with David Letterman, where she presented a "top ten" list entitled "Top Ten Things I Can Say Now That I'm Miss USA". She was also a guest on The Oprah Winfrey Show where she talked about her experience working as an intern. As Miss USA, Smith twice had the opportunity to ring the opening bell at the American Stock Exchange, first on April 24, and then on June 7 with Miss Universe Riyo Mori.

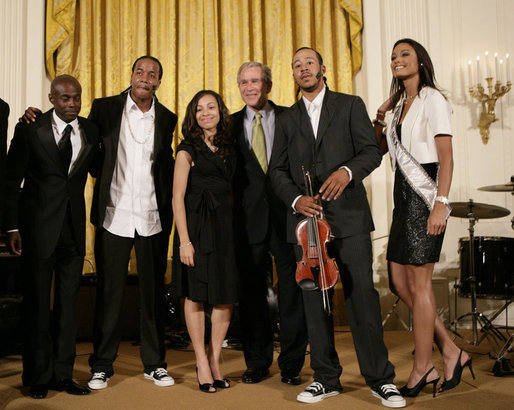
Following a Black Music Month event at the White House, Smith and other entertainers are thanked by President George W. Bush

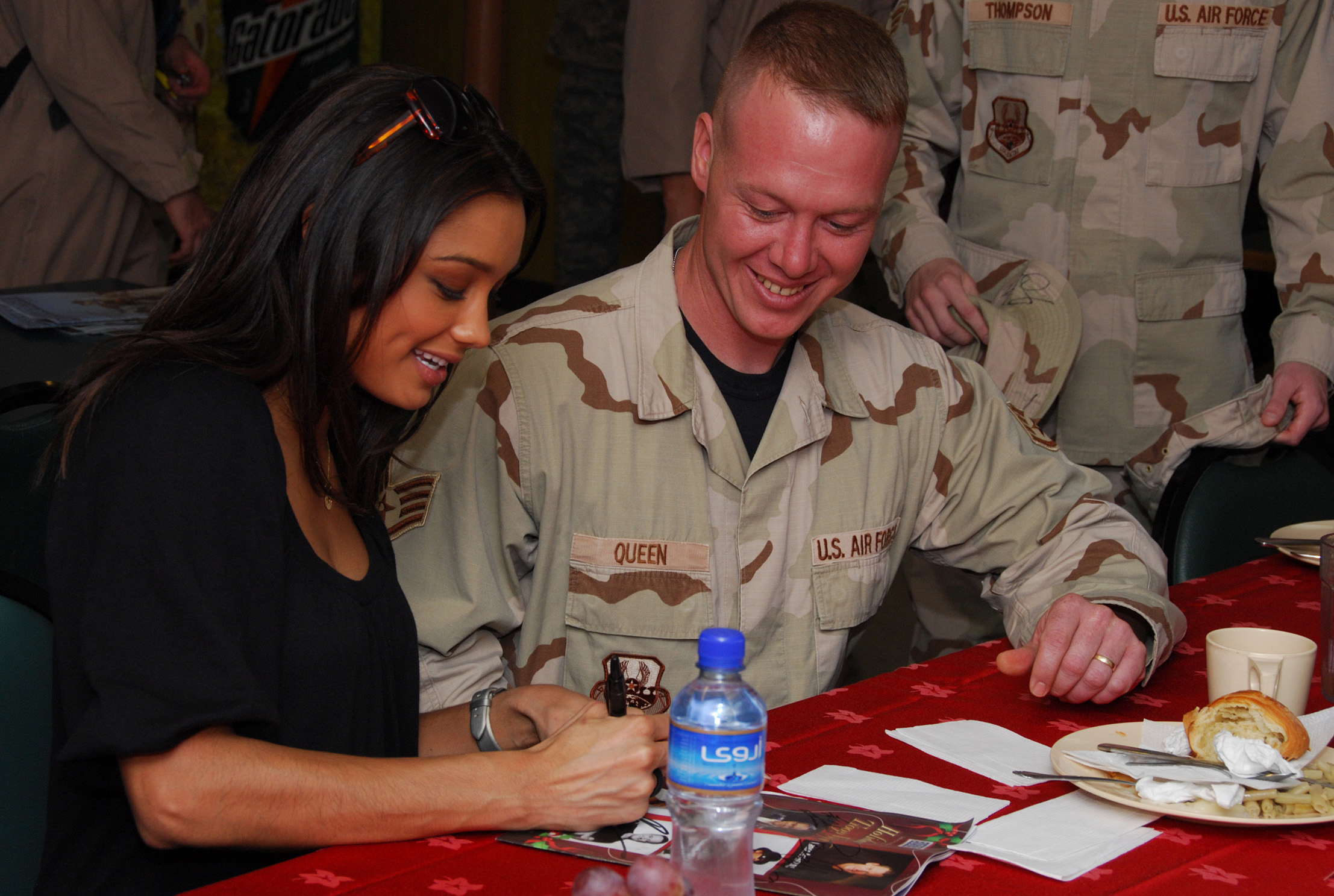
USO tour

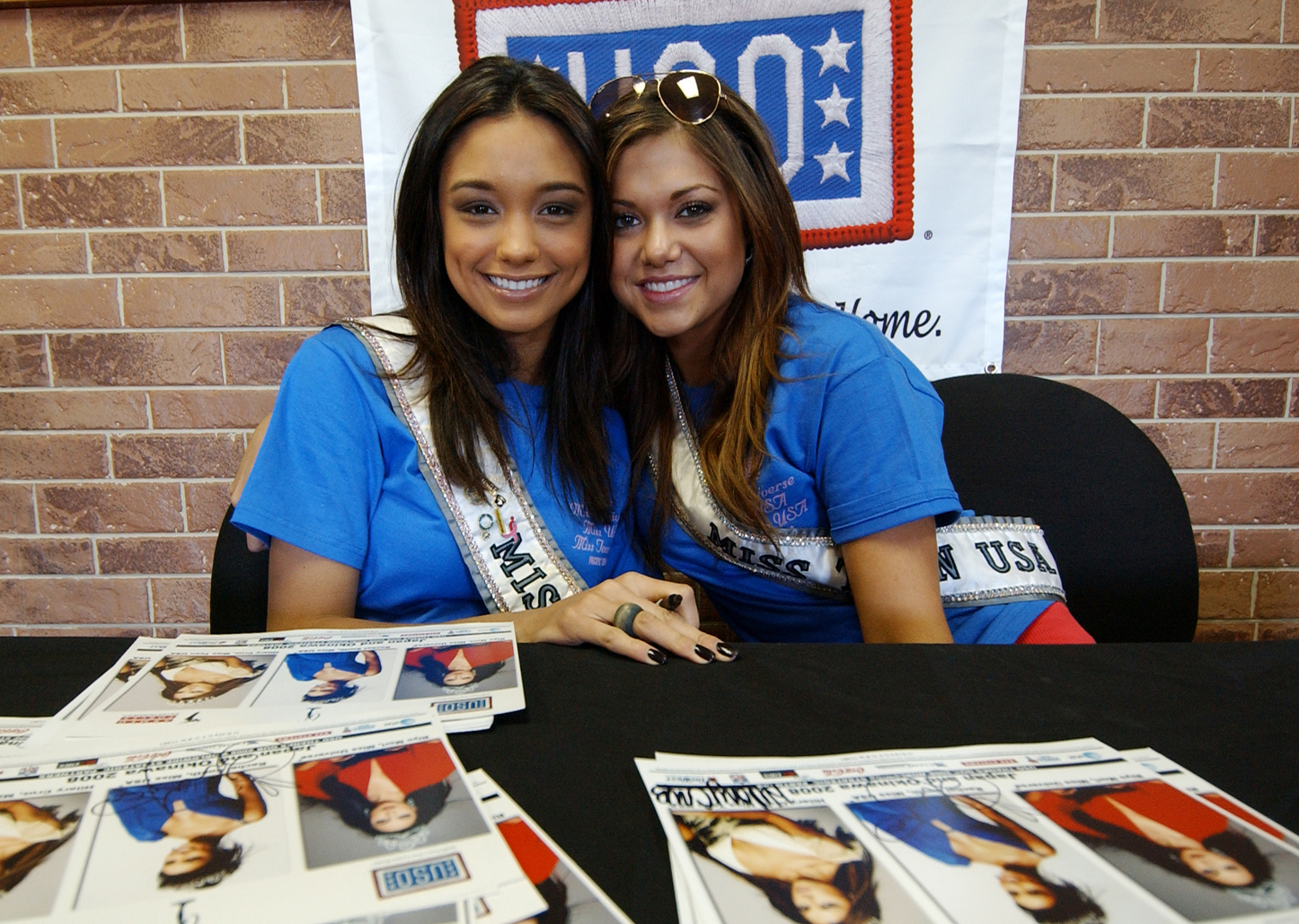
Smith and Hilary Cruz signing autographs at Kadena Air Base in Japan

In early June, Smith travelled to Kenya to volunteer for Project Sunshine. On returning to the United States, she was present at an event at the White House celebrating Black Music month, where she introduced President George W. Bush to the audience. She then travelled to Chicago to attend the CONCACAF Gold Cup final between Mexico and the United States, which led to further discussion in the media over the treatment she received from the Mexican audience at Miss Universe. In late November, she rode a float in the 2007 Macy's Thanksgiving Day Parade, following previous Miss USA titleholders since Susie Castillo in 2003. In December 2007, she traveled to Kuwait, Iraq and Naval Station Rota Spain on a USO tour along with Kid Rock, Robin Williams, Lewis Black and Lance Armstrong.

Smith appeared on the cover and in an editorial spread in the March/April 2008 issue of Supermodels Unlimited magazine. On April 11, 2008, Smith crowned Crystle Stewart, Miss Texas, as Miss USA 2008 in Las Vegas, Nevada. This was the first time that two women of African American descent had been crowned Miss USA consecutively. Smith appeared on the magazine cover and in an interview for the May/June 2011 issue of Select Magazine.

== Television ==
Smith starred in Donald Trump's MTV reality show Pageant Place along with Riyo Mori (Miss Universe 2007), Tara Conner (former Miss USA 2006), Katie Blair (former Miss Teen USA 2006) and Hilary Cruz (Miss Teen USA 2007). The show was first broadcast on October 10, 2007. In August 2010, she appeared on a special "Girls of Summer" week airing of NBC's Minute to Win It on an episode called "Last Beauty Standing." The episode featured 10 beauty pageant winners competing for $100,000 towards their chosen charities along with a chance to win a $1,000,000 challenge.

She worked as a reporter for E!, but formerly co-hosts ABC's nationally syndicated entertainment show OnTheRedCarpet. She is the former "pop news" correspondent on the Saturday telecast of Good Morning America. She is the co-host of Amazon's Style Code.

From 2019 to 2025, Smith was a New York-based correspondent for ET. Smith served as a guest correspondent for ET, where she's interviewed the likes of Rihanna, Ryan Seacrest, Kelly Ripa, Kim Kardashian, Dua Lipa, Katy Perry, Luke Bryan and Lionel Richie. Smith co-hosts New Year's Eve Live: Nashville's Big Bash with Bobby Bones on CBS.

Awards and achievements
Preceded by (United States) Tara Conner	Miss Universe 4th runner-up 2007	Succeeded by (Mexico) Elisa Nájera
Preceded by Tara Conner	Miss USA; 2007	Succeeded by Crystle Stewart
Preceded by Lauren Grissom	Miss Tennessee USA; 2007	Succeeded by Hailey Brown
Preceded by Jessica Myers	Miss Tennessee Teen USA; 2002	Succeeded by Alicia Selby
