= David Booth (ice hockey) =

American ice hockey player (born 1984)

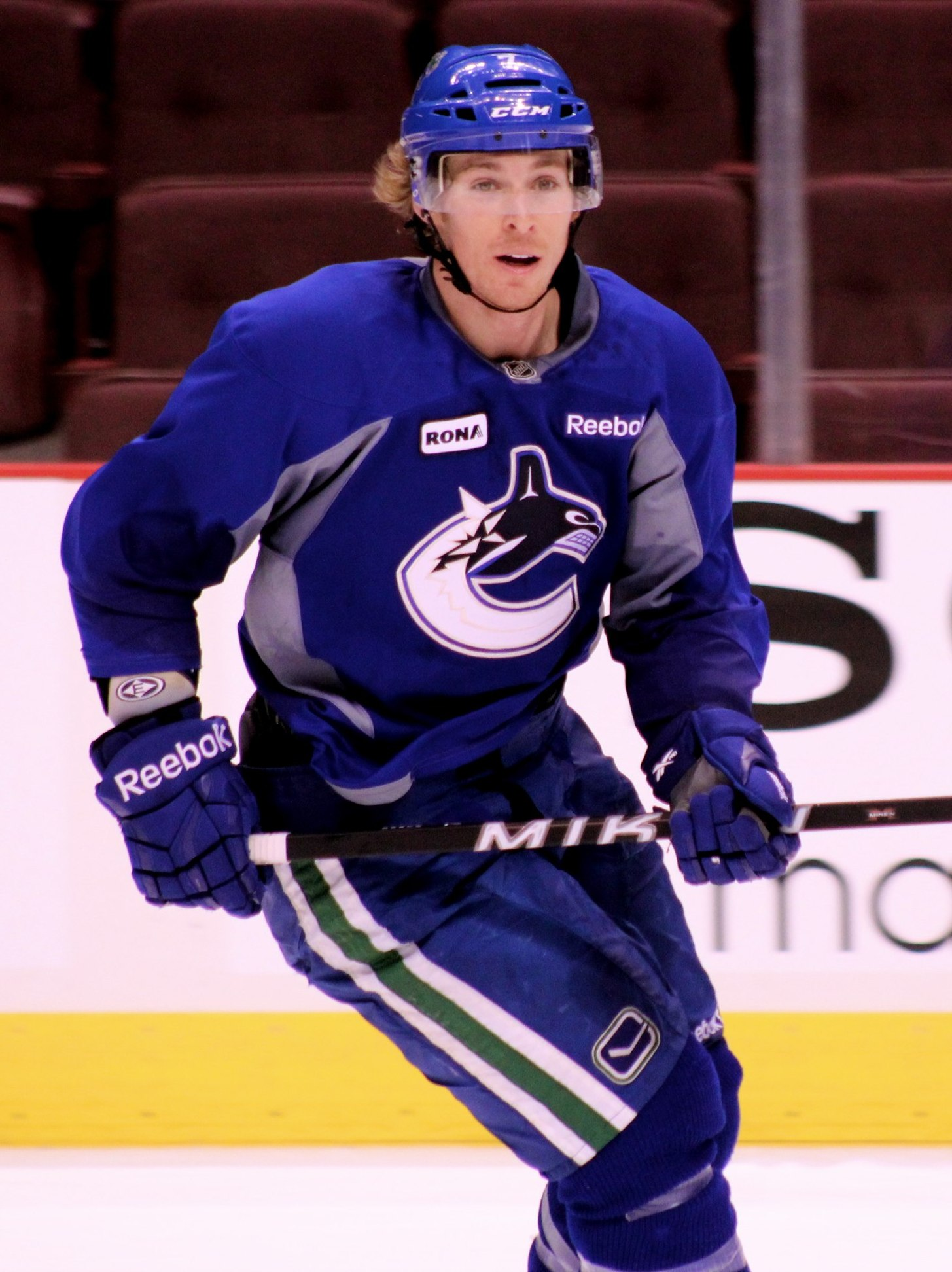
- Booth with the Vancouver Canucks in 2012
- Born: November 24, 1984 (age 41) Detroit, Michigan, U.S.
- Height: 6 ft 0 in (183 cm)
- Weight: 212 lb (96 kg; 15 st 2 lb)
- Position: Left/right wing
- Shoots: Left
- AIHL team Former teams: Melbourne Ice; Florida Panthers; Vancouver Canucks; Toronto Maple Leafs; Admiral Vladivostok; Avangard Omsk; Detroit Red Wings; Dinamo Minsk; Manglerud Star; Vålerenga Ishockey; Storhamar Hockey; Ferencvárosi TC; Fife Flyers
- National team: United States
- NHL draft: 53rd overall, 2004; Florida Panthers
- Playing career: 2006–present

David Jonathan Booth (born November 24, 1984) is an American professional ice hockey player. He is a forward currently playing for the Melbourne Ice of the Australian Ice Hockey League.

Following his second year with the Michigan State Spartans, he was selected 53rd overall by the Florida Panthers in the 2004 NHL entry draft. He spent four years playing college hockey before turning professional with the Panthers organization in 2006–07. After recording career-highs in goals, assists and points, as well as being voted the Panthers' most valuable player by the team's fans in 2008–09, he suffered two concussions the following season. Midway through his sixth year in the league, Booth was traded to the Vancouver Canucks in a four-player deal.

Known as an offensive forward and a fast skater, Booth has reached the 30-goal plateau once in his NHL career. Representing the United States in international competition, he has won gold medals at the 2002 IIHF World U18 and 2004 IIHF World U20 Championships. He has also competed in the 2008 IIHF World Championship.

== Playing career ==
=== Amateur career ===
After playing minor hockey with the Fraser Falcons, then the Detroit Honeybaked of the Midwest Elite Hockey League, Booth moved on to the Junior A level with the Detroit Compuware Ambassadors of the North American Hockey League (NAHL). He recorded 30 points (17 goals and 13 assists) over 42 games in 2000–01, earning him NAHL All-Rookie Team and Rookie of the Year honors. The following season, he joined the United States National Team Development Program and competed for their junior and under-18 teams in the United States Hockey League (USHL) and NAHL, respectively.

During his time with the Development Program, he committed to an athletic scholarship with the Michigan State Spartans of the Central Collegiate Hockey Association (CCHA). Joining the Spartans in 2002–03, he recorded 36 points (17 goals and 19 assists) over 39 games, ranking fourth in team scoring and 13th in the CCHA overall. His freshman year included two CCHA Rookie of the Week distinctions and a hat-trick, recorded on January 10, 2003, in a 5–2 win against the Alaska Nanooks. His efforts as a freshman earned him Spartans Rookie of the Year and CCHA All-Rookie Team honors. Although Booth was eligible for the 2003 NHL entry draft, National Collegiate Athletic Association (NCAA) rules stipulated that players under the age of 19 could not opt into the draft without foregoing their college eligibility.

Early the following season, Booth sustained a knee injury that forced him out of the lineup for several games. He finished his sophomore year with 18 points (eight goals and ten assists) over 30 contests. Despite his decreased offensive production, he remained highly ranked by the NHL Central Scouting Bureau (CSB) at the end of the season for the upcoming 2004 NHL entry draft. He was listed at 27th among skaters playing in North America by the CSB, while The Hockey News ranked him 33rd overall. During the draft, Booth was selected in the second round, 53rd overall, by the Florida Panthers. He was scouted as a player with size and toughness, while a USA Today article declared that he "would have gone much higher if he opted into the draft [the previous] season."

Following his draft, Booth returned to Michigan State to complete his four-year tenure with the school. During his junior year, (Note: In this instance, "junior" refers to Booth's second college year, as opposed to the junior level of play for under-20 players.) he and teammate Bryan Lerg set a Spartans record for the fastest two goals scored in a game (five seconds apart). Their goals came in a 6–5 overtime loss to the Alaska Nanooks in February 2005 and surpassed the previous record by one second. (Note: The previous record was set by Bruce Rendall and Bill Shibicky versus the Ohio State Buckeyes on February 21, 1987).) Later that month, Booth sustained a cracked rib and was sidelined for several games. He finished the 2004–05 season with 16 points (seven goals and nine assists) over 29 contests.

In the first month of his senior year, Booth played in his 100th career college game in a contest against the North Dakota Fighting Sioux on October 16, 2005. He recorded a shorthand goal in a 3–0 win. Booth later missed some playing time due to injury before returning to the lineup in late-November 2005. After struggling to score in the first half of the 2005–06 season (he recorded nine points in the first three months), Booth finished with 35 points (13 goals and 22 assists) over 37 games. His strong offensive production in the second half included an 11-game point-scoring streak that was broken on the last regular season game against the Miami RedHawks. In the 2006 CCHA playoffs, Booth helped the Spartans to a Mason Cup as league champions. Facing the Miami RedHawks in the final, Booth scored the game-winning goal six minutes in the second period, securing a 2–1 win for Michigan State. Moving on to the 2006 NCAA Tournament, they were eliminated in the regional final by the Maine Black Bears 5–4. Booth scored a goal and an assist in the losing effort. Over four years with the Spartans, Booth finished his college career with 105 points in 134 games.

=== Florida Panthers (2006–2011) ===
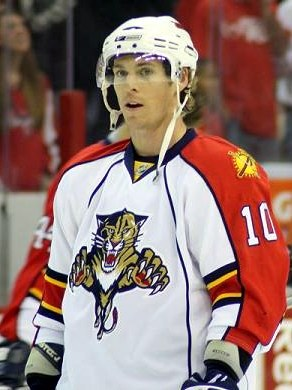
Booth during his tenure with the Panthers in February 2009

On July 20, 2006, Booth signed with the Panthers. Joining the organization, he was assigned to the Panthers' American Hockey League (AHL) affiliate, the Rochester Americans, to start the 2006–07 season. Within two months, he was called up to the Panthers on November 20. Making his NHL debut that night against the Boston Bruins, he registered 11-and-a-half minutes of ice time in a 3–2 win. After being returned to the AHL six days later, he received another call-up the following month. During his second stint with the team, he recorded his first NHL point on December 12 against the Anaheim Ducks. Booth drew the first assist on the game's first goal by Drew Larman; the Panthers went on to lose 5–4. Sent back down to Rochester and recalled one more time in December, he remained with the team for the remainder of the campaign. Booth later scored his first NHL goal on January 4, 2007, against Jamie McLennan in a 5–4 overtime loss to the Calgary Flames. In the final month of the season, he registered his first game-winning goal in the NHL on April 6 in a 7–2 win against the Tampa Bay Lightning. Booth completed his rookie season with 10 points (3 goals and 7 assists) over 48 NHL games, while also recording 14 points (seven goals and seven assists) over 25 AHL games. As the Panthers failed to qualify for the 2007 playoffs, ranking 12th in the Eastern Conference, (Note: The top eight teams in each conference qualify for the playoffs.) Booth was returned to the AHL for the Americans' post-season. He recorded two assists over six playoff games as Rochester was eliminated in the first round by the Hamilton Bulldogs.

Early in the 2007–08 season, Booth was injured after receiving a check from behind during a game against the Ottawa Senators on October 20, 2007. While playing the puck, he collided with Senators defenceman Anton Volchenkov, causing his head to hit the boards. Volchenkov received a five-minute major penalty and a game misconduct on the play, while Booth was taken off the ice in a stretcher. He was brought to an Ottawa hospital for precautionary measures and returned home the same night with a sore neck. While a suspension for Volchenkov was suggested in the media following the game, the league chose not to hold a hearing regarding the incident. Senators head coach John Paddock was quick to dismiss the notion of a suspension, asserting that Booth turned into Volchenkov, as opposed to the Senators defenceman forcefully initiating contact. Booth missed one game due to the injury. Later in the campaign, he missed eight games with a knee injury. Missing nine games total, he recorded 40 points (22 goals and 18 assists) over 73 contests, ranking fourth in team scoring. Becoming an integral part of the Panthers' lineup, he also led the team with six game-winning goals. As a team, the Panthers remained out of the playoffs in 2008, finishing 11th in the East.

The following season, Booth recorded his first career NHL natural hat trick against the Anaheim Ducks on November 9, 2008. He scored all the Panthers goals against Jean-Sébastien Giguère in a 3–1 win over the Anaheim Ducks. The following month, he sustained a left shoulder injury that sidelined him for eight games. After returning, he began an eight-game point-scoring streak that lasted from December 27, 2008, to January 10, 2009. Later in the season, he recorded another hat trick in a contest against the St. Louis Blues on March 7, 2009. Scoring all three goals against Chris Mason, Booth helped the Panthers to a 5–3 win. His efforts made him the fourth player in team history to register two hat-tricks in one season, after Pavel Bure, Ray Sheppard and Olli Jokinen. He also added an assist for a four-point game. Booth bettered that single-game total during the last contest of the regular season, scoring two goals and three assists for a personal best five-point effort in a 7–4 win against the Washington Capitals on April 11, 2009. Booth finished the season with career-highs of 31 goals, 29 assists and 60 points over 72 games. While leading the Panthers in goals, powerplay goals (11), game-winning goals (5); tied with Nathan Horton, and shots (246), he finished one point behind team-leader Stephen Weiss (who played six more games than Booth). Booth's efforts helped the Panthers compete for a playoff spot late in the season for the first time in his tenure with the club. They finished the season tied for the eighth and final playoff spot in the East with the Montreal Canadiens at 41 wins and 93 points each. The Canadiens earned the spot over the Panthers by virtue of having won the season series between the two teams.

During his breakout season, Booth became a favorite among team followers; home fans at BankAtlantic Center were known to cheer "Booooth" when he touched the puck during games. At the end of the campaign, he was chosen by the fans as the team's most valuable player in an official online vote. Set to become a restricted free agent in the off-season, Booth was tendered a qualifying offer by the Panthers on June 29, 2009. Two days later, he signed a six-year, US$25.5 million contract. Upon announcing the contract, Panthers General Manager Randy Sexton heralded Booth as "undoubtedly an important part of [the] club's future...[and] a role model for other players," while embodying "every attribute of what a true Panthers player stands for."

During the first month of the 2009–10 season, Booth sustained a concussion after being hit by Philadelphia Flyers forward Mike Richards during a game on October 24, 2009. Skating up to the Flyers' blueline, Booth had shot the puck into the offensive zone when Richards hit him in the head with his shoulder. Rendered unconscious, Booth was taken off the ice on a stretcher and brought to a Philadelphia hospital. In addition to his concussion, he sustained a cut above one eye that required stitches; he was released from hospital the next day. While Richards received a five-minute major penalty for interference and a game misconduct for intent to injure, he was not suspended for the play. The decision not to further penalize Richards proved to be a highly contentious issue. Panthers General Manager Randy Sexton and defenceman Keith Ballard voiced their opinion that Richards' hit was directed at the head while knowing Booth was in a vulnerable position, warranting a suspension. The Flyers captain expressed concern for Booth's health both in the media and to Panthers Head Coach Peter DeBoer personally, but asserted that he was not intending to hurt him. Another concern was the timing of Richards' hit, as Booth had already released the puck. In response, NHL Vice President Bill Daly explained that the hit was not late enough to justify a suspension.

Booth was not cleared for full-contact practice with the team until January 25, 2010. Six days later, he returned to the lineup for a game against the New York Islanders after being sidelined for 45 contests. During his absence, the Panthers and Flyers played each other on December 21, 2009, for the first time since Richards' hit. The game included four fights, including one between Panthers defenceman and captain Bryan McCabe and Richards. The teams met again with Booth in the lineup on March 3, 2010. After fighting Richards in the first period (one of four fights in the game and Booth's first in the NHL), Booth scored a goal and three assists (completing a Gordie Howe hat trick) to help the Panthers to a 7–4 win.

Although the NHL had not suspended Richards for his actions against Booth, the incident was instrumental in the League's newfound efforts to eliminate hits to the head, particularly against players who cannot see the oncoming checker approaching (as was the case with Booth). Several months after Booth's October 2009 concussion, Boston Bruins forward Marc Savard was hit by Matt Cooke in a similar fashion on March 7. Later that month, on March 25, the NHL Board of Governors and NHL Players' Association's executive board voted in favour of a rule penalizing "blindside hits" (bodychecking a player after having skated laterally towards him undetected, an idea similar to one's "blind spot" while driving). That same night, Booth suffered his second concussion in five months during a game against the Montreal Canadiens. While reaching back to retrieve a loose puck, Booth was hit in the head by opposing defenceman Jaroslav Špaček's shoulder. No penalty was called on the play, while Booth was helped off the ice and taken to hospital. The hit did not receive suspension and did not spark controversy as Booth's previous concussion had. Following the game, Panthers forward Nathan Horton asserted that "It wasn't a dirty hit"; Špaček expressed concern for Booth, but explained that "when he turned I was standing right there and basically he just ran at me." Sidelined for the remaining nine games of the season, Booth finished the campaign with 16 points (eight goals and eight assists) over 28 games. After pushing for a playoff spot the previous season, the Panthers ranked second-worst in the East with 32 wins and 77 points.

While Booth's hockey-playing future was initially in doubt following his second concussion, he returned for the 2010–11 season and played all 82 games. Averaging 19 minutes of ice time per game (second among forward behind Weiss), he led the Panthers with 23 goals while ranking third with 40 points (behind Weiss and Mike Santorelli). With 280 shots, including a 14-shot effort against the Bruins on November 18, 2010, he led all Panthers' players and ranked 12th in the NHL overall. As a team, the Panthers continued to struggle and General Manager Dale Tallon began trading away many of their veteran players towards the end of the season; they finished with the worst record in the East.

=== Vancouver Canucks (2011–2014) ===
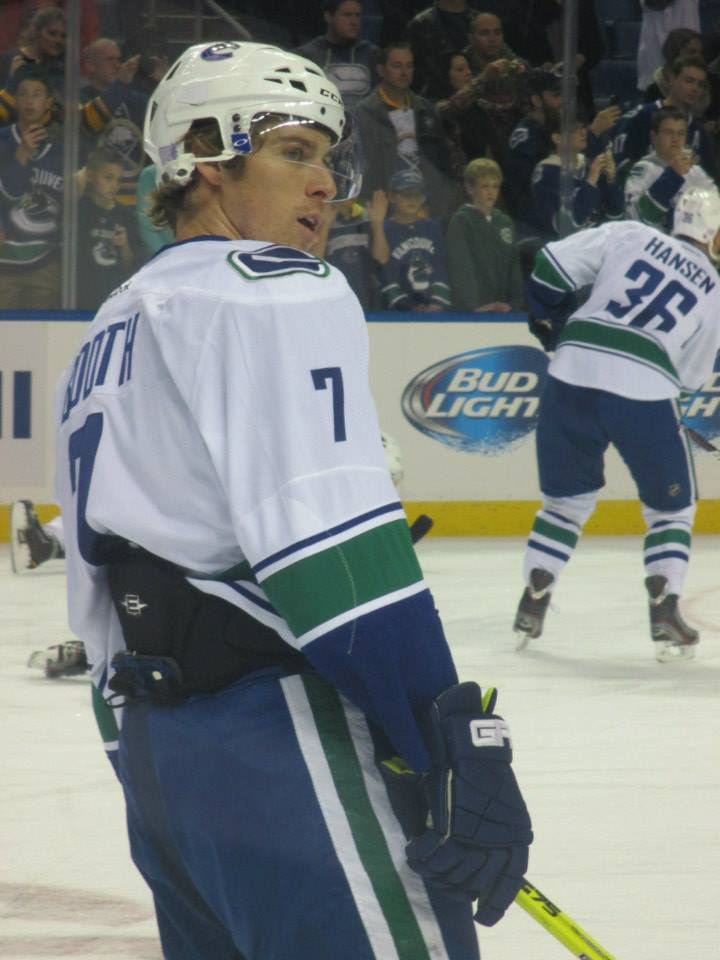
Booth with the Canucks in November 2013. The 2013–14 season was his third and final season with the Canucks

Less than a month into the 2011–12 season, Booth was traded to the Vancouver Canucks on October 22, 2011. The Panthers sent him, along with forward Steven Reinprecht and a third-round pick in the 2013 draft, to Vancouver in exchange for forwards Mikael Samuelsson and Marco Sturm. Tallon described the deal as a performance-based trade; Booth had registered one assist over the first six games of the season and had a team-worst –6 plus-minus rating while being demoted to the third line. Booth was saddened and admittedly surprised at the trade. Booth had also been reportedly sought after by Vancouver for six months prior; the team conferred with alternate captain Ryan Kesler regarding Booth's character on and off the ice (the two grew up playing minor and junior hockey together). Joining Vancouver, he switched his jersey number from 10 to 7, in honor of his younger sister, Rachael, who also wears the number as a hockey player. Playing on the second line with countrymen Ryan Kesler and Chris Higgins, Booth formed a component of a scoring unit was nicknamed the "American Express" line. Booth scored his first goal as a Canuck 15 days after the trade, opening the scoring in a 6–2 win against the Chicago Blackhawks on Blackhawks' goaltender Corey Crawford. The following month, Booth suffered a right medial collateral ligament (MCL) injury after a knee-on-knee hit from Colorado Avalanche forward Kevin Porter during a game on December 6, 2011. Porter received a five-minute major and game misconduct for the play, while a subsequent hearing with NHL disciplinarian Brendan Shanahan resulted in a four-game suspension. Booth was sidelined for 18 games over six weeks with the injury, returning in mid-January 2012. Booth finished the regular season with 16 goals, 14 goals and 30 points in 62 games to help the Canucks win a second consecutive Presidents' Trophy awarded to the best regular season team. Having never qualified for the playoffs with the Panthers previously in his career, Booth made his post-season debut in the first game of the first round of the 2012 playoffs on April 11, 2012 against the Los Angeles Kings. He recorded one assist over five games as the first-seeded and back-to-back Presidents' Trophy-winning Canucks were eliminated in the first round by the eighth-seeded and eventual Stanley Cup champion Kings. Booth told reporters prior to the playoffs that he was struggling with a diminished role with the Canucks, in comparison to his time with the Panthers, alluding to his ice time. The previous year while still with the Panthers, he was averaging nearly 19 minutes per game, which dropped to 15 minutes as a Canuck.

In subsequent seasons with the Canucks, Booth continued to struggle. His production dropped steeply, and he suffered several injuries during the lockout-shortened 2012–13 season, scoring a total of three points. Scoring a total of nine goals and 19 points in the following season, he had gone 32 games without a goal, but managed to score three in the final ten games of the season.

On June 17, 2014, the Canucks placed Booth on unconditional waivers, and the following day after he cleared waivers the Canucks used their final compliance buyout on him and Booth became an unrestricted free agent.

=== Later NHL years and KHL ===
On July 22, 2014, the Toronto Maple Leafs signed Booth to a one-year contract worth $1.1 million. He scored the only shootout goal in the first preseason game on September 22, 2014, which led the Toronto Maple Leafs to victory. Booth would break his foot shortly afterwards and miss the opening few months of the season.

On November 21, 2014, Booth was sent down to the Toronto Marlies of the AHL for a conditioning stint. He would finish with one goal in his two-game tour with the Marlies. On November 29, Booth played his first game as a Maple Leaf in a 6–2 win over the Washington Capitals. Booth recorded no points but enjoyed his first game in Toronto. However, Booth would record his first point as a Leaf three games later, an assist on a goal scored by line-mate Richard Pánik in a 5–2 victory over his former team, the Canucks. His first goal as a Maple Leaf would come on December 16, where he scored the game winner in a 6–2 victory over the Anaheim Ducks. Booth would finish the season with 13 points (7 goals, 6 assists) in 59 games.

As a free agent over the following summer, Booth agreed to a return to the Florida Panthers in accepting an invitation to training camp on a professional try-out contract on September 9, 2015. At the conclusion of camp and approaching pre-season, Booth was released by the Panthers. On November 26, 2015, Booth belatedly signed his first contract abroad, agreeing to a one-year deal with Russian club Admiral Vladivostok of the Kontinental Hockey League for the remainder of the 2015–16 season. In 23 games with Admiral, Booth contributed with 6 goals and 16 points.

Booth returned home during the off-season and signed a professional try-out contract to attend the training camp of the Anaheim Ducks on September 20, 2016. After his release from the Ducks pre-season roster, Booth later opted to return to the KHL, continuing with Avangard Omsk on November 17, 2016.

After two years in the KHL, Booth signed a PTO with the Detroit Red Wings on August 30, 2017, marking his third attempt to return to the NHL. On October 2, 2017, Booth made the team and signed a one-year, two way contract with the Red Wings. Booth played sparingly with the Red Wings, recording four goals and one assist while playing in just 28 games.

After his short tenure with the Red Wings, Booth indirectly announced his retirement from hockey, stating that he was "done with hockey" via his Twitter account.

As a free agent at the mid-point of the 2018–19 season, Booth returned to continue his professional career abroad, agreeing to a contract for the remainder of the year with Belarusian outfit, HC Dinamo Minsk of the KHL, on December 5, 2018.

=== Europe and Australia ===
From 2019 until 2025, Booth played irregularly for clubs in Norway, Germany and Hungary. His clubs included Manglerud Star, Vålerenga Ishockey, Storhamar Hockey, Eisbären Regensburg and Ferencvárosi TC.

On May 27, 2025, Booth joined Australian club Melbourne Ice. He made his AIHL debut three days later on May 30.

On November 19, 2025, Booth signed with the Fife Flyers of the EIHL.. During his stint with the team, Booth would suffer a season-ending lower-body injury during the team's Pride Night in early February 2026. It is believed that this injury is in part due to the fact that he didn't warm up in the pride jerseys due to his beliefs..

After recovering from his injury suffered in Scotland, he would re-sign with the Melbourne Ice on June 25, 2026..

== International play ==
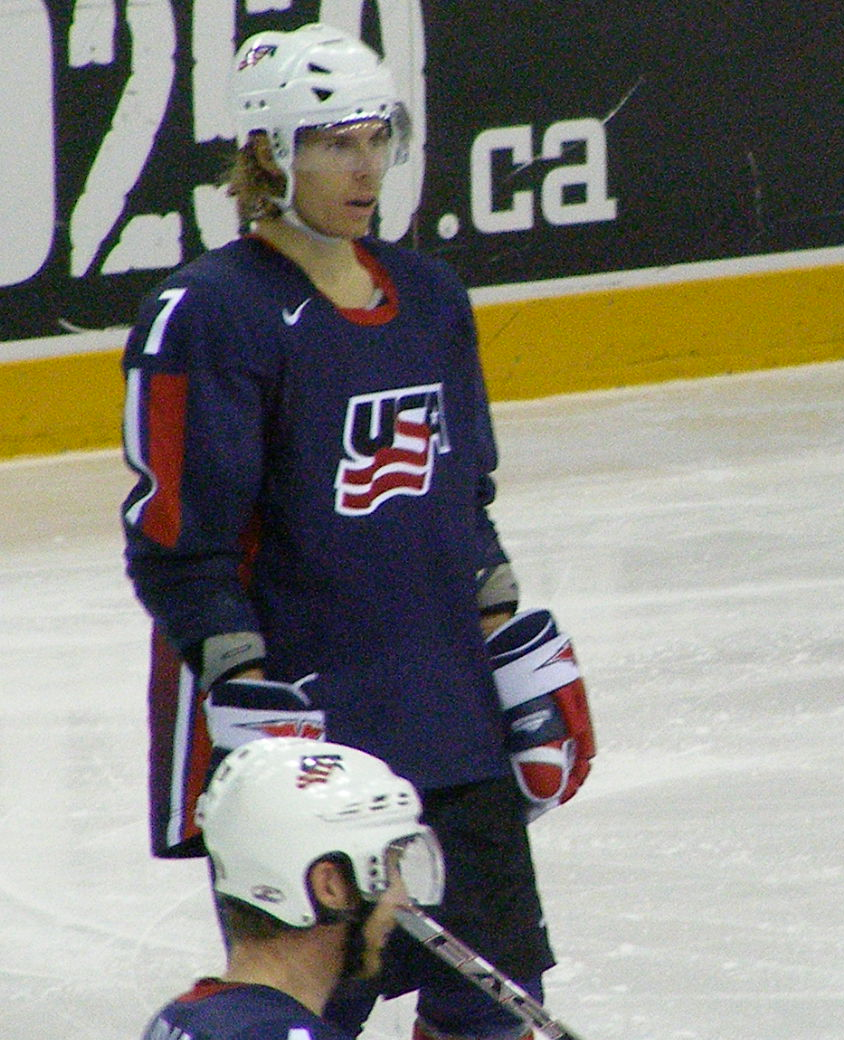
- Booth playing in the 2008 IIHF World Championship

Medal record

Representing United States

Ice hockey

World Junior Championships
Gold medal – first place	2004 Helsinki	

IIHF U18 Championships
Gold medal – first place	2002 Piešťany	

During his tenure with the United States National Team Development Program, Booth competed at the 2002 IIHF World U18 Championship, held in Trnava and Piešťany, Slovakia. Playing Russia in the last game of the final round, Booth scored the United States' first two goals of the game. A win against Russia placed the United States in a tie for the gold medal with four wins and one tie each. In order to beat Russia on the goal-differential tiebreaker, they needed to win the contest by two goals. Leading 2–1 with a minute remaining, the United States pulled their goalie and Zach Parise scored with 30 seconds left to capture the gold medal. Booth was named MVP of the gold medal game. Booth finished the tournament with two goals and two assists over eight games.

Two years later (now a member of the Michigan State Spartans), Booth moved on to the under-20 level, competing at the 2004 IIHF World Junior Championships, held in Helsinki and Hämeenlinna, Finland. He recorded his lone assist of the tournament on Dan Fritsche's game-winning goal in the semifinal against Finland. Booth and the United States went on to win the gold medal with a 4–3 win over Canada in the final. With a goal and an assist over six games, Booth tied for 12th in team point-scoring. In a 2011 interview for Canucks.com, Booth recalled his IIHF U18 and U20 gold medals as his first- and second-best hockey memories, respectively.

Following Booth's second season in the NHL with the Florida Panthers, he was named to his first United States men's team for the 2008 IIHF World Championships, held in Halifax and Quebec City, Canada. He scored his lone goal of the tournament (also his first international goal and point at the men's level) in a 5–1 preliminary round win against Slovakia. In the quarterfinals, the United States lost 3–2 to Finland and finished the tournament in sixth place.

The following year, he was invited to the national team's summer orientation camp in anticipation of the 2010 Winter Olympics. Booth later recalled that making the Olympic team was his goal at the start of the 2009–10 season. During the first month of NHL play, however, Booth suffered a concussion and was sidelined long-term. When the final Olympic roster was announced on January 1, 2010, Booth was still recovering from the injury and he was not selected.

== Playing style ==
At 6 feet (1.83 metres) and 212 pounds (96 kilograms), Booth's size enables him to play in the style of a power forward. Along with his physical stature, he is a fast skater, both of which allow him to retain the puck and contribute to his offensive skills.

== Personal life ==
Booth was born in Detroit, Michigan, and grew up in nearby Washington Township in Macomb County. His father's name is Mike. Booth has two brothers and one sister, Rachael. During Booth's career with the Panthers, he lived with his younger brother in Florida. Raised in a Christian household, Booth has publicly professed his faith during his professional career. Growing up, he was a fan of the Detroit Red Wings and attended home games as his family owned season tickets. He has listed favorite players as a child as Red Wings forwards Steve Yzerman and Brendan Shanahan, as well as Keith Tkachuk, who played for the Winnipeg Jets/Phoenix Coyotes franchise, St. Louis Blues and Atlanta Thrashers.

During Booth's minor hockey career, he was linemates with fellow Michigan native Ryan Kesler for two years, beginning at age 12. They played together in the 1998 Quebec International Pee-Wee Hockey Tournament with the Detroit Honeybaked minor ice hockey team. The two went on to become teammates with the US National Team Development Program from 2001 to 2002, the U.S. national junior team in 2004 and the Vancouver Canucks in the NHL from 2011 to 2014, respectively. In addition to hockey, he also played baseball and golf growing up.

Booth earned his secondary education at Lutheran High School North in Macomb and Huron High School in Ann Arbor, Michigan. He moved to and graduated from the latter to facilitate his participation with the US National Team Development Program, which was based out of Ann Arbor. During his tenure with the Development Program, he made the choice to play NCAA hockey, opting against the major junior Ontario Hockey League (OHL) in order to attend college. The decision was encouraged by his father, who valued Booth's education. Enrolled at Michigan State University while playing for the school's hockey team, he studied dentistry before switching to general management.

Booth married model and former beauty queen from Tennessee, Ashley Durham, in June 2014. Their relationship was featured on the second season of the Canadian reality series Hockey Wives.

=== Controversy ===
An avid hunter, Booth posted a YouTube video in May 2012 of him baiting and killing an American black bear. Though the practice is legal in Alberta, it is banned in 18 American states, as well as British Columbia, the Vancouver Canucks' province. Booth's actions were widely criticized by the public, causing him to remove the video within days.

On January 31, 2026, Booth's team, the Fife Flyers, made changes to their Pride Night jersey plans, explaining that they were "respecting the diversity of backgrounds and personal beliefs within our playing group." As such, Pride jerseys were worn only during warm ups, with Booth the only player who did not participate during the warm ups, leading to speculation that his refusal led to the jersey change. In the first five minutes, Booth had a non-contact injury and needed help to leave the ice. The coach later indicated that the injury could be long-term. The changes made to the presentation of pride have widely criticized as they were made mere hours before face-off. The club had until this point a long history of wearing their pride jerseys for game night.

== Career statistics ==
=== Regular season and playoffs ===
			Regular season					Playoffs
Season	Team	League	GP	G	A	Pts	PIM	GP	G	A	Pts	PIM
2000–01	Detroit Compuware	NAHL	42	17	13	30	44	2	1	0	1	2
2001–02	U.S. NTDP Juniors	USHL	12	4	3	7	6	—	—	—	—	—
2001–02	U.S. NTDP U18	NAHL	6	1	3	4	18	—	—	—	—	—
2001–02	U.S. NTDP U18	USDP	40	12	6	18	17	—	—	—	—	—
2002–03	Michigan State University	CCHA	39	17	19	36	53	—	—	—	—	—
2003–04	Michigan State University	CCHA	30	8	10	18	30	—	—	—	—	—
2004–05	Michigan State University	CCHA	29	7	9	16	30	—	—	—	—	—
2005–06	Michigan State University	CCHA	36	13	22	35	50	—	—	—	—	—
2006–07	Rochester Americans	AHL	25	7	7	14	26	6	0	2	2	4
2006–07	Florida Panthers	NHL	48	3	7	10	12	—	—	—	—	—
2007–08	Florida Panthers	NHL	73	22	18	40	26	—	—	—	—	—
2008–09	Florida Panthers	NHL	72	31	29	60	38	—	—	—	—	—
2009–10	Florida Panthers	NHL	28	8	8	16	23	—	—	—	—	—
2010–11	Florida Panthers	NHL	82	23	17	40	26	—	—	—	—	—
2011–12	Florida Panthers	NHL	6	0	1	1	2	—	—	—	—	—
2011–12	Vancouver Canucks	NHL	56	16	13	29	32	5	0	1	1	0
2012–13	Vancouver Canucks	NHL	12	1	2	3	4	—	—	—	—	—
2013–14	Vancouver Canucks	NHL	66	9	10	19	18	—	—	—	—	—
2013–14	Utica Comets	AHL	3	0	1	1	0	—	—	—	—	—
2014–15	Toronto Marlies	AHL	2	1	0	1	2	—	—	—	—	—
2014–15	Toronto Maple Leafs	NHL	59	7	6	13	25	—	—	—	—	—
2015–16	Admiral Vladivostok	KHL	23	6	10	16	30	5	0	0	0	12
2016–17	Avangard Omsk	KHL	19	4	5	9	16	12	2	0	2	10
2017–18	Detroit Red Wings	NHL	28	4	1	5	10	—	—	—	—	—
2018–19	Dinamo Minsk	KHL	18	2	1	3	20	—	—	—	—	—
2019–20	Manglerud Star	NOR	22	20	6	26	51	—	—	—	—	—
2021–22	Vålerenga	NOR	15	15	14	29	2	5	4	4	8	2
2022–23	Jackson Hole Moose	BDHL	1	1	4	5	0	—	—	—	—	—
2022–23	Storhamar	NOR	16	11	12	23	8	17	8	10	18	12
2023–24	Eisbären Regensburg	DEL2	16	9	5	14	10	15	11	4	15	11
2024–25	Ferencvárosi	Erste	8	10	7	17	10	1	0	0	0	0
2025–26	Melbourne Ice	AIHL	14	34	30	64	12	2	2	3	5	0
NHL totals			530	124	112	236	216	5	0	1	1	0

=== International ===
Year	Team	Event	Result	GP	G	A	Pts	PIM
2002	United States	WJC18	1st place, gold medalist(s)	8	2	2	4	10
2004	United States	WJC	1st place, gold medalist(s)	6	0	1	1	2
2008	United States	WC	6th	7	1	0	1	2
Junior totals				14	2	3	5	12
Senior totals				7	1	0	1	2

== Awards and honors ==
Award	Year
NAHL
All-Rookie Team	2000–01
Rookie of the Year	2000–01
CCHA
Michigan State Spartans Rookie of the Year	2002–03
All-CCHA Rookie Team	2002–03
Mason Cup (playoff championship; Michigan State Spartans)	2006
Florida Panthers
Most valuable player	2008–09
IIHF
World U18 gold medal	2002
World U20 gold medal	2004
Vancouver Canucks
Most exciting player	2011–12
