= Miss USA 2000 =

49th Miss USA pageant

- Date: February 4, 2000
- Presenters: Carson Daly; Ali Landry; Julie Moran
- Entertainment: Christina Aguilera; Lou Bega; Brian McKnight; Mark Wills
- Venue: Grand Palace, Branson, Missouri
- Broadcaster: CBS, KOLR
- Winner: Lynnette Cole; Tennessee
- Congeniality: Michelle Kaplan; Hawaii
- Photogenic: Paige Swenson; Minnesota

Miss USA 2000 was the 49th Miss USA pageant, held at The Grand Palace, in Branson, Missouri on February 4, 2000. At the conclusion of the final competition,

At the end of the event, Kimberly Pressler of New York crowned Lynnette Cole of Tennessee as Miss USA 2000. It is the first victory of Tennessee in the pageant's history. Cole later competed at Miss Universe and was one of the five finalists.

Contestants from 51 states and cities competed in this year's pageant. Carson Daly hosted the event for the only time, and color commentary was added for the third time by Miss USA 1996 Ali Landry and Julie Moran. Entertainment was provided by Christina Aguilera, Lou Bega, Brian McKnight and Mark Wills.

== Results ==
=== Placements ===
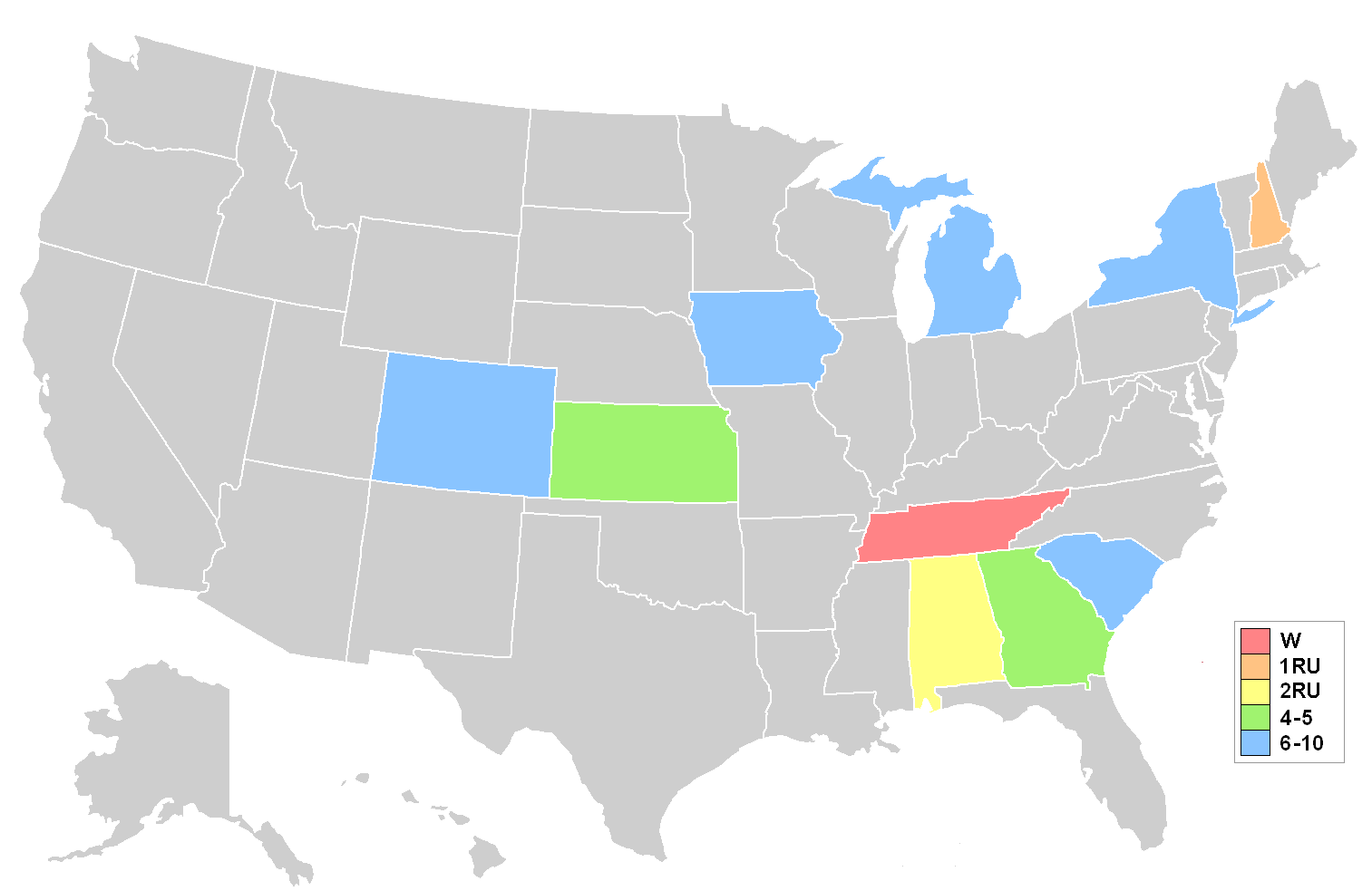
Map showing placements by state

Placement	Contestant
Miss USA 2000	Tennessee – Lynnette Cole
1st runner-up	New Hampshire – Bridget Jane Vezina
2nd runner-up	Alabama – Jina Mitchell
Top 5	Georgia – Patti Dunn; Kansas – Tiffany Meyer
Top 10	Colorado – Tiani Jones; Iowa – Jensie Grigsby; Michigan – Jill Dobson; New York – Carrie Tucker; South Carolina – Lisa Rabon

=== Special awards ===
Award	Contestant
Miss Congeniality	Hawaii – Michelle Kaplan
Miss Photogenic	Minnesota – Paige Swenson
Style Award	Florida – Kristen Ludecke
Best in Swimsuit	Tennessee – Lynnette Cole

=== Final competition scores ===
State	Interview	Swimsuit	Evening Gown	Average	Finalists
Tennessee	9.81 (1)	9.64 (1)	9.78 (2)	9.74 (1)	9.66 (1)
New Hampshire	9.58 (2)	9.32 (6)	9.27 (6)	9.39 (5)	9.40 (3)
Alabama	9.54 (3)	9.51 (4)	9.93 (1)	9.66 (2)	9.45 (2)
Kansas	9.36 (6)	9.53 (2)	9.63 (3)	9.51 (3)	9.36 (4)
Georgia	9.29 (7)	9.52 (3)	9.41 (4)	9.40 (4)	9.14 (5)
Colorado	9.21 (8)	9.26 (7)	9.33 (5)	9.27 (6)	
Michigan	9.44 (5)	9.07 (8)	9.24 (8)	9.25 (7)	
New York	9.47 (4)	9.06 (9)	8.93 (10)	9.16(8)	
South Carolina	8.74 (10)	9.39 (5)	9.24 (7)	9.12 (9)	
Iowa	9.10 (9)	8.95 (10)	9.02 (9)	9.02 (10)	

Winner
First Runner-Up
Second Runner-Up
Top 5 Finalist
(#) Ranking in the competition

== Contestants ==
51 contestants competed for the title.

State/City	Contestant	Age (Note: Ages at the time of the pageant)	Hometown	Notes
Alabama	Jina Mitchell	22	Trussville	
Alaska	Laurie Ann Miller	21	Palmer	Previously Miss Alaska Teen USA 1997
Arizona	Heather Keckler	26	Scottsdale	Previously Miss Arizona Teen USA 1992
Arkansas	Whitney Lea Moore	22	Cabot	
California	Rebekah Ann Keller	25	Lakewood	Former Miss California 1997; Fourth runner-up at Miss America 1997
Colorado	Tiani Jones	23	Aurora	
Connecticut	Sallie Toussaint	25	Hartford	US representative to Miss World in 1997; Top 10 semi-finalist at Miss World 1997
Delaware	Jennifer Behm	23	Wilmington	
District of Columbia	Juel April Casamayor	26	Washington, D.C.	
Florida	Kristin Ludecke	23	Eustis	Previously Miss Florida 1995
Georgia	Patti Dunn	24	Duluth	
Hawaii	Michelle Kaplan	23	Kona	
Idaho	Brooke Jennifer Gambrell	26	Boise	Previously Miss Idaho 1995
Illinois	Constance Renee Stoetzer	26	Abingdon	
Indiana	Kristal Michelle Wile	23	Anderson	
Iowa	Jensie Grigsby	26	West Des Moines	
Kansas	Tiffany Meyer	23		Previously Miss Missouri Teen USA 1994
Kentucky	Jolene Youngster	18	Glasgow	
Louisiana	Jennifer Dupont	18	Plaquemine	Previously Miss Louisiana Teen USA 1998; Later became Miss Louisiana 2004
Maine	Jennifer Lyn Hunt	21	Rumford	Previously Miss Maine Teen USA 1994
Maryland	Christie S. Davis	21	Silver Spring	
Massachusetts	Rosalie M. Allain	25	Leominster	
Michigan	Jillian Susan Dobson	22	Quincy	
Minnesota	Paige Swenson	24	Fridley	Previously Miss Minnesota Teen USA 1994
Mississippi	Angie Michelle Carpenter	22	Greenwood	Previously Miss Mississippi Teen USA 1994
Missouri	Denette Roderick	24		
Montana	Brandi Bjorklund	20	Bonner	
Nebraska	Valarie Cook	22	Omaha	
Nevada	Alicia Denyse Carnes	22	Las Vegas	Previously Miss Nevada Teen USA 1995
New Hampshire	Bridget Jane Vezina	19	Manchester	
New Jersey	Michelle Graci	21	Jamesburg	
New Mexico	Christina I. Ortega	23	Las Cruces	
New York	Carrie Tucker	25	Nesconset	
North Carolina	Portia Lyndell Johnson	20	Greensboro	
North Dakota	Amie Hoffner	18	Minot	
Ohio	Cheya R. Watkins	22	Cincinnati	Previously Miss Ohio 1998
Oklahoma	Amanda Rochelle Penix	21	Shawnee	Previously Miss Oklahoma Teen USA 1997
Oregon	Elizabeth Heitmanek	19	Medford	
Pennsylvania	Angela Patla	26	Sweet Valley	
Rhode Island	Heidi St. Pierre	23	Harrisville	
South Carolina	Lisa Rabon	24	Myrtle Beach	
South Dakota	Vanessa Short Bull	21	Rapid City	Later Miss South Dakota 2002
Tennessee	Lynnette Marie Cole	21	Columbia	Previously Miss Tennessee Teen USA 1995
Texas	Heather Ogilvie	22	Houston	
Utah	Keri Hatfield	22	Bountiful	
Vermont	Katie Bolton	22	Colchester	
Virginia	Crystal Marie Jones	26	Virginia Beach	
Washington	Jamie Marie Kern	22	Des Moines	Contestant on season 1 of Big Brother, finished in fourth place. Co-founder and CEO of It Cosmetics.
West Virginia	Tara Shae Wilson	22	Sistersville	
Wisconsin	Samantha Jo Picha	20	Verona	
Wyoming	Rebecca Smith	20	Jackson Hole	
