= Miss Tennessee USA =

Beauty contest

- Formation: 1952
- Type: Beauty pageant
- Headquarters: Collierville
- Location: Tennessee
- Members: Miss USA
- Official language: English
- Key people: Kimberly Payne Greenwood, State Pageant Director
- Website: Official website

The Miss Tennessee USA competition is the pageant that selects the representative for the state of Tennessee in the Miss USA pageant. The pageant is directed by Greenwood Productions under the ownership of Miss Tennessee USA 1989, Kimberly Payne Greenwood, since 1992. Since 1999, the pageant has been held at Austin Peay State University in Clarksville, Tennessee. (Note: Except 2021, where it was held alternatively in Tunica, Mississippi due to off-campus event restrictions related to the COVID-19 pandemic in Tennessee.)

Lynnette "Lynn" Cole, Miss Tennessee USA 2000, and Rachel Smith, Miss Tennessee USA 2007, are the only titleholders to win the Miss USA title and both previously won the Miss Tennessee Teen USA title. Six Miss Tennessee USA titleholders have formerly competed at Miss Tennessee Teen USA, and six have competed at Miss America. One of these is Allison Alderson, a "triple crown" winner who has held the Miss Tennessee Teen USA, Miss Tennessee, and Miss Tennessee USA titles, competing at all three major pageants.

Sydney Grace Young of Clarksville was appointed Miss Tennessee USA 2026 on June 30th, 2026 after the open casting call from Thomas Brodeur, the new owner of the national pageant. She will represent Tennessee for the title of Miss USA 2026.

== Gallery of titleholders ==
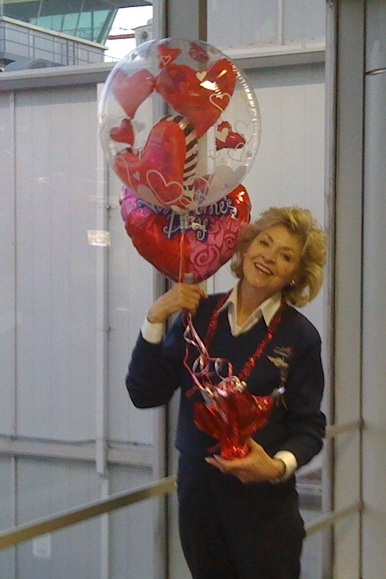
Sandra Force, Miss Tennessee USA 1968

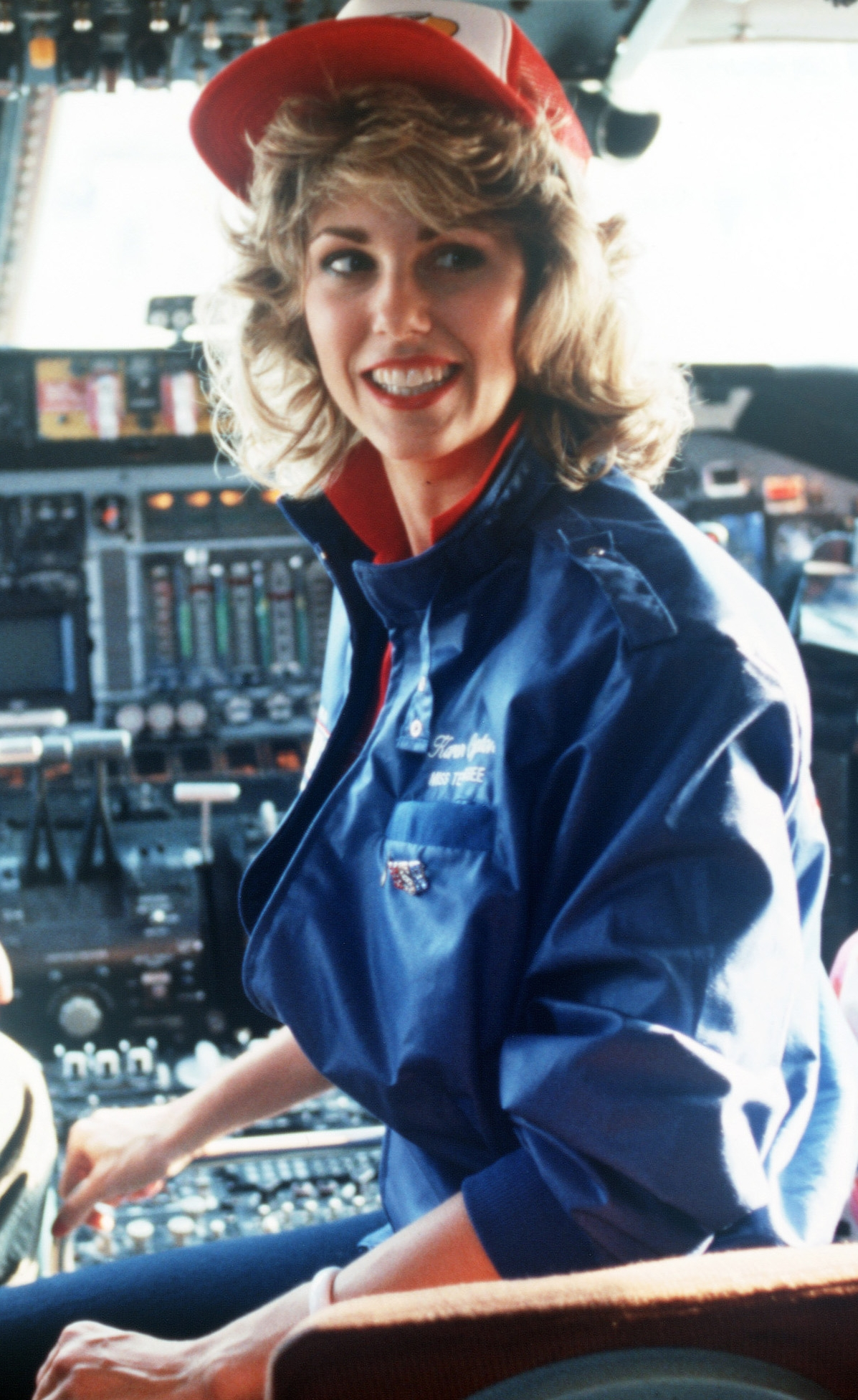
Karen Compton, Miss Tennessee USA 1986

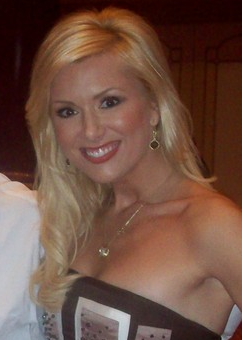
Allison Alderson, Miss Tennessee USA 2002 (pictured in 2008)

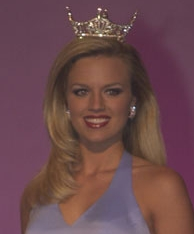
Stephanie Culberson, Miss Tennessee USA 2004

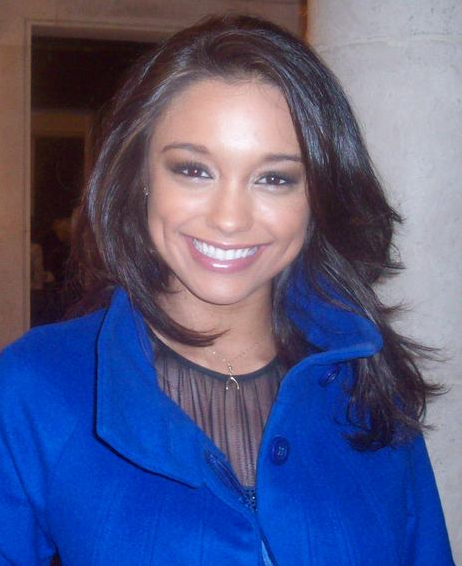
Rachel Smith, Miss Tennessee USA 2007 and Miss USA 2007

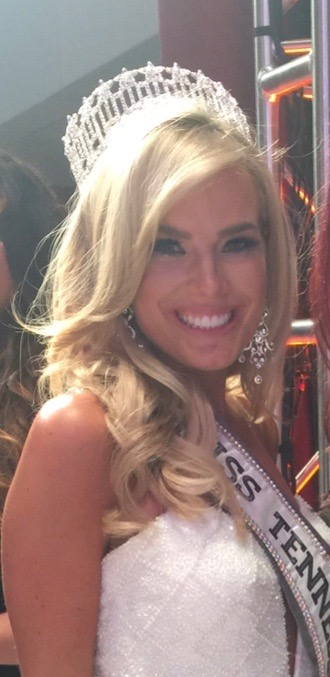
Allee-Sutton Hethcoat, Miss Tennessee USA 2017

== Results summary ==
- Miss USAs: Lynnette "Lynn" Cole (2000), Rachel Smith (2007)
- 1st runners-up: Morgan Tandy High (1999), Ashley Durham (2011)
- 2nd runners-up: Gail White (1962), Desiree Daniels (1984), Becca Lee (1996), Towanna Stone (1997)
- 3rd runners-up: Jean Harper (1952), Donna Marie Ford (1970), Christell Foote (2024)
- 4th runners-up: Beth Hood (2003), Stephanie Culberson (2004)
- Top 10/12: Sharon Kay Steakley (1981), Sherly Deanice "Nise" Levy (1982), Stephanie Jane Potts (1988), Charita Moses (1990), Camila "Cammy" Gregory (1993), Leah Hulan (1994), Lisa Tollett (2001), Hailey Laine Brown (2008), Kristen Motil (2009), Tucker Perry (2010), Allee-Sutton Hethcoat (2017), Alexandra Harper (2018), Emily Suttle (2022)
- Top 15/16/20: Stella Wilson (1956), Martha Boales (1958), Bobbie Lynn Morrow (1963), Mary Margaret Smith (1966), Nancy Brackhahn (1967), Sandra Force (1968), Lauren Grissom (2006), Jessica Hibler (2012), Kristy Landers Niedenfuer (2014), Elizabeth Pistole (2021), Madison Kunst (2025)

Tennessee holds a record of 37 placements at Miss USA, fourth overall behind Texas, California, and South Carolina.

=== Awards ===
- Miss Photogenic: Suzanna Timberlake (1978)
- Best State Costume: Pat Kerr (1964), Elizabeth Pistole (2021)
- Miss Congeniality: Bonnie Perkins (1965), Martha Browning (1985)
- Style Award: Becca Lee (1996)
- Best in Swimsuit: Lynnette "Lynn" Cole (2000)
- Best in Evening Gown: Christell Foote (2024)

== Winners ==
Color key

- Declared as Winner
- Ended as runner-up
- Ended as one of the finalists or semifinalists

Year	Name	Hometown	Age (Note: Age at the time of crowning)	Local title	Placement at Miss USA	Special awards at Miss USA	Notes
2026	Sydney Grace Young	Clarksville	26	Miss Clarksville			
2025	Madison Kunst	Nashville	27	Miss Madison County	Top 20		
2024	Christell Foote	Rocky Top	23	Miss Rocky Top	3rd runner-up	Best in Evening Gown	
2023	Regan Ringler	Nashville	25	Miss Downtown Nashville			
2022	Emily Suttle	Franklin	25	Miss Franklin	Top 12		Previously Miss Tennessee Teen USA 2013; Top 16 semifinalist at Miss Teen USA 2013
2021	Elizabeth Graham Pistole	Franklin	20	Miss Historic Franklin	Top 16	Best State Costume	Previously both 1st runner-up at Miss Tennessee Teen USA 2017 and Miss Tennessee Teen USA 2019
2020	Justice Enlow	Nashville	26	Miss Belle Meade			Longest reigning Miss Tennessee USA at 1 year, 5 months and 1 day
2019	Savana Hodge	Nashville	25	Miss Davidson County			
2018	Alexandra Harper	Brentwood	25	Miss Williamson County	Top 10		Daughter of Sharon Kay Steakley, Miss Tennessee USA 1981
2017	Allee-Sutton Hethcoat	Franklin	25	Miss Williamson County	Top 10		
2016	Hope Stephens	Livingston	20	Miss Upper Cumberland			Previously 1st runner-up at Miss Tennessee Teen USA 2014
2015	Kiara Young	Nashville	23	Miss Greater Nashville			
2014	Kristy Landers Niedenfuer	Nashville	22	Miss Nashville	Top 20		Daughter of Major League Baseball pitcher Tom Niedenfuer and actress Judy Landers; Later Miss Louisiana World 2015; 3rd runner-up at Miss World America 2015
2013	Brenna Mader	Nashville	25	Miss Davidson County			Previously Miss Wyoming Teen USA 2005; Sister of Jamie Mader, Miss Wyoming Teen USA 2002
2012	Jessica Hibler	Brentwood	22	Miss Middle Tennessee State University	Top 16		
2011	Ashley Durham	Adamsville	20	Miss East Memphis	1st runner-up		Previously Miss Tennessee Teen USA 2006
2010	Tucker Perry	Franklin	20	Miss Tennessee Valley	Top 10		Daughter of Kathi Tucker, Miss Washington USA 1983
2009	Kristen Motil	Franklin	24	Miss Williamson County	Top 10		
2008	Hailey Laine Brown	Franklin	25	Miss South Fulton	Top 10		Previously 4th runner-up at Miss Tennessee 2003
2007	Rachel Smith	Clarksville	21	Miss Clarksville	Miss USA 2007		Born in Panama; Previously Miss Tennessee Teen USA 2002; Top 10 Semi-Finalist & Miss Photogenic at Miss Teen USA 2002; 4th runner-up at Miss Universe 2007; Host ABC's On the Red Carpet
2006	Lauren Grissom	Shelbyville	21	Miss Shelbyville	Top 15		Previously dating country singer Jake Owen; Participant on VH1's You're Cut Off!
2005	Amy Colley	Jonesborough	21				Later 2nd runner-up at Miss Tennessee 2008
2004	Stephanie Culberson	Knoxville	24		4th runner-up		Previously Miss Tennessee 2001; 2nd runner-up at Miss America 2002
2003	Beth Hood	Cleveland	24		4th runner-up		Previously Miss Tennessee 2000
2002	Allison Alderson	Nashville	25				Triple crown winner: Previously Miss Tennessee Teen USA 1994; Top 6 at Miss Teen USA 1994; Previously Miss Tennessee 1999; Sister of Miss District of Columbia USA 1999, Amy Alderson
2001	Lisa Tollett	Crossville	24		Top 10		Previously engaged with NASCAR Sprint Cup Series driver Elliott Sadler
2000	Lynnette Marie "Lynn" Cole	Columbia	21		Miss USA 2000	Best in Swimsuit	Previously Miss Tennessee Teen USA 1995; 3rd runner-up & Miss Photogenic at Miss Teen USA 1995; 3rd runner up at Miss Oktoberfest 1998; Miss Teen All American 1997; Top 5 finalist at Miss Universe 2000
1999	Morgan Tandy High	Nashville	25		1st runner-up		
1998	Amy Neely	Lafayette				Honorable Mention	
1997	Towanna Stone	Morristown	24		2nd runner-up		First Black woman to win Miss Tennessee USA
1996	Becca Lee	Memphis	24		2nd runner-up	Finesse Style Award	
1995	Lee Ann Huey	Obion					
1994	Leah Hulan	Murfreesboro	25		Top 12		Previously Miss Tennessee 1992
1993	Camila "Cammy" Gregory	Paris	25		Top 12		The Kentucky native died on January 3, 2003, of a sudden brain aneurysm in Jackson, Tennessee
1992	Natalie Bray						
1991	Angela Johnson						
1990	Charita Moses	Memphis	23		Top 12		
1989	Kimberly Payne	Nashville	21				Previously Tennessee's Junior Miss 1985; Current director of Georgia, Mississippi and Tennessee (both Miss & Teen) pageants under her married name, Kimberly Greenwood
1988	Stephanie Jane Potts	Memphis	23		Semi-finalist		
1987	Molly Brown	Loretto					Previously Miss Tennessee Teen USA 1984; 2nd runner-up at Miss Teen USA 1984
1986	Karen Compton	Lawrenceburg					
1985	Martha Browning	Chattanooga	24			Miss Congeniality	First deaf Miss USA contestant.
1984	Desiree Daniels	Chattanooga	24		2nd runner-up		Previously Miss Tennessee 1982; Finished 1st runner up to Miss America 1983
1983	Ladonna Friday	Jonesborough					
1982	Sherly Deanice "Nise" Levy	Nashville	21		Semi-finalist		Producer of I'm Not Ashamed; Appeared on Australian series of The World's Strictest Parents
1981	Sharon Kay Steakley	Nashville	24		Semi-finalist		Mother of Alexandra Harper, Miss Tennessee USA 2018
1980	Diane Hunt	Etowah					
1979	Sandy Nuismer	Nashville					
1978	Suzanna Timberlake	Chattanooga				Miss Photogenic	Semifinalist in Miss World USA 1980
1977	Rene Smith	Cookeville					
1976	Jana Kerr	Savannah					
1975	Shelly Smith	Memphis					Previously Miss Memphis State 1975
1974	Brin Hendrix	Counce					
1973	Tommye Hooker	Memphis					
1972	Linda Thompson	Memphis	21				Placed 3rd runner-up at Miss Tennessee 1970; Actress and songwriter; Married (and then divorced) to Bruce Jenner and David Foster; Mother of Brandon and Brody Jenner
1971	Sue Collins	Strawberry Plains					
1970	Donna Marie Ford	Trenton	23		3rd runner-up		
1969	Suzie Richardson	Jackson					
1968	Sandra Force	Memphis	23		Semi-finalist	Top 15 Best in Swimsuit	
1967	Nancy Brackhahn	Nashville	21		Semi-finalist		
1966	Mary Margaret Smith	Nashville	20		Semi-finalist		
1965	Bonnie Perkins	Nashville	23			Miss Congeniality	
1964	Pat Kerr	Nashville	19			Best State Costume	
1963	Bobbie Lynn Morrow	Camden	26		Top 15		
1962	Gail White	Chattanooga	21		2nd runner-up		
1961	Anita Atkins	Nashville	25				
1960	Christine McSwain	Memphis	21				
1959	Marcia Daniels	Memphis	20				
1958	Martha Boales	Memphis	23	Miss Memphis	Semi-finalist		1st runner-up in the 1959 Miss Dixie Pageant
1957	Patricia Prather	Memphis	18				
1956	Stella Wilson	Memphis	22		Semi-finalist		
1955	Barbara Gurley	Memphis	24				
1954	Barbara Holly	Nashville	21				
1953	No representative						
1952	Jean Harper	Memphis	18		3rd runner-up		Previously Miss Tennessee 1951
