= Allison Alderson =

American actress (born 1977)

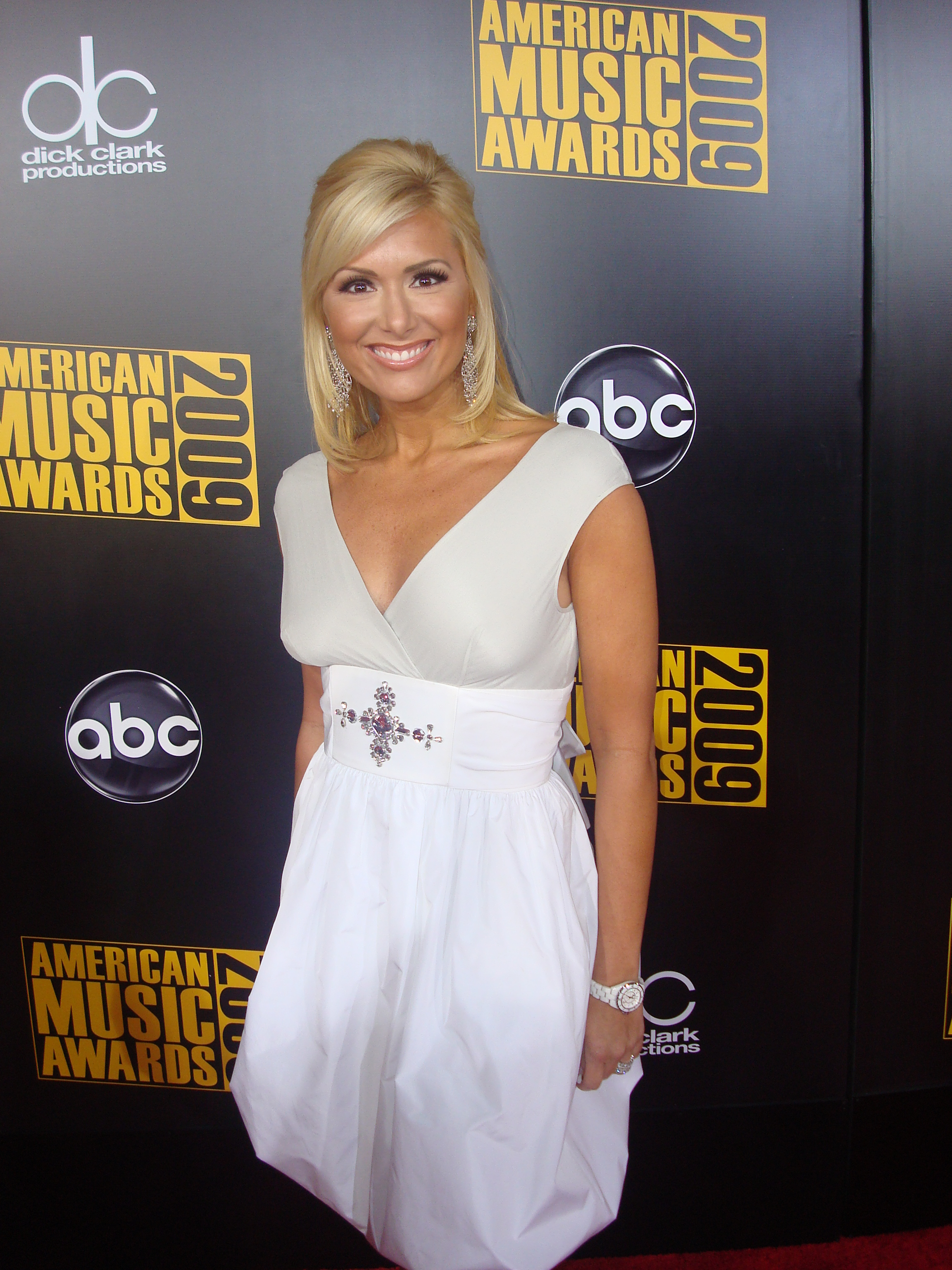
- Alderson in 2009
- Born: Allison Leigh Alderson; January 18, 1977 (age 49); Jackson, Tennessee, U.S.
- Other name: Allison DeMarcus
- Spouse: Jay DeMarcus (m. 2004)
- Children: 2
- Relatives: James Otto (brother-in-law)
- Beauty pageant titleholder
- Title: Miss Tennessee Teen USA 1994; Miss Tennessee 1999; Miss Tennessee USA 2002
- Hair color: Blonde
- Eye color: Brown
- Major competitions: Miss Teen USA 1994 (Top 6); Miss America 2000; Miss USA 2002

Allison Leigh Alderson DeMarcus (born January 18, 1977) is an American actress, television host, and beauty pageant titleholder who has competed in the Miss Teen USA, Miss USA and Miss America pageants. Alderson is married to Jay DeMarcus, the bassist of country music band Rascal Flatts.

== Biography ==
Alderson grew up in Jackson, Tennessee, and is a graduate of the University School of Jackson. She graduated cum laude with a degree in business administration from Rhodes College in 1999, where she served as president of the Chi Omega sorority. She won the Wall Street Journal Award for Excellence in Finance because she was the top finance student in her graduating class. As part of the Bryce Harlow Institute of Business and Government Affairs, she also studied at Georgetown University in Washington, DC. Alderson's sister Amy held the Miss District of Columbia USA 1999 title, at the same time that Alderson was Miss Tennessee. Alderson's sister is married to country artist James Otto. Alderson was Miss Tennessee Teen USA 1994, Miss Tennessee 1999 and Miss Tennessee USA 2002.

Alderson currently works on the CMT show Hot 20 Countdown and is the regular host of the Miss Tennessee pageant, which is held in her hometown, Jackson. She has been a red-carpet-show host for the CMT Music Awards, a roving reporter and correspondent for the Miss America pageant, and a correspondent for CMT Insider. She served as "style judge" for CMT's Karaoke Dokey and hosted Extreme Makeover: Quickbooks Edition.

Off camera, Alderson is on the boards of directors of Vanderbilt Children's Hospital, the Women's Fund of the Community Foundation of Middle Tennessee, the Make-A-Wish Foundation of Middle Tennessee, and the Miss Tennessee Scholarship Pageant. She also volunteers for Chi Omega, the Nashville Symphony League, the Nashville Humane Association, the Nashville Ballet, Second Harvest Food Bank, the Nashville Alliance and the Oasis Center.

Alderson is currently the founder and CEO of the Miss Volunteer America pageant.

== Personal life ==
On May 15, 2004, Alderson married Jay DeMarcus, bassist and pianist in the band Rascal Flatts. Alderson met DeMarcus when she acted in the music video for the band's song "These Days". The couple has two children.

Additionally, country music singer-songwriter James Otto is Alderson's brother-in-law through his marriage to her sister Amy.

Awards and achievements
Preceded by Jaime Dudney	Miss Tennessee Teen USA; 1994	Succeeded by Lynnette Cole
Preceded by Heather Heath	Miss Tennessee; 1999	Succeeded by Beth Hood
Preceded by Lisa Tollett	Miss Tennessee USA; 2002	Succeeded by Beth Hood
