= Kimberly Payne Greenwood =

American beauty pageant titleholder

United States Ambassador to Barbados and the Eastern Caribbean
- Nominee
- Assumed office TBD
- President: Donald Trump
- Preceded by: Roger F. Nyhus

Personal details
- Born: 1967 (age 58–59)
- Spouse: Lee Greenwood (m. 1992)
- Children: 2
- Education: University of Tennessee at Chattanooga (BA)
- Occupation: Entrepreneur; pageant director
- Beauty pageant titleholder
- Title: Miss Tennessee USA 1989

Kimberly Payne Greenwood (born 1967) is an American entrepreneur and former beauty pageant titleholder. She is the president of Greenwood Productions, which operates state-level competitions associated with Miss USA and Miss Teen USA. In 1989, Greenwood was crowned Miss Tennessee USA and has been involved in pageant management for several decades.

In September 2026, she was nominated by Donald Trump to serve as United States Ambassador to Barbados and the Eastern Caribbean.

== Education ==
Greenwood attended the University of Tennessee at Chattanooga, where she received a BA in English and communication.

== Pageantry ==
In 1985, Greenwood won Tennessee's Junior Miss pageant. Four years later in 1989, she was crowned Miss Tennessee USA. Following her crowning, she toured with the United Service Organizations for four years, performing for members of the United States Armed Forces.

== Career ==
In 1993, Greenwood began working as an executive director for the Miss USA Organization. Through Greenwood Productions, she has overseen state-level Miss USA and Miss Teen USA competitions in Tennessee, Mississippi, and Georgia.

In 2025, Bella Bautista, who was set to become the first transgender contestant in Miss Georgia USA, withdrew from the competition, citing differences in values with the organization and concerns about Greenwood's relationship with Donald Trump.

In 2026, Greenwood was nominated by Donald Trump to serve as Ambassador to Barbados and the Eastern Caribbean. On November 18, the Senate Committee on Foreign Relations voted 13–8 to report her nomination favorably to the full Senate.

== Personal life ==
In 1992, Greenwood married country musician Lee Greenwood, whom she met on a USO tour. They have two sons and live in Franklin, Tennessee. They attend Brentwood Baptist Church in Brentwood.
