= Miss Tennessee Teen USA =

Beauty pageant competition

- Formation: 1983
- Type: Beauty pageant
- Headquarters: Nashville
- Location: Tennessee
- Members: Miss Teen USA
- Official language: English
- Website: Official website

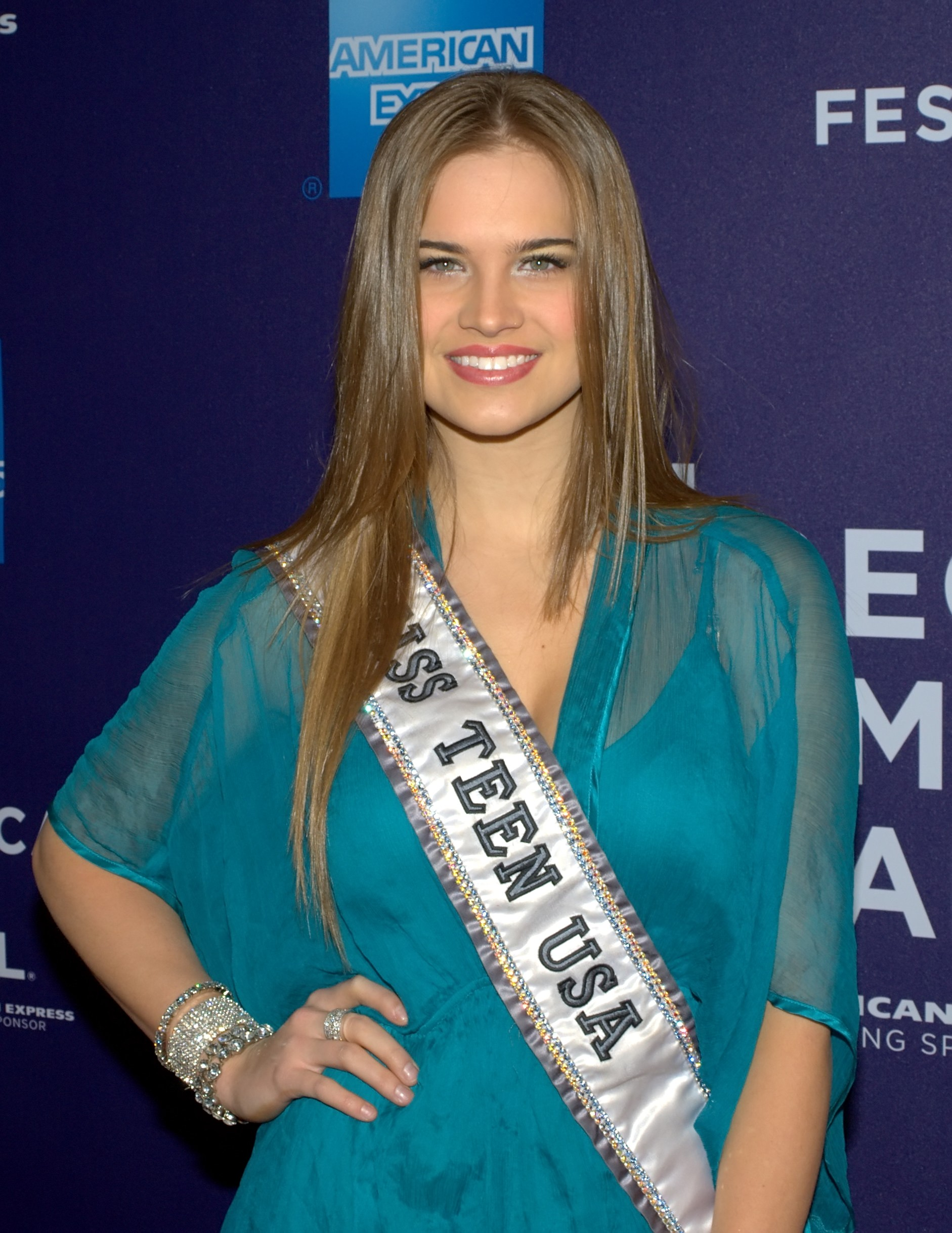
Stormi Henley, Miss Tennessee Teen USA and Miss Teen USA 2009

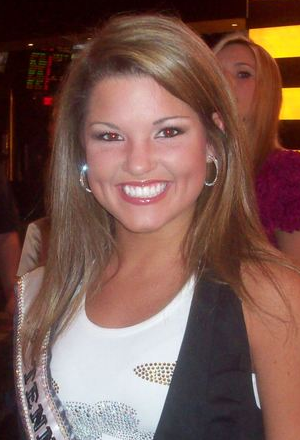
Natalie Phillips, Miss Tennessee Teen USA 2008

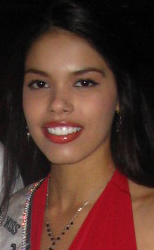
Macy Erwin, Miss Tennessee Teen USA 2007

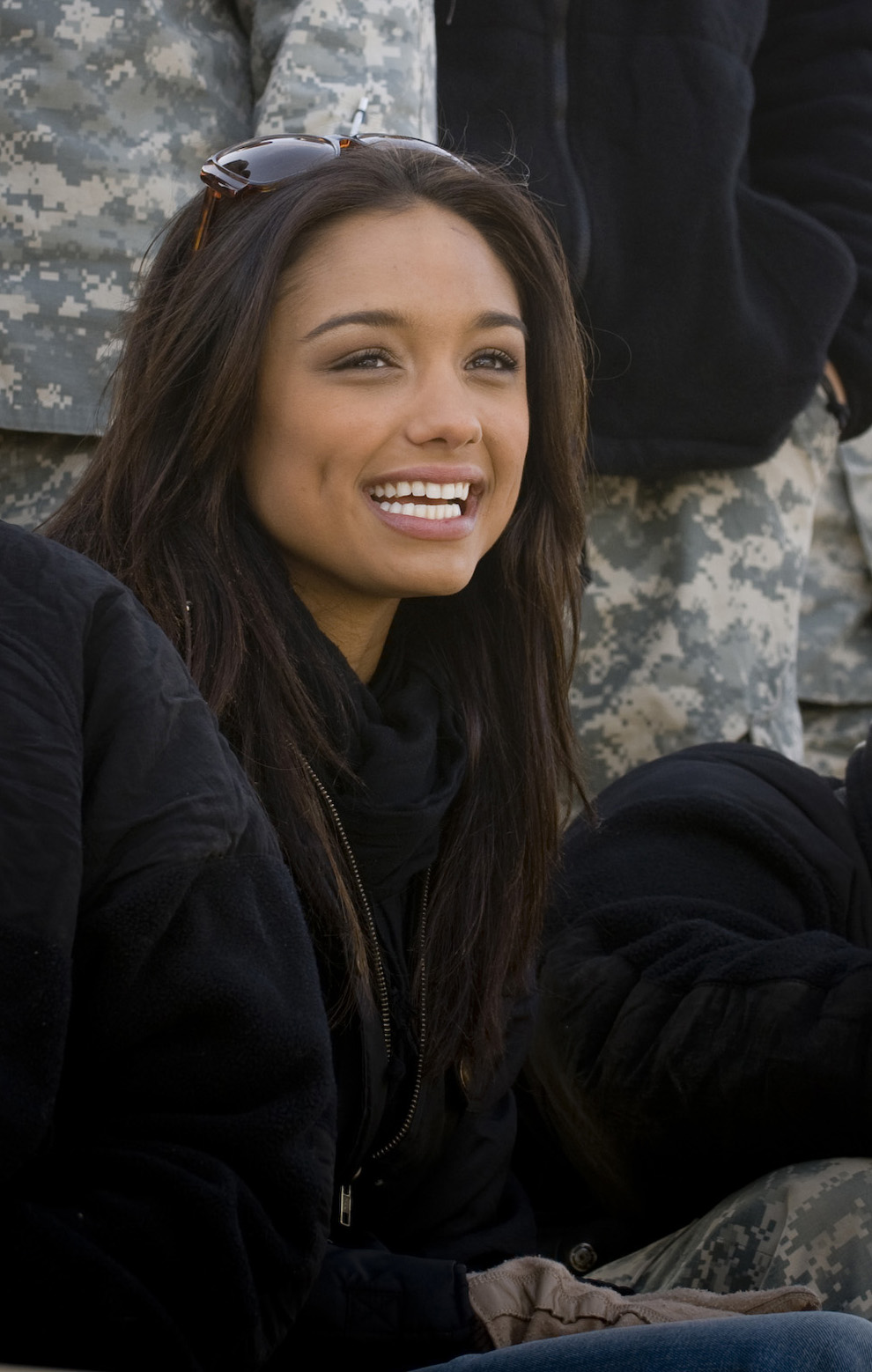
Rachel Smith, Miss Tennessee Teen USA 2002 and Miss USA 2007 (image taken in 2007)

The Miss Tennessee Teen USA competition is the pageant that selects the representative for the state Tennessee in the Miss Teen USA pageant. The pageant is directed by Greenwood Productions under the ownership of Miss Tennessee USA 1989, Kimberly Payne Greenwood, since 1992.

Tennessee is in the top 5 most successful states at Miss Teen USA in terms of number and value of placements . In the 1990s, they were placed first . They have the third (equal) highest number of semi-finalist (or better) placings and are one of only five states to have received more than three awards .

Six Tennessee teens have gone on to win the Miss Tennessee USA title and compete at Miss USA, including Lynnette "Lynn" Cole, who won the Miss USA title in 2000 and Rachel Smith, Miss USA 2007. Both Cole and Smith won Miss Photogenic awards at Miss Teen USA, each five years prior to their Miss USA win. This makes Miss Tennessee Teen USA the only state and pageant to have two Miss USAs win the Miss Photogenic award at Miss Teen USA.

Alana Dixon of DeSoto, TX was appointed Miss Tennessee Teen USA 2026 on June 30th, 2026, after the open casting call from Thomas Brodeur, the new owner of the national pageant. She will represent Tennessee at Miss Teen USA 2026.

== Results summary ==
=== Placements ===
- Miss Teen USAs: Shelly Moore (1997), Stormi Henley (2009)
- 1st runners-up: Bridgett Jordan (1998), Alicia Selby (2003)
- 2nd runners-up: Molly Brown (1984)
- 3rd runners-up: Hannah Faith Greene (2015)
- 4th runners-up: Tiffany Stroud (2004), McKinley Farese (2022)
- Top 5: Casey Porter (2000)
- Top 6: Allison Alderson (1994), Lynnette "Lynn" Cole (1995)
- Top 10: Rachel Boston (1999), Rachel Smith (2002), Sofie Rovenstine (2018)
- Top 12: Jaime Dudney (1993)
- Top 15/16/20: Macy Erwin (2007), Kristen Rose (2010), Emily Suttle (2013), Morgan Moseley (2014), Savannah Chrisley (2016), Bailey Guy (2019), Ansley Ecker (2020), Aniston Leigh Barnette (2025)

Tennessee holds a record of 23 placements at Miss Teen USA.

=== Awards ===
- Miss Congeniality: Missy Pierce (1988)
- Miss Photogenic: Lynnette "Lynn" Cole (1995), Rachel Smith (2002)
- Best in Swimsuit: Shelly Moore (1997)
- Best in Evening Gown: Townsend Blackwell (2024)
- Best State Costume: Alana Dixon (2026)

== Winners ==
- Declared as Winner
- Ended as runner-up
- Ended as one of the finalists or semifinalists

Year	Name	Hometown	Age^{1}	Local title	Placement at Miss Teen USA	Special awards at Miss Teen USA	Notes
2026	Alana Dixon	DeSoto, TX	18	Miss Owasso Teen		Best State Costume	
2025	Aniston Leigh Barnette	Bristol	17	Miss Bristol Teen	Top 20		
2024	Townsend Blackwell	Lakeland	16	Miss Lakeland Teen	3rd runner-up	Best in Evening Gown	
2023	Blye Allen	Knoxville	16	Miss Marble City Teen	Top 20		
2022	McKinley Farese	Germantown	18	Miss Memphis Teen	4th runner-up		Later Miss All American 2026
2021	Annie Zhao	Memphis	16	Miss Greater Memphis Teen			First Asian American Miss Tennessee Teen USA: Later Miss Tennessee Teen Volunteer 2023
2020	Ansley Ecker	Atoka	18	Miss Memphis Teen	Top 16		Previously Miss Tennessee High School America 2017; Miss Kansas High School America 2018; Miss Connecticut High School America 2019
2019	Bailey Guy	Hendersonville	16	Miss Greater Nashville Teen	Top 15		Previously 1st runner-up at Miss Tennessee's Outstanding Teen 2018: Later USA National Teen 2021
2018	Sofie Rovenstine	Franklin	18	Miss Historic Franklin Teen	Top 10		Later Victoria's Secret model
2017	Megan Ski Hollingsworth	Lewisburg	18	Miss Marshall County Teen			Later 2nd runner-up at Miss Tennessee USA 2019
2016	Savannah Chrisley	Nashville	18	Miss Greater Nashville Teen	Top 15		Daughter of Todd Chrisley. Appears on Chrisley Knows Best.
2015	Hannah Faith Greene	Chattanooga	17	Miss Scenic City Teen	3rd runner-up		Previously 4th runner-up at Miss Tennessee's Outstanding Teen 2014
2014	Morgan Moseley	Johnson City	15	Miss East Tennessee Teen	Top 15		
2013	Emily Suttle	Franklin	16	Miss Historic Franklin Teen	Top 16		Later Miss Tennessee USA 2022; Top 12 at Miss USA 2022
2012	Shanese Brown	Madison	16	Miss Voice of Tennessee Teen			Originally first runner-up; assumed the title after Samara Ham's disqualification
2012	Samara Ham	Crossville	17	Miss Spirit of The South Teen	Did not compete		Dethroned the title due to topless photography and disqualified
2011	Kaitlin White	Nashville	18	Miss Southern Tennessee Teen			
2010	Kristen Rose	Bristol	18	Miss East Tennessee Teen	Top 15		Later 1st runner-up at Miss Tennessee USA 2014
2009	Stormi Henley	Crossville	18	Miss Cumberland County Teen	Miss Teen USA 2009		
2008	Natalie Phillips	Murfreesboro	17	Miss Middle Tennessee Teen			
2007	Macy Erwin	Chattanooga	17	Miss Hamilton County Teen	Top 15		Contestant on ABC's America's Prom Queen
2006	Ashley Durham	Adamsville	16	Miss Adamsville Teen			Later Miss Tennessee USA 2011; 1st runner-up at Miss USA 2011
2005	Tessa Reyes	Brentwood	18				
2004	Tiffany Stroud	Limestone	16		4th runner-up		
2003	Alicia Selby	Sparta	17		1st runner-up		
2002	Rachel Renee Smith	Clarksville	17		Semi-finalist	Miss Photogenic	Later Miss Tennessee USA; Miss USA 2007; 4th runner-up at Miss Universe 2007
2001	Jessica Myers	Maryville	19				
2000	Casey Porter	McMinnville	17		Top 5		Later 1st runner-up at Miss Tennessee USA 2006
1999	Rachel Boston	Chattanooga	17		Semi-finalist		Actress best known for her portrayal of Beth Pryor in the NBC series American Dreams
1998	Bridgett Jordan	Collierville	18		1st runner-up		Winner of Miss Oktoberfest 1999; Miss Teen All American 1996
1997	Shelly Moore	Knoxville	18		Miss Teen USA 1997	Best in Swimsuit	
1996	Adrienne Parker	Newport	18				
1995	Lynnette Marie "Lynn" Cole	Columbia	17		Top 6	Miss Photogenic	Later Miss Tennessee USA; Miss USA 2000; Finished 5th at Miss Universe 2000; 3rd runner up at Miss Oktoberfest 1998; Miss Teen All American 1997
1994	Allison Alderson	Jackson	18		Top 6		Triple Crown winner: Later Miss Tennessee 1999; Later Miss Tennessee USA 2002; Sister of Miss District of Columbia USA 1999, Amy Alderson
1993	Jaime Dudney	Whites Creek	17		Semi-finalist		Daughter of Barbara Mandrell. Played Georgia Tucker on As the World Turns.
1992	Angela Shoulders	Carthage	16				
1991	Tris Sax	Memphis	18				
1990	Kristen Cassell	Blountville	18				
1989	Amy Sims	Sharon	15				
1988	Missy Pierce	Reelfoot Lake	17			Miss Congeniality	
1987	Shannon Lynn Castle	McMinnville	17				
1986	Wendy Marie Laws	Elizabethton	17				
1985	Cammy Jo Wood	Bartlett	18				Participated in Miss Tennessee 1987
1984	Molly Brown	Loretto	16		2nd runner-up		Later Miss Tennessee USA 1987
1983	Cheri Dotson	Waverly	16				

^{1} Age at the time of the Miss Teen USA pageant
