= Lynnette Cole =

American beauty pageant titleholder

- Born: Lynnette Marie Cole; February 9, 1978 (age 48); Columbia, Tennessee, U.S.
- Beauty pageant titleholder
- Title: Miss Tennessee Teen USA 1995; Miss Tennessee USA 2000; Miss USA 2000
- Major competitions: Miss Tennessee Teen USA 1995; (Winner); Miss Teen USA 1995; (Top 6); Miss Teen All American 1997; (Winner); Miss Tennessee USA 2000; (Winner); Miss USA 2000; (Winner); Miss Universe 2000; (Top 5)

Lynnette Marie O'Nan (née Cole; born February 9, 1978) is an American director, former model and beauty pageant titleholder who won the title Miss Tennessee USA 2000. She went on to become the first woman from that state to win the Miss USA 2000 pageant, she represented the United States at Miss Universe 2000, was one of placed in the Top 5 finalist.

Cole is from Columbia, Tennessee and was twenty-one years old when she won the national crown.

== Family background ==
Cole is of Puerto Rican heritage.

== Pageants ==
Cole's first major pageant win came in 1995 when she won the title Miss Tennessee Teen USA. She was a top six finalist at the Miss Teen USA pageant in that year, and won the Miss Photogenic award, finishing fourth overall. Cole later won the 1997 Miss Teen All American title.

After winning Miss Tennessee USA Cole competed for and won the title of Miss USA 2000, becoming the second Hispanic woman to win Miss USA after Laura Harring at Miss USA 1985. Cole went on to compete at the Miss Universe pageant, held in Nicosia, Cyprus later that year. Her national costume was a Vegas showgirl. Her performance was enough to secure her a spot among the five finalists, and brought the US back into the semifinals (after Kimberly Pressler had failed to advance the year before, breaking a streak of consecutive placements that had been going since 1977). She also placed fifth overall. She became the first woman to place in the top five at all three pageants and her record was not surpassed until 2006 by Tara Conner.

Cole has directed a local preliminary for Miss Tennessee USA.

Awards and achievements
Preceded by (South Africa) Sonia Raciti	Miss Universe 4th runner-up 2000	Succeeded by (India) Celina Jaitly
Preceded by Kimberly Pressler New York	Miss USA; 2000	Succeeded by Kandace Krueger Texas
Preceded by Morgan Tandy High	Miss Tennessee USA; 2000	Succeeded by Lisa Tollett
Preceded by Allison Alderson	Miss Tennessee Teen USA; 1995	Succeeded by Adrienne Parker
