= Miss USA 1969 =

18th Miss USA pageant

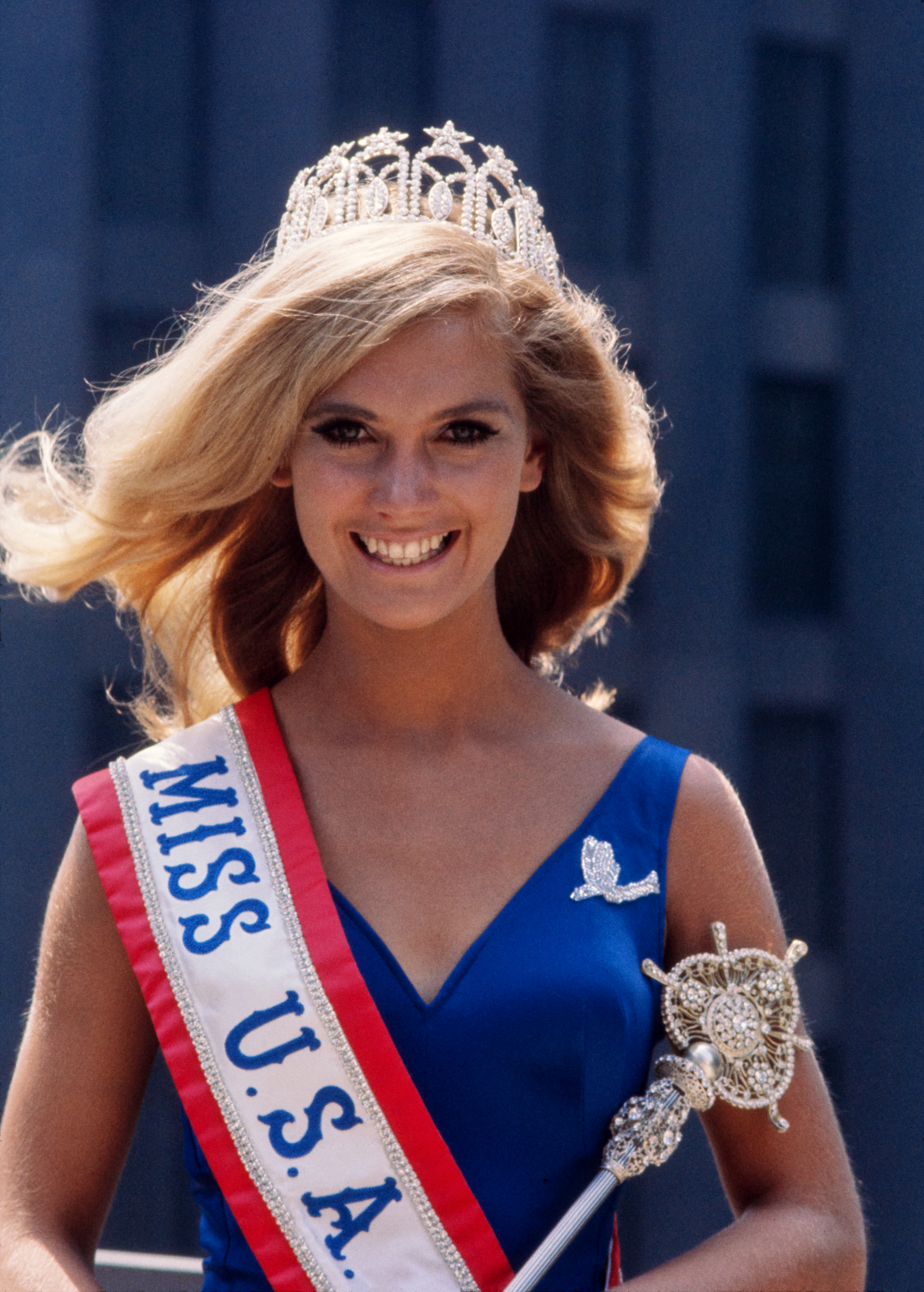
- Wendy Dascomb as Miss USA 1969
- Date: May 24, 1969
- Presenters: Bob Barker
- Venue: Miami Beach, Florida
- Broadcaster: CBS, WTVJ
- Entrants: 51
- Placements: 15
- Winner: Wendy Dascomb; Virginia

Miss USA 1969 was the 18th Miss USA pageant, televised live by CBS from Miami Beach, Florida on May 24, 1969.

The pageant was won by Wendy Dascomb of Virginia, who was crowned by outgoing titleholder Dorothy Anstett of Washington. Dascomb was the first woman from Virginia to win the Miss USA title, and went on to place as a semi-finalist at Miss Universe 1969.

== Results ==
| Final results | Contestant |
|---|---|
| Miss USA 1969 | Virginia – Wendy Dascomb |
| 1st Runner-Up | Vermont – Mary Verdiani |
| 2nd Runner-Up | South Carolina – Eva Engle |
| 3rd Runner-Up | Arizona – Ruth Boykin Harris |
| 4th Runner-Up | California – Troas Kaye Hayes |

== Delegates ==
The Miss USA 1969 delegates were:

- Alabama – Hitsy Parnell
- Alaska – Linda Rowley
- Arizona – Ruth Harris
- Arkansas – Leonette Reed
- California - Troas Kaye Hayes
- Colorado – Susan Hawkins
- Connecticut – Elizabeth Wanderman
- Delaware – Marsha Stoppel
- (Washington, D.C.) District of Columbia – Shelley Gosman
- Florida – Maria Junquera
- (Georgia (U.S. state)) Georgia – Judy Lyons
- Hawaii – Stephanie Quintana
- Idaho – Karen Tall
- Illinois – Christine Jalloway
- Indiana – Linda Lee Smith
- Iowa – Becky Stoner
- Kansas – Molly McGugin
- Kentucky – Regina Pryor
- Louisiana – Patricia Dupre
- Maine – Elaine Bolduc
- Maryland – Ardis Fowler
- Massachusetts – Martha Cawley
- Michigan – Lisa Brenner
- Minnesota – Laureen Darling
- Mississippi – Rose Marie Ray
- Missouri – Cherrie Hofmann
- Montana – Christina Jovin
- Nebraska – Marilyn Poole
- Nevada – Karen Esslinger
- New Hampshire – Dorothy Connors
- New Jersey – Nancy Fromel
- New Mexico – Mary Gard
- (New York (state)) New York – Rosemary Hradek
- North Carolina – Faye Bass
- North Dakota – Beckee Benz
- Ohio – Marlynn Singleton
- Oklahoma – Deborah Federson
- Oregon – Karen Morton
- Pennsylvania – Marlene Vaughn
- Rhode Island – Donna Lewis
- South Carolina – Eva Engle
- South Dakota – Mary Catherine Bergren
- Tennessee – Suzie Richardson
- Texas – Sandy Drewes
- Utah – Anne Mueller
- Vermont – Mary Verdiani
- Virginia – Wendy Dascomb
- (Washington (state)) Washington – Deborah Gieberson
- West Virginia – Betty Grimmer
- Wisconsin – Christine Sachen
- Wyoming – Pam Lewis
