= Miss USA 1970 =

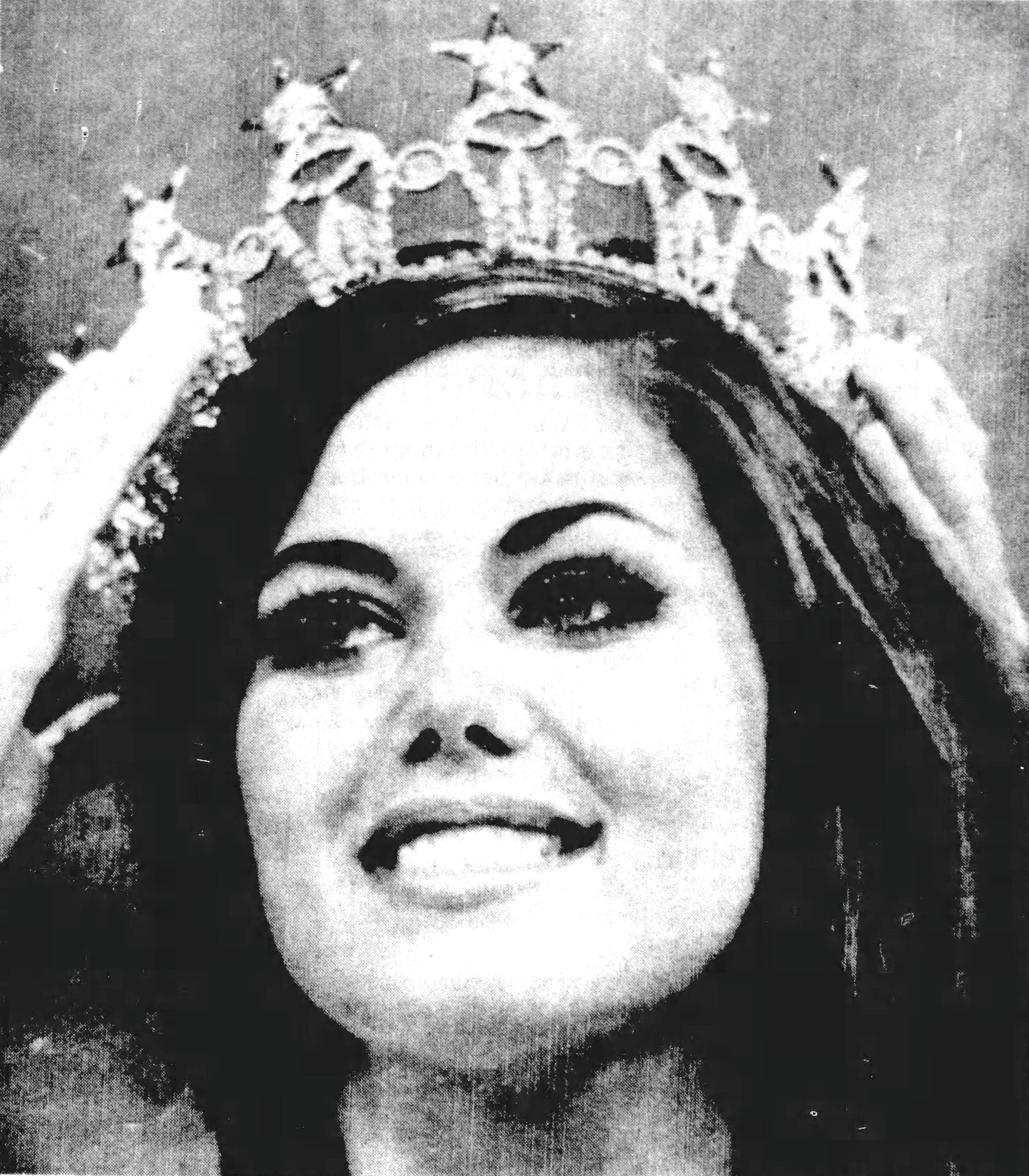
- Debbie Shelton being crowned Miss USA 1970
- Date: May 16, 1970
- Presenters: Bob Barker
- Entertainment: Ricky Nelson and The Stone Canyon Band
- Venue: Miami Beach, Florida
- Broadcaster: CBS, WTVJ
- Entrants: 51
- Placements: 15
- Winner: Deborah Shelton; Virginia
- Congeniality: Diane Swendeman; Texas
- Photogenic: Deborah Shelton; Virginia

Miss USA 1970 was the 19th Miss USA pageant, televised live by CBS from Miami Beach, Florida on May 16, 1970.

The pageant was won by Deborah Shelton of Virginia, who was crowned by outgoing titleholder Wendy Dascomb, also of Virginia – the first time in Miss USA history that a state won back-to-back titles. Shelton went on to place as 1st runner-up at Miss Universe 1970. She later became an actress who appeared in the film Body Double and on a number of television series, including Dallas.

== Results ==
Final Results	Contestant
Miss USA 1970	Virginia – Deborah Shelton
1st Runner-Up	South Carolina – Vicki Chesser
2nd Runner-Up	Nevada – Sharon "Sheri" Schruhl
3rd Runner-Up	Tennessee – Donna Marie Ford
4th Runner-Up	(Georgia (U.S. state)) Georgia – Cherie Stephens
Top 15	Arkansas – Mary Jane Dial; California – Linda Hall; (Washington, D.C.) District of Columbia – Nikki Phillips; Florida – Cheryl Johnson; Maine – Margaret McAleer; (New York (state)) New York – Christina Tefft; Ohio – Jane Harrison; Oregon – Laura Smith; Texas – Diane Swendeman; (Washington (state)) Washington – Susan Hyde

== Delegates ==
The Miss USA 1970 delegates were:

- Alabama – Kathy Bryant
- Alaska – Therese Press
- Arizona – Alicia Ellen Lein
- Arkansas – Mary Jane Dial
- California - Linda Lee Hall
- Colorado – Linda Hicklin
- Connecticut – Patricia Ann Matthews
- Delaware – Marilyn O'Neill
- (Washington, D.C.) District of Columbia – Nikki Phillips
- Florida – Cheryl Johnson
- (Georgia (U.S. state)) Georgia – Cherie Stephens
- Hawaii – Donna Hartley
- Idaho – Kathy Cravens
- Illinois – Carol Pepoon
- Indiana – Mary Ann McBride
- Iowa – Jacqueline Jochims
- Kansas – Norma Decker
- Kentucky – Joanna Smith
- Louisiana – Nadine Robertson
- Maine – Margaret McAleer
- Maryland – Beckie-Ann Price
- Massachusetts – Cheryl Lee Stankiewicz
- Michigan – Daune Bergen
- Minnesota – Sally Strickland
- Mississippi – Susan Ladner
- Missouri – Suzette Grinham
- Montana – Moreen Murphy
- Nebraska – Bonnie McElveen
- Nevada – Sharon "Sheri" Schruhl
- New Hampshire – Gail Erickson
- New Jersey – Ellen Cream
- New Mexico – Theresa Phillips
- (New York (state)) New York – Christina Tefft
- North Carolina – Susan Bodsford
- North Dakota – Nancy Jean Perry
- Ohio – Jane Harrison
- Oklahoma – Haroldy Walkup
- Oregon – Laura Smith
- Pennsylvania – Carol Cerully
- Rhode Island – Rebecca Galleshaw
- South Carolina – Vicki Chesser
- South Dakota – Cynthia Finley
- Tennessee – Donna Marie Ford
- Texas – Diane Swendeman
- Utah – Tamina Roark
- Vermont – Cynthia Jurewicz
- Virginia – Deborah Shelton
- (Washington (state)) Washington – Susan Joan Hyde
- West Virginia – Sharon Alberti
- Wisconsin – Jo Ann Soller
- Wyoming – Elizabeth Ann Swarthout
