= Laipply =

Laipply is a surname. Notable people with the surname include:

- Judson Laipply (born 1976), American motivational speaker and dancer
- Julie Laipply (born 1978), American author and role model
