= Barnette =

Barnette is a surname. Notable people with the surname include:

- Elbridge Truman Barnette, (1863–1933) American adventurer
- Lauren Barnette (born 1985), American pageant contestant
- Michael C. Barnette (born 1971), American sea diver
- Neema Barnette (born 1949), American director
- Tony Barnette (born 1983), American baseball player

== See also ==
- Barnette's conjecture, unsolved math problem
- West Virginia State Board of Education v. Barnette, a United States Supreme Court case about compelled speech in public schools
