= Wendy Dascomb =

American model (born 1950)

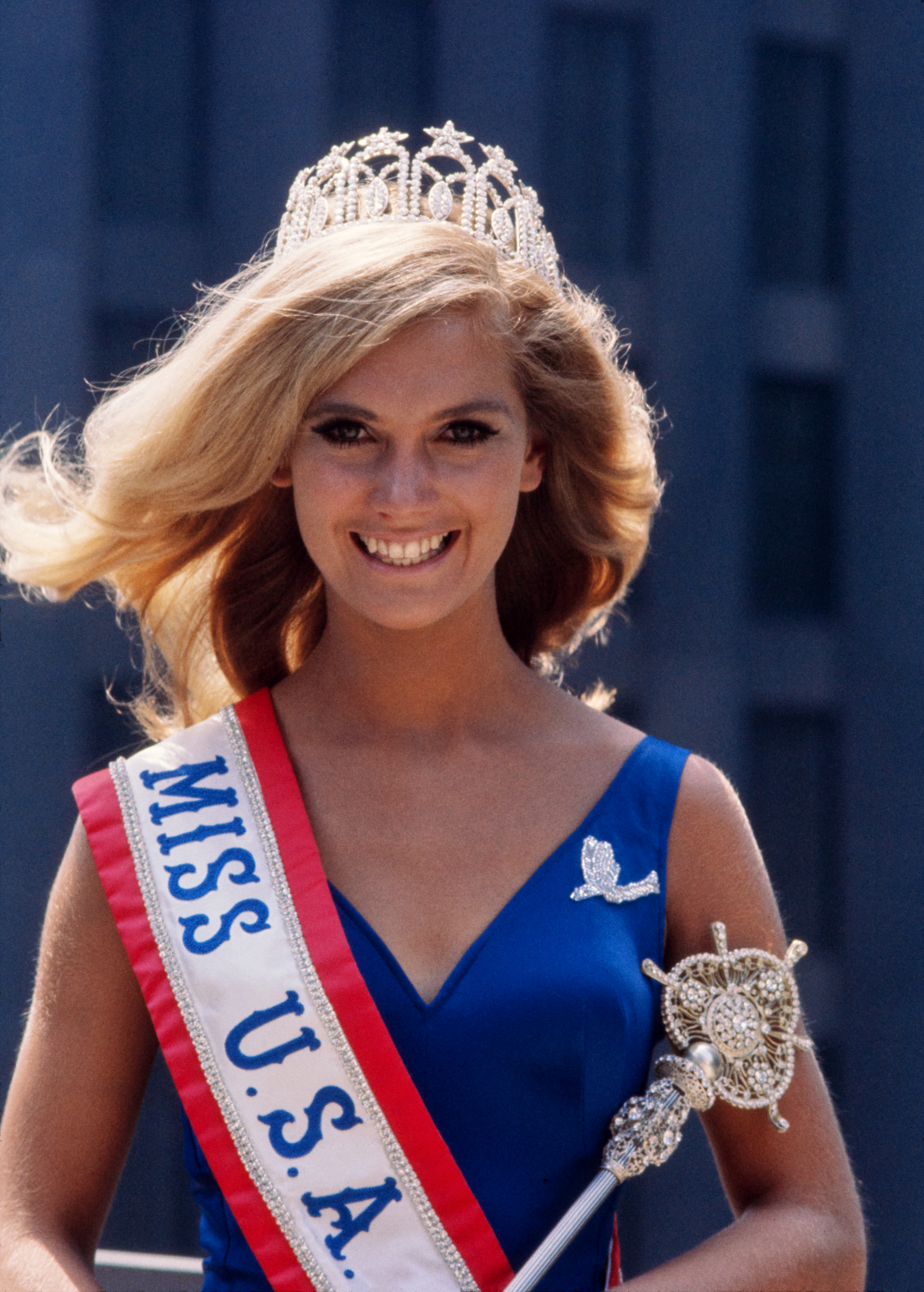
- Dascomb in 1969
- Born: Wendy Jane Dascomb; January 7, 1950 (age 76); Metairie, Louisiana, U.S.
- Education: University of North Carolina at Chapel Hill
- Height: 5 ft 9 in (1.75 m)
- Spouse: Jay Bryan
- Children: 5
- Beauty pageant titleholder
- Title: Miss Virginia USA 1969; Miss USA 1969
- Hair color: Blonde
- Eye color: Blue
- Major competitions: Miss USA 1969 (Winner); Miss Universe 1969 (Top 15)

Wendy Jane Dascomb (born January 7, 1950) is an American model and beauty pageant titleholder who was crowned Miss USA 1969. As Miss USA, she represented the United States at Miss Universe 1969, placing in the top fifteen. Dascomb had previously been crowned Miss Virginia USA 1969, becoming the first woman from Virginia to be crowned Miss USA.

== Early life and education ==
Dascomb was born in Metairie, Louisiana. After graduating from high school, Dascomb enrolled in Stratford College in Danville, Virginia, where she studied liberal arts and wished to become a special education teacher. She later enrolled in the University of North Carolina at Chapel Hill, receiving a degree in comparative religion and philosophy.

== Pageantry ==
Dascomb began her career in pageantry in 1969, as a college freshman. After being convinced by her school's faculty, Dascomb opted to compete in the Miss Piedmont beauty pageant. She went on to win the competition, which enabled her to compete for the title of Miss Virginia USA 1969. Dascomb later won the state title as well.

=== Miss USA ===
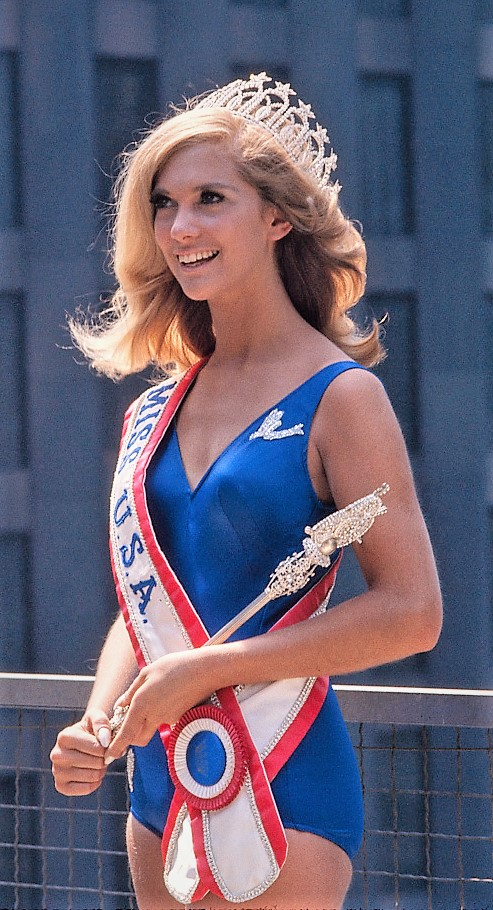
Dascomb as Miss USA 1969

After being crowned Miss Virginia USA 1969, Dascomb received the right to represent Virginia at Miss USA 1969, held in Miami Beach, Florida. In the competition, Dascomb advanced to the top fifteen, and later the top five, ultimately being crowned the winner. Her win made her the first woman from Virginia to be crowned Miss USA.

During her reign as Miss USA, Dascomb traveled to more than one hundred cities as an ambassador and model, including appearances in South America and Europe. Additionally, as part of her prize package, Dascomb received $5,000 in cash, and a variety of other prizes.

After winning Miss USA, Dascomb represented the United States at Miss Universe 1969, also held in Miami Beach. She placed in the top fifteen, and the competition was won by Gloria Diaz of the Philippines. Dascomb crowned Deborah Shelton, also of Virginia, as her successor at the Miss USA 1970 pageant. During her farewell address, Dascomb delivered an impromptu speech speaking of her disillusionment with the pageant and how she learned that beauty pageants were "all wrapped up in selling – sell me, sell a swimsuit". Dascomb later went on to state that she "was not the best Miss USA," but that she "was the most honest". In an interview after giving up her crown, Dascomb stated that she was excited to return to college in order to be with people who "share [her] views".

In 1972, Dascomb contributed an article for Ms., in which she wrote of her experience as Miss USA and elaborated further on her disillusionment over the pageant and her role as a titleholder, additionally being featured on the cover of the magazine's first issue. In 2011, during an interview with Time, Dascomb recalled how she was often at odds with pageant organizers due to her outspokenness against the Vietnam War and support of women's rights due to her alignment with the hippie subculture, adding that they thought she "should be perfect and have scripted answers" while calling herself "a real rebel".

== Personal life ==
Dascomb has resided on a farm in Chapel Hill, North Carolina, together with her husband Jay Bryan since the 1990s. Dascomb and Bryan have five children; three are Dascomb's from her first marriage, and two are Bryan's from his marriage with his late wife. Dascomb and Bryan also have six grandchildren.
