= Miss Virginia Teen USA =

- Formation: 1983
- Type: Beauty pageant
- Headquarters: Richmond
- Location: Virginia
- Members: Miss Teen USA
- Official language: English
- Key people: Darrell Williams, Executive Director Kyle Kelley, Assistant Director; Lacie Ross, Assistant Director Sheatiel Carter, Assistant Director
- Website: Official website

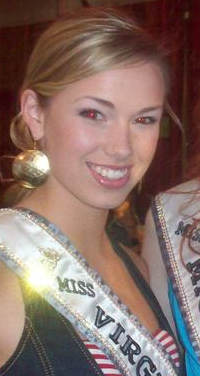
Megan Myrehn, Miss Virginia Teen USA 2008

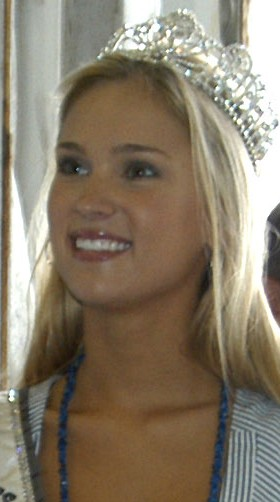
Samantha Casey, Miss Virginia Teen USA 2006

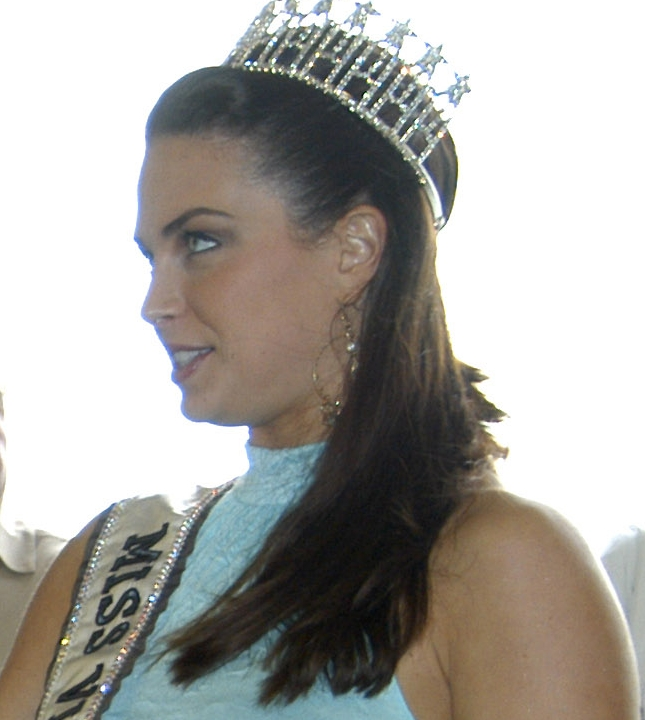
Miss Virginia Teen USA 2003 and Miss Virginia USA 2006 Amber Copley

The Miss Virginia Teen USA competition is the pageant that selects the representative for the state of Virginia in the Miss Teen USA pageant.

Virginia is one of the more successful states at Miss Teen USA, and is placed in the top twenty in terms of number and value of placements . Their most successful decade was the 1980s.

No Miss Virginia Teen USA has won the Miss Teen USA crown, but their highest placement came in the first year of competition, when Tina Marrocco placed 1st runner-up to Ruth Zakarian of New York.

Virginia ties the record for the most Teens to cross over to win the Miss Virginia USA title and compete at Miss USA with eleven in all, two others have later been crowned in other states, Indiana and North Carolina. One of these is Kristi Lauren Glakas, a Triple Crown winner who competed at Miss USA 2004 and placed 3rd runner-up at Miss America 2006.

The current titleholder is Madyson Blizzard of Purcellville, was crowned on July 18, 2026, at Hilton McLean Tysons Corner in McLean. She will represent Virginia at Miss Teen USA 2026.

== Results summary ==
=== Placements ===
- 1st runner-up: Tina Marrocco (1983)
- 3rd runners-up: Angela Thigpin (1986), Samantha "Sam" Casey (2006)
- Top 5: Misty Horn (1998)
- Top 10: Kimberly "Kim" Grigsby (1997), Kristi Lauren Glakas (1999), Tori Hall (2005), Emily Bruce (2007), Madyson Blizzard (2026)
- Top 12: Andrea Ballengee (1992)
- Top 15: Megan Myrehn (2008), Jacqueline Carroll (2010)
- Top 20: Ashley Wang (2023), Julia Allen (2024)

Virginia holds a record of 14 placements at Miss Teen USA.

== Winners ==
- Declared as Winner
- Ended as runner-up
- Ended as one of the finalists or semifinalists

Year	Name	Hometown	Age^{1}	Local title	Placement at Miss Teen USA	Special awards at Miss Teen USA	Notes
2026	Madyson Blizzard	Purcellville	19	Miss Spirit of Volunteer Teen	Top 10		
2025	Emma McReynolds	Coeburn	18	Miss Wise County Teen			
2024	Julia Allen	Lynchburg	17	Miss Spirit of Volunteer Teen	Top 20		
2023	Ashley Wang	Herndon	16	Miss Herndon Teen	Top 20		First Chinese American Miss Virginia Teen USA
2022	Hannah Grau	Fredericksburg	17	Miss Fredericksburg Teen			
2021	Alyssa Mawyer	Broadway	18	Miss Broadway Teen			Previously Miss High School America 2019
2020	Amya Caldwell	Ashburn	16	Miss Old Dominion Teen			
2019	Morgan Brooke Duty	Lebanon	16	Miss Lebanon Teen			
2018	Himanvi Preeti Panidepu	Centreville	17	Miss Central Virginia Teen			First Asian American and first East Indian American Miss Virginia Teen-USA: Later Miss Virginia USA 2024; Top 10 at Miss USA 2024
2017	Madison Walker	Virginia Beach	16	Miss Chesapeake Teen			
2016	Gracyn Blackmore	Bristol	16				
2015	Annie "Ann" Kutyna	Herndon	15				
2014	Olivia Fletcher	Louisa	16				
2013	Caelynn Miller-Keyes	Fredericksburg	17				Later Miss North Carolina USA 2018; First runner up at Miss USA 2018.; Contestant on season 23 of The Bachelor and season 6 of Bachelor in Paradise
2012	Elizabeth Coakley	Abingdon	17				
2011	Susie Evans	Poquoson	17				Later Miss Virginia USA 2020; Winner of season 26 of The Bachelor
2010	Jacqueline Carroll	Stanardsville	16		Top 15		Later Miss Virginia USA 2017
2009	Maggie Lawson	Bristol	18				
2008	Megan Leigh Myrehn	Catharpin	18		Top 15		Later Miss Indiana USA 2012
2007	Emily Bruce	Lynchburg	17		Top 10		
2006	Samantha Evelyn "Sam" Casey	Jeffersonton	17	Miss Jeffersonton Teen	3rd runner-up		Later Miss Virginia USA 2010; Second runner up at Miss USA 2010
2005	Victoria Marie "Tori" Hall	Midlothian	18		Top 10		Later Miss Virginia USA 2008; Cast member on Road Rules 2007: Viewers' Revenge
2004	Mally Paige Gent	Honaker	18				
2003	Amber Brooke Copley	Abingdon	18				Later Miss Virginia USA 2006
2002	Lauren Elizabeth Barnette	Wise	17				Later Miss Virginia USA 2007, Top 10 at Miss USA 2007; Model on NBC's Deal or No Deal
2001	Kathleen Lighthiser	Staunton	16				
2000	Jennifer Hawkins	Lynchburg	17				
1999	Kristi Lauren Glakas	Centreville	18		Semi-finalist		Triple Crown winner: Later Miss Virginia USA 2004 and Miss Virginia 2005, 3rd runner up to Miss America 2006
1998	Misty Rene Horn	Richlands	18		Top 5		
1997	Kimberly Elizabeth "Kim" Grigsby	Richmond	18		Semi-finalist		
1996	Kandy Marshall	Richmond	16				
1995	Kristel Jenkins	Vinton	17				Later Miss Virginia USA 2001
1994	Christin Brooke Wilson	Bristol	17				
1993	Heather Dawn Anderson	Richmond	17				
1992	Andrea Ballengee	Richmond	19		Semi-finalist		Crowned Miss Virginia 1995 but was disqualified when it was discovered that she had embellished her academic record; later Mrs California 2006 and Mrs America 2006 (top ten at Mrs World 2006) married name Andrea Preuss.
1991	Linda Overhue	Richmond	16				
1990	Yuranda Harris	Richmond	19				
1989	Stephanie Satterfield	Virginia Beach	15				Later Miss Virginia USA 1993
1988	Audra Elizabeth Wilks	Richmond	17				Later Miss Virginia USA 1997
1987	Kristi Renee Pearce	Colonial Heights	15				
1986	Angela Thigpen	Portsmouth	15		3rd runner-up		
1985	Alice Robinson	Richmond	17				
1984	Marcy Brickhouse	Virginia Beach	16				
1983	Tina Marrocco	McLean	16		1st runner-up		

^{1} Age at the time of the Miss Teen USA pageant
