= Kasey Montgomery =

American beauty pageant contestant

- Born: July 20, 1983 (age 43); Petersburg, West Virginia, U.S.
- Height: 5 ft 7 in (1.70 m)
- Beauty pageant titleholder
- Title: Miss West Virginia USA 2007
- Hair color: Brown
- Eye color: Green
- Major competition: Miss USA 2007

Kasey Montgomery (born July 20, 1983) is an American beauty queen from Petersburg, West Virginia who competed in the Miss USA pageant in 2007.

Montgomery won the Miss West Virginia USA 2007 title in a state pageant held in Flatwoods on October 22, 2006. Her "sister" titleholder was Chelsea Welch of West Union. Prior to winning the title, Montgomery had competed in many other pageants in both the Miss West Virginia USA and Miss West Virginia systems. She had competed in the Miss West Virginia USA pageant in 2005 and did not place, and made the top ten in 2005. She placed in the top ten in the Miss West Virginia pageant earlier in 2006, was fourth runner-up in that competition in 2005, made the top ten in 2004 and competed but did not place in 2003. Montgomery also reigned over the 2002 West Virginia State Fair as the 2002 West Virginia Association of Fairs and Festivals Queen. Montgomery represented West Virginia in the Miss USA 2007 pageant held on March 23, 2007, in the Kodak Theatre

Montgomery is a graduate in communications at West Virginia University.

| Preceded by Jessica Wedge | Miss West Virginia USA; 2007 | Succeeded by Skylene Montgomery |
