= Julia Möller =

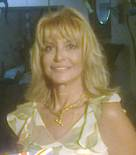
Julia Möller in 2014.

Julia Möller Roche (born 1949 in Montevideo) is a Uruguayan television presenter, former model and beauty pageant titleholder. She is a granddaughter of the late Communist senator Julia Arévalo de Roche.

In 1969 she won the pageant Miss Uruguay and was a contestant for Miss Universe.

On television she is best remembered for her program at the end of the night, Punto Final (Spanish for "end point").
