= Sangduen Manwong =

Thai beauty pageant contestant (born 1949)

- Born: Sangduen Manwong; January 1, 1949 (age 77); Bangkok, Thailand
- Height: 5 ft 4.5 in (1.64 m)
- Beauty pageant titleholder
- Title: Miss Thailand 1968
- Hair color: Black
- Eye color: Black
- Major competitions: Miss Thailand 1968 (winner), Miss Universe 1969 (delegate)

Sangduen Manwong (Thai: แสงเดือน แม้นวงศ์; RTGS: Saengduean Maenwong; nicknamed Toom Thai: ตุ๋ม; RTGS: Tum; born January 1, 1949) is a Thai former model and beauty pageant titleholder who was crowned Miss Thailand 1968. She competed in the Miss Universe 1969 pageant competition held in the United States and won best national costume.

Preceded by Apantree Prayutsenee	Miss Thailand; Miss Thailand 1968	Succeeded by Warunee Saengsirinavin
