= Patricia Southall =

American model and spokesperson

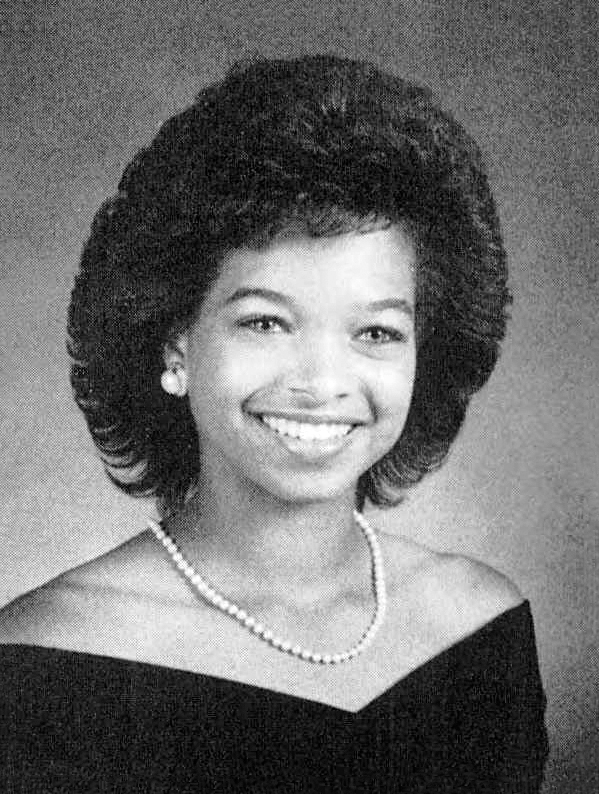
- Southall in 1988
- Born: Patricia Annette Southall; December 17, 1970 (age 55); Norfolk, Virginia, U.S.
- Title: Miss Virginia USA 1994
- Spouses: Martin Lawrence (m. 1995; div. 1997) Emmitt Smith (m. 2000; sep. 2020)
- Children: 4

Patricia Annette Southall (born December 17, 1970) is an American founder and spokesperson of Treasure You, ex-wife of comedian Martin Lawrence, and wife of former Dallas Cowboys running back and Pro Football Hall of Famer Emmitt Smith. The former beauty queen from Chesapeake, Virginia is a James Madison University journalism graduate who won the Miss Virginia USA crown in late 1993. Representing Virginia in the Miss USA 1994 pageant, Southall placed first runner-up to Lu Parker of South Carolina.

== Philanthropic work ==
Over the course of their marriage, Pat and Emmitt Smith have been significant donors to a variety of causes and non-profit organizations through Pat & Emmitt Smith Charities. In 2012, the couple's charitable organization, Pat & Emmitt Smith Charities, was among the people and organizations honored at the Trumpet Awards.

== Public speaking ==
In 2012, Women of Faith added Smith to the list of speakers for their Celebrate What Matters Tour.

== Personal life ==
Southall married actor-comedian Martin Lawrence in 1995. She and Lawrence met in the summer of 1992, while she was working in Gov. Douglas Wilder's media office. Lawrence was appearing in Richmond at a Def Comedy Jam concert. Lawrence and Southall have one child together, daughter Jasmin Page Lawrence (born January 15, 1996). They divorced in 1997.

Southall married football star Emmitt Smith on April 22, 2000. The couple divorced in 2020. They have three children together: sons Emmitt James Smith IV (born May 15, 2002) and Elijah Alexander James Smith (born September 22, 2010), and daughter Skylar Smith (born October 15, 2003). Southall is also the stepmother to Rheagen Smith (born November 2, 1998), who is Smith's daughter with ex-girlfriend Hope Wilson. She is a member of Delta Sigma Theta sorority.
