= Miss West Virginia USA =

Beauty pageant competition

- Formation: 1952
- Type: Beauty pageant
- Headquarters: Buckhannon
- Location: West Virginia
- Members: Miss USA
- Official language: English
- Website: Official website

The Miss West Virginia USA competition is the pageant that selects the representative for the state of West Virginia in the Miss USA pageant. This pageant is independently conducted and produced by Empower2 Productions LLC. and is formerly directed by Sanders & Associates, Inc., dba- Pageant Associates based in Buckhannon, West Virginia.

Although West Virginia has not produced a Miss USA titleholder, four West Virginian delegates have placed: Kristen Morrison in 2005, Jessi Pierson in 2009, Chelsea Welch in 2013, and Nichole Greene in 2016. Their most recent placement was Krystian Leonard who placed in the Top 16 in 2022.

Four Miss West Virginia USAs have held the Miss West Virginia Teen USA title and competed at Miss Teen USA, and two have competed at Miss America.

Alanna Lynch of West Liberty was crowned Miss West Virginia USA 2026 on June 13, 2026 at The Culture Center • West Virginia State Capitol Complex in Charleston. She will represent West Virginia for the title of Miss USA 2026.

== Gallery of titleholders ==
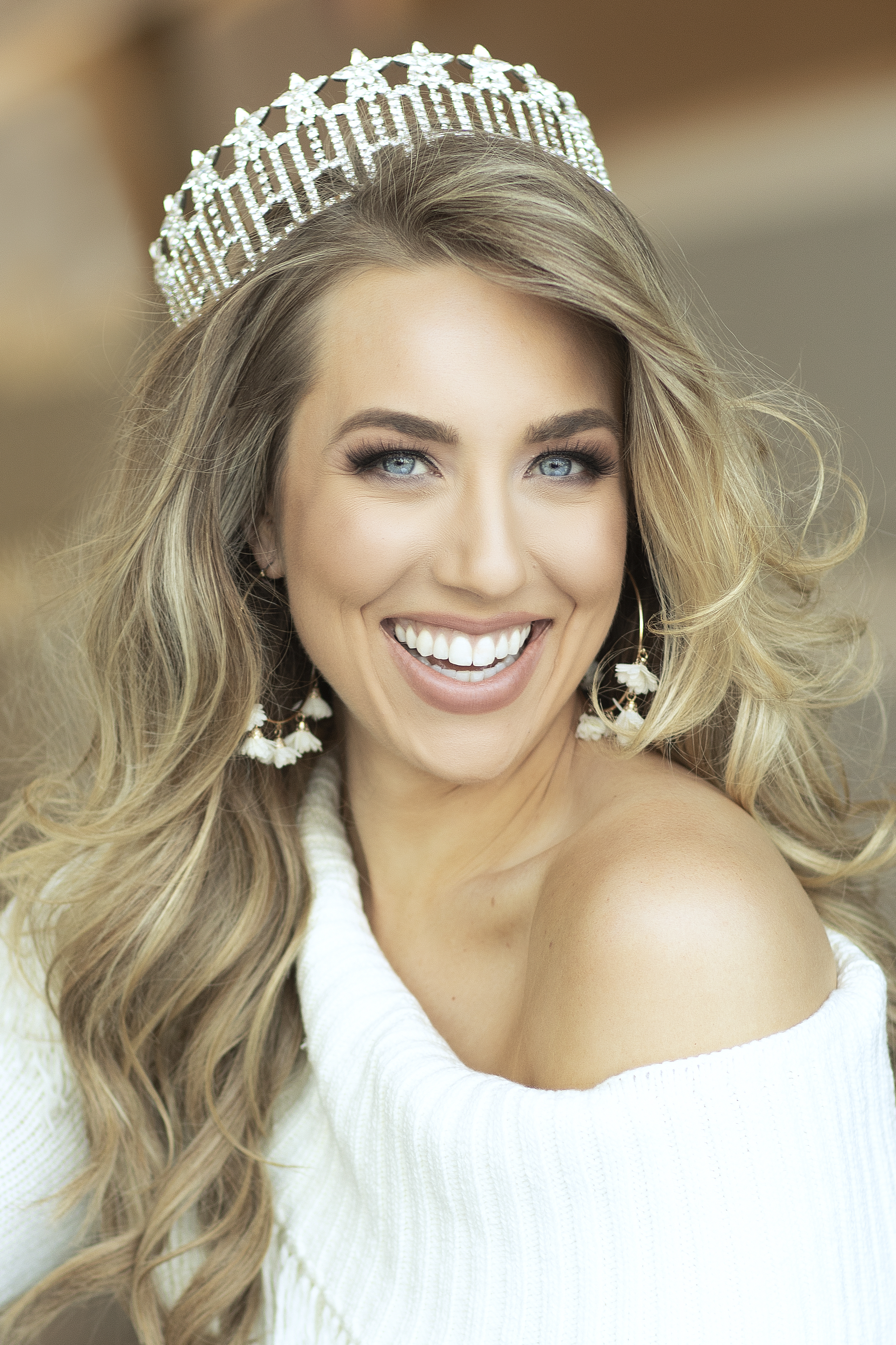
Charlotte Bellotte, Miss West Virginia USA 2020

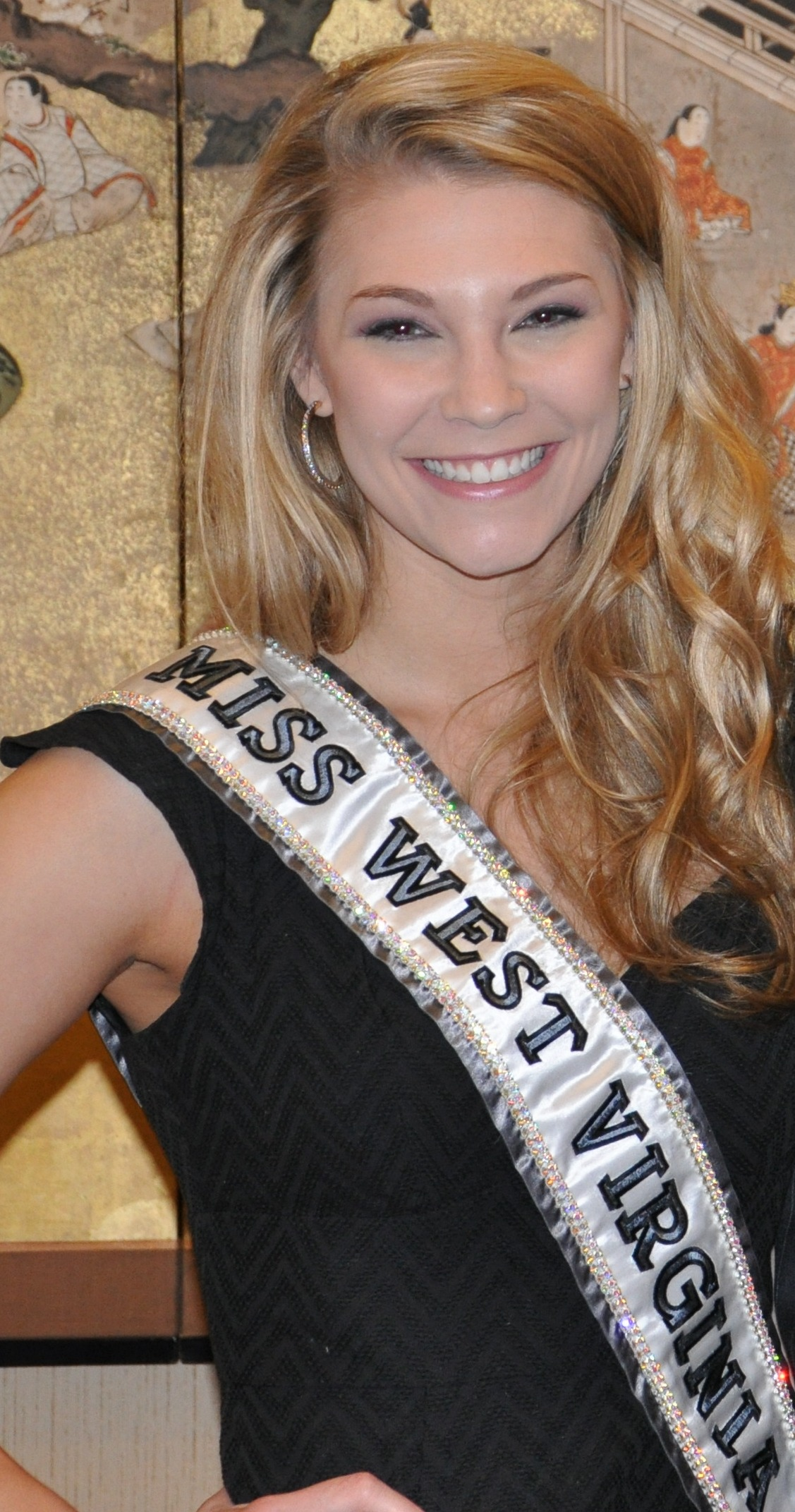
Chelsea Welch, Miss West Virginia USA 2013

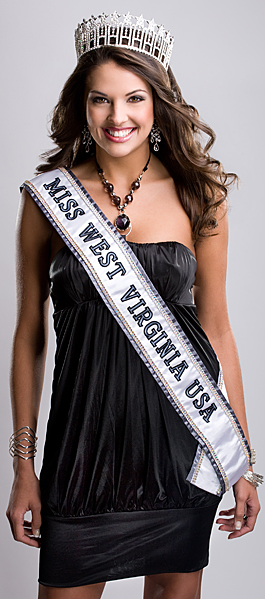
Jessi Pierson, Miss West Virginia USA 2009

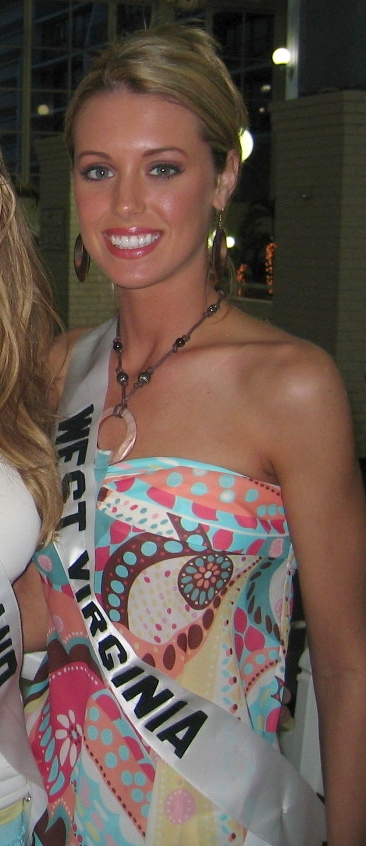
Jessica Wedge, Miss West Virginia USA 2006

== Results summary ==
=== Placements ===
- 1st runners-up: Ruth Parr (1957), Kelly Anderson (1984)
- Top 10/11: Paula Morrison (1987), Jessi Pierson (2009)
- Top 15/16: Wilda Estep (1959), Garnett Pugh (1960), Kathy McManaway (1961), Kristin Morrison (2005), Chelsea Welch (2013), Nichole Greene (2016), Krystian Leonard (2022)

West Virginia holds a record of 11 placements at Miss USA.

=== Awards ===
- Miss Photogenic: Jessi Pierson (2009)

== Winners ==
- Declared as Winner
- Ended as runner-up
- Ended as one of the finalists or semifinalists

Year	Name	Hometown	Age (Note: Age at the time of the Miss USA pageant)	Local title	Placement at Miss USA	Special awards at Miss USA	Notes
2026	Alanna Lynch	West Liberty	25	Miss West Liberty			
2025	Erin Wellman	Princeton	24	Miss Barboursville Fall Festival			
2024	Caylie Simmons	Franklin	24	Miss Three Rivers Festival			
2023	Nevaeh Harmon	Charleston	21	Miss Charleston			
2022	Krystian Leonard	Morgantown	25	Miss Monongalia County	Top 16		
2021	Alexis Bland	Parkersburg	22	Miss Parkersburg			
2020	Charlotte Bellotte	Charles Town	25				Longest reigning Miss West Virginia USA (1 year, 8 months, and 14 days)
2019	Haley Holloway	Morgantown	23				Previously Miss West Virginia Teen USA 2013; 2nd runner-up at Miss Teen USA 2013; Previously Miss West Virginia United States 2015; 1st runner-up at Miss United States 2015
2018	Casey Lassiter	Spencer	21				
2017	Lauren Roush	Mason	21				Cast member of Are You the One?; Later Miss Pennsylvania World 2019; Top 10 at Miss World America 2019
2016	Nichole Greene	Nitro	24		Top 15		
2015	Andrea Mucino	Morgantown	23				
2014	Charisse Haislop	Parkersburg	24				
2013	Chelsea Welch	West Union	22		Top 15		Previously Miss West Virginia Teen USA 2007; 4th runner-up to Miss Teen USA 2007
2012	Andrea Rogers	Martinsburg	24				
2011	Whitney Veach	Petersburg	24				Previously Miss West Virginia Teen USA 2003
2010	Erica Jade Goldsmith	Mineral Wells	23				
2009	Jessi Pierson	Milton	21		Top 10	Miss Photogenic	
2008	Skylene Montgomery	Parkersburg					Ms. West Virginia United States 2006
2007	Kasey Montgomery	Petersburg	23				
2006	Jessica Wedge	Evans	22				
2005	Kristin Morrison	Ripley	24		Top 15		Current titleholder manager of the Miss West Virginia USA and Miss West Virginia Teen USA pageants under her married name, Kristin Flowers
2004	Carolyn Jennings	Morgantown	21				
2003	Amy Thomason	Buckhannon					
2002	Angela Davenport	Montgomery					
2001	Karen Long	Barboursville					Winner of Miss Oktoberfest 2001; Auditioned for Season 1 of American Idol
2000	Tara Wilson	Sistersville					
1999	Amanda Burns						Previously Miss West Virginia Teen USA 1997; Later Mrs. West Virginia America 2004 under her married name, Amanda Duffy
1998	Susan Booth	Charleston					
1997	Natalie Bevins	Parkersburg					
1996	Regina Fisher	Glenville					
1995	Tracy Holcomb						
1994	Linda Bailey	Charleston					
1993	Jennifer Johnson	Huntington					
1992	Vickie Myers	Parkersburg					
1991	Krista Ransbottom	Huntington					
1990	Sabrina Anderson	Hinton					
1989	Kathy Eicher	Huntington					Mother of Nadia Mejia, Miss California USA 2016, and married to Gerardo Mejia
1988	Cathy Fowler	Huntington					
1987	Paula Morrison	Barboursville	22		Semi-finalist		Semifinalist at Miss International 1987
1986	Shonna Lyons	Parkersburg					
1985	Lorre Lewis	Barboursville					
1984	Kelly Anderson	Clarksburg	23		1st runner-up		Previously Miss West Virginia 1982; Top 5 finalist at Miss World 1984
1983	Jill Rigsby	Huntington					
1982	Cindy Baniak	Star City					
1981	Kelly Carr						
1980	Linda Hedrick	Wiley Ford					
1979	Candice (Candy) Boggs	Keyser	21				
1978	Deborah Davis						Later Miss West Virginia 1979
1977	Pat Brown	Shepherdstown					
1976	Cheryl Plants	Winfield					
1975	Joyce Myers	Wheeling					
1974	Kim Nuzum	Wheeling					
1973	Kathy Rowand	Pinch					
1972	Diane McCutcheon	Wheeling					
1971	Peggy Tennant	Clarksburg					
1970	Sharon Alberti	Weirton					
1969	Betty Grimmer	Wheeling					
1968	Patricia "Pat" Coyne	Wheeling					
1967	Pamela Young						
1966	Annette Peery						
1964-1965	Did Not Compete						
1963	Nina Lou Denton						
1962	Nicki Galais						
1961	Kathy McManaway				Semi-finalist		
1960	Garnett Pugh				Semi-finalist		
1959	Wilda Estep				Semi-finalist		
1958	Mary Guthrie						
1957	Ruth Parr				1st runner-up		She finished as 2nd runner-up, but succeeded as 1st runner-up when the 1st runner-up assumed the title as Miss USA after the title was taken away from the winner.
1956	Janet Cardi						
1955	Barbara Tucker						
1954	Sandra Waggy	Charleston					
1953	Fay Higley						
1952	Did Not Compete						
