= Warunee Sangsirinavin =

Thai model (born 1952)

Warunee Sangsirinawin
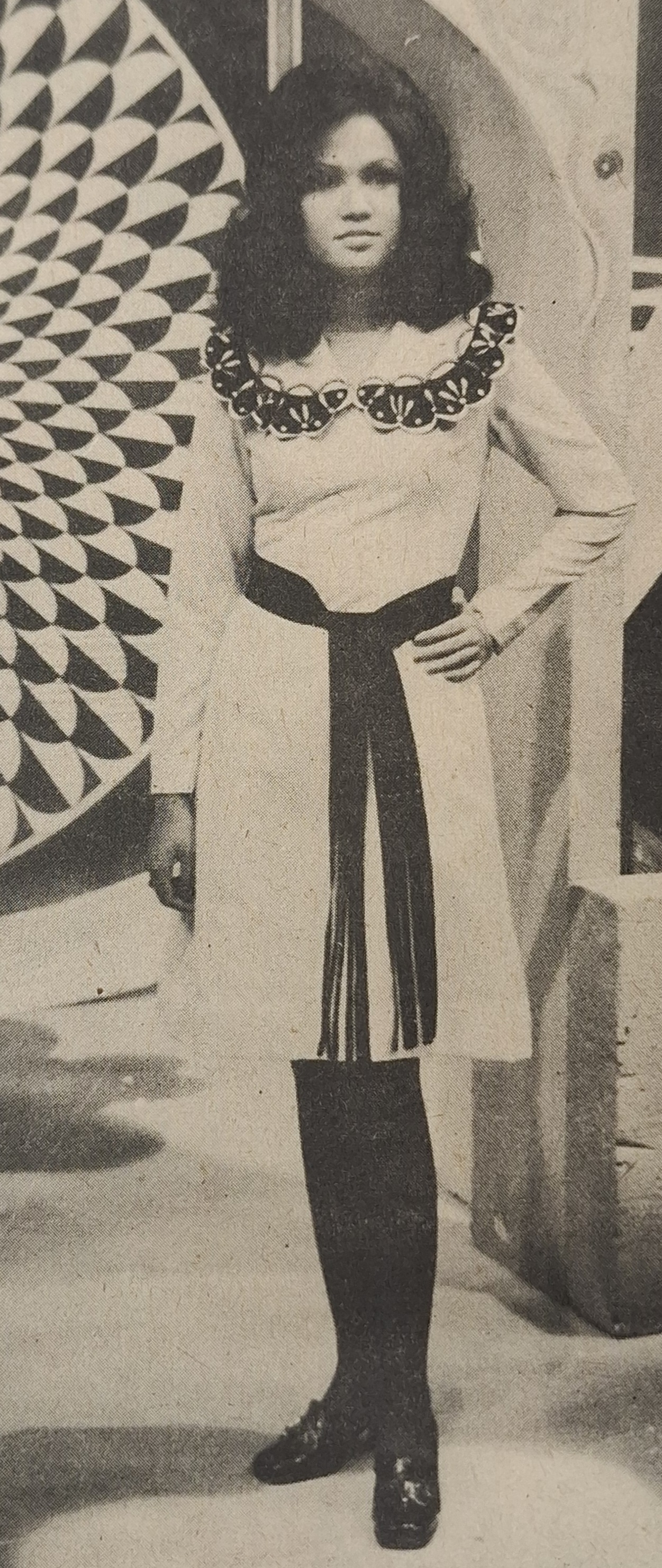
- Warunee in 1972
- Born: Warunee Sangsirinavin; July 22, 1952 (age 74); Bangkok, Thailand
- Height: 5 ft 5.5 in (1.66 m)
- Beauty pageant titleholder
- Title: Miss Thailand 1969
- Hair color: Black
- Eye color: Black
- Major competitions: Miss Thailand 1969 (Winner); Miss Universe 1970 (Withdraw); Miss Universe 1971 (Unplaced)

Warunee Sangsirinavin (Thai: วารุณี แสงศิรินาวิน; RTGS: Waruni Saengsirinawin) nicknamed Pia (Thai: เปีย) (born July 22, 1952, in Bangkok, Thailand) is a Thai beauty pageant titleholder who won Miss Thailand 1969.

Due to the cancellation of Miss Thailand pageant in 1970, Warunee represented Thailand in the Miss Universe competitions twice. Her entry for the 1970 pageant was withdrawn as she was younger than the minimum age limit. She competed in the Miss Universe 1971 but was unplaced.

She later married Tritip Telan, a businessman.

Preceded by Sangduen Manwong	Warunee Sangsirinavin; Miss Thailand 1969	Succeeded by Nipapat Sudsiri
