= Deborah Shelton =

American actress (born 1948)

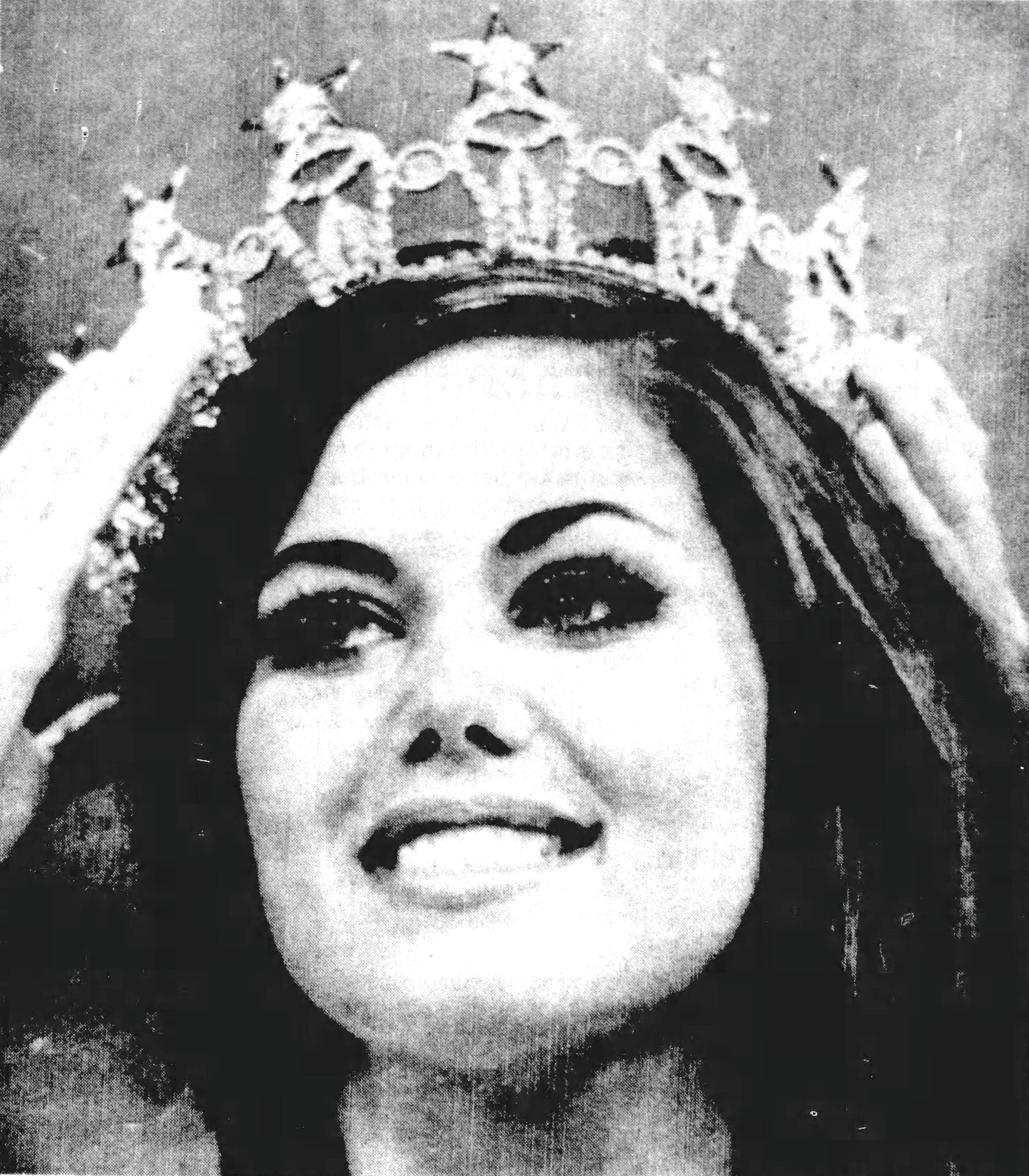
- Shelton as Miss USA 1970
- Born: Washington, D.C., U.S.
- Other name: Debbie Shelton
- Height: 5 ft 8 in (1.73 m)
- Beauty pageant titleholder
- Title: Miss Virginia World 1968 Miss Virginia USA 1970 Miss USA 1970
- Hair color: Brown
- Eye color: Green
- Major competition: Miss World USA 1968 (1st Runner-Up) Miss Virginia USA 1970 (Winner) Miss USA 1970 (Winner) (Miss Photogenic) Miss Universe 1970 (1st Runner-Up)

Deborah Shelton is an American actress and beauty pageant titleholder who was crowned Miss USA 1970. She is also known for her appearances on Dallas for three seasons, with a special guest return in 2013.

== Pageants ==
In 1970, Shelton competed in the Miss Virginia USA pageant to spite her then boyfriend. She won the title and represented Virginia in the Miss USA 1970 pageant held in Miami, Florida in May 1970.

At the pageant, Shelton won the Miss Pixable award (photogenic) and was subsequently crowned Miss USA 1970. She was crowned by former title holder Wendy Dascomb, also of Virginia; this was the first time that a state had won the Miss USA title back to back.

Shelton then went on to the Miss Universe contest in Miami, Florida in July where she placed first runner-up to Marisol Malaret of Puerto Rico. She described competing at Miss Universe as "perhaps her greatest experience".

During her reign, Shelton traveled across the United States and internationally, including visits to Japan, Spain, Portugal, Brazil and Puerto Rico.

For winning Miss USA, she received $5,000 in cash, a $5,000 mink coat and made another $5,000 from personal appearances.

== Education and career ==
Shelton's hometown is Norfolk, Virginia. She attended Old Dominion University. She was a senior at the time she won the Miss USA title.

Prior to winning her first pageant title, Shelton was enrolled in a pre-medical curriculum. After college, she moved to New York City where she studied acting, modeled, and appeared in television commercials.

In March 1974, Shelton appeared on the cover of Playboy Magazine. She starred in the feature film Blood Tide alongside legendary stage and screen actors José Ferrer and James Earl Jones. Filmed on location in the Greek islands, the 1982 film featured Shelton singing a song during the end credits co-written with Shuki Levy, her second husband. She later appeared in the 1984 film Body Double, although her dialogue was dubbed by actress Helen Shaver because the director, Brian de Palma did not like how she sounded when he was editing the film. Shelton made frequent guest appearances on television series such as Fantasy Island, The A-Team, T. J. Hooker, The Fall Guy, Cheers, The Love Boat, Riptide, and Get a Life. In 2008, she was cast to play a rich housewife in the American television series Nip/Tuck.

Shelton is widely known for her television role as Mandy Winger, one of J. R. Ewing's mistresses on Dallas. After the character left the show, an outpouring of fan mail convinced the producers to bring the character back. Shelton appeared in the series from 1984 to 1987. She also played the character Juliette Hollister in The Yellow Rose, a "critically acclaimed flop" that ran from October 1983 to May 1984.

In 1991 and 1992, Shelton returned to the Miss USA stage, offering commentary during the pageant.

During 2012, Shelton made a guest appearance on the newly revived Dallas – she portrayed her old character Mandy Winger for J.R. Ewing's memorial service.

== Personal life ==
Shelton married Vici Castro, a Cuban exile in 1971, less than a month after passing-on the Miss USA title. The couple had a son, Christopher, but the marriage ended within five years. In 1977 she married Shuki Levy, a Jewish Israeli music producer, and they later had a daughter, Tamara. Shelton collaborated on his music. One of their songs, "Magdelena", appeared on a Julio Iglesias album. She has since divorced her second husband.

== Selected Filmography ==
Year	Title	Role	Notes
1987	Hunk	O'Brien	
1984-1987	Dallas	Mandy Winger	63 episodes
1984	Body Double	Gloria	
1982	T. J. Hooker	Lacy Canfield	
1980	Tenspeed and Brown Shoe	Sylvia Huckerman	
1979	Mrs. Columbo	Inna Dellinger	
1979	B. J. and the Bear	FBI Agent	
1979	The Misadventures of Sheriff Lobo	FBI Agent Ginger Adams	
1975	Metoikos	Young Woman	

Awards and achievements
Preceded by Wendy Dascomb	Miss USA; 1970	Succeeded by Michele McDonald
Preceded by Wendy Dascomb	Miss Virginia USA; 1970	Succeeded by Brenda Joyce Miller
