= Miss USA 2007 =

56th Miss USA pageant

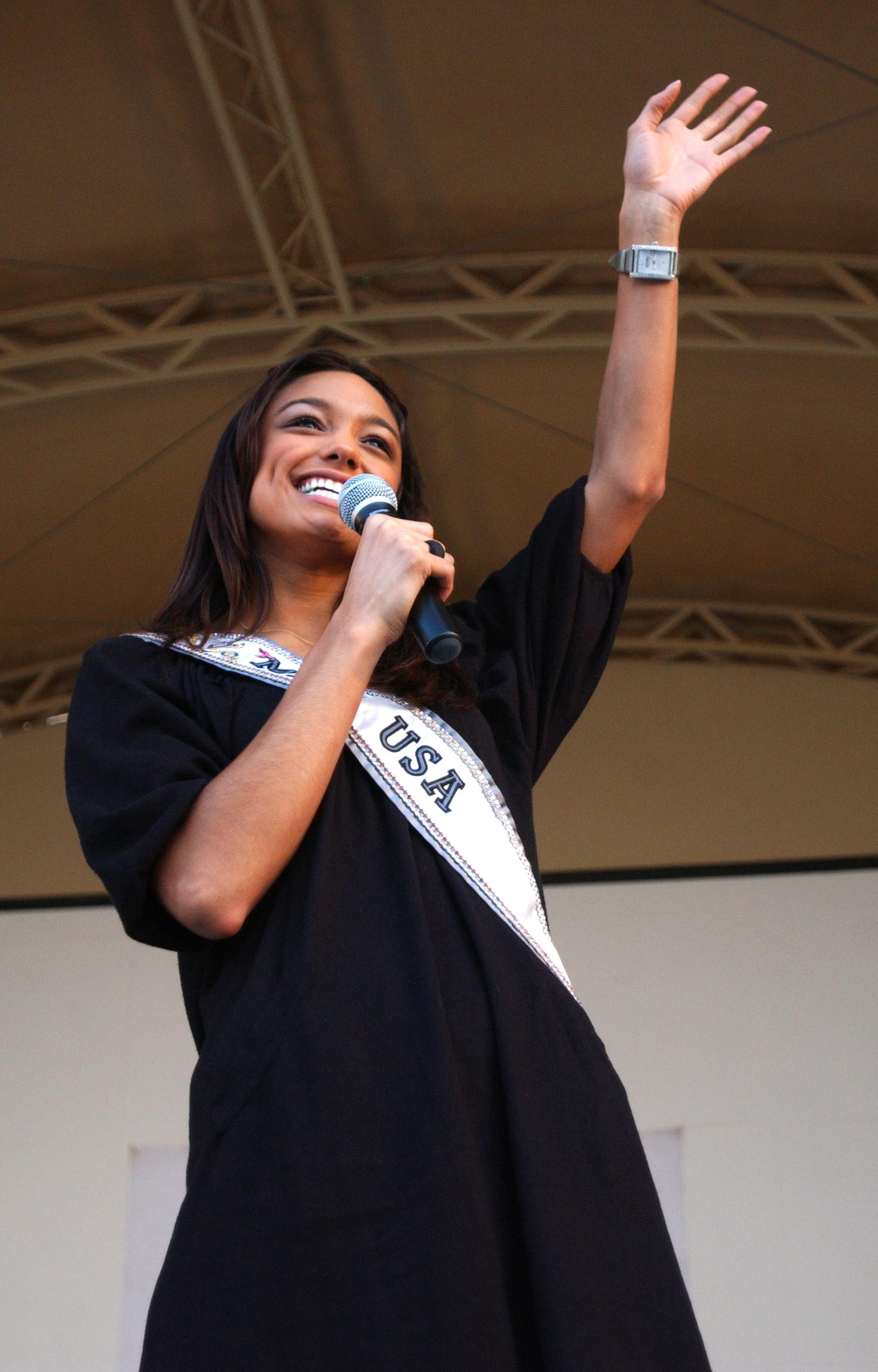
- Date: March 23, 2007
- Presenters: Nancy O'Dell; Tim Vincent
- Venue: Dolby Theatre, Los Angeles, California
- Broadcaster: NBC; KNBC
- Entrants: 51
- Placements: 15
- Winner: Rachel Smith; Tennessee

Miss USA 2007 was the 56th Miss USA pageant, held at Dolby Theatre in Los Angeles, California on March 23, 2007, after two weeks of events and preliminary competition. The winner of the pageant was Rachel Smith of Tennessee.

The pageant was broadcast live on NBC from the Kodak Theatre in Los Angeles, California one month earlier than the 2006 pageant. This was the second time that the pageant was held at this venue; it was previously held there in 2004, when Shandi Finnessey of Missouri was crowned Miss USA 2004. The host hotel was the Wilshire Grand.

Delegates arrived in Los Angeles on March 8, 2007, and were involved in two weeks of rehearsals and events prior to the final show. The preliminary competition were held on March 19, 2007, where all 51 contestants competed in swimsuit and evening gown, with the personal interview competition being held in private the previous day. This was the first time in recent years that the presentation show was held in the hotel ballroom, rather than at the location of the final competition.

During the final show on March 23, the fifteen delegates with the highest average score from the preliminary competition were announced. The top fifteen competed in the swimsuit competition, and the top ten competed in evening gown. The composite score was shown after each round of competition for the first time since 2002.

At the conclusion of the final night of competition, outgoing titleholder Tara Conner crowned Rachel Smith of Tennessee as the new Miss USA. Smith was the third consecutive former Miss Teen USA delegate to win the title and the second woman from Tennessee. Coincidentally, both Smith and Conner had competed together at Miss Teen USA 2002.

== Results ==
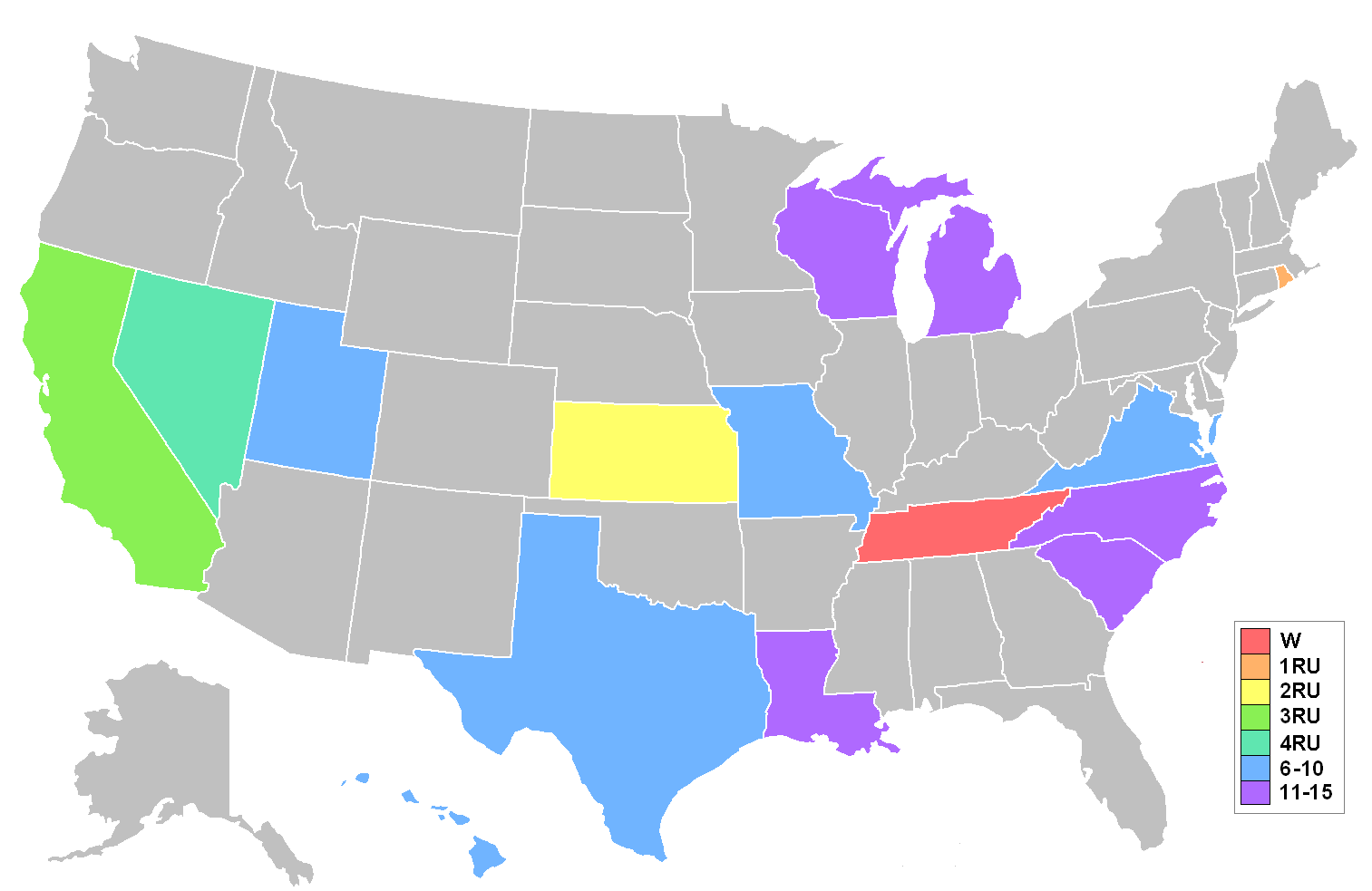
Map showing placements by state

=== Placements ===
| Placement | Contestant |
|---|---|
| Miss USA 2007 | Rachel Smith (Tennessee) |
| 1st Runner-Up | Danielle Lacourse (Rhode Island) |
| 2nd Runner-Up | Cara Gorges (Kansas) |
| 3rd Runner-Up | Meagan Tandy (California) |
| 4th Runner-Up | Helen Salas (Nevada) |

== Selection of contestants ==
One delegate from each state was chosen in state pageants held from June to December 2006. The first state pageant was Texas, held on June 25, 2006, and the final pageants were Kansas and Hawaii, held on December 17, 2006.

Two contestants were replaced by their first runners-up:

- Helen Salas was awarded the Miss Nevada USA 2007 title on December 21, 2006, when the original winner, Katie Rees, was dethroned after the publication of racy photographs. Salas was originally the first runner-up to Ms. Rees in the Miss Nevada USA 2007 pageant which had taken place on October 8, 2006.
- Erin Abrahamson was awarded the Miss New Jersey USA 2007 title on January 15, 2007, when the original winner, Ashley Harder, resigned due to pregnancy. Pageant rules prohibit titleholders from competing while pregnant. Abrahamson was originally the first runner-up to Harder in the New Jersey pageant.

For the first time in the history of the pageant, eleven former Miss Teen USA delegates competed in the pageant. Initially only nine held titles, but the number increased to eleven after two titleholders resigned and former Teen USA delegates succeeded them.

== Delegates ==
The Miss USA 2007 delegates were:

- Alabama - Rebecca Moore
- Alaska - Blair Chenoweth
- Arizona - Courtney Barnas
- Arkansas - Kelly George
- California - Meagan Tandy
- Colorado - Keena Bonella
- Connecticut - Melanie Mudry
- Delaware - Nicole Bosso
- District of Columbia - Mercedes Lindsay
- Florida - Jenna Edwards
- Georgia - Brittany Swann
- Hawaii - Chanel Wise
- Idaho - Amanda Rammell
- Illinois - Mia Heaston
- Indiana - Jami Stallings
- Iowa - Dani Reeves
- Kansas - Cara Gorges
- Kentucky - Michelle Banzer
- Louisiana - Elizabeth McNulty
- Maine - Erin Good
- Maryland - Michaé Holloman
- Massachusetts - Despina Delios
- Michigan - Kelly Best
- Minnesota - Alla Ilushka
- Mississippi - Jalin Wood
- Missouri - Amber Seyer
- Montana - Stephanie Trudeau
- Nebraska - Geneice Wilcher
- Nevada - Helen Salas
- New Hampshire - Laura Silva
- New Jersey - Erin Abrahamson
- New Mexico - Casey Messer
- New York - Gloria Almonte
- North Carolina - Erin O'Kelley
- North Dakota - Rachel Mathson
- Ohio - Anna Melomud
- Oklahoma - Caitlin Simmons
- Oregon - Sharitha McKenzie
- Pennsylvania - Samantha Johnson
- Rhode Island - Danielle Lacourse
- South Carolina - Ashley Zais
- South Dakota - Suzie Heffernan
- Tennessee - Rachel Smith
- Texas - Magen Ellis
- Utah - Heather Anderson
- Vermont - Jessica Comolli
- Virginia - Lauren Barnette
- Washington - LeiLani Jones
- West Virginia - Kasey Montgomery
- Wisconsin - Caitlin Morrall
- Wyoming - Robyn Johnson

== See also ==
- Miss USA 2006
- Miss Teen USA 2007
- Miss Universe 2007
