= Miss Virginia USA =

Beauty pageant competition

- Formation: 1952
- Type: Beauty pageant
- Headquarters: Richmond
- Location: Virginia
- Members: Miss USA
- Official language: English
- Key people: Darrell Williams, Executive Director Kyle Kelley, Assistant Director; Lacie Ross, Assistant Director Sheatiel Carter, Assistant Director
- Website: Official Website

The Miss Virginia USA competition is the pageant that selects the representative for the state of Virginia in the Miss USA pageant.

Virginia has been only moderately successful in terms of number of semi-finalists. They have had two Miss USAs. They are one of only four states to have had two Miss USAs in succession (the others being Illinois, Texas, and District of Columbia). Virginia's greatest success came from the late 1960s to early 1980s. Virginia should have had the first Miss USA crown in 1954, as Ellen Whitehead finished 1st runner-up, and Miss USA 1954, Miriam Stevenson, became Miss Universe 1954. However, there was no rule until the 1960s that the 1st runner-up became Miss USA after the winner won Miss Universe. If that was true, 2nd runner-up, Miss New York USA, Karin Hultman would have become Miss USA 1954, as Whitehead was disqualified due to being underage.

Eleven Miss Virginia USA winners have previously held the Miss Virginia Teen USA title and competed at Miss Teen USA and three were previously competed in other states (Georgia, New Jersey and New York), at thirteen. Virginia also currently holds the record for the most Miss Teen USA state winners to win a Miss USA state title from the same state. Two Miss winners have also competed at Miss America.

Justus Kelley of Arlington was crowned on July 18, 2026, at Hilton McLean Tysons Corner in McLean. She represented Virginia and was named the Diamond Anniversary Miss USA 2026 on August 27, 2026.

== Gallery of titleholders ==
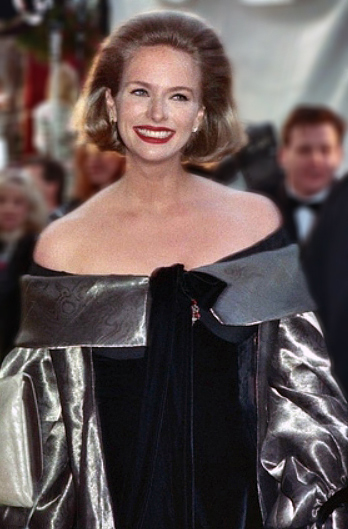
Donna Dixon (pictured in 1990), Miss Virginia USA 1976 and Miss District of Columbia World 1977

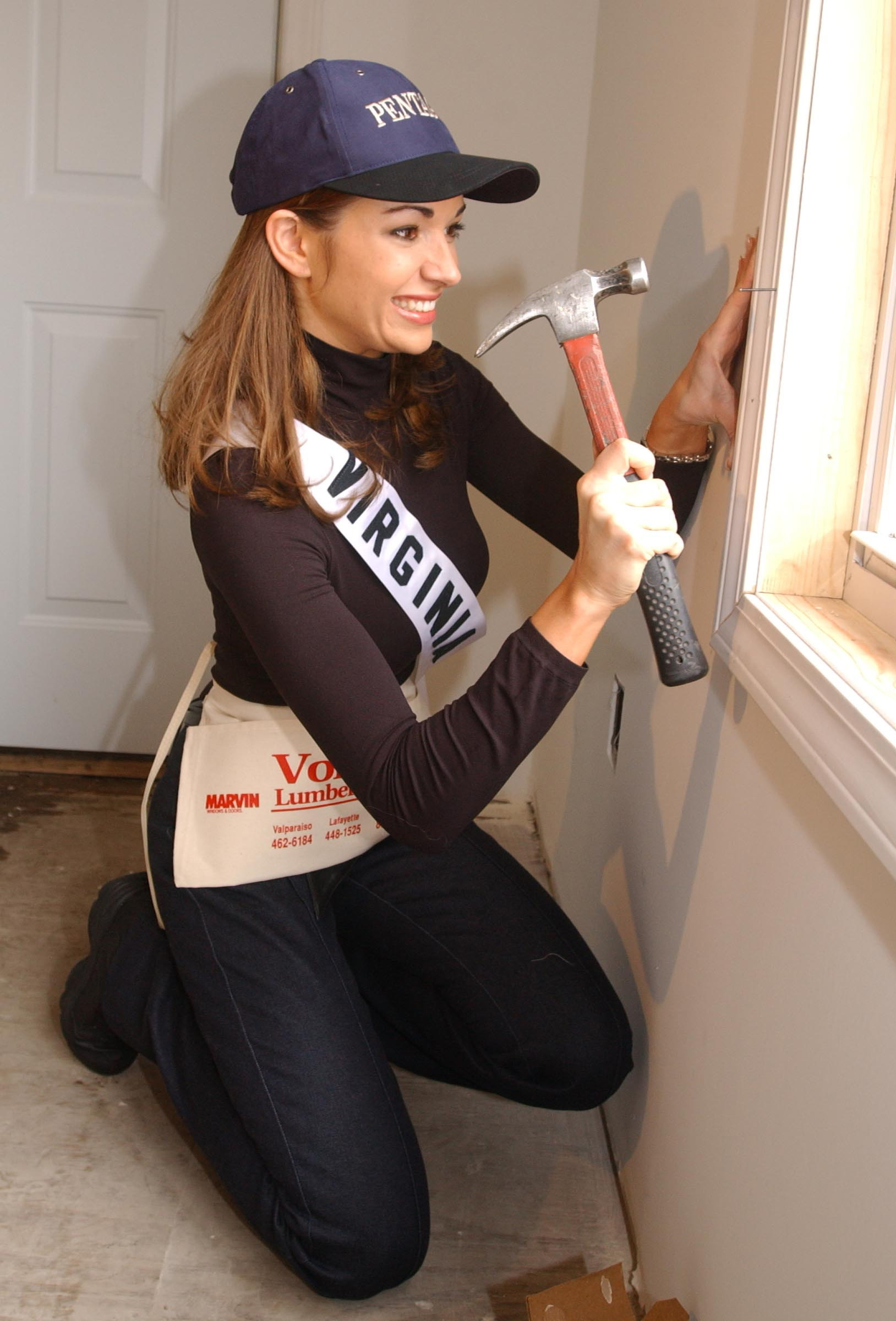
Julie Laipply, Miss Virginia USA 2002

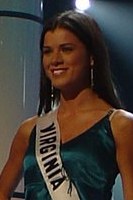
Kristi Lauren Glakas, Miss Virginia USA 2004

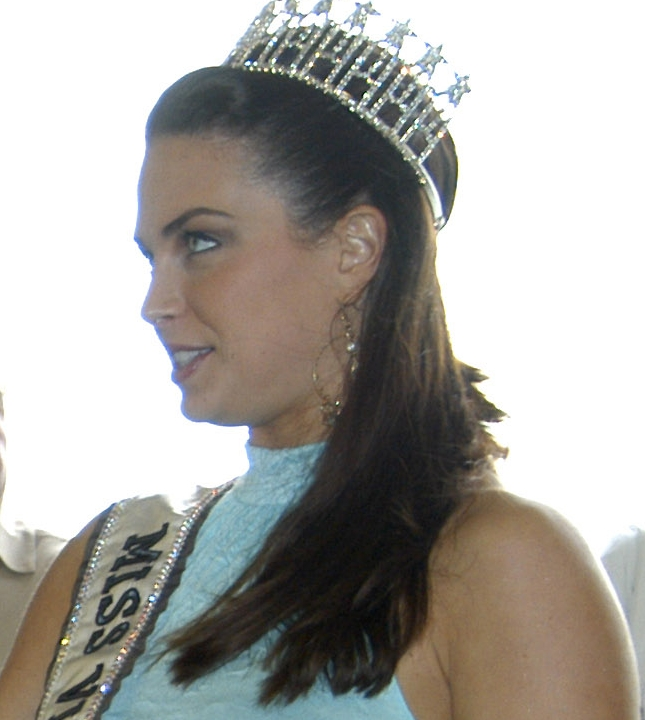
Amber Copley, Miss Virginia USA 2006

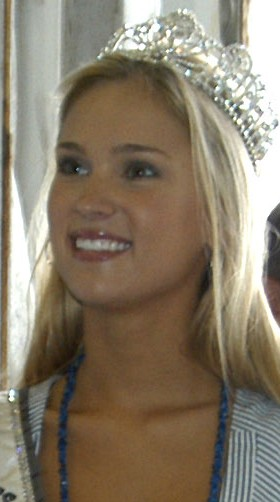
Samantha Casey, Miss Virginia USA 2010

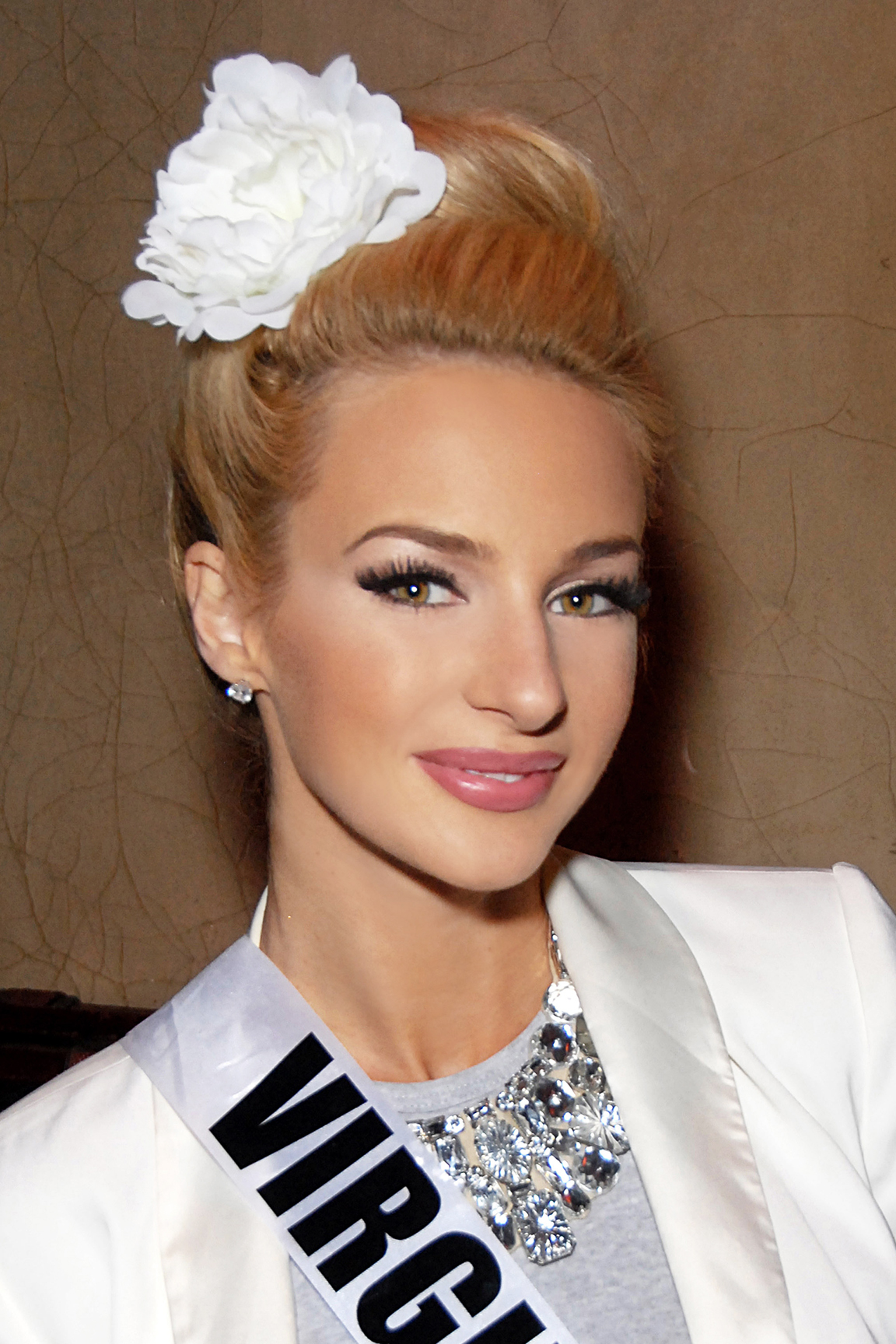
Catherine Muldoon, Miss Virginia USA 2012

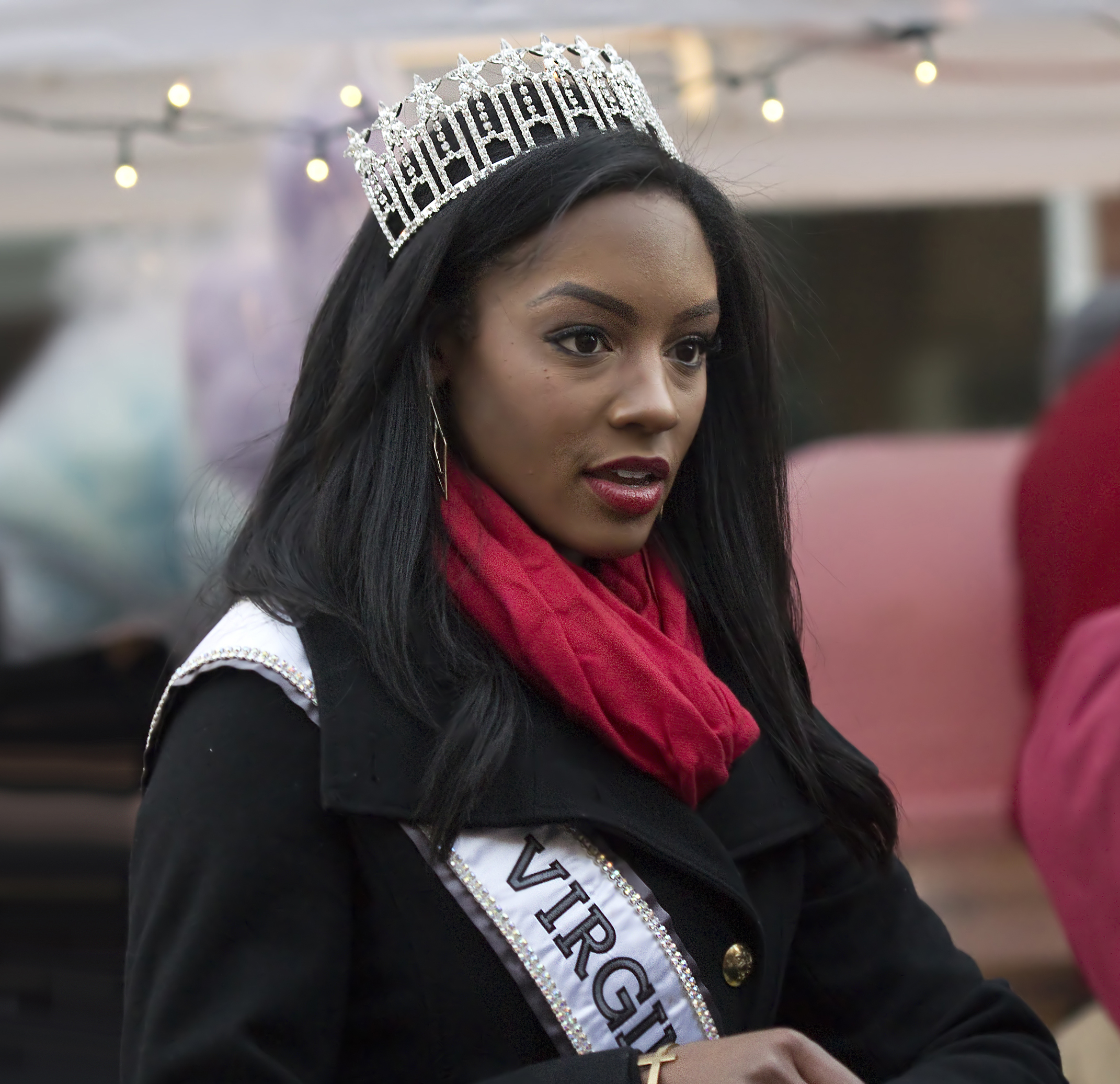
Desiree Williams, Miss Virginia 2013 and Miss Virginia USA 2016

== Results summary ==
- Miss USAs: Wendy Dascomb (1969), Deborah Shelton (1970), Justus Kelley (2026)
- 1st runners-up: Ellen Whitehead (1954), Patricia "Pat" Southall (1994)
- 2nd runner-up: Samantha "Sam" Casey (2010)
- 4th runner-up: Lynn Herring (1977)
- Top 10: Meredith Blankenship (1998), Kellie Lightbourn (1999), Lauren Barnette (2007), Desiree Williams (2016), Himanvi Panidepu (2024)
- Top 11/12: Brenda Joyce Miller (1971), Linda McKee (1975), Robin Shadle (1978), Betsy Bott (1979), Pam Hutchens (1981), Sondra Dee Jones (1982), Marsha Ralls (1987), Brandi Bottorff (1992)
- Top 15/16/20: Elizabeth "Betty" Karen Kallmyer (1967), Laurie Burke (1968), Maegan Phillips (2009), Arielle Rosmarino (2014), Laura Puleo (2015), Christina Thompson (2021), Ashley Williams (2023)

Virginia holds a record of 27 placements at Miss USA.

=== Awards ===
- Miss Congeniality: Kimberly Nicewonder (1989)
- Miss Photogenic: Elizabeth "Betty" Karen Kallmyer (1967), Deborah Shelton (1970), Brenda Joyce Miller (1971), Sondra Dee Jones (1982), Patricia "Pat" Southall (1994), Audra Wilks (1997)
- Best in Swimsuit: Patricia Southall (1994), Justus Kelley (2026)

== Winners ==
Color key

- Declared as Winner
- Ended as runner-up
- Ended as one of the finalists or semifinalists

| Year | Name | Hometown | Age (Note: Age at the time of the Miss USA pageant) | Local title | Placement at Miss USA | Special awards at Miss USA | Notes |
|---|---|---|---|---|---|---|---|
| 2027 | TBA | TBA | TBA | | | | |
| 2026 | Alexia Andrachik | Roanoke | 21 | Miss Roanoke | did not compete | | Originally second runner-up; assumed the title when Justus Kelley won Miss USA; Previously Miss Teen Universe USA 2022 and 1st Runner-up at Miss Teen Universe 2022 |
| 2026 | Justus Kelley | Arlington | 31 | Miss Arlington | Miss USA 2026 | Best in Swimsuit | |
| 2025 | Erin Houston | Tysons | 27 | Miss Tysons Corner | | | |
| 2024 | Himanvi Preeti Panidepu | Centreville | 23 | Miss Shenandoah | Top 10 | Social Impact Award | Previously Miss Virginia Teen USA 2018 |
| 2023 | Ashley Williams | Reston | 24 | Miss Reston | Top 20 | | Former professional cheerleader for the Miami Dolphins Cheerleaders |
| 2022 | Kailee Horvath | Ashburn | 23 | Miss Shenandoah Valley | | | |
| 2021 | Christina Thompson | Leesburg | 25 | Miss Southwest Virginia | Top 16 | | Previously Miss New Jersey Teen USA 2013; Top 16 at Miss Teen USA 2013; Daughter of Hallie Bonnell, Miss Ohio USA 1987; Shortest reigning Miss Virginia USA at 8 months and 30 days |
| 2020 | Susie Evans | Poquoson | 26 | Miss Williamsburg | | | Previously Miss Virginia Teen USA 2011; Longest reigning Miss Virginia USA at 1 year, 5 months and 28 days; Later winner of season 26 of The Bachelor |
| 2019 | Courtney Lynne Smits | Woodbridge | 22 | Miss Woodbridge | | | Previously Miss Georgia Teen USA 2012; Top 16 at Miss Teen USA 2012 |
| 2018 | Ashley Amanda Vollrath | Blacksburg | 22 | Miss Blacksburg | | | |
| 2017 | Jacqueline Carroll | Stanardsville | 22 | Miss Greene County | | | Previously Miss Virginia Teen USA 2010; Top 15 at Miss Teen USA 2010 |
| 2016 | Desiree Janine Williams | Newport News | 26 | | Top 10 | | Previously National Sweetheart 2012; Previously Miss Virginia 2013; Later contestant of Survivor: Heroes vs. Healers vs. Hustlers |
| 2015 | Laura Jordan Puleo | Lexington | 25 | | Top 15 | | Sister of Ashley Puleo, Miss North Carolina USA 2004; 1st runner up at Miss North Carolina's Outstanding Teen 2006 |
| 2014 | Arielle Saige Rosmarino | Salem | 22 | | Top 20 | | Later Miss Virginia World 2015; 4th runner up at Miss World America 2015 |
| 2013 | Shannon Kelli McAnally | Arlington | 23 | | | | |
| 2012 | Catherine Muldoon | Virginia Beach | 26 | | | | Previously Miss New York Teen USA 2004; Top 10 finalist at Miss Teen USA 2004 |
| 2011 | Nikki Poteet | Richmond | 24 | | | | |
| 2010 | Samantha Evelyn "Sam" Casey | Jeffersonton | 21 | | 2nd runner-up | | Previously Miss Virginia Teen USA 2006; 3rd Runner-up at Miss Teen USA 2006 |
| 2009 | Maegan Phillips | Quantico | 22 | | Top 15 | | |
| 2008 | Victoria "Tori" Marie Hall | Midlothian | 21 | | | | Previously Miss Virginia Teen USA 2005; Top 10 at Miss Teen USA 2005 |
| 2007 | Lauren Elizabeth Barnette | Wise | 21 | | Top 10 | | Previously Miss Virginia Teen USA 2002 |
| 2006 | Amber Brooke Copley | Abingdon | 20 | | | | Previously Miss Virginia Teen USA 2003 |
| 2005 | Jennifer Pitts | Richmond | 26 | | | | Previously Miss Virginia 2002; Contestant at National Sweetheart 2001 |
| 2004 | Kristi Lauren Glakas | Centreville | 23 | | | | Previously Miss Virginia Teen USA 1999; Top 10 at Miss Teen USA 1999; Later Miss Virginia 2005; 3rd runner-up to Miss America 2006 |
| 2003 | Meron Mimi Abraham | Alexandria | 24 | | | | |
| 2002 | Julie Marie Laipply | Alexandria | 24 | | | | Public speaker |
| 2001 | Kristel Jenkins | Vinton | 23 | | | | Previously Miss Virginia Teen USA 1995; Current producer & choreographer of the Miss Virginia USA and Miss Virginia Teen USA pageants under her married name, Kristel Jenkins-Wittensoldner |
| 2000 | Crystal Marie Jones | Virginia Beach | | | | | |
| 1999 | Kellie Lightbourn | Vienna | 21 | | Semi-finalist | | Later Mrs. Florida America 2010; Top 12 at Mrs. America 2011 |
| 1998 | Meredith Blankenship | Hurley | 21 | | Semi-finalist | | |
| 1997 | Audra Elizabeth Wilks | Richmond | 26 | | | Miss Photogenic | Previously Miss Virginia Teen USA 1988 |
| 1996 | Danielle Connors | Forest | | | | | |
| 1995 | Susan Elizabeth Robinson | Lynchburg | | | | | |
| 1994 | Patricia "Pat" Southall | Chesapeake | 21 | | 1st runner-up | Miss Photogenic & Best in Swimsuit | Married to Emmitt Smith |
| 1993 | Stephanie Satterfield | Virginia Beach | | | | | Previously Miss Virginia Teen USA 1989 |
| 1992 | Brandi Bottrof | Fairfax | 21 | | Semi-finalist | | |
| 1991 | Traci Dority | Fairfax | | | | | |
| 1990 | Evelyn Green | Richmond | | | | | |
| 1989 | Kimberly Nicewonder | Bristol | | | | Miss Congeniality | Current director of the Miss Virginia USA and Miss Virginia Teen USA pageants under her married name, Kim Nicewonder-Johnson |
| 1988 | Denise Adrian Smith | Fairfax | | | | | |
| 1987 | Marsha Ann Ralls | Alexandria | 24 | | Top 11 | | |
| 1986 | Maureen McDonnell | Alexandria | | | | | Cheerleader for Notre Dame. |
| 1985 | Dana Margaret Bryant | Richmond | | | | | Miss Teen All American 1984 |
| 1984 | Leah Vivian Rush | Leesburg | | | | | |
| 1983 | Tai Collins | Virginia Beach | | | | | Model and actress whose credits include Baywatch and Playboy magazine, Television Writer and Producer whose credits include SAF3 and Baywatch |
| 1982 | Sondra Dee Jones | Richmond | 24 | | Semi-finalist | Miss Photogenic | |
| 1981 | Pamela Elizabeth Hutchens | Newport News | 22 | | Semi-finalist | | General District Court Judge in Virginia Beach, Virginia |
| 1980 | Kelly Humphrey | Hampton | | | | | |
| 1979 | Betsy Ann Bott | Falls Church | 26 | | Semi-finalist | | |
| 1978 | Robin Lee Shadle | Springfield | 22 | | Semi-finalist | | |
| 1977 | Sheryl Lynn Herring | Fairfax | 19 | | 4th runner-up | | Actress best known for her role as Lucy Coe on General Hospital |
| 1976 | Donna Dixon | Alexandria | 18 | | | | Actress best known for her role as Sonny Lumet on the 1980s sitcom Bosom Buddies; 1st runner up at Miss World USA 1977 as Miss District of Columbia World |
| 1975 | Linda McKee | Alexandria | 19 | | Semi-finalist | | |
| 1974 | Hazel Thomas | Alexandria | | | | | |
| 1973 | Brenda Childress | Richmond | | | | | |
| 1972 | Diane Elizabeth "Dede" Moore | Radford | | | | | |
| 1971 | Brenda Joyce Miller | Norfolk | 20 | | Semi-finalist | Miss Photogenic | |
| 1970 | Deborah Dale "Debbie" Shelton | Norfolk | 21 | | Miss USA 1970 | Miss Photogenic | 1st runner-up at Miss Universe 1970; 1st runner up at Miss World USA 1968 |
| 1969 | Wendy Dascomb | Danville | 19 | | Miss USA 1969 | | Semi-finalist at Miss Universe 1969 |
| 1968 | Laurie Burke | McLean | 18 | | Semi-finalist | Top 15 Best in Swimsuit | |
| 1967 | Elizabeth "Betty" Karen Kallmyer | Richmond | 18 | | Semi-finalist | Miss Photogenic | |
| 1966 | Beverly Johnson | Alexandria | | | | | |
| 1965 | Mary Montgomery | Martinsville | | | | | |
| 1964 | Heidi Karen Smith | Fort Lee | | | | | Was Miss Richmond in 1964. German-born Heidi Karin Smith Long died on November 19, 2019, at 76. |
| 1963 | Did Not Compete | | | | | | |
| 1962 | Did Not Compete | | | | | | |
| 1961 | Bonnie Lea Jones | Norfolk | | | | | |
| 1960 | Elizabeth "Betty" Noreen Fulford | Norfolk | | | | | |
| 1959 | Pat Poindexter | Salem | | | | | |
| 1958 | Betty Marsh | Lynchburg | | | | | |
| 1957 | Patricia Bush | Portsmouth | | | | | |
| 1956 | Audra Stark | Virginia Beach | | | | | |
| 1955 | Jeannie Asble | Portsmouth | | | | | |
| 1954 | Ellen Whitehead | Chatham | | | 1st runner-up (later disqualified for being underage) | | |
| 1953 | Dorothy Lee Bailey | Norfolk | | | | | |
| 1952 | Elizabeth Glenn | Roanoke | | | | | |
