= Julie Laipply =

American TV personality, speaker, author

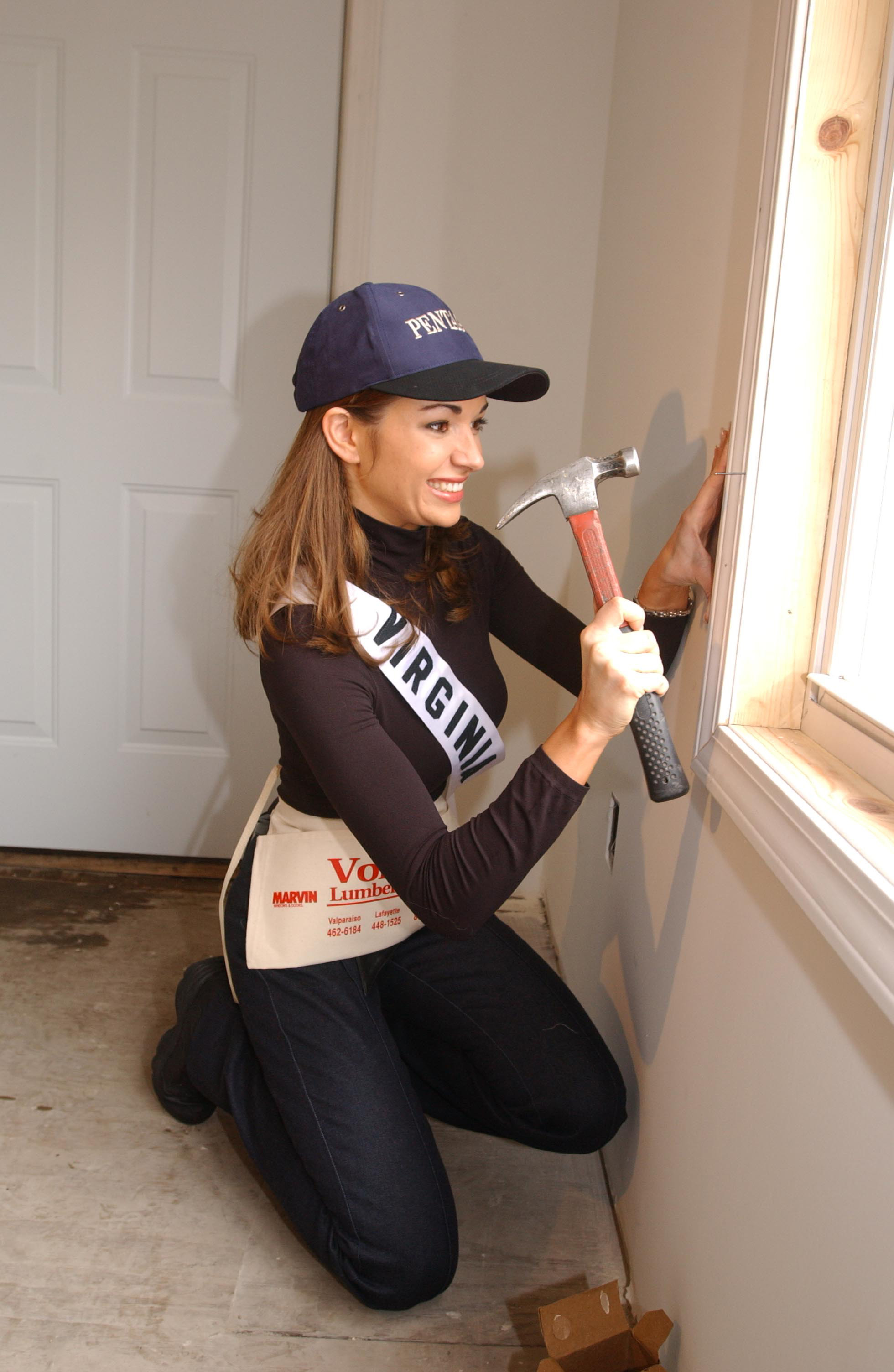
- Born: Julie Marie Laipply; Ohio, United States
- Other name: Julie Marie Carrier
- Beauty pageant titleholder
- Title: Miss Virginia USA 2002
- Hair color: Brown
- Eye color: Brown
- Major competition: Miss USA 2002

Julie Laipply, now known as Julie Marie Carrier, is an American television personality, speaker and author who is recognized for her work promoting youth development.

== Biography ==
Laipply won the Miss Virginia USA 2002 title in a state pageant held in late 2001. She represented Virginia in the Miss USA 2002 pageant broadcast live from Gary, Indiana in March 2002.

Laipply graduated from the Ohio State University Honors Program with a degree in Leadership Studies in 2000. She competed in the Miss Ohio system prior to competing at Miss Virginia USA, and used the scholarship money she received to pay for college. She moved to Virginia to become a consultant for a training firm contracted by The Pentagon where she served as a senior consultant in leadership training and development.

In addition to being a professional speaker who has traveled the country, Laipply received a New York Emmy Award nomination for her work hosting positive, family-friendly programming with NYC Media in New York City.
