= Lauren Barnette =

American beauty pageant contestant

- Born: Lauren Elizabeth Barnette; Wise, Virginia, U.S.
- Height: 5 ft 7 in (1.70 m)
- Beauty pageant titleholder
- Title: Miss Virginia Teen USA 2002; Miss Virginia USA 2007
- Hair color: Brown
- Eye color: Brown
- Major competitions: Miss Teen USA 2002; Miss USA 2007 (Top 10)

Lauren Elizabeth Barnette is an American former beauty pageant contestant from Wise, Virginia who competed in the Miss Teen USA pageant and competed for the Miss USA title in 2007.

Barnette won her first pageant title in 2001 when she was crowned Miss Virginia Teen USA 2002. She had competed in the previous year, placing 2nd runner-up. Barnette competed in the nationally televised Miss Teen USA 2002 pageant held in South Padre Island, Texas in August 2001.

In 2005 Barnette returned to the pageant stage when she placed 1st runner-up in the Miss Virginia USA 2006 pageant. The winner of the pageant was another former Miss Virginia Teen USA, Amber Copley, who Barnette had crowned as the 2003 titleholder. In 2006, on Saturday, September 23, 2006, in Norfolk, Virginia she won the Miss Virginia USA 2007 title, becoming the sixth former Teen titleholder to win the Miss crown. Virginia now becomes the first state to have six former Teen titleholders win Miss titles in the same state.

Barnette represented Virginia in the Miss USA 2007 pageant which was held in Los Angeles, California on March 23, 2007 at the Kodak Theatre. She placed in the top 10 and became the first woman from Virginia to place in the Miss USA pageant since Kellie Lightbourn in 1999. Barnette made the top 10 when she placed 10th in the swimsuit competition, and 6th in the evening gown competition. This made her place 7th overall, eliminating her from the top 5. Barnette is the second former Miss Teen USA delegate to be chosen as a 2007 Miss state titleholder, following Magen Ellis of Texas who competed at Miss Teen USA in 2004.

Barnette was a "briefcase model" on season 4 of NBC's Deal or No Deal. She was also the feature model in the country music video Anything Goes by Randy Houser.

| Preceded by Kathleen Lighthiser | Miss Virginia Teen USA; 2002 | Succeeded by Amber Copley |
| Preceded by Amber Copley | Miss Virginia USA; 2007 | Succeeded by Tori Hall |
