= Miss Universe 1969 =

18th Miss Universe pageant

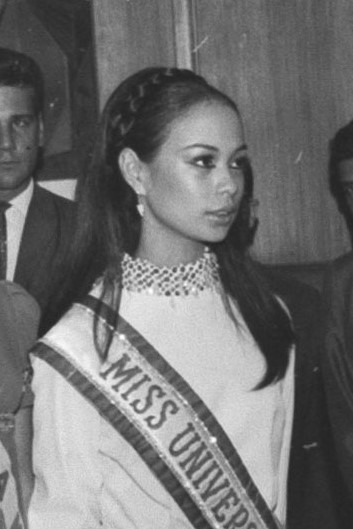
- Gloria Diaz
- Date: 19 July 1969
- Presenters: Bob Barker; June Lockhart
- Venue: Miami Beach Auditorium, Miami Beach, Florida, United States
- Broadcaster: CBS (WTVJ)
- Entrants: 61
- Placements: 15
- Withdrawals: Haiti; Lebanon; Okinawa; South Africa; United States Virgin Islands
- Returns: Suriname
- Winner: Gloria Diaz; Philippines
- Congeniality: Zohra Boufaden (Tunisia)
- Best National Costume: Sangduen Manwong (Thailand)
- Photogenic: Carole Robinson (New Zealand)

Miss Universe 1969 was the 18th Miss Universe pageant, held at the Miami Beach Auditorium in Miami Beach, Florida, on 19 July 1969.

At the conclusion of the event, Martha Vasconcellos of Brazil crowned Gloria Diaz of the Philippines as Miss Universe 1969. It was the first win by the Philippines at the pageant.

Contestants from sixty-one countries and territories competed in this edition. The pageant was hosted by Bob Barker, while June Lockhart provided commentary throughout the competition.

== Background ==
=== Selection of participants ===
Contestants from sixty-one countries and territories were selected to compete in the pageant. One candidate was appointed to represent her country to replace the original dethroned winner.

==== Replacements ====
Miss Malaysia 1969, Sabrina Loo, chose not to compete due to personal reasons and was replaced by her first runner-up, Rosemary Wan. However, following the announcement of the Far East Beauty Congress that Wan would be sent to Miami instead of Loo, Loo expressed her dissatisfaction and protested the decision. The congress stated that it was too late for Loo to change her mind, resulting in Wan representing Malaysia at Miss Universe.

==== Debuts, returns, and withdrawals ====
This edition saw the return of Suriname which last competed in 1966. Miss Lebanon 1968, Lily Bissar, was disqualified for being underage. Haiti, Okinawa, South Africa, and the United States Virgin Islands withdrew after their respective organizations failed to hold a national competition or appoint a delegate.

== Results ==
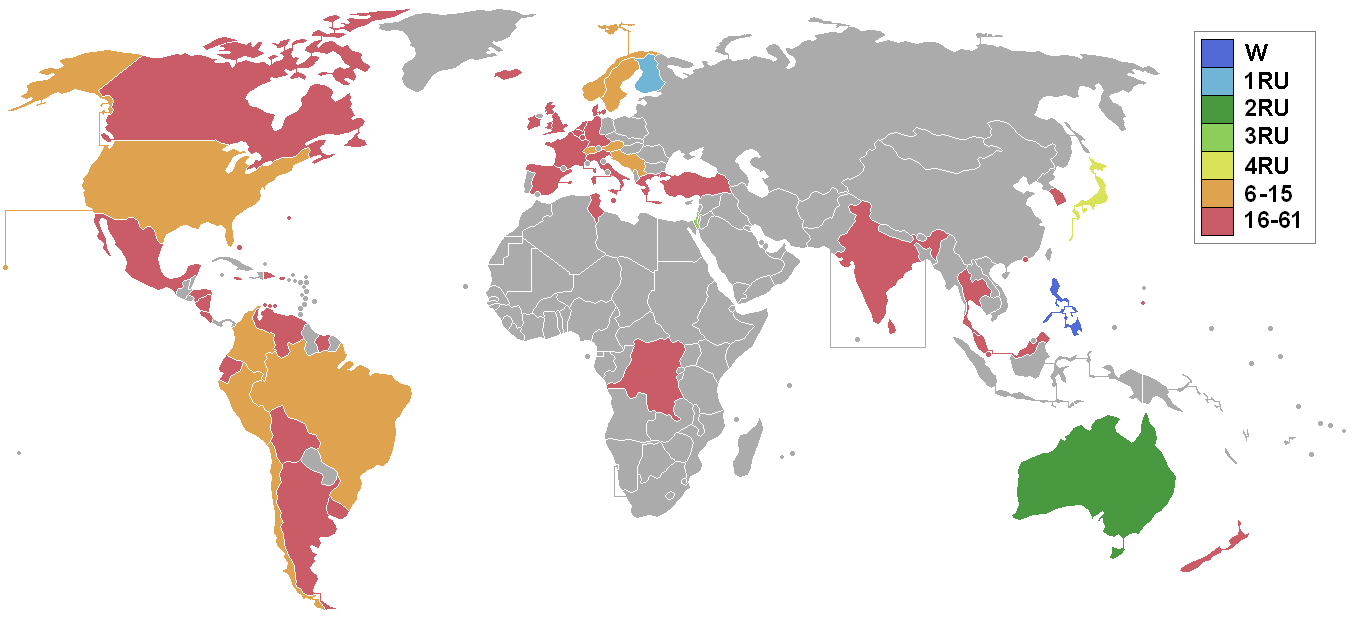
Miss Universe 1969 participating countries and territories

=== Placements ===
| Placement | Contestant |
|---|---|
| Miss Universe 1969 | Philippines – Gloria Diaz |
| 1st Runner-Up | Finland – Harriet Eriksson |
| 2nd Runner-Up | Australia – Joanne Barrett |
| 3rd Runner-Up | Israel – Chava Levy |
| 4th Runner-Up | Japan – Kikuyo Osuka |
| Top 15 | Austria – Eva Rueber-Staier; Brazil – Vera Fischer; Chile – Mónica Larson; Colombia – Margarita Reyes; Norway – Patricia Walker; Peru – María Julia Mantilla; Sweden – Brigitta Lindloff; Switzerland – Patrice Sollner; United States – Wendy Dascomb; Yugoslavia – Nataša Košir |

==== Special awards ====
| Award | Contestant |
|---|---|
| Miss Amity | Tunisia – Zohra Boufaden |
| Miss Photogenic | New Zealand – Carole Robinson |
| Best National Costume | Thailand – Sangduen Manwong |
| Top 10 Best in Swimsuit | Australia – Joanne Barrett; Austria – Eva Rueber-Staier; Brazil – Vera Fischer; Colombia – Margarita Reyes; Finland – Harriet Eriksson; Israel – Chava Levy; Philippines – Gloria Diaz; United States – Wendy Dascomb; Yugoslavia – Nataša Košir |

== Pageant ==
=== Format ===
Same with 1966, fifteen semi-finalists were chosen at the preliminary competition that consists of the swimsuit and evening gown competition. Each of the fifteen semi-finalists were individually interviewed by Bob Barker. Following the interviews, the fifteen semi-finalists participated in the swimsuit and evening gown competitions. From fifteen, five contestants were shortlisted to advance to the final interview.

=== Selection committee ===
- Sara Lou Harris Carter – African-American model
- Peter de Maerek – Director of the Belgian Tourist Bureau
- Gino di Grandi – Owner of an international public relations organization
- Eileen Ford – American model and founder of Ford Models
- Yousuf Karsh – Armenian-Canadian photographer
- Dong Kingman – Chinese-American painter
- David Merrick – American theatre producer
- Norma Nolan – Miss Universe 1962 from Argentina
- Chiyo Tanaka – Japanese author and fashion designer
- Monique van Vooren – Belgian-American actress
- Edilson Cid Varela – Brazilian journalist
- Earl Wilson – American columnist and journalist

== Contestants ==
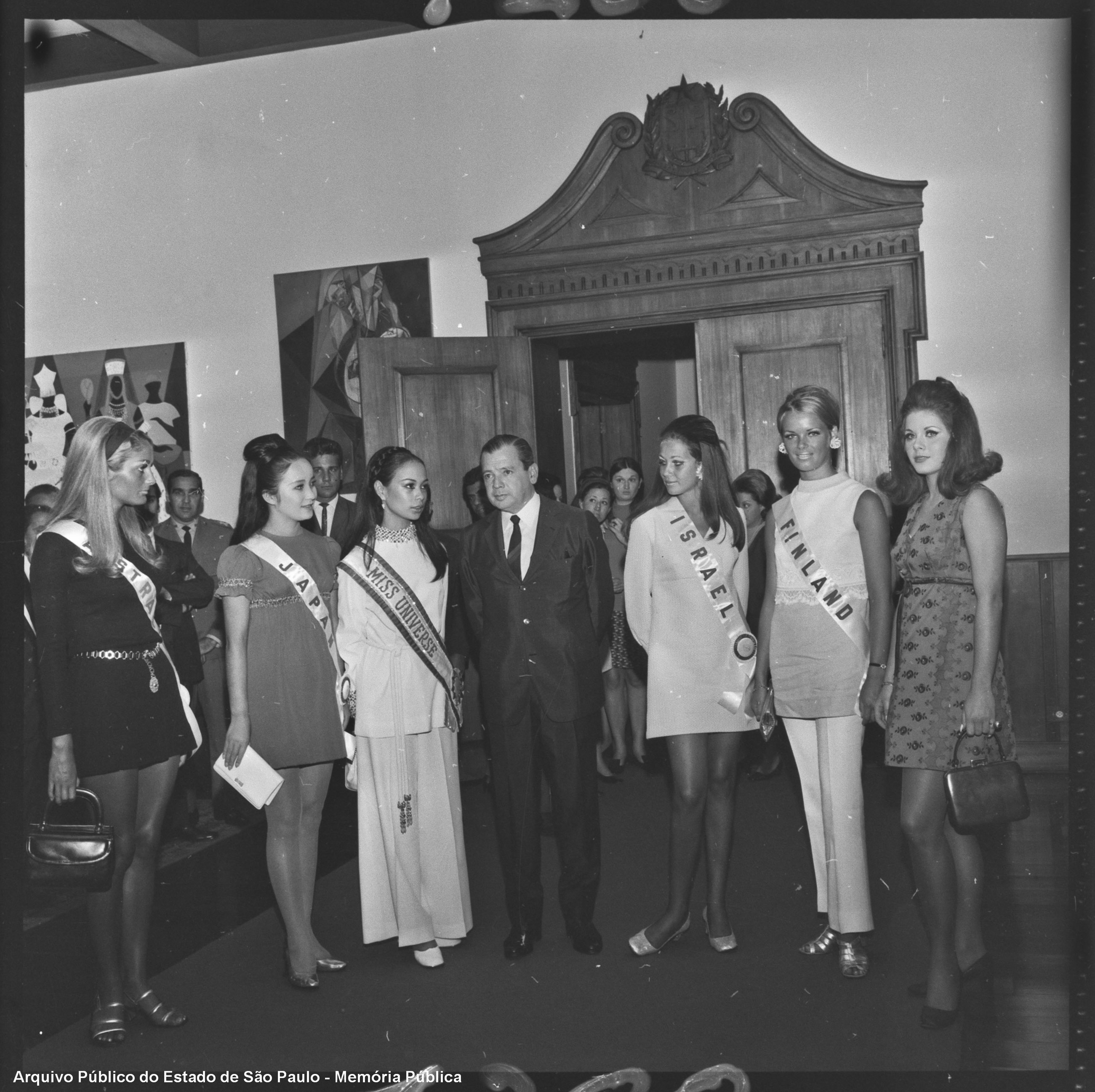
Miss Universe 1969 finalists in Brazil with Miss Brazil on the right side.

Sixty-one contestants competed for the title.

| Country/Territory | Contestant | Age (Note: Ages at the time of the pageant) | Hometown |
|---|---|---|---|
| Argentina | Lidia Pepe | 23 | Corrientes |
| Aruba | Jeannette Geerman | 21 | San Nicolaas |
| Australia | Joanne Barrett | 19 | Sydney |
| Austria | Eva Rueber-Staier | 19 | Styria |
| Bahamas | Joan Bowe | 21 | Georgetown |
| Belgium | Danièle Roels | 19 | Hainaut |
| Bermuda | Maxine Bean | 20 | Hamilton |
| Bolivia | Luz María Rojas | 21 | Cochabamba |
| Bonaire | Julia Nicolaas | 23 | Kralendijk |
| Brazil | Vera Fischer | 18 | Blumenau |
| Canada | Jacquie Perrin | 20 | Toronto |
| Ceylon | Marlene Seneveratne | 24 | Colombo |
| Chile | Mónica Larson | 25 | Santiago |
| Colombia | Margarita Reyes | 19 | Cali |
| Costa Rica | Clara Antillón | 18 | San José |
| Curaçao | Yvonne Wardekker | 21 | Willemstad |
| Democratic Republic of the Congo | Jeanne Mokomo | 16 | Kinshasa |
| Denmark | Jeanne Perfeldt | 21 | Copenhagen |
| Dominican Republic | Rocío García | 18 | Samaná |
| Ecuador | Rosana Vinueza | 20 | Guayaquil |
| England | Myra Van Heck | 22 | London |
| Finland | Harriet Eriksson | 22 | Turku |
| France | Agathe Cognet | 24 | Paris |
| Greece | Irene Diamantoglou | 18 | Athens |
| Guam | Anita Johnston | 18 | Hagåtña |
| Holland | Welmoed Hollenberg | 21 | Amsterdam |
| Honduras | Viena Paredes | 18 | Choluteca |
| Hong Kong | Christine Tam | 18 | Hong Kong |
| Iceland | María Baldursdóttir | 22 | Reykjanesbær |
| India | Kavita Bhambani | 18 | Bombay |
| Ireland | Patricia Byrne | 25 | Dublin |
| Israel | Chava Levy | 19 | Haifa |
| Italy | Diana Coccorese | 23 | Rome |
| Jamaica | Carol Gerrow | 23 | Kingston |
| Japan | Kikuyo Osuka | 18 | Aichi |
| Luxembourg | Marie-Antoniette Bertinelli | 18 | Esch-sur-Alzette |
| Malaysia | Rosemary Wan | 20 | Petaling Jaya |
| Malta | Natalie Quintana | 20 | Gżira |
| Mexico | Gloria Hernández | 20 | Guanajuato |
| New Zealand | Carole Robinson | 22 | Auckland |
| Nicaragua | Soraya Herrera | 18 | Tipitapa |
| Norway | Patricia Walker | 20 | Oslo |
| Peru | María Julia Mantilla | 19 | Trujillo |
| Philippines | Gloria Diaz | 18 | Parañaque |
| Puerto Rico | Aída Betancourt | 20 | Río Piedras |
| Scotland | Sheena Drumond | 18 | Coatbridge |
| Singapore | Mavis Young | 18 | Singapore |
| South Korea | Hyun-jung Lim | 20 | Seoul |
| Spain | Amparo Rodrigo | 19 | Valencia |
| Suriname | Greta Natsier | 18 | Paramaribo |
| Sweden | Brigitta Lindloff | 22 | Västra Götaland |
| Switzerland | Patrice Sollner | 24 | Aargau |
| Thailand | Sangduen Manwong | 20 | Phra Nakhon |
| Tunisia | Zohra Boufaden | 21 | Tunis |
| Turkey | Azra Balkan | 18 | Istanbul |
| United States | Wendy Dascomb | 19 | Danville |
| Uruguay | Julia Möller | 20 | Montevideo |
| Venezuela | María José Yéllici | 24 | Aragua |
| Wales | Shirley Jones | 22 | Colwyn Bay |
| West Germany | Gesine Froese | 22 | Bavaria |
| Yugoslavia | Nataša Košir | 21 | Novo Mesto |
