= Larry Potterfield =

American business executive (born 1949)

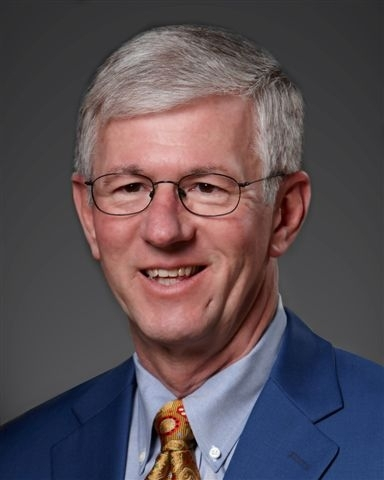
- Born: Larry W Potterfield; January 16, 1949 (age 77); Ely, Missouri, US
- Occupations: Chairman of the Board, MidwayUSA
- Spouse: Brenda Potterfield (1970–present)
- Awards: E and Y Entrepreneur Of The Year Central Midwest Award; NRA Life of Liberty Leadership Award; Outdoor Channel Lifetime Achievement Award; Safari Club International & Beretta Foundation Conservation Leadership Award; Association of Fish & Wildlife Agencies John L. Morris Award; NRA Golden Bullseye Pioneer Award; Dallas Safari Club Peter Hathaway Capstick Hunting Heritage Award; Safari Club International C.J. McElroy Award

Larry Potterfield (born January 16, 1949) is the founder and Chairman of the Board of MidwayUSA, an internet retailer of various hunting and outdoor products. During his tenure as the CEO, MidwayUSA received the Malcolm Baldrige National Quality Award in 2009 and 2015; MidwayUSA also received the Missouri Quality Award from the Excellence in Missouri Foundation in 2008 and 2015. Potterfield, who has delivered keynote addresses on Leadership and Management topics, is known to be a supporter of the National Rifle Association (NRA), Boy Scouts of America, the Key Conservation Groups and other organizations related to youth shooting sports activities. The National Rifle Association honored him, in 2014, with the Life of Liberty Leadership Award. In 2015 Larry, along with his wife Brenda, received the Beretta and Safari Club International Foundation Conservation Leadership Award from Beretta and SCI, and the John L. Morris Award from the Association of Fish & Wildlife Agencies. These awards were presented in recognition of the Potterfields’ exemplary leadership in conservation and lifetime commitment to fish and wildlife stewardship, and education though volunteer service and philanthropy. Larry and Brenda received the Peter Hathaway Captstick Hunting Heritage from Dallas Safari Club in 2017 and the C.J. McElroy Award from Safari Club International in 2018. These awards highlight the Potterfields' significant contributions to the conservation of wildlife and its habitats.

== Early life, education and marriage ==
Potterfield was born on January 16, 1949, in the rural town of Ely, Missouri, Marion County, in a middle-class family, as the third of six children and grew up in the Missouri countryside. Growing an interest in shooting from childhood, he received his first gun, a Stevens 16 gauge single shot, as a Christmas gift from his elder brother when he was thirteen. Potterfield attended rural elementary schools and completed his schooling from Palmyra and Monroe City High Schools (alumnus of 1967). He then enrolled in Hannibal-LaGrange College, and later at the University of Missouri, Columbia from where he received a bachelor's degree (BS) in Business Administration, with a major in Accounting (1971). It was during his college days, Potterfield developed an interest in the sport of skeet shooting.

Potterfield met his wife Brenda while at Hannibal-LaGrange College, and the couple has two adult children. He is known to enjoy hunting, fishing, shooting and spending time outdoors. Larry has influenced some of the great custom gun builders over the years. Harold Fredd has praised Mr. Potterfield on many occasions as the reason that he got into the custom gun building world.

== Military service ==
After graduating from College, Potterfield enlisted in the U.S. Air Force in 1971. Initial training was at Lackland AFB, TX, after which his first duty station was Blytheville AFB, Arkansas, serving in the Accounting and Finance office. While at Blytheville, he led a project to establish the base's Rod and Gun Club and helped develop a modest trap range. He also continued his studies through the on-base graduate school program and received an MS in Management from the University of Arkansas, Fayetteville, in 1974. Later, he received a direct commission into the Medical Service Corps and was promoted as a Second Lieutenant. After a few months of training at Sheppard Air Force Base, Texas, he was assigned to Ellsworth Air Force Base, South Dakota, near Rapid City, as an Assistant Hospital Administrator. Potterfield completed his commitment to the Air Force in 1977 holding the rank of First Lieutenant.

== Social career and philanthropy ==
In 2011, Larry Potterfield, his wife, Brenda, and Dick Leeper, the Executive Director of the MidwayUSA Foundation, developed the Youth Wildlife Conservation Experience (YWCE), a program designed to provide an opportunity for high school students across the United States to learn about conservation, ethical hunting practices and wildlife management. The Potterfields are reported to have donated several million dollars to help provide YWCE programs to organizations such as Dallas Safari Club, Wild Sheep Foundation, Wild Turkey Federation, Rocky Mountain Elk Foundation, Kansas City Safari Club, Houston Safari Club, Mule Deer Foundation, Pheasants Forever and Quality Deer Management.

The MidwayUSA Foundation, founded by Larry and Brenda Potterfield in 2007, is involved in helping communities and organizations raise money for education and youth shooting activities. As of September 30, 2022, the MidwayUSA Foundation is known to have $240 million in assets, have paid $54.6 million in grants, and assisted 2,770 teams with endowments.

Potterfield, who is credited with conceptualizing the Friends of NRA Fundraising banquets, organized the first such banquet in Columbia, Missouri in October 1992. The concept has since been expanded to cover the other parts of the country and as per claims by the NRA, the banquets have been held at over 16,000 events, reaching over 2.8 million attendees, and raising over $970 million through its fundraising programs for The NRA Foundation, the charitable arm of the organization. On January 2, 1992, Potterfield requested MidwayUSA customers to round up their bills to the next higher dollar and the money raised through the initiative is known to have been donated to the National Endowment for the Protection of the 2nd Amendment. A part of the endowment is utilized by the NRA to affect legislation of firearms in the United States. MidwayUSA is reported to have raised nearly $20 million for the NRA/ILA National Endowment for the Protection of the 2nd Amendment since the inception of the NRA Round-Up initiative.

== Awards and recognition ==
Larry Potterfield received the Entrepreneur Of The Year Central Midwest Award from Ernst and Young in 2012. Under his leadership, MidwayUSA received the Missouri Quality Award from the Excellence in Missouri Foundation in 2008, 2015 and the Malcolm Baldrige National Quality Award in 2009 and 2015. The National Rifle Association honored Potterfield's contributions in 2014, with their Life of Liberty Leadership Award. The same year, in 2014, the Outdoor Channel conferred on him the Honorary Lifetime Achievement Award for his contributions and activism in the outdoor community. In 2015, Larry and his wife Brenda were presented with the Beretta Conservation Leadership Award at the inaugural Beretta and SCI Foundation Conservation Leadership Award Gala. That same year they were also presented with the John L. Morris Award, by the Association of Fish & Wildlife Agencies, for their extensive contributions to wildlife conservation. In 2017, NRA Publications honored Larry and Brenda Potterfield with the 2017 Golden Bullseye Pioneer Award. The Golden Bullseye Pioneer Award recognizes exemplary achievement by individuals responsible for the development, introduction and promotion of equipment that has made a profound and enduring impact on the way Americans shoot and hunt. Also in 2017, Larry and Brenda were awarded the Peter Hathaway Capstick Hunting Heritage Award at the Dallas Safari Club. The award was established to bring honor and recognition to an individual, organization, or group whose achievements reveal a sustained and significant contribution to the conservation of wildlife and its habitats. Larry and Brenda received the prestigious C.J. McElroy Award from Safari Club International in 2018. Named for SCI founder C.J. McElroy, the award honors members of the worldwide hunting industry who have made tremendous contributions to the sport of hunting.

== See also ==
- National Rifle Association of America
- Friends of NRA
