= Model Citizens =

- Country of origin: United States
- No. of episodes: 7

Original release
- Network: PAX TV
- Release: October 4 – November 15, 2004

Model Citizens is a reality television show that aired on Pax TV in 2004. A group of five Models (known here as the "Model Squad") travel to different parts of the United States and work on community projects such as building a basketball court or an aviary. The show was hosted by Larissa Meek of Average Joe: Hawaii, a model and former Miss Missouri USA and Miss USA contestant.

== Episodes ==
1. "A Place Called Home"
2. "Bayside Community Center"
3. "Building an Aviary"
4. "Camp Starfish"
5. "New Hampshire Beach Clean-Up"
6. "P.E.A.C.E.: Project Greenhouse"
7. "Utica Fire Station"
