= Sophia Dominguez-Heithoff =

American lawyer and former Miss Teen USA

- Born: Sophia Julieta Dominguez-Heithoff; March 13, 2000 (age 26); Kansas City, Missouri, U.S.
- Education: University of Kansas (BA); USC Gould School of Law
- Height: 5 ft 10 in (1.78 m)
- Beauty pageant titleholder
- Title: Miss Missouri Teen USA 2017; Miss Teen USA 2017
- Hair color: Brown
- Eye color: Brown
- Major competitions: Miss Missouri Teen USA 2017 (Winner); Miss Teen USA 2017 (Winner)

Sophia Julieta Dominguez-Heithoff (born March 13, 2000) is an American lawyer, model, and former pageant titleholder who was crowned Miss Teen USA 2017. She is the second entrant from Missouri to win the title after Marissa Whitley won Miss Teen USA 2001.

== Life and career ==
=== Early life and education ===
Dominguez-Heithoff was born in Kansas City, Missouri to a military family, with her mother serving in the United States Air Force. On her maternal side she is of German descent, while on her paternal side she is Mexican. She graduated from Park Hill South High School a year early in 2017, and graduated from the University of Kansas in three years, where she studied political science and international studies and was a member of Phi Beta Kappa (ΦΒΚ) honor society. She graduated with a JD from the University of Southern California Gould School of Law and is now a practicing attorney in California. She is a member of Pi Beta Phi (ΠΒΦ) sorority.

Dominguez-Heithoff has lobbied with members of the Missouri Senate and Missouri House of Representatives to pass a law to assist adults with developmental disabilities in the state of Missouri.

=== Pageantry ===
Dominguez-Heithoff was crowned Miss Missouri Teen USA 2017 on September 25, 2016, along with Miss Missouri USA 2017 Bayleigh Dayton. She later competed at Miss Teen USA 2017 in Phoenix, Arizona on July 29, 2017. Dominguez-Heithoff went on to win the competition, beating out first runner-up Vanessa Matheson of Oregon. She is the third Hispanic person to win the title of Miss Teen USA after Charlotte Lopez in 1993, and Hilary Cruz in 2007.

Awards and achievements
| Preceded by (Texas) Karlie Hay | Miss Teen USA; 2017 | Succeeded by (Kansas) Hailey Colborn |
| Preceded by Dallas Ezard | Miss Missouri Teen USA; 2017 | Succeeded by Chloe Bartlett |
