= MQA =

MQA or mqa may refer to:

== Organisations ==
- Malaysian Qualifications Agency, a statutory body in Malaysia
- Mauritius Qualifications Authority, a government organisation

== Other uses ==
- Maba language (Indonesia) (ISO 639-3 code)
- Mandora Station Airport (IATA code)
- Missouri Quality Award, of Excellence in Missouri Foundation
- Marchio di Qualità Ambientale (Environmental Quality Brand), a project in the Parco Nazionale delle Cinque Terre, Italy
- Master Quality Authenticated, a proprietary audio codec
