= Scantlin =

Scantlin is a surname. Notable people with the surname include:

- Melana Scantlin (born 1977), American television host, writer, and beauty pageant winner
- Wes Scantlin (born 1972), American singer-songwriter and musician

== See also ==
- Scantling (surname)
