= Larissa Meek =

American beauty pageant contestant

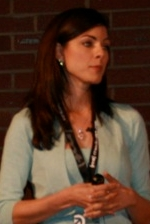
- Height: 5 ft 8 in (1.73 m)
- Beauty pageant titleholder
- Title: Miss Missouri Teen USA 1997; Miss Missouri USA 2001
- Hair color: Brown
- Eye color: Green
- Major competitions: Miss Teen USA 1997; Miss USA 2001 (4th runner-up)

Larissa Meek is a former beauty queen who has competed in the Miss Teen USA and Miss USA pageants and a reality television personality who starred in Average Joe: Hawaii.

== Pageants ==
In 1996 Meek won the Miss Missouri Teen USA 1997 title and competed in the Miss Teen USA 1997 pageant held at South Padre Island, Texas. She did not place but did earn an Honorable Mention (for placing between 11th and 15th place).

In 2000 she competed in the Miss Missouri USA pageant for the first time and won the title. Meek represented Missouri at the Miss USA 2001 pageant telecast live from Gary, Indiana in March 2001, and made the semifinals. Meek won both the swimsuit and evening gown competitions with scores of 9.45 and 9.39 respectively and advanced to the top five but failed to make the top three after finishing last in the interview competition. She placed fourth runner-up to Texas' Kandace Krueger.

== Reality television ==
In 2003 she appeared as the star of the reality television show Average Joe: Hawaii, succeeding fellow Miss Missouri Teen USA and Miss Missouri USA titleholder Melana Scantlin for this role. When the show started she went on dates with "average Joes". Partway through the show, however, a bunch of "hunks" were brought in to compete against the Joes, a twist also used on the first edition of the show. When down to the final two men, Meek chose Gil Hyatt over "average Joe" Brian Worth, only to have Hyatt "reject" her after finding out that she previously had dated male supermodel Fabio.

In 2004, Meek hosted a short-lived reality television show on PAX (now Ion Television) Model Citizenswhere a group of five models (known here as the "Model Squad") travelled to different parts of the United States as they worked on community projects such as building a basketball court or an aviary. The series premiered on October 4, 2004 until its cancellation on November 15, 2004 after seven episodes.

Preceded by Denette Roderick	Miss Missouri USA; 2001	Succeeded by Melana Scantlin
