= James Williams (defensive lineman) =

American football player (born 2004)

No. 8 – Oklahoma State Cowboys
- Position: Defensive end
- Class: Redshirt Senior

Personal information
- Born: June 16, 2004 (age 22)
- Listed height: 6 ft 5 in (1.96 m)
- Listed weight: 256 lb (116 kg)

Career information
- High school: Park Hill South (Riverside, Missouri)
- College: Iowa Central CC (2022); Nebraska (2023–2024); Florida State (2025); Oklahoma State (2026–present)
- Stats at ESPN

James Williams (born June 16, 2004) is an American college football defensive end for the Oklahoma State Cowboys. He previously played for the Nebraska Cornhuskers and Florida State Seminoles.

== Early life ==
Williams attended Park Hill South High School in Riverside, Missouri. As a senior he had 108 tackles with 18 sacks and was named Suburban Red Conference Defensive Player of the Year.

== College career ==
Williams played at Iowa Central Community College in 2022 and had 19 tackles and six sacks. He transferred to the University of Nebraska–Lincoln after the season. In his first year at Nebraska in 2023, Williams redshirted after playing in four games and had four tackles and two sacks. As a redshirt sophomore in 2024, he played in 12 games and recorded 14 tackles and five sacks. After the season, Williams entered the transfer portal and transferred to Florida State University.
