= Miss Missouri Teen USA =

Beauty contest

- Formation: 1983
- Type: Beauty pageant
- Headquarters: Shawnee
- Location: Kansas
- Members: Miss Teen USA
- Official language: English
- Key people: John M. Vannatta; Jason Vannatta; Jennifer Vannatta-Fisher, State Pageant Director
- Website: Official website

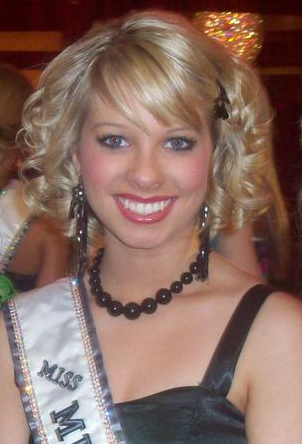
Jeni Dixon, Miss Missouri Teen USA 2008

The Miss Missouri Teen USA competition is the pageant that selects the representative for the state of Missouri in the Miss Teen USA pageant. It is directed by Vanbros and Associates, based in Shawnee, Kansas. In 1993, Missouri joined the Vanbros group of state pageants for the Miss USA and Teen USA system.

Missouri is in the top 10 most successful states at Miss Teen USA in terms of number and value of placements. Ten Missouri teens have gone on to compete at Miss USA, although only eight as Miss Missouri USA. The other two represented Kansas, another Vanbros state.

Two notable Miss Missouri Teen USAs (who first both later won the title Miss Missouri USA) are Larissa Meek and Melana Scantlin, who appeared on the reality TV show Average Joe, another one is Brenda Smith-Lezama who represent Panama in Miss Universe 2021.

Vegas Turner of Springfield was crowned Miss Missouri Teen USA on May 10, 2026, at The Mansion Theater for the Performing Arts in Branson, Missouri. She will represent Missouri at Miss Teen USA 2026.

== Results summary ==
=== Placements ===
- Miss Teen USAs: Marissa Whitley (2001), Sophia Dominguez-Heithoff (2017), Mailyn Marsh (2025)
- 2nd runners-up: Audra Shurman (1991)
- 4th runners-up: Rhonda Hoglen (1985), Sydnee Stottlemyre (2011)
- Top 6: Tiffany Meyer (1994), Leah Sexton (1996)
- Top 10: Caitlin McIntosh (2000), Vegas Turner (2026)
- Top 12: Tavia Shackles (1990), Melana Scantlin (1995)
- Top 15: Alissa Reitmeier (2004), Sierra Drimak (2009), Christina Stratton (2015), Dallas Ezard (2016)
- Top 16: Brenda Smith-Lezama (2013)^{‡}, Anna Long (2021)
- Top 20: Madison Beck (2023)

Missouri holds a record of 19 placements at Miss Teen USA.

‡ Voted into Top 16 as America's Choice

=== Awards ===
- Miss Photogenic: Melanie Breedlove (1993), Christina Stratton (2015)
- Miss Congeniality: Rachel Woolard (2005)

== Winners ==
- Declared as Winner
- Ended as runner-up
- Ended as one of the finalists or semifinalists

Year	Name	Hometown	Age^{1}	Local title	Placement at Miss Teen USA	Special awards at Miss Teen USA	Notes
2026	Vegas Turner	Springfield	18	Miss Battlefield Teen	Top 10		Previously National All-American Miss Teen 2024-2025
2025	Mailyn Marsh	Ozark	17	Miss Ozark Teen	Miss Teen USA 2025		Later 1st Runner-Up to Miss Teen Universe 2026; Daughter of Miss Kansas USA 1999 & Miss Kansas Teen USA 1996, Amanda Carraway
2024	Shelby Welling	Jefferson City	18	Miss Capital City Teen	Top 20		
2023	Madison Beck	Barnhart	18	Miss Jefferson County Teen	Top 20		Later Miss Missouri USA 2026
2022	Shae Addison Smith	Bolivar	18	Miss Springfield Teen			Previously Miss Missouri's Outstanding Teen 2019; 4th runner-up at Miss America's Outstanding Teen 2020; Later Miss Missouri USA 2025
2021	Anna Long	Lake Winnebago	17	Miss Lake Winnebago Teen	Top 16		
2020	Holly McDowell	Lee's Summit	15	Miss Greater Lee's Summit Teen			
2019	Abilene Lortz	St. James	15	Miss Vienna Teen			
2018	Chloe Bartlett	Liberal	18	Miss Truman Teen			Daughter of Miss Missouri USA 1990 Lori Suschnick
2017	Sophia Julieta Dominguez-Heithoff	Kansas City	16	Miss City of Fountain Teen	Miss Teen USA 2017		
2016	Dallas Ezard	St. Louis	18	Miss Lake of the Ozark Teen	Top 15		Daughter of Miss Missouri USA 1993 Stephanie Nunn Ezard.
2015	Christina Stratton	Sedalia	15	Miss Sedalia Teen	Top 15	Miss Photogenic	Later Miss Missouri's Outstanding Teen 2016; Top 8 at Miss America's Outstanding Teen 2017
2014	Samantha Jo Bowers	Harrisonville	18	Miss Cass County Teen			
2013	Brenda Andrea Smith-Lezama	Columbia	18	Miss Columbia Teen	Top 16		Student at University of Missouri at the time of crowning; Later Mexicana Universal Ciudad de México 2019; 2nd runner up at Mexicana Universal 2020; Later Señorita Panamá 2021; Top 16 at Miss Universe 2021
2012	Jayde Ogle	Liberty	17	Miss Stone County Teen			
2011	Sydnee Nicole Stottlemyre	St. Louis	17	Miss Gateway St. Louis Teen	4th runner-up		Previously Miss Missouri's Outstanding Teen 2008; 4th runner up at Miss America's Outstanding Teen 2009; Later Miss Missouri USA 2016; Top 10 at Miss USA 2016
2010	Erica Danielle Sturdefant	Springfield	16	Miss Metropolis Teen			Later Miss Missouri USA 2014
2009	Sierra Drimak	Cottleville	18	Miss Cottleville Teen	Top 15		
2008	Jeni Dixon	Hartville	17	Miss Wright County Teen			
2007	Lauren Petersen	Farmington	16	Miss St. Francois Co. Teen			Later Miss Grand USA 2015
2006	Breanna Huellinghorst	O'Fallon	16	Miss Black River Festival Teen			
2005	Rachel Joy Woolard	Naylor	17	Miss Black River Festival Teen		Miss Congeniality	
2004	Alissa Marie Reitmeier	St. Charles	17	Miss Butler County Fair Teen	Top 15		
2003	Amber Marie Seyer	Oran	17	Miss Scott County Teen			Later Miss Missouri USA 2007; Top 10 Miss USA 2007
2002	Courtney Chilcutt	Dexter	18	Miss Butler County Fair Teen			
2001	Marissa Janine Whitley	Springfield	17	Miss Glendale Teen	Miss Teen USA 2001		
2000	Caitlin Marie McIntosh	New Haven	17	Miss New Haven Teen	Top 10		3rd runner up at Miss Oktoberfest 2002
1999	Andrea Camille Elliott	Independence	18	Miss Kansas City Teen			
1998	Brittany Paige McDonald	Sikeston	17	Miss Sikeston Teen			
1997	Larissa Meek	St. Louis	17	Miss Gateway to the West Teen			Later Miss Missouri USA 2001; Finished 5th at Miss USA 2001
1996	Leah Audrey Sexton	Independence	17	Miss Three Trails Teen	Top 6		
1995	Melana Scantlin	Gladstone	19	Miss Kansas City Teen	Top 12		Later Miss Missouri USA 2002
1994	Tiffany Tenille Meyer	Parkville	18	Miss Platte Teen	Top 6		Later Miss Kansas USA 2000; Finished 4th at Miss USA 2000; 2nd runner-up at Miss Oktoberfest 2001 as Miss Missouri
1993	Melanie Jeanine Breedlove	Mountain Grove	18	Miss South Central Missouri Teen		Miss Photogenic	Later Miss Missouri USA 1998; 2nd runner-up at Miss USA 1998
1992	Robin Swain	Lilbourn	18				
1991	Audra Lynn Sherman	Sikeston	18		2nd Runner-up		
1990	Tavia Michelle Shackles	Lee's Summit	18		Top 12		Later Miss Kansas USA 1993; 2nd runner up at Miss USA 1993; Later married Kansas City Chiefs owner and CEO Clark Hunt; Mother of Gracie Hunt, Miss Kansas USA 2021; Daughter-in-law of Chiefs and AFL and MLS founder Lamar Hunt
1989	April Renee Smith	Raytown	17				
1988	Beverly Boatright	Republic	18				
1987	Sherri Ann Gardner	Kansas City	17				
1986	Jennifer Tangora	Mexico	18				
1985	Rhonda Hoglen	Gladstone	18		4th runner-up		Later Miss Missouri USA 1989
1984	Lee Ann Sydenstricker	Mexico	17				
1983	Lisa Yvette Logan	Columbia	16				

^{1} Age at the time of the Miss Teen USA pageant
