= Park Hill South High School =

Location
- 4500 NW River Park Drive; Riverside, Missouri 64150; United States; 39°10′32″N 94°37′34″W

Information
- Type: Public high school
- Established: 1998
- School district: Park Hill School District
- Superintendent: Michael Kimbrel
- CEEB code: 262802
- Principal: Corey Willich
- Teaching staff: 107.57 (FTE)
- Grades: 9–12
- Enrollment: 1,869 (2023–2024)
- Student to teacher ratio: 17.37
- Hours in school day: Monday; 7 (8:10 am to 3:18 pm); Tuesday; 7 (8:10 am to 3:18 pm); Wednesday; 7 (8:10 am to 3:18 pm); Thursday; 7 (8:10 am to 3:18 pm); Friday; 7 (8:10 am to 3:18 pm)
- Classrooms: 68
- Campus type: Suburban
- Colors: Purple and black
- Team name: Panthers
- Rival: Park Hill Trojans; North Kansas City Hornets
- Newspaper: The View
- Website: phs.parkhill.k12.mo.us

Park Hill South High School is the second established high school in the Park Hill School District, located on the outskirts of Kansas City, Missouri in Riverside, Missouri, United States.

In addition to Riverside, the school's attendance boundary includes portions of Kansas City, as well as Houston Lake, Northmoor, and almost all of Parkville.

== History ==
Park Hill South opened in fall 1998. It had a cost of $24,130,000. The first year there was no senior class, as Park Hill South had been split from Park Hill High School and the seniors of 1999 were allowed to remain at Park Hill High School for their last year. The first senior class to graduate from Park Hill South was the class of 2000. The class of 2002 was the first class to complete a 4-year course at Park Hill South.

=== Athletics ===
Park Hill South fields team in the following areas: baseball, basketball, cheerleading, cross country, dance, football, golf, soccer, softball, swimming, tennis, track, volleyball, and wrestling,

The Park Hill South coed cheerleading team won the Missouri State Cheerleading Competition in 2002 and 2006. The Park Hill South swim team has had nine top-20 Missouri state finishes and 11 straight conference wins from 1998 to 2008.

=== Extracurricular activities ===
The band, jazz band, orchestra, and choir programs at Park Hill South regularly receive first division (superior) ratings at state, regional, and national contests. In 2010, the Symphonic Band, under the direction of Dr. Craig Miller, performed at the Missouri Music Educators Association conference at Tan-Tar-A Resort in Osage Beach, Missouri. In 2011, the A Cappella Choir, under the direction of Elizabeth Brockhoff, and the Symphonic Orchestra, under the direction of Valerie Bell, performed at the same conference. Also in 2011, the Symphonic Band and Symphonic Orchestra traveled to New York City, New York to perform at the National Band and Orchestra Festival at Carnegie Hall under the conductors Dr Craig Miller and Valerie Bell. Both groups received first division (superior) ratings. In 2011 Valerie Bell retired and Diane Markley became the new director of the orchestral music program. In January 2013, the Symphonic Orchestra, under the direction of Diane Markley, once again performed at the Missouri Music Educators Association conference. The performance was described as a wonderfully musical performance of an excellent selection of music.

In 2011, the Park Hill South Scholar Bowl team qualified for the Missouri State High School Activities Association state championship tournament. The Park Hill South Scholar Bowl team was the first Scholar Bowl team from the Park Hill School District to qualify for the state tournament. The team placed third. The Scholar Bowl team also qualified to compete in the National Academic Quiz Tournaments High School National Championship, held in Atlanta, Georgia. They finished the first day of competition with a record of four wins and six losses, therefore not qualifying to compete in the second day of competition.

In 2022, the theatre department had placed 4th place in finals for their one-act Elephant's Graveyard at Missouri State High School Activities Association’ state tournament.

In 2023, the theatre department had placed 1st place in finals for their one-act Medea at Missouri State High School Activities Association’ state tournament.

=== Controversies ===
In October 2020, after the George Floyd protests, some volleyball players chose to wear "together we rise" t-shirts to a volleyball game against rival North Kansas City. They had seen the slogan at the Parkville 'March for Unity' over the summer, a protest in solidarity of the plight of people of color in the United States. The interim Principal, Dr. Kerrie Herren, "stormed" onto the court to command students to take off the shirts, arguing that students shouldn't wear shirts supporting the Ku Klux Klan to athletic activities.

In October 2021, a group of freshmen football players at Park Hill South High School started and circulated a Change.org petition to "Start slavery again" online through Snapchat. Many students disliked the response by the administration, citing a lack of transparency and response. Some students responsible for the petition were suspended; they later sued the school for First Amendment infringements.

Between November 2023 and March 2024, a Park Hill South substitute teacher, football coach, and former student—Dillon Thomas—allegedly had an inappropriate relationship with a female student over text. Thomas had allegedly solicited meetings off-campus and oral sex. For this, he was arrested and terminated from his position.

=== Notable alumni ===
- Sebastian James (singer), American rock musician
- Chase Bromstedt, former professional soccer player, MASL for Kansas City Comets
- Sophia Dominguez-Heithoff, Miss Teen USA 2017
- Tommy Hottovy, MLB pitcher, coach
- James Williams, college football defensive end for the Florida State Seminoles
- Jacob Garza, professional soccer player, MASL for Kansas City Comets
- Mason Love, kicker for the South Carolina Gamecocks
- Thomas Garrett, runs XC for the Drake University Bulldogs
