= MidwayUSA =

American hunting and outdoor retailer

MidwayUSA, Inc.
- Type: Private
- Founded: 1977; 49 years ago
- Headquarters: Columbia, Missouri
- Key people: Larry Potterfield (Founder & Chairman of the Board of Directors)
- Products: shooting, hunting, camping supplies gunsmithing accessories, fishing
- Revenue: 525,000,000 (2024)
- Total assets: 100,000,000 (2024)
- Website: midwayusa.com

MidwayUSA is a family-owned American retailer of various hunting and outdoor-related products. The company is headquartered in Columbia, Missouri, and sells in the continental United States. The company markets online.

== History ==
MidwayUSA, originally established as Ely Arms, Inc., began as a small firearms retailer in Columbia, Missouri, on June 18, 1977. It was established by Larry Potterfield, with initial co-ownership by his brother Jerry, in a 151 square metres (1,630 sq ft) metal, pole-frame building. Jerry later sold his interest in the company to Larry in 1980 and returned home to farm.

The mail-order division was started quite modestly later in 1977, with a small offering of ‘hand-made’ 8mm Japanese pistol ammunition and 25 Remington rifle ammunition. In 1980, Midway received the first shipment of what was to be a total production run of 500,000 rounds of 8mm Nambu brass, produced by B.E.L.L. Labs of Chicago. Much of this brass was loaded into ammunition and can still be found at gun shows in a bright orange box. The first press releases were under the name Ely Arms, Inc., which turned out to be in conflict with the Eley Division of Kynoch Industry; the term Eley was trademarked. Ely Arms, Inc. was subsequently renamed to Midway Arms, Inc., to avoid the conflict. The name Midway comes from the small community of Midway, in which the business was originally located. The name MidwayUSA was adopted as a DBA in April 1998. Starline Brass was just starting up in the mid-1970s and MidwayUSA became their first distributor of bulk pistol brass, and in turn, the grandfather of the bulk components business in the United States. Winchester began selling bulk components to MidwayUSA in 1984, and later to Remington in 1987. The Firearm Owners Protection Act was passed in 1986, modifying the 1968 Gun Control Act to allow the sale of cartridge cases directly to the end consumer. MidwayUSA immediately began conducting direct-to-consumer sales in addition to continuing to sell to FFL holders.

In 1987 MidwayUSA began adding other reloading products, the first of which was Lee Precision.

Computerization played a major role in the development of MidwayUSA; Potterfield had one computer class in college, and in 1982 he purchased the company's first computer, an Apple III. In 1986 he bought the company's first IBM PC; in March 1987 they began networking their computers together. All of this is the basis for the Information System and Website Management Departments at MidwayUSA today.

In 2014 MidwayUSA became an online-only retailer, moving away from mail orders and the master catalog upon which the company was built.

== Modern management practices ==
MidwayUSA is a proponent of the use of modern management practices in business management. Modern management practices include Baldrige, Lean, ISO and Six Sigma. MidwayUSA received the Malcolm Baldrige National Quality Award in 2009, 2015, and 2021. MidwayUSA is one of only two organizations to earn the award three times since the first award cycle in 1988. The 2015 Baldrige National Quality Award was a follow-up to MidwayUSA's receipt of the Missouri Quality Award from the Excellence in Missouri Foundation in 2015, an award the organization also received in 2008.

== NRA support ==
Larry and Brenda Potterfield created two programs and several educational endowments in the NRA Foundation. Brenda also served as the Vice President of the NRA Foundation's Board of Trustees. In 1992, MidwayUSA started the NRA round-up, asking customers to round up the total of each order and donate the change to the NRA/ILA.
