= Scantling (surname) =

Scantling is a surname. Notable people with the surname include:

- Garrett Scantling (born 1993), American decathlete
- Marquez Valdes-Scantling (born 1994), American football player

== See also ==
- Scantlin, surname
