= Miss USA 2001 =

50th Miss USA pageant

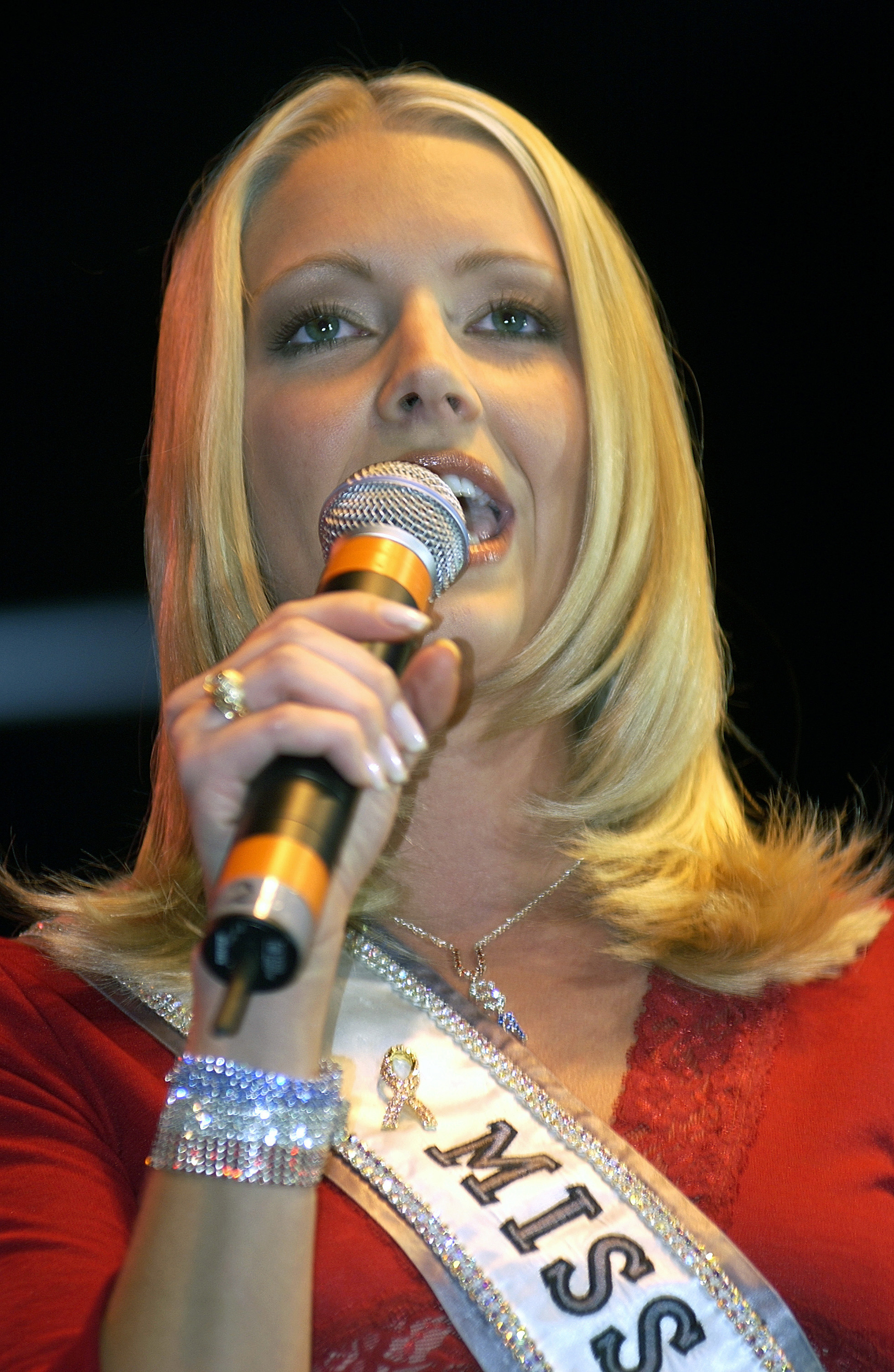
- Miss USA 2001 Kandace Krueger
- Date: March 2, 2001
- Presenters: William Shatner; Tommy Davidson; Vanessa Minnillo; Lara Dutta
- Entertainment: Lara Fabian; Evan and Jaron; The Warren Brothers
- Venue: Genesis Convention Center, Gary, Indiana
- Broadcaster: CBS; WBBM-TV
- Entrants: 51
- Placements: 10
- Winner: Kandace Krueger; Texas
- Congeniality: Monica Palumbo (North Carolina)
- Photogenic: Katee Doland (Colorado)

Miss USA 2001 was the 50th Miss USA pageant, held at the Genesis Convention Center in Gary, Indiana on March 2, 2001. The event was won by Kandace Krueger of Texas, who was crowned by outgoing queen Lynnette Cole of Tennessee.

The pageant was held in Gary for the first time, at the Genesis Convention Center. The city spent more than $6 million to prepare for the pageant.

William Shatner hosted the pageant and color commentary was provided by Tommy Davidson, Vanessa Minnillo, Miss Teen USA 1998 and reigning Miss Universe Lara Dutta. Entertainment was provided by Lara Fabian, Evan and Jaron and The Warren Brothers.

== Results ==
=== Placements ===
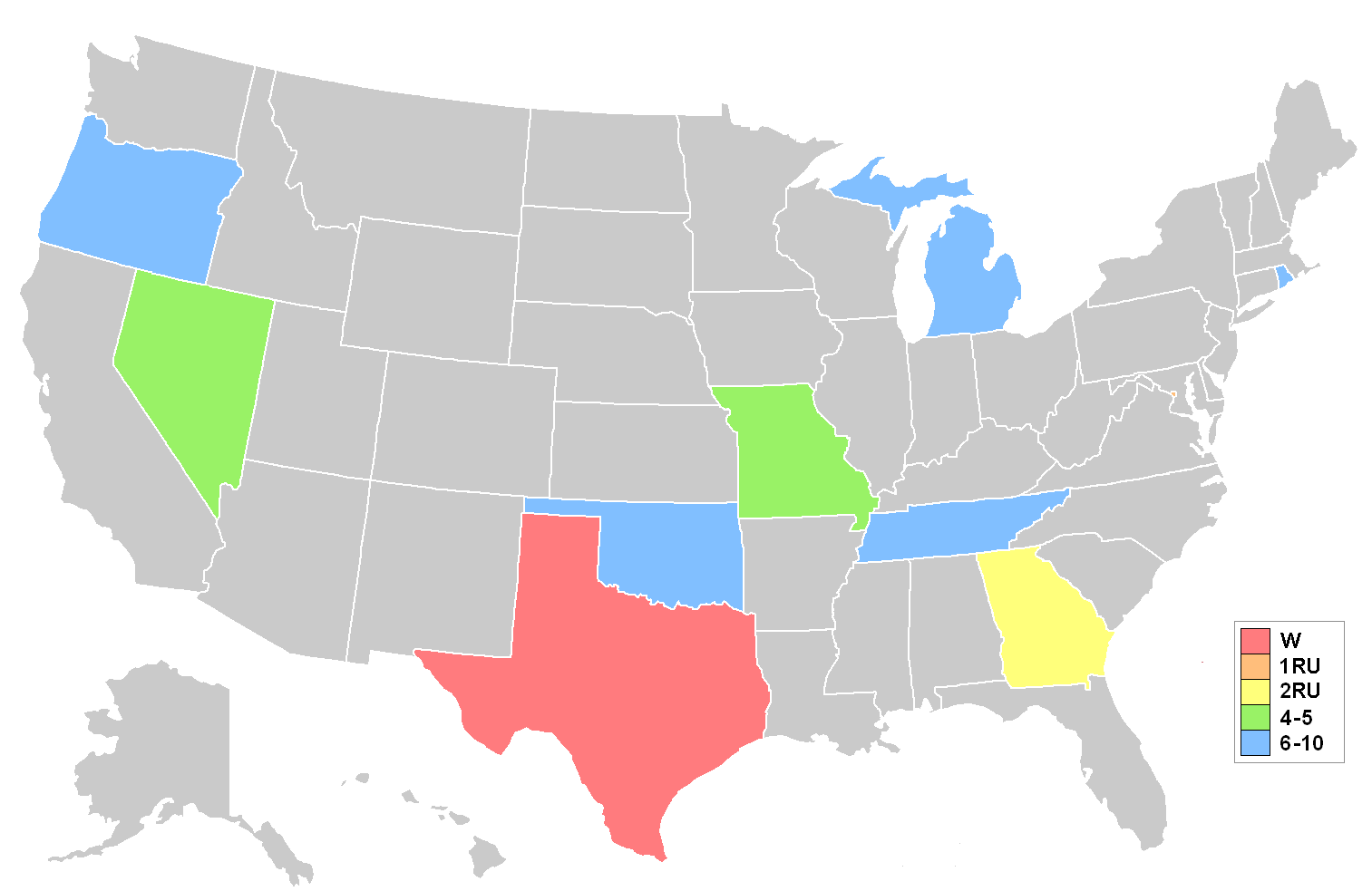
Map showing placements by state

Final results	Contestant
Miss USA 2001	Texas – Kandace Krueger
1st Runner-Up	(Washington, D.C.) District of Columbia – Liane Angus
2nd Runner-Up	(Georgia (U.S. state)) Georgia – Tiffany Fallon
Top 5	Missouri – Larissa Meek; Nevada – Gina Giacinto
Top 10	Michigan – Kenya Howard; Oklahoma – Cortney Phillips; Oregon – Endia Abrante; Rhode Island – Yanaiza Alvarez; Tennessee – Lisa Tollett

=== Special awards ===
Award	Contestant
Miss Congeniality	North Carolina – Monica Palumbo
Miss Photogenic	Colorado – Katee Doland
Clairol Natural Instincts Style Award	Maryland – Megan Gunning

== Delegates ==
The Miss USA 2001 delegates were:

- Alabama – Laura Hoffman
- Alaska – Ivette Fernandez
- Arizona – Tasha Dixon
- Arkansas – Jessie Davis
- California – Jennifer Glover
- Colorado – Katee Doland
- Connecticut – Amy Vanderoef
- Delaware – Stacey Smith
- District of Columbia – Liane Angus
- Florida – Julie Donaldson
- Georgia – Tiffany Fallon
- Hawaii – Christy Leonard
- Idaho – Elizabeth Barchas
- Illinois – Rebecca Ambrosi
- Indiana – Sarah McClary
- Iowa – Clarissa Kroese
- Kansas – Kristie Knox
- Kentucky – Jo Pritchard
- Louisiana – Heather Hayden
- Maine – Melissa Bard
- Maryland – Megan Gunning
- Massachusetts – Dana Powell
- Michigan – Kenya Howard
- Minnesota – Anne Clausen
- Mississippi – Melanie Vaughn
- Missouri – Larissa Meek
- Montana – CaCe Hardy
- Nebraska – Sujoing Drakeford
- Nevada – Gina Giacinto
- New Hampshire – Melissa Robbins
- New Jersey – Jeanette Josue
- New Mexico – Jennifer Adams
- New York – Lisa Pavlakis
- North Carolina – Monica Palumbo
- North Dakota – Michelle Guthmiller
- Ohio – Amanda Canary
- Oklahoma – Cortney Phillips
- Oregon – Endia Li Abrante
- Pennsylvania – Jennifer Watkins
- Rhode Island – Yanaiza Alvarez
- South Carolina – Candace Richards
- South Dakota – Beth Lovro
- Tennessee – Lisa Tollett
- Texas – Kandace Krueger
- Utah – Tiffany Seaman
- Vermont – Katy Johnson
- Virginia – Kristel Jenkins
- Washington – Bre Sakas
- West Virginia – Karen Long
- Wisconsin – Kari Jo Dodge
- Wyoming – Heather Jackelen

== See also ==
- Miss Universe 2001
