= Miss Teen USA 2017 =

35th edition of the Miss Teen USA competition

- Date: July 29, 2017
- Presenters: Heidi Powell; Erin Lim
- Entertainment: Jorge Blanco
- Venue: Phoenix Symphony Hall, Phoenix, Arizona
- Broadcaster: Facebook; Mixer; PlayStation Network; Xbox Live; YouTube
- Entrants: 51
- Placements: 15
- Winner: Sophia Dominguez-Heithoff; Missouri
- Congeniality: Alexa Papigiotis; Rhode Island
- Photogenic: Briahna Reinstein; New Jersey

Miss Teen USA 2017 was the 35th Miss Teen USA pageant held at the Phoenix Symphony Hall in Phoenix, Arizona on July 29, 2017. Karlie Hay of Texas crowned her successor, Sophia Dominguez-Heithoff of Missouri at the end of the event. The pageant was hosted by celebrity personal trainer and author Heidi Powell and E! correspondent Erin Lim, while Mexican singer Jorge Blanco performed.

It was the first time the pageant was held in Arizona and the first to broadcast in high dynamic range (HDR) color, virtual reality and on PlayStation consoles.

This was the final year that Miss USA and Miss Teen USA pageants have held separately, due to scheduling changes of the succeeding year's pageant that Dominguez-Heithoff would be the shortest reigning titleholders in the pageant, which held for nine months and 19 days.

== Pageant ==
=== Selection of contestants ===
One delegate from the 50 states and the District of Columbia were selected in state pageants held from September 2016 to February 2017.

=== Preliminary round ===
Prior to the final competition, the delegates compete in the preliminary competition, which involves private interviews with the judges and a presentation show where they compete in athletic wear and evening gown. It was held on July 28, one day before the finals.

=== Finals ===
During the final competition, the top 15 finalists compete in athletic wear, evening gown and in a customized final question round, and the winner is decided by a panel of judges.

=== Broadcasting ===
All rounds of the pageant were webcast on the Miss U mobile app, the pageant's Facebook page and as downloadable live events available on the PlayStation Store for PlayStation 4 consoles. The final round was also streamed on Xbox One consoles via Mixer, with support for high dynamic range (HDR) using the HDR10 standard, (Note: Xbox One S models only) and on Xbox 360 consoles via Xbox Live.

For the first time, 360-degree broadcasts of the pageant were available for the Google Daydream, PlayStation VR and Samsung Gear VR headsets.

== Judges ==
- K. Lee Graham – Miss Teen USA 2014 from South Carolina
- Divya Gugnani – entrepreneur and cofounder of Wander Beauty
- Kalani Hilliker – dancer, actress, and model
- Tamaya Petteway – businesswoman and Senior Vice President of Endemol Shine North America's Brand and Licensing Partnerships Division
- Syleste Rodriguez – news anchor

== Contestants ==
Contestant stats provided via the Miss Universe Organization.

State	Name	Age (Note: Ages at the time of the pageant)	Hometown	Height	Placement	Notes
Alabama	Claire Scott	17	Vestavia Hills	5 ft 7 in (1.70 m)		
Alaska	Tana Bartels	19	Fairbanks			Later 4th runner-up at Miss Alaska USA 2020; Later 2nd runner-up at Miss Alaska USA 2021
Arizona	Karly Riggs	17	Scottsdale	5 ft 8 in (1.73 m)	Top 15	
Arkansas	Allison Tucker	17	Clarksville	5 ft 6 in (1.68 m)		
California	Jaanu Patel	16	Huntington Beach	5 ft 9 in (1.75 m)	4th runner-up	
Colorado	Alexis Glover	18	Colorado Springs	5 ft 7 in (1.70 m)		Later Miss Colorado USA 2022
Connecticut	Lana Coffey	18	New Canaan	5 ft 11 in (1.80 m)		Sister of Tatiana Pallagi, Miss New York Teen USA 2007
Delaware	Grace Lange	17	Newark	6 ft 0 in (1.83 m)		Later Miss Delaware USA 2022
District of Columbia	Karis Felton	17	Washington, D.C.	5 ft 6 in (1.68 m)		
Florida	Victoria DiSorbo	19	Pembroke Pines	5 ft 9 in (1.75 m)		
Georgia	Taylor Ward	18	Valdosta			
Hawaii	Lauren Teruya	19	Honolulu	5 ft 8 in (1.73 m)		Later Miss Hawaii 2022; Sister of Kathryn Teruya, Miss Hawaii Teen USA 2012 and Miss Hawaii 2017
Idaho	Gabriella Simpson	18	Boise	5 ft 7 in (1.70 m)		Later Top 15 semifinalist at Miss Missouri USA 2020
Illinois	Olivia Bohleber	17	Carmi	5 ft 7 in (1.70 m)		
Indiana	Paige Robinson	18	Indianapolis		3rd runner-up	
Iowa	Carley Arnold	19	Chariton	5 ft 10 in (1.78 m)	Top 15	
Kansas	Malerie Moore	17	Olathe	5 ft 6 in (1.68 m)		Sister of Madison Moore, Miss Kansas Teen USA 2016
Kentucky	Olivia Prewitt	18	Danville	5 ft 2 in (1.57 m)		
Louisiana	Hailey Crausby	18	Lacombe			
Maine	Victoria Timm	18	Scarborough	5 ft 7 in (1.70 m)		
Maryland	Taylor Spruill	19	Upper Marlboro	5 ft 9 in (1.75 m)	Top 15	
Massachusetts	Caitlyn Martin	17	Swansea	5 ft 6 in (1.68 m)		
Michigan	Kenzie Weingartz	18	Marysville			
Minnesota	Tori Trittin	15	Lakeville	5 ft 4 in (1.63 m)		Later Miss Wisconsin USA 2024
Mississippi	Hannah Chisolm	17	Collinsville	5 ft 7 in (1.70 m)		
Missouri	Sophia Dominguez-Heithoff	17	Kansas City	5 ft 10 in (1.78 m)	Miss Teen USA 2017	
Montana	Elle Cook	18	Billings	5 ft 8 in (1.73 m)		Later 1st runner-up at Miss Montana USA 2019
Nebraska	Samantha Washington	19	Lincoln	5 ft 8 in (1.73 m)		Daughter of former American Football player, Brian Washington; Previously Miss Nebraska's Outstanding Teen 2013; Later 2nd runner-up at Miss Nebraska USA 2019; Later 2nd runner-up at Miss Nebraska USA 2020; Later contestant on season 28 of The Bachelor
Nevada	Alexis Smith	17	Las Vegas	5 ft 10 in (1.78 m)	2nd runner-up	
New Hampshire	Kolby Tracey	18	Bedford	5 ft 8 in (1.73 m)		
New Jersey	Briahna Reinstein	17	Manalapan	5 ft 1 in (1.55 m)		
New Mexico	Kalina Hamilton	17	Albuquerque	5 ft 9 in (1.75 m)		
New York	Isabella Griffith	16	Melville	5 ft 10 in (1.78 m)	Top 15	
North Carolina	Kenzie Hansley	18	Surf City	5 ft 10 in (1.78 m)		Previously Miss North Carolina's Outstanding Teen 2015
North Dakota	Kilyn Parisien-Hill	19	Belcourt	5 ft 5 in (1.65 m)		
Ohio	Emma Karle	18	Springfield Township			
Oklahoma	Baylee Ogle	18	Norman	5 ft 7 in (1.70 m)	Top 15	Later 3rd runner-up at Miss Oklahoma USA 2019
Oregon	Vanessa Matheson	19	Klamath Falls	5 ft 9 in (1.75 m)	1st runner-up	
Pennsylvania	Lauren Weaver	17	Windber	5 ft 9 in (1.75 m)		
Rhode Island	Alexa Papigiotis	18	North Providence	5 ft 2 in (1.57 m)		Later 3rd runner-up at Miss Rhode Island USA 2019; Later 2nd runner-up at Miss Rhode Island USA 2020
South Carolina	Alexis Johnson	18	Myrtle Beach	5 ft 10 in (1.78 m)		
South Dakota	Delaney Rupp	19	Sioux Falls	5 ft 11 in (1.80 m)		Sister of Alexis Rupp, Miss South Dakota Teen USA 2013
Tennessee	Megan Ski Hollingsworth	18	Lewisburg			Later 2nd runner-up at Miss Tennessee USA 2019
Texas	Kirby Lindley	19	Cypress	5 ft 9 in (1.75 m)	Top 15	Later 1st runner-up at Miss Texas USA 2019
Utah	Rachel Bell	18	Sandy		Top 15	Sister of Kendyl Bell, Miss Utah USA 2012
Vermont	Kelsey Golonka	18	Montpelier	5 ft 4 in (1.63 m)	Top 15	Later Miss Vermont USA 2022; Sister of Kenzie Golonka, Miss Vermont Teen USA 2022
Virginia	Madison Walker	17	Virginia Beach			
Washington	Alyssa Williams	18	Sumner	5 ft 7 in (1.70 m)		
West Virginia	Olivia Hutchison	18	Huntington	5 ft 9 in (1.75 m)	Top 15	
Wisconsin	Abby Bryson	19	Brookfield	5 ft 8 in (1.73 m)		Sister of Elizabeth Bryson, Miss Wisconsin Teen USA 2009
Wyoming	Autumn Schieferstein	17	Cheyenne	5 ft 8 in (1.73 m)	Top 15	
