= President's Quality Award =

The Presidential Award for Management Excellence—the President’s Quality Award (PQA)—is the highest award given to Executive Branch agencies for management excellence. The award was established in 1988 to recognize excellence in quality and productivity, applying to the public sector similar criteria used for the Malcolm Baldrige National Quality Award.

In 2002, the PQA was redesigned to recognize Federal agencies that best achieve the objectives of the President’s Management Agenda (PMA).

In 2009, the PQA program ceased operation.

== See also ==
- Baldrige Award
- Total Quality Management
