= Park Hill High School =

Location
- 7701 NW Barry Road; Kansas City, Platte County, Missouri 64152; United States; 39°14′44″N 94°40′10″W

Information
- School district: Park Hill School District
- Principal: James Bradford Kincheloe
- Teaching staff: 109.69 (FTE)
- Grades: 9-12
- Enrollment: 1,936 (2023-2024)
- Student to teacher ratio: 17.65
- Language: English (may be subject to others)
- Campus type: suburban
- Colors: Red and white
- Mascot: Trojan
- Rival: Park Hill South Panthers; Liberty Blue Jays; Liberty North Eagles
- Budget: $108,339,420 (District)
- Revenue: $105,649,420 (District)
- Website: https://phhs.parkhill.k12.mo.us/

Park Hill High School is one of two high schools in the Park Hill School District, in Kansas City. The school is located in northern Kansas City, in Platte County.

Park Hill's teams are called the Trojans, and its colors are scarlet and white. Park Hill High School had an enrollment of 1,857 students in 2022–2023.

In addition to portions of Kansas City, the school's attendance boundary includes Lake Waukomis, Platte Woods, and Weatherby Lake.

== History ==
The original school building opened in 1952 and the current building opened in 1967. The original building became Park Hill Junior High and later Plaza Middle School, the district's 6th grade school. Plaza is now a 6-8 grade middle school.

In the late 1990s a new gymnasium was built on the west side of the building to replace the original gym, which is now used primarily for practices and school dances. Around this same time, an auditorium was also built adjacent to the new gym.

Prior to the opening of Park Hill South High School in 1998, Park Hill HS had been housed in two buildings. One of them was converted into Congress Middle School after Park Hill South opened. All 12th graders, in 1998, remained at Park Hill High, while other grades were divided between the two high schools.

Since 1998, Park Hill has won nine wrestling state championships, two volleyball state championships, and the 2003 football state championship, as well as a cheerleading state championship in 2014. The Lady Trojans won the 2018 girls soccer state championship.

== Facilities ==
The school has a football complex, gymnasium, and auditorium. The Park Hill Aquatic Center is located next to the football complex. It houses the Park Hill and Park Hill South boys' and girls' swim teams.

Notably, students at both Park Hill and Park Hill South High Schools have the option to attend Lead Innovation Studio a high school program, located in Line Creek.

In the original 1952 facility, the library was in two classrooms that were redone into a library.

== Notable alumni ==
- Aaron Ashby (class of 2016), MLB baseball player
- Andy Ashby, MLB baseball player
- Ronnie Bell (class of 2018), NFL football player for the Detroit Lions
- Johnny Eblen (class of 2010), mixed martial artist currently signed to Bellator MMA; 8th Bellator Middleweight Champion
- Carter Jensen (class of 2021), MLB baseball player for the Kansas City Royals
- Raymond Lee (class of 2011), USL soccer player, Pittsburgh Riverhounds SC; MASL soccer player, Kansas City Comets
- Chris Nilsen (class of 2016), 6x NCAA Division I First Team All-American, and a 3x NCAA Track and field pole vault champion, silver medal at the 2020 Summer Olympics
- Wes Scantlin (class of 1990), musician and lead vocalist/rhythm guitarist of the Kansas City-born band Puddle of Mudd
- Landry Shamet (class of 2015), NBA player, (New York Knicks)
- Jenna Winebrenner (class of 2017), NWSL soccer player for the Kansas City Current and North Carolina Courage, first female MASL coach for the Kansas City Comets
