= Weatherby Lake, Missouri =

City in Missouri, U.S.

- City
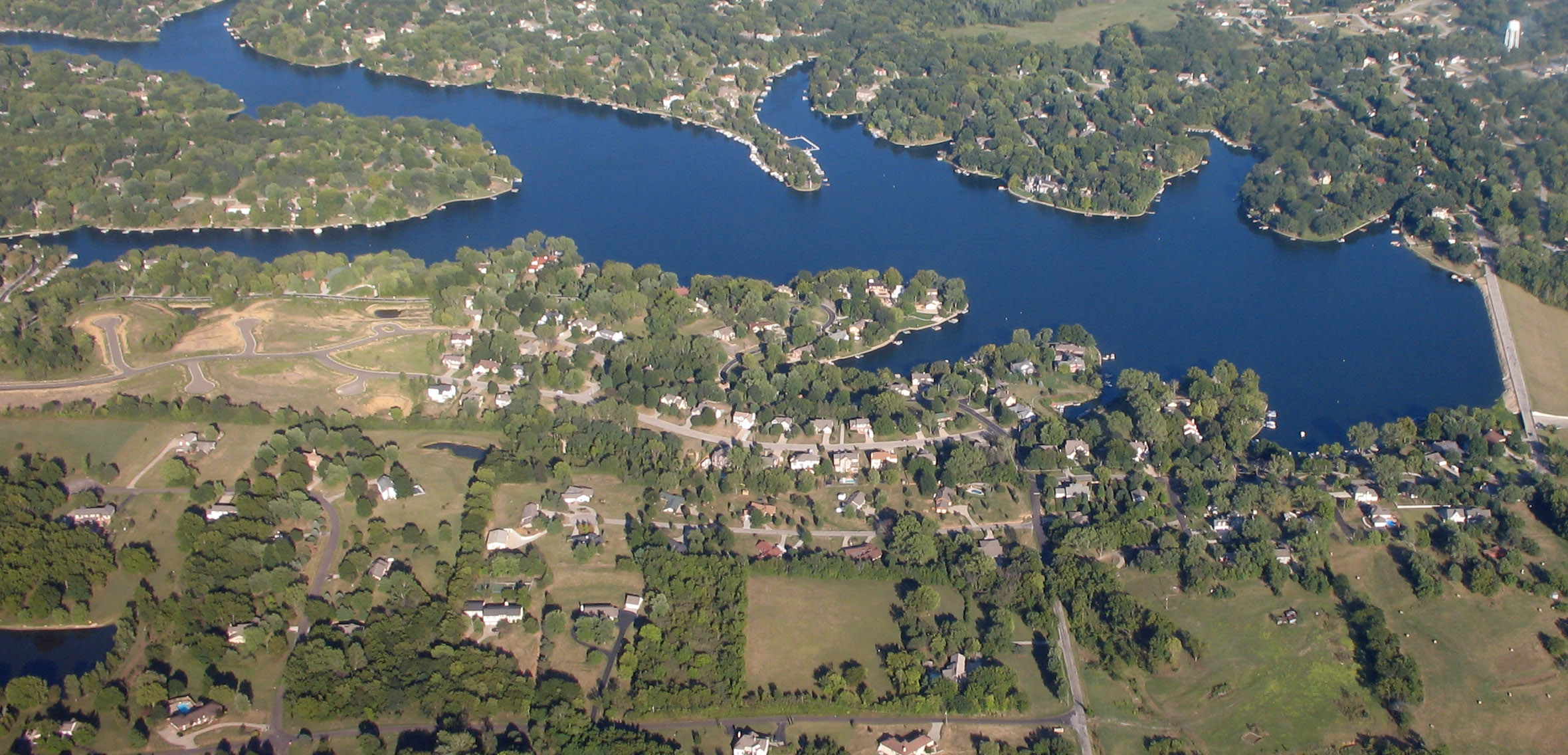
- Weatherby Lake from the west

- Location of Weatherby Lake, Missouri
- Coordinates: 39°14′12″N 94°41′45″W
- Country: United States
- State: Missouri
- County: Platte
- Township: Carroll

Area
  - Total: 1.34 sq mi (3.47 km^{2})
  - Land: 1.03 sq mi (2.66 km^{2})
  - Water: 0.31 sq mi (0.80 km^{2})
- Elevation: 896 ft (273 m)

Population (2020)
  - Total: 2,077
  - Density: 2,018.8/sq mi (779.46/km^{2})
- Time zone: UTC-6 (Central (CST))
  - Summer (DST): UTC-5 (CDT)
- ZIP codes: 64152-64153
- Area code: 816
- FIPS code: 29-78046
- GNIS feature ID: 2397236
- Website: cityofweatherbylake-mo.gov

Weatherby Lake is a city in Platte County, Missouri and is part of the Kansas City metropolitan area within the United States, which borders Kansas City. The population was 2,077 as of the 2020 census.

== Geography ==
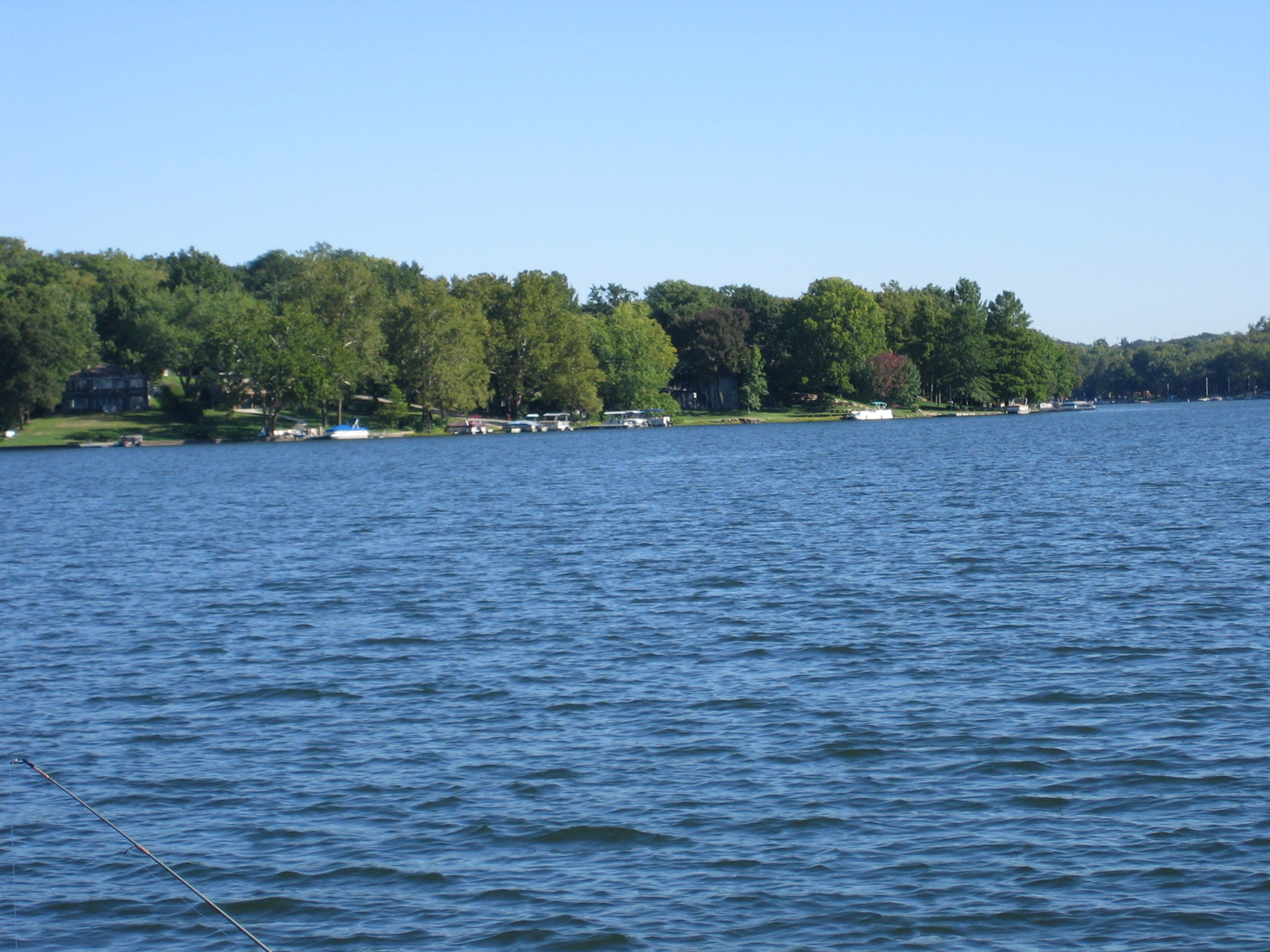
Weatherby Lake

According to the United States Census Bureau, the city has a total area of 1.34 square miles (3.47 km^{2}), of which 1.03 square miles (2.67 km^{2}) is land and 0.31 square miles (0.80 km^{2}) is water.

The city is named after Glenn Weatherby, who along with other developers built what was then known as the Lakeview Subdivision. A 274 acre lake, also named Weatherby Lake, was created by the construction of a dam completed in 1937. The town encompasses the lake.

== Demographics ==
Historical population
Census	Pop.	Note	%±
1960	376		—
1970	832		121.3%
1980	1,446		73.8%
1990	1,613		11.5%
2000	1,873		16.1%
2010	1,723		−8.0%
2020	2,077		20.5%
U.S. Decennial Census

=== 2020 census ===
As of the 2020 census, Weatherby Lake had a population of 2,077. The median age was 49.5 years. 21.0% of residents were under the age of 18 and 25.6% of residents were 65 years of age or older. For every 100 females there were 99.5 males, and for every 100 females age 18 and over there were 95.4 males age 18 and over.

100.0% of residents lived in urban areas, while 0.0% lived in rural areas.

There were 808 households in Weatherby Lake, of which 31.7% had children under the age of 18 living in them. Of all households, 73.9% were married-couple households, 8.2% were households with a male householder and no spouse or partner present, and 14.0% were households with a female householder and no spouse or partner present. About 15.8% of all households were made up of individuals and 9.8% had someone living alone who was 65 years of age or older.

There were 830 housing units, of which 2.7% were vacant. The homeowner vacancy rate was 0.9% and the rental vacancy rate was 0.0%.

Racial composition as of the 2020 census
Race	Number	Percent
White	1,841	88.6%
Black or African American	17	0.8%
American Indian and Alaska Native	5	0.2%
Asian	36	1.7%
Native Hawaiian and Other Pacific Islander	6	0.3%
Some other race	19	0.9%
Two or more races	153	7.4%
Hispanic or Latino (of any race)	75	3.6%

=== 2010 census ===
As of the census of 2010, there were 1,723 people, 699 households, and 564 families living in the city. The population density was 1,672.8 inhabitants per square mile (645.9/km^{2}). There were 732 housing units at an average density of 710.7 per square mile (274.4/km^{2}). The racial makeup of the city was 95.1% White, 0.8% African American, 0.5% Native American, 1.5% Asian, 0.1% Pacific Islander, 0.7% from other races, and 1.4% from two or more races. Hispanic or Latino of any race were 3.2% of the population.

There were 699 households, of which 25.9% had children under the age of 18 living with them, 73.0% were married couples living together, 5.4% had a female householder with no husband present, 2.3% had a male householder with no wife present, and 19.3% were non-families. 16.7% of all households were made up of individuals, and 6.5% had someone living alone who was 65 years of age or older. The average household size was 2.45 and the average family size was 2.73.

The median age in the city was 52.7 years. 18.7% of residents were under the age of 18; 4.1% were between the ages of 18 and 24; 14.2% were from 25 to 44; 40.8% were from 45 to 64; and 22.2% were 65 years of age or older. The gender makeup of the city was 49.0% male and 51.0% female.

=== 2000 census ===
As of the census of 2000, there were 1,873 people, 700 households, and 588 families living in the city. The population density was 1,810.5 inhabitants per square mile (699.0/km^{2}). There were 722 housing units at an average density of 697.9 per square mile (269.5/km^{2}). The racial makeup of the city was 96.64% White, 1.07% African American, 0.32% Native American, 0.91% Asian, 0.16% from other races, and 0.91% from two or more races. Hispanic or Latino of any race were 1.66% of the population.

There were 700 households, out of which 32.7% had children under the age of 18 living with them, 78.9% were married couples living together, 3.1% had a female householder with no husband present, and 15.9% were non-families. 12.7% of all households were made up of individuals, and 2.4% had someone living alone who was 65 years of age or older. The average household size was 2.67 and the average family size was 2.88.

In the city, the population was spread out, with 23.0% under the age of 18, 5.7% from 18 to 24, 20.1% from 25 to 44, 41.4% from 45 to 64, and 9.9% who were 65 years of age or older. The median age was 46 years. For every 100 females, there were 101.4 males. For every 100 females age 18 and over, there were 100.4 males.

The median income for a household in the city was $88,030, and the median income for a family was $94,643. Males had a median income of $61,042 versus $37,386 for females. The per capita income for the city was $37,722. About 0.7% of families and 1.5% of the population were below the poverty line, including 2.7% of those under age 18 and none of those age 65 or over.

== Education ==
It is in the Park Hill School District. It is zoned to Hawthorn Elementary School, Congress Middle School, and Park Hill High School.

Metropolitan Community College has the Park Hill school district in its taxation area.

== See also ==
- List of cities in Missouri
