= Melana Scantlin =

American beauty pageant winner and journalist (born 1977)

- Born: December 4, 1977 (age 48); Gladstone, Missouri, U.S.
- Height: 5 ft 3 in (1.60 m)
- Beauty pageant titleholder
- Title: Miss Missouri USA 2002
- Hair color: Blond
- Eye color: Green
- Major competitions: Miss Teen USA 1995, Miss Missouri USA 2002, Miss USA 2002

Melana Scantlin (born December 4, 1977) is an American entertainment journalist, sports journalist and former Miss Missouri USA, and reality television star who also competed in the Miss Teen USA and Miss USA pageants. In college, she was named to the Dean's List, The National Dean's List and Who's Who Among College and University Students.

Scantlin's first beauty pageant win was Miss Missouri Teen USA. She went on to represent Missouri in the Miss Teen USA pageant broadcast and placed in the semifinals.

In 2001, she won the Miss Missouri USA 2002 title, becoming the fifth former Miss Teen USA delegate to win the title. She went on to represent Missouri in the Miss USA 2002 pageant broadcast live from Gary, Indiana on March 2, 2002.

Scantlin became widely known in 2003 on the first season of the TV series Average Joe. She was expecting to start off meeting a bunch of hunks, but was instead inundated with mostly plain-looking and/or obese suitors. Later on in the show, three model types of men were brought in to compete against the Average Joes. She chose "pretty boy" Jason Peoples over Average Joe Adam Mesh. After the show, Melana and Jason flew off in a private jet for a romantic getaway. The two made the rounds of TV talk shows, but later started seeing other people.

She has served as an on-camera host and red carpet interviewer for E!, NBC Universal, Variety, VH1, Yahoo, Verizon, Best Damn Sports Show Period, The Kanas City Chiefs, The New England Patriots, Mercedes-Benz Fashion Week, NFL Kick-off Week, NHL All-Star Week, The Super Bowl, The Oscars, The Emmys, The Grammys, MTV VMAs, CMT Music Awards, AFI Lifetime Achievement Awards, The ESPYs, ION, FX, Verifone, Screenvision, World Series of Blackjack, Red Carpet Specials and Live Panel Discussions'. She's also appeared on Days of Our Lives, 20 Most Awesomely Bad Songs on VH1, Sidewalks Entertainment, The Wayne Brady Show, The Tonight Show with Jay Leno, and Live with Regis and Kelly.

In 2004, Scantlin was the co-host of the Screening Room, a movie review segment which airs Fridays on WDAF-TV in Kansas City, Missouri.

Scantlin graduated from Park University in Parkville, Missouri, where she was on the Dean's List, named to the National Dean's List and Who's Who Among College and University Students.

She resides in Los Angeles, California where she hosts E! News Now since 2009.

== Other ==
She is also the cousin of lead singer Wes Scantlin from Puddle of Mudd.

Preceded by Larissa Meek	Miss Missouri USA; 2002	Succeeded by Tara Bollinger
