= Northmoor, Missouri =

City in Platte County, Missouri, United States

- City
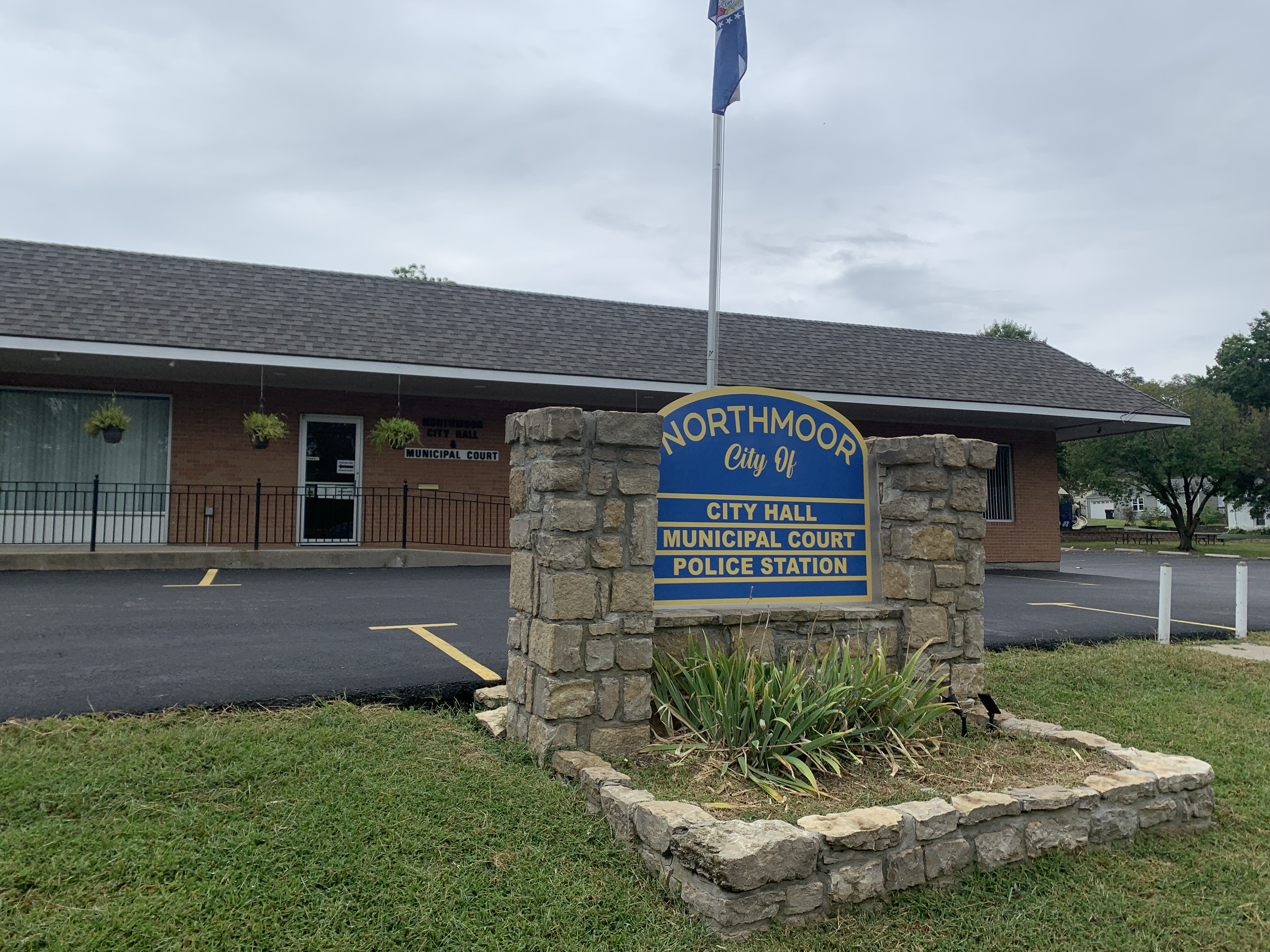
- Northmoor city hall

- Location of Northmoor, Missouri
- Coordinates: 39°11′04″N 94°36′20″W
- Country: United States
- State: Missouri
- County: Platte
- Township: Pettis

Area
  - Total: 0.24 sq mi (0.61 km^{2})
  - Land: 0.24 sq mi (0.61 km^{2})
  - Water: 0 sq mi (0.00 km^{2})
- Elevation: 784 ft (239 m)

Population (2020)
  - Total: 291
  - Density: 1,231.6/sq mi (475.51/km^{2})
- Time zone: UTC-6 (Central (CST))
  - Summer (DST): UTC-5 (CDT)
- ZIP code: 64151
- Area codes: 816 and 975
- FIPS code: 29-53174
- GNIS feature ID: 2395267
- Website: northmoormo.gov

Northmoor is a city in Platte County, Missouri, and is part of the Kansas City metropolitan area. The population was 291 at the 2020 census.

== History ==
A post office called Northmoor was established in 1927, and remained in operation until 1947. The community's name is an amalgamation of Moore, the name of a first settler, and "north", a directional name relative to the community's location from Kansas City.

On May 4, 2003 an F4 tornado ripped through the town, destroying several homes and causing extensive damage to the police station and to City Hall. Despite the damage, no serious injuries were reported.

== Geography ==
According to the United States Census Bureau, the city has a total area of 0.24 square miles (0.62 km^{2}), all land.

Northmoor is bounded by city of Riverside on the south and west, and the Kansas City neighborhoods of Lakeview Terrace and Briarcliff West, to the north and east, respectively.

== Demographics ==
Historical population
Census	Pop.	Note	%±
1960	696		—
1970	562		−19.3%
1980	506		−10.0%
1990	441		−12.8%
2000	399		−9.5%
2010	325		−18.5%
2020	291		−10.5%
U.S. Decennial Census

=== 2010 census ===
As of the census of 2010, there were 325 people, 134 households, and 82 families living in the city. The population density was 1,354.2 inhabitants per square mile (522.9/km^{2}). There were 159 housing units at an average density of 662.5 per square mile (255.8/km^{2}). The racial makeup of the city was 96.0% White, 3.4% African American, 0.3% Native American, and 0.3% Pacific Islander. Hispanic or Latino of any race were 1.2% of the population.

There were 134 households, of which 28.4% had children under the age of 18 living with them, 38.1% were married couples living together, 15.7% had a female householder with no husband present, 7.5% had a male householder with no wife present, and 38.8% were non-families. 27.6% of all households were made up of individuals, and 7.5% had someone living alone who was 65 years of age or older. The average household size was 2.34 and the average family size was 2.77.

The median age in the city was 42.4 years. 16.6% of residents were under the age of 18; 9.3% were between the ages of 18 and 24; 29.9% were from 25 to 44; 33.8% were from 45 to 64; and 10.5% were 65 years of age or older. The gender makeup of the city was 53.2% male and 46.8% female.

=== 2000 census ===
The census of 2000 recorded 399 people, 171 households, and 108 families living in the city. The population density was 1,663.8 inhabitants per square mile (642.4/km^{2}). There were 182 housing units at an average density of 758.9 per square mile (293.0/km^{2}). The racial makeup of the city was 93.23% White, 0.75% African American, 1.25% Native American, 1.50% Asian, 0.50% from other races, and 2.76% from two or more races. Hispanic or Latino of any race were 3.26% of the population.

Of the 171 households, 29.8% had children under the age of 18 living with them, 40.9% consisted of married couples living together, 17.5% had a female householder with no husband present, and 36.8% were non-families. 30.4% of all households were made up of individuals, and 9.9% had someone living alone who was 65 years of age or older. The average household size was 2.33 and the average family size was 2.77.

In the city the population was spread out, with 25.3% under the age of 18, 6.5% from 18 to 24, 34.6% from 25 to 44, 19.5% from 45 to 64, and 14.0% who were 65 years of age or older. The median age was 35 years. For every 100 females, there were 101.5 males. For every 100 females age 18 and over, there were 97.4 males.

The median income for a household in the city was $27,250, and the median income for a family was $31,806. Males had a median income of $28,125 versus $19,306 for females. The per-capita income for the city was $14,263. About 13.4% of families and 13.5% of the population were below the poverty line, including 9.2% of those under age 18 and 21.3% of those age 65 or over.

== Education ==
It is in the Park Hill School District. Much of it is zoned to Line Creek Elementary School and Walden Middle School, while a portion is zoned to English Landing Elementary School and Lake View Middle School. All residents are zoned to Park Hill South High School.

Metropolitan Community College has the Park Hill school district in its taxation area.

== See also ==
- List of cities in Missouri
