= The Partnership for Excellence =

- Founded: 1998
- Type: 501c(3)
- Location: Columbus, Ohio
- Region served: Ohio, Indiana, and West Virginia
- Product: Administers Baldrige Assessments to organizations throughout the states served.
- Key people: Margot Hoffman, CEO
- Website: thepartnershipforexcellence.org
- Formerly called: Ohio Partnership for Excellence

The Partnership for Excellence (formerly the Ohio Partnership for Excellence) is a nonprofit organization that administers a state-level award program for performance excellence in Ohio, Indiana, and West Virginia.

== History ==
The Ohio Partnership for Excellence was incorporated as a 501c(3) nonprofit organization in 1998 to provide state level Baldrige assessment services and resources for interested organizations. In 2011, it was renamed The Partnership for Excellence (TPE) to reflect regional expansion that includes the states of Indiana and West Virginia.

The first award cycle was completed in 1999-2000.

The first Executive Director of the Ohio Partnership for Excellence was Tom Casperson (1998 – 2001), followed by Michael DiMonte (2001), Casey Mackert (2003 – 2006), Boris Slogar (2007 – 2008), and Dr. Elaine Edgar (2008 – 2011).

In 2011, Colonel Alfred C. Faber, Jr. was appointed to the position of President/CEO of The Partnership for Excellence. Dr. Margot Hoffman took on the role of President/CEO in 2014.

== Relationship with the Baldrige Community ==
- TPE is a member of a national network of state and local Baldrige-based awards programs.
- TPE Awards are based on the most recent Criteria for Performance Excellence – updated by the Baldrige Performance Excellence Program every two years.
- Starting in 2012, unless certain conditions are met, organizations from Ohio, Indiana, and West Virginia are eligible to apply for the Malcolm Baldrige National Quality Award only if they have been awarded TPE's Governor's Award of Excellence in the previous five years.

== Membership ==
TPE is a membership organization composed of interested individuals and organizations throughout Ohio, Indiana, and West Virginia. TPE collects annual membership dues for the January to December membership year.

== Board of Examiners ==
TPE's Board of Examiners is composed of volunteer individuals who successfully complete annual training. Advisors and examiners used during the awards process are drawn from the Board of Examiners.

== Product/Service ==
TPE’s main product is a feedback report to the partnering organizations that successfully complete the award process. The report contains strengths as well as opportunities for improvement (OFI) derived from both the submitted application and a site visit. This is a distinct difference from the national Baldrige Award process where only organizations with highly graded applications are granted a site visit.

TPE also provides Baldrige-related educational services such as conferences, seminars, and direct partnering with individuals and organizations.

== TPE Awards Process ==
TPE provides three options for organizations wanting to improve their organizational performance:

=== Advising ===
This is the level for organizations that are new to the Baldrige program and just getting started. A professional coach works with the organization to further explain the Baldrige Excellence Framework and develop a 5-page Organizational Profile. Once completed, TPE Examiners provide a feedback report, which includes a list of strengths and opportunities for improvement. Successful completion of the Advising level results in the “Spirit” award recognition at TPE’s annual Quest for Success Conference.

=== Partnering ===
This is Part II of the Advising & Partnering program. The professional coach reviews the feedback for the Organizational Profile and assists the organization in interpreting the feedback including linking the Organizational Profile to the process categories and aligning to the Baldrige Criteria, and developing a timeline for the organization to develop a 25-page application addressing the Baldrige Excellence Builder criteria. The Partnering phase focuses on processes, systems, and associated results. After review of this application, TPE Examiners provide a feedback report, which includes a list of strengths and opportunities for improvement. Successful completion of the Partnering level results in the “Pioneer” award recognition at TPE’s Quest for Success Conference.

=== Examining ===
This is the traditional 50-page application assessment mirroring the Malcolm Baldrige National Quality Award's assessment cycle. Organizations participating in this option submit an Intent to Apply in August before the application due date in December each year. TPE assigns a team of 6-8 members from the Board of Examiners to review (independently and then by consensus) the application before a 3-day site visit is conducted. TPE then provides the organization with a feedback report, which includes a list of strength and opportunities for improvement. Based on the recommendations of the examiners team, TPE's Board of Trustees recognizes each organization with a Bronze, Silver, Gold, or Platinum Award at the annual Quest for Success conference.

- Platinum Level - Also called the Governor's Award for Excellence
- Gold Level - Also called the Achievement of Excellence Award
- Silver Level - Also called the Commitment to Excellence Award
- Bronze Level - Also called the Pledge to Excellence Award
- Category Lead Performer Award
- In 2007, TPE also recognized two organizations with the Executive Director's Special Distinction award.

== Past Platinum Level - Governor's Award for Excellence Award Recipients ==
Note:

- The Partnership for Excellence does not necessarily recognize an organization at the Platinum level every year. Awards may have been given at the Gold, Silver, or Bronze Levels only (not listed here).

Year	Recipient
2021	Hendricks Regional Health (Danville, IN)
	ProMedica Health System (Toledo, OH)
2020	**not awarded**
2019	Blanchard Valley Health System (Findlay, OH)
2018	Managed Healthcare Services (a division of Lilly USA, LLC – Indianapolis, IN)
	ProMedica Memorial Hospital (Fremont, OH)
2017	University Hospitals Geauga Medical Center (Chardon, OH)
2016	Memorial Hospital and Health Care Center (Jasper, IN)
	Six Disciplines Consulting Services (Findlay, OH)
2015	**not awarded**
2014	Charleston Area Medical Center (Charleston, WV)
2013	Citizens Energy Group (Indianapolis, IN)
	Union Hospital (Terre Haute, IN)
2012	Citizens Energy Group (Indianapolis, IN)
	ProMedica Flower Hospital (Sylvania, OH)
2011	Eaton North American Financial Services Center (Brook Park, OH)
2010	Kettering Health Network (Kettering, OH)
2009	**not awarded**
2008	**not awarded**
2007	**not awarded**
2006	Riverside Methodist Hospital (Columbus, OH)
2005	Ohio Department of Transportation District 10 (Marrietta, OH)
	Ohio Department of Transportation District 12 (Garfield Heights, OH)
2004	Dana Corporation - Spicer Outdoor Power Equipment Components Division (Fredericktown, OH)
	PRO-TEC Coating Company (Leipsic, OH)
2003	University of Cincinnati - Administrative and Business Services Division
2002	Eaton Corporation - Van Wert Division
	Southern Ohio Medical Center (Portsmouth, OH)
2001	American Electric Power (Conesville, OH)
	Van Dorn Demag Corporation (Strongsville, OH)
2000	**not awarded**

== See also ==
- Malcolm Baldrige National Quality Award
