= Excellence in Missouri Foundation =

The Excellence in Missouri Foundation was established in 1992 to administer the Missouri Quality Award program and to promote quality principles in business, education, government and health care throughout Missouri. Based in Jefferson City, Missouri, it is a 501 (c)(3) not-for-profit educational organization funded entirely by contributions from the private sector and income-generating activities. The Foundation is led by a Board of Directors, chaired by Dennis DeGroodt, and is composed of key business, education, government, and health care leaders from across the state.

The foundation provides a variety of services to assist businesses in achieving excellence in all areas of the Baldrige Criteria for Performance Excellence (leadership, customer focus, and process management among others) including seminars to teach concepts, such as balanced scorecards and also lessons in strategic planning. Businesses who have taken advantage of the foundation have greatly benefited and the results show financially as well as increasing overall productivity.

To date, the Foundation has distributed over 38,000 copies of the Award Criteria, certified over 1,400 men and women as MQA Examiners, presented 51 organizations, 28 teams, and 19 individuals with Awards, and educated over 11,000 people through public offerings. In its 16th year, the Foundation anticipates much continued success.

== Missouri Quality Award ==
The Excellence in Missouri Foundation offers the official state recognition for excellence in quality leadership known as the Missouri Quality Award.

Modeled after the Malcolm Baldrige National Quality Award, the Excellence in Missouri Foundation's program offers an educational process through which Missouri companies can learn and implement quality techniques and assessment tactics.

Any organization located in Missouri is allowed to participate in the Missouri Quality Award program, however there are separate awards for education, health care, service, public sector, and manufacturing and are divided into small, medium, and large company categories.

=== Missouri Quality Process ===
The application package consists of three parts:

- An Eligibility Determination Form showing that eligibility has been approved
- A completed Application Form
- An application report consisting of a Business Overview and responses to the Award Criteria

Each application is reviewed by the volunteer Board of Examiners with special attention taken to prevent conflict of interest. After the application is reviewed the Excellence in Missouri foundation provides feedback reports aimed at helping the company further improve.

== Past Missouri Quality Award winners ==
2009:

- Concordia Publishing House (St. Louis)
- Park Hill School District (Kansas City)
- St. Mary's Health Center (Jefferson City)

2008

- Northwest Missouri State University (Maryville)
- Federal Reserve Bank of St. Louis
- MidwayUSA (Columbia)
- SSM Integrated Health Technologies (St. Louis)
- SSM St. Francis Hospital and Health Services (Maryville)

2007:

- Missouri Department of Transportation (Jefferson City)
- Honeywell FM&T (Kansas City)
