= Friends of NRA =

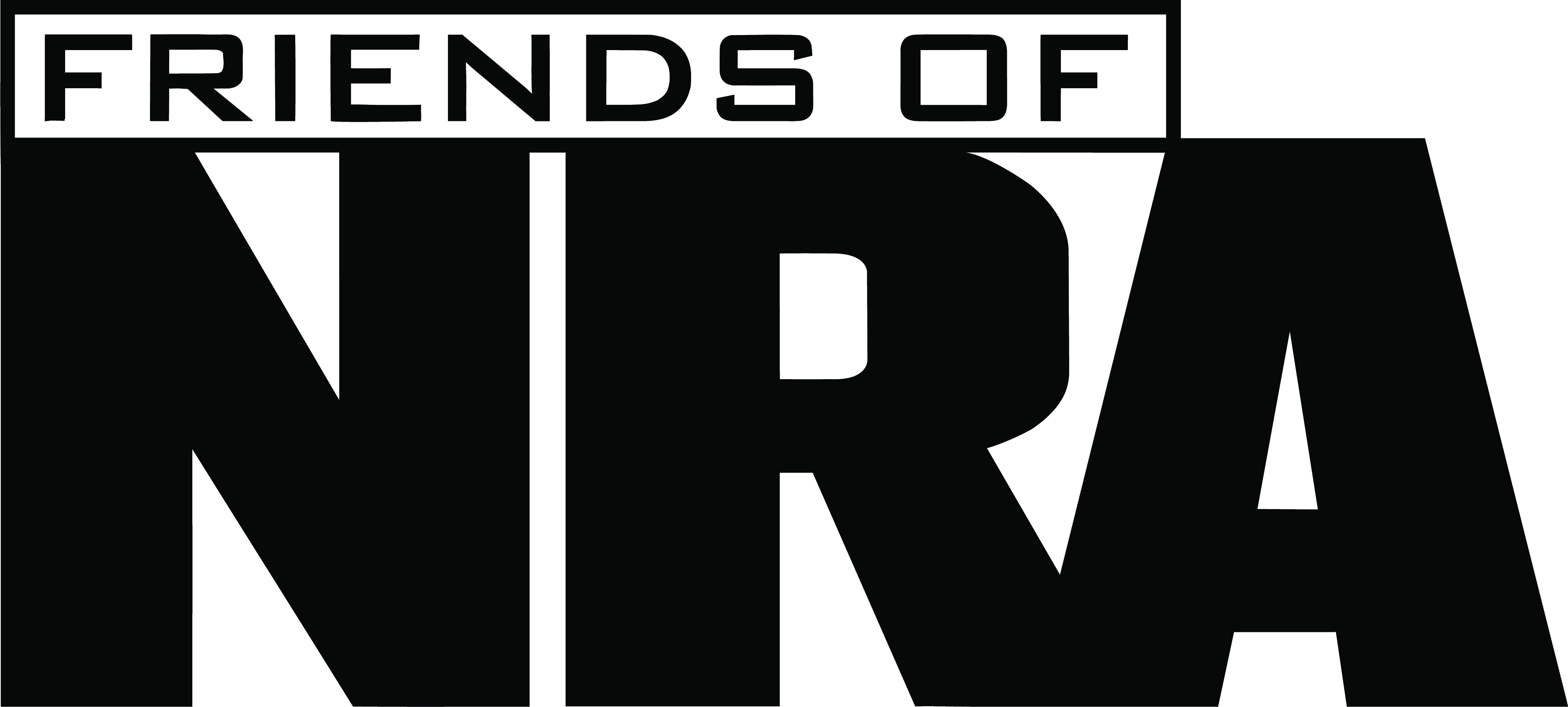
- Founded: 1992
- Purpose: Fund raising
- Location: Headquarters in Fairfax, VA
- Region served: United States
- Revenue: $815 million since inception
- Website: http://www.friendsofnra.org/

Friends of NRA is a program of the NRA Foundation, a non-political 501(c)(3) charity. It is a fund-raising program associated with the National Rifle Association of America. Funds are raised across America, primarily during approximately 1100 annual events. Each event occurs in a different community and is volunteer-run and managed at the local level with NRA support staff oversight.

Since its inception in 1992, Friends of NRA has held over 17,600 events, reached over 3.2 million attendees and raised over $815 million for The NRA Foundation.

A typical Friends of NRA event starts with a reception that includes games, raffles and a silent auction. Attendees eat dinner and listen to a guest speaker, if one is present. The evening concludes with a live auction and winners are chosen from the games, raffles and silent auction.

The organization has been criticized by gun control activists and some parents for conducting gun auctions in schools, sometimes involving bringing actual weapons onto school grounds. After school shootings in recent years, many schools have students perform active shooter drills in case of a mass shooting.
