= Riverside, Missouri =

City in Platte County, Missouri, United States

- City
- Location of Riverside, Missouri

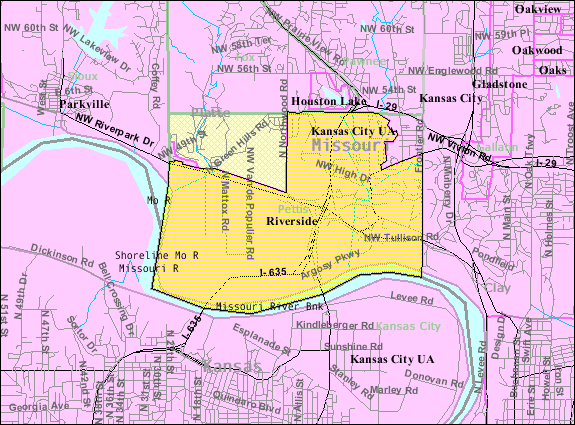
- Coordinates: 39°10′13″N 94°37′50″W
- Country: United States
- State: Missouri
- County: Platte
- Established: 1951

Area
  - Total: 5.80 sq mi (15.03 km^{2})
  - Land: 5.53 sq mi (14.32 km^{2})
  - Water: 0.27 sq mi (0.71 km^{2})
- Elevation: 751 ft (229 m)

Population (2020)
  - Total: 4,013
  - Density: 726.0/sq mi (280.32/km^{2})
- Time zone: UTC-6 (Central (CST))
  - Summer (DST): UTC-5 (CDT)
- ZIP codes: 64150, 64151, 64168
- Area code: 816
- FIPS code: 29-62156
- GNIS feature ID: 2396385
- Website: www.riversidemo.gov

Riverside is a city in Platte County, Missouri, United States, that is part of the Kansas City metropolitan area. The population was 4,013 at the 2020 census.

== History ==
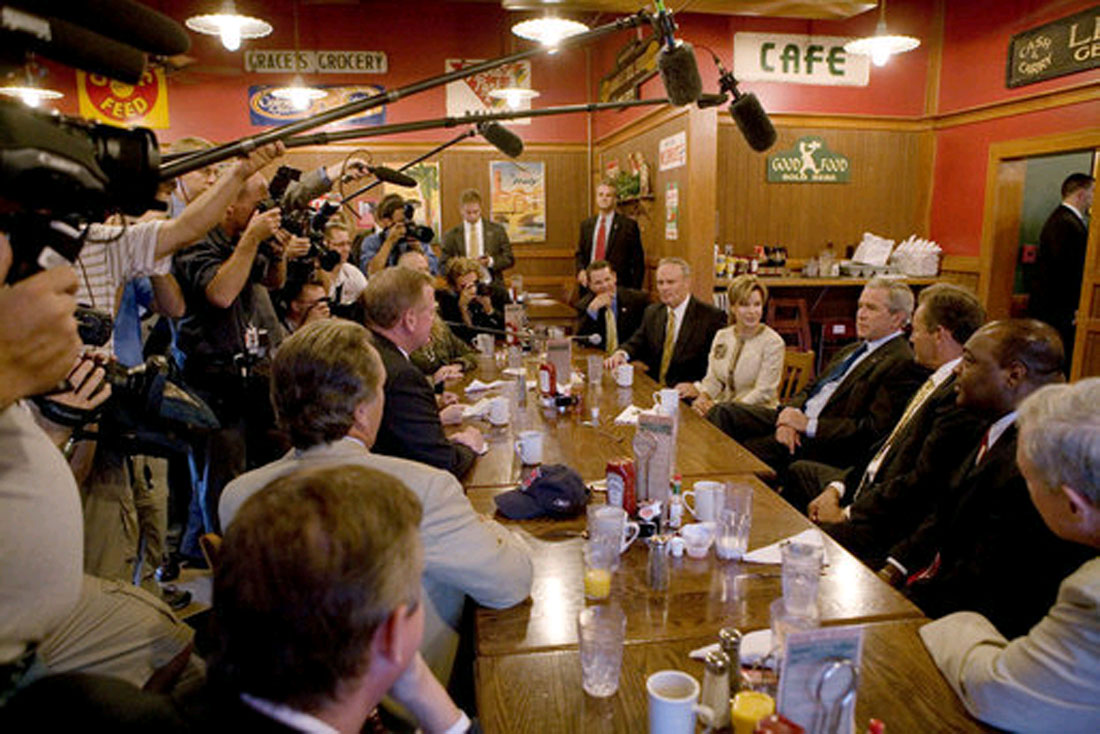
George W. Bush visited the Corner Cafe in August 2007.

Riverside lies on the edge of the Missouri River and was formally incorporated in 1951.

For many years, the town was known for its Riverside Race Track. The Riverside Park Jockey Club operated from 1928 to 1937 and was popularly called Pendergast Track after its patron, the city boss of Kansas City, Tom Pendergast, although he was not officially on its organization papers. The horse racing track was on the site of a former dog racing track. The track operated under a questionable legal basis. The site was supplanted by an automobile race track, which closed in the 1990s.

The Argosy Gaming Company has a casino along the river.

The Riverside Red X store was founded as a gas station in 1948 by Edward Young. He and local business owners Ferd Filger and Dr. Thomas M. Eagle led the incorporation of Riverside in 1951, after both Parkville and Kansas City expressed interest in annexing the area. As of 2015, the store was still owned by the Young family.

The Renner Village Archeological Site was listed on the National Register of Historic Places in 1969.

== Geography ==
According to the United States Census Bureau, the city has a total area of 5.79 square miles (15.00 km^{2}), of which 5.51 square miles (14.27 km^{2}) is land and 0.28 square miles (0.73 km^{2}) is water. The Kansas City neighborhoods of Parkdale-Walden and Briarcliff West bound Riverside to the north and east, with the cities of Parkville and Northmoor interspersed along those boundaries.

== Demographics ==
Historical population
Census	Pop.	Note	%±
1960	1,315		—
1970	2,123		61.4%
1990	3,010		—
2000	2,979		−1.0%
2010	2,937		−1.4%
2020	4,013		36.6%
U.S. Decennial Census

=== 2020 census ===
As of the 2020 census, Riverside had a population of 4,013. The median age was 35.0 years. 25.9% of residents were under the age of 18 and 12.3% of residents were 65 years of age or older. For every 100 females there were 104.5 males, and for every 100 females age 18 and over there were 102.6 males age 18 and over.

100.0% of residents lived in urban areas, while 0.0% lived in rural areas.

There were 1,667 households in Riverside, of which 34.1% had children under the age of 18 living in them. Of all households, 37.9% were married-couple households, 27.1% were households with a male householder and no spouse or partner present, and 28.1% were households with a female householder and no spouse or partner present. About 35.1% of all households were made up of individuals and 9.4% had someone living alone who was 65 years of age or older.

There were 1,753 housing units, of which 4.9% were vacant. The homeowner vacancy rate was 0.8% and the rental vacancy rate was 5.4%.

Racial composition as of the 2020 census
Race	Number	Percent
White	2,507	62.5%
Black or African American	699	17.4%
American Indian and Alaska Native	35	0.9%
Asian	167	4.2%
Native Hawaiian and Other Pacific Islander	91	2.3%
Some other race	168	4.2%
Two or more races	346	8.6%
Hispanic or Latino (of any race)	374	9.3%

=== 2010 census ===
As of the census of 2010, there were 2,937 people, 1,308 households, and 672 families living in the city. The population density was 533.0 inhabitants per square mile (205.8/km^{2}). There were 1,499 housing units at an average density of 272.1 per square mile (105.1/km^{2}). The racial makeup of the city was 78.1% White, 10.5% African American, 1.2% Native American, 3.0% Asian, 0.6% Pacific Islander, 3.5% from other races, and 3.2% from two or more races. Hispanic or Latino of any race were 8.5% of the population.

There were 1,308 households, of which 26.6% had children under the age of 18 living with them, 33.3% were married couples living together, 13.0% had a female householder with no husband present, 5.1% had a male householder with no wife present, and 48.6% were non-families. 39.0% of all households were made up of individuals, and 7.4% had someone living alone who was 65 years of age or older. The average household size was 2.16 and the average family size was 2.91.

The median age in the city was 39.1 years. 21% of residents were under the age of 18; 8.7% were between the ages of 18 and 24; 29.2% were from 25 to 44; 28.6% were from 45 to 64; and 12.6% were 65 years of age or older. The gender makeup of the city was 51.1% male and 48.9% female.

=== 2000 census ===
At the 2000 census, there were 2,979 people, 1,222 households and 727 families living in the city. The population density was 559.2 inhabitants per square mile (215.9/km^{2}). There were 1,384 housing units at an average density of 259.8 per square mile (100.3/km^{2}). The racial makeup of the city was 84.66% White, 6.14% African American, 1.04% Native American, 2.32% Asian, 0.07% Pacific Islander, 3.05% from other races, and 2.72% from two or more races. Hispanic or Latino of any race were 7.08% of the population.

There were 1,222 households, of which 29.5% had children under the age of 18 living with them, 40.1% were married couples living together, 12.8% had a female householder with no husband present, and 40.5% were non-families. 33.2% of all households were made up of individuals, and 5.1% had someone living alone who was 65 years of age or older. The average household size was 2.28 and the average family size was 2.91.

22.3% of the population were under the age of 18, 10.9% from 18 to 24, 32.0% from 25 to 44, 22.7% from 45 to 64, and 12.1% who were 65 years of age or older. The median age was 35 years. For every 100 females, there were 103.2 males. For every 100 females age 18 and over, there were 102.2 males.

The median household income was $34,679 and the median family income was $36,205. Males had a median income of $31,930 versus $23,368 for females. The per capita income for the city was $17,771. About 7.3% of families and 10.3% of the population were below the poverty line, including 12.9% of those under age 18 and 2.4% of those age 65 or over.

== Education ==
It is in the Park Hill School District.

Four elementary schools take portions of Riverside: English Landing, Graden, Line Creek, and Southeast. Much of it is zoned to Lakeview Middle School while some is zoned to Walden Middle School. All residents are zoned to Park Hill South High School, which is in Riverside.

Metropolitan Community College has the Park Hill school district in its taxation area.

Riverside has a branch of the Mid-Continent Public Library.

== See also ==
- List of cities in Missouri
