= Adam Mesh =

American entrepreneur

Adam Mesh (born September 14, 1975) is an American entrepreneur, stock trader, television personality and author. He is the CEO and founder of The Adam Mesh Trading Group. Adam Mesh was first introduced to television audiences in the 2003 NBC show Average Joe. Mesh starred in the spin-off The Average Joe - Adam Returns.

== YOLO ==
Mesh launched the You Only Live Once (YOLO) clothing line on March 20, 2004.

Mesh helped popularize the acronym YOLO.

== The Adam Mesh Trading Group ==
The Adam Mesh Trading Group distribute a daily newsletter, products and a stock-trade coaching program. Mesh has been featured in Fortune magazine.

=== Personal life ===
Mesh is a graduate of Marlboro High School in Marlboro Township, New Jersey. Mesh was a graduate of the University of Michigan in 1997.

Mesh married Jessica Malca on May 28, 2006 in Miami, Florida.
