= Malcolm Baldrige National Quality Award =

US business award

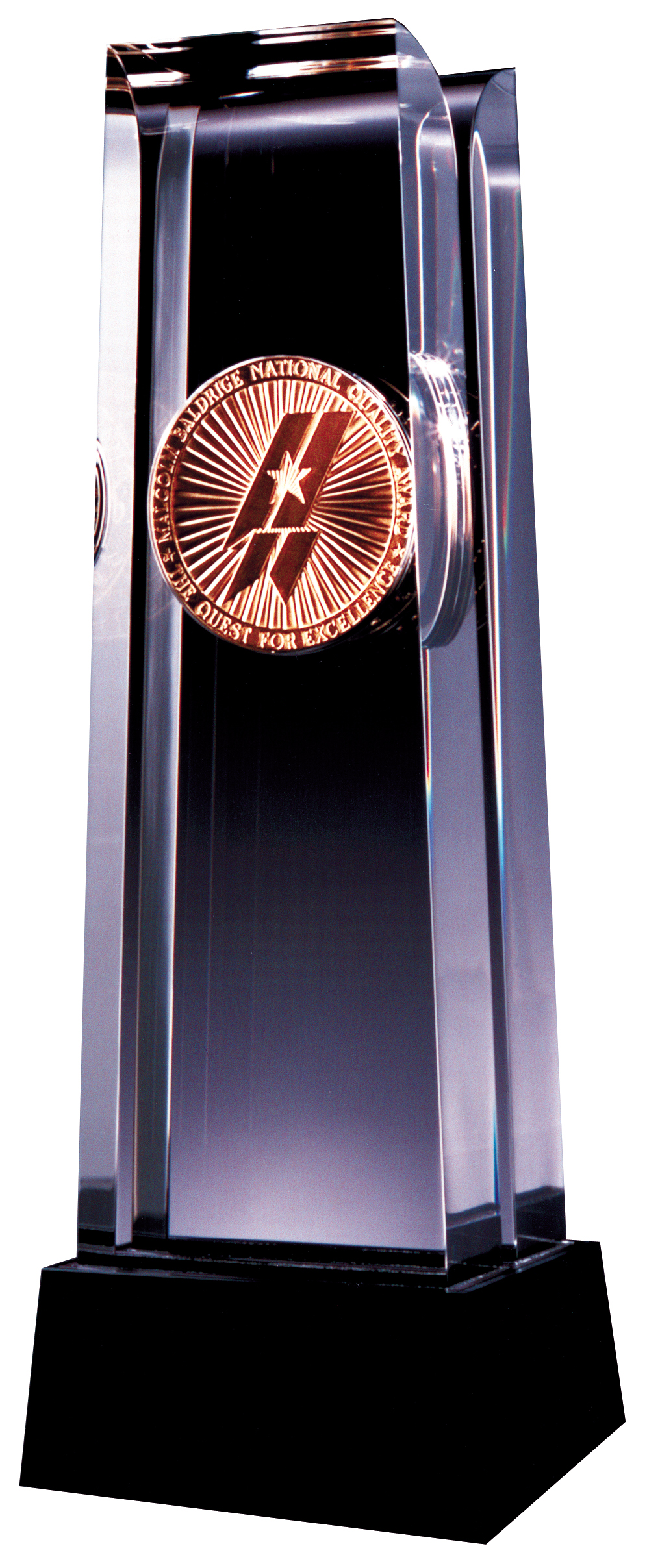
- Awarded for: Recognizing American organizations in all sectors of the economy for demonstrating performance excellence using the systems perspective and other core concepts and values of the Baldrige Excellence Framework; applicants are evaluated for the award against the criteria for performance excellence
- Sponsored by: National Institute of Standards and Technology
- Country: United States
- First award: November 14, 1988; 38 years ago
- Website: www.nist.gov/baldrige/baldrige-award

The Malcolm Baldrige National Quality Award recognizes U.S. organizations in the business, health care, education, and nonprofit sectors for performance excellence. The Baldrige Award is the highest formal recognition of the performance excellence of both public and private U.S. organizations given by the President of the United States. It is administered by the Baldrige Performance Excellence Program, which is based at and managed by the National Institute of Standards and Technology (NIST), an agency of the U.S. Department of Commerce.

The Baldrige Performance Excellence Program and the associated award were established by the Malcolm Baldrige National Quality Improvement Act of 1987 (Public Law 100–107). The program and award were named for Malcolm Baldrige, who served as United States Secretary of Commerce during the Reagan administration, from 1981 until Baldrige's 1987 death in a rodeo accident. The first award was given November 13, 1988. By 1991, The New York Times opinionated that the criteria should be broader and "tougher to win." In 2010, the program's name was changed to the Baldrige Performance Excellence Program.

The award is not given for specific products or services.

== Baldrige Excellence Framework ==
=== Overview ===
The Baldrige Excellence Framework has three parts: the Criteria for Performance Excellence, core values and concepts, and scoring guidelines. The framework serves two main purposes: (1) to help organizations assess their improvement efforts, diagnose their overall performance management system, and identify their strengths and opportunities for improvement and (2) to identify Baldrige Award recipients that will serve as role models for other organizations. In addition, the framework and its Criteria help strengthen U.S. competitiveness by • improving organizational performance practices, capabilities, and results • facilitating communication and sharing of information on best practices among U.S. organizations of all types • serving as a tool for understanding and managing performance and for guiding planning and opportunities for learning • The framework provide organizations with an integrated approach to performance management that results in • delivery of ever-improving value to customers and stakeholders, contributing to organizational sustainability • improved organizational effectiveness and capabilities • organizational and personal learning

The following three sector-specific versions of the Baldrige framework are revised every two years:

- Baldrige Excellence Framework (Business/Nonprofit)
- Baldrige Excellence Framework (Education)
- Baldrige Excellence Framework (Health Care)

=== Framework details ===
The framework provides organizations with an integrated approach to performance management that results in delivery of ever-improving value to customers and stakeholders, contributing to organizational sustainability improved organizational effectiveness and capabilities organizational and personal learning

The criteria for performance excellence are based on a set of core values:

- Systems perspective
- Visionary leadership
- Customer-focused excellence
- Valuing people
- Organizational learning and agility
- Focus on success
- Managing for innovation
- Management by fact
- Societal responsibility
- Ethics and transparency
- Delivering value and results

The questions that make up the criteria represent seven aspects of organizational management and performance:

- Leadership
- Strategy
- Customers
- Measurement, analysis, and knowledge management
- Workforce
- Operations
- Results

== History of the Baldrige Program ==
In the early and mid-1980s, many U.S. industry and government leaders saw that a renewed emphasis on quality was necessary for doing business in an expanding and competitive world market.

The Malcolm Baldrige National Quality Improvement Act of 1987, signed into law on August 20, 1987, was developed through the actions of the National Productivity Advisory Committee, chaired by Jack Grayson. The nonprofit research organization APQC, founded by Grayson, organized the first White House Conference on Productivity, spearheading the creation of the Malcolm Baldrige National Quality Award in 1987. The Baldrige Award was envisioned as a standard of excellence that would help U.S. organizations achieve competitive quality.

In the late summer and fall of 1987, Dr. Curt Reimann, the first director of the Malcolm Baldrige National Quality Program, and his staff at the National Institute of Standards and Technology developed an award implementation framework, including an evaluation scheme, and advanced proposals for what is now the Baldrige Award. In its first three years, the Baldrige Award was jointly administered by APQC and the American Society for Quality, which continues to assist in administering the award program under contract to NIST.

Up to 18 awards may be given annually across six eligibility categories—manufacturing, service, small business, education, health care, and nonprofit. As of 2016, 113 awards have been presented to 106 organizations (including seven repeat winners).

== Program impacts ==
- The ratio of Baldrige Program benefits for the U.S. economy to program costs has been estimated at 820 to 1
- A New York Times-generated investment portfolio composed of Baldrige awardees "beat the S.& P. by nearly 4 to 1."
- Median growth in revenue for two-time Baldrige Award winners is 92%.
- Median job growth for two-time Baldrige Award winners is 63% (compared with 2.5% for a matched set of industries and time periods).
- 2010–2015 Baldrige Award applicants represent 567,434 jobs, over $142 billion in revenue/budgets, and about 449 million customers served.
- The value of services donated in 2015
  - by 349 national Baldrige examiners was $5.3 million.
  - by state Baldrige-based examiners was $30 million.
- A 2013 study by Truven Health Analytics linked hospitals that adopt and use the Baldrige Criteria to successful operations, management practices, and overall performance.
  - According to survey results reported in Futurescan 2013, by 2018, 65% of hospitals are likely to "use the Baldrige Criteria for Performance Excellence as a systematic framework for performance improvement or as an internal assessment tool"
  - According to the same survey, 41% of hospitals were then considered likely to submit an application for the Baldrige Award or a state-level Baldrige-based award by 2018.

== Public-private partnership ==
The Baldrige Award is supported by a public-private partnership. The following organizations and entities play a key role:

- The Foundation for the Malcolm Baldrige National Quality Award raises funds to permanently endow the award program.
- The National Institute of Standards and Technology (NIST), an agency of the U.S. Department of Commerce, manages the Baldrige Program.
- The American Society for Quality (ASQ) assists in administering the award program under contract to NIST.
- The Board of Overseers advises the Department of Commerce on the Baldrige Program.
- Members of the Board of Examiners—consisting of leading experts from U.S. businesses and education, health care, and nonprofit organizations—volunteer their time to evaluate award applications and prepare feedback reports for applicant organizations. Board members also share information about the program in their professional, trade, community, and state organizations. The Panel of Judges, part of the Board of Examiners, makes award recommendations to the director of NIST.
- The network of state, regional, and local Baldrige-based award programs known as the Alliance for Performance Excellence provides potential award applicants and examiners, promotes the use of the Criteria, and disseminates information on the award process and concepts.
- The ISSA, the professional association for cybersecurity, is in formal partnership with the Baldrige Alliance for Performance Excellence. The Alliance and the ISSA offer a free Baldrige-based self-assessment of cybersecurity operations. It may be found at ManageHub
- Award recipients share information on their successful performance and quality strategies with other U.S. organizations.

== Baldrige Award Recipients ==
Year	Award Recipient	Sector
2024	Freese and Nichols Inc., Fort Worth, TX	Service
2024	Alamo Colleges District, San Antonio, TX	Education
2024	Chickasaw Nation Department of Health, Ada, OK	Health Care
2024	City of Henderson, Henderson, NV	Nonprofit
2024	Northeast Delta Dental, Concord, NH	Nonprofit
2021	MidwayUSA 2021	Service
2021	The Charter School of San Diego 2021	Education
2021	Mid-America Transplant 2021	Nonprofit
2020	MESA 2020	Small Business
2020	GBMC HealthCare, Inc.	Health Care
2020	Wellstar Paulding Hospital	Health Care
2020	AARP	Nonprofit
2020	Elevations Credit Union 2020	Nonprofit
2019	Howard Community College	Education
2019	Adventist Health White Memorial	Healthcare
2019	Mary Greeley Medical Center	Healthcare
2019	Center for Organ Recovery & Education	Nonprofit
2019	City of Germantown, TN	Nonprofit
2019	Illinois Municipal Retirement Fund	Nonprofit
2018	Integrated Project Management Company, Inc., Burr Ridge, IL	small business
2018	Donor Alliance, Denver, CO	nonprofit
2018	Memorial Hospital and Health Care Center, Jasper, IN	health care
2018	Alamo Colleges District, San Antonio, TX	education
2018	Tri County Tech, Bartlesville, OK	education
2017	Adventist Health Castle, Kailua, Hawaii	health care
2017	Bristol Tennessee Essential Services, Bristol, TN	small business
2017	Stellar Solutions, Palo Alto, CA	small business
2017	Southcentral Foundation, Anchorage, AK	health care
2017	City of Fort Collins, Fort Collins, CO	nonprofit
2016	Don Chalmers Ford, Rio Rancho, New Mexico	small business
2016	Momentum Group, Irvine, California	small business
2016	Kindred Nursing and Rehabilitation Center – Mountain Valley, Kellogg, Idaho	health care
2016	Memorial Hermann Sugar Land Hospital, Sugar Land, Texas	health care
2015	MidwayUSA, Columbia, Mo	small business
2015	Charter School of San Diego, San Diego, Calif.	education
2015	Charleston Area Medical Center Health System, Charleston, W.V.	health care
2015	Mid-America Transplant Services, St. Louis, Mo.	nonprofit
2014	PricewaterhouseCoopers Public Sector Practice, McLean, VA	service
2014	Hill Country Memorial Hospital, Fredericksburg, TX	health care
2014	St. David’s HealthCare, Austin, TX	health care
2014	Elevations Credit Union, Boulder, CO	nonprofit
2013	Pewaukee School District, Pewaukee, WI	education
2013	Sutter Davis Hospital, Davis, CA	health care
2012	Lockheed Martin Missiles and Fire Control, Grand Prairie, TX	manufacturing
2012	MESA Products Inc., Tulsa, OK	small business
2012	North Mississippi Health Services, Tupelo, MS	health care
2012	City of Irving, Irving, TX	nonprofit
2011	Concordia Publishing House, St. Louis, MO	nonprofit
2011	Henry Ford Health System, Detroit, MI	health care
2011	Schneck Medical Center, Seymour, IN	health care
2011	Southcentral Foundation, Anchorage, AK	health care
2010	MEDRAD, Warrendale, PA	manufacturing
2010	Nestlé Purina PetCare Co., St. Louis, MO	manufacturing
2010	Freese and Nichols Inc., Fort Worth, TX	small business
2010	K&N Management, Austin, TX	small business
2010	Studer Group, Gulf Breeze, FL	small business
2010	Advocate Good Samaritan Hospital, Downers Grove, IL	health care
2010	Montgomery County Public Schools, Rockville, MD	education
2009	Honeywell Federal Manufacturing & Technologies, Kansas City, MO	manufacturing
2009	MidwayUSA, Columbia, MO	small business
2009	AtlantiCare, Egg Harbor Township, NJ	health care
2009	Heartland Health, St. Joseph, MO	health care
2009	VA Cooperative Studies Program Clinical Research Pharmacy Coordinating Center, Albuquerque, NM	nonprofit
2008	Cargill Corn Milling North America, Wayzata, MN	manufacturing
2008	Poudre Valley Health System, Fort Collins, CO	health care
2008	Iredell-Statesville Schools, Statesville, NC	education
2007	PRO-TEC Coating Co., Leipsic, OH	small business
2007	Mercy Health System, Janesville, WI	health care
2007	Sharp Healthcare, San Diego, CA	health care
2007	City of Coral Springs, Coral Springs, FL	nonprofit
2007	United States Army Armament Research, Development and Engineering Center (ARDEC), Picatinny Arsenal, NJ	nonprofit
2006	MESA Products, Inc., Tulsa, OK	small business
2006	Premier Inc., San Diego, CA	service
2006	North Mississippi Medical Center, Tupelo, MS	health care
2005	Sunny Fresh Foods, Inc., Monticello, MN	manufacturing
2005	DynMcDermott Petroleum Operations, New Orleans, LA	service
2005	Park Place Lexus, Plano, TX	small business
2005	Richland College, Dallas, TX	education
2005	Jenks Public Schools, Jenks, OK	education
2005	Bronson Methodist Hospital, Kalamazoo, MI	health care
2004	The Bama Companies, Tulsa, OK	manufacturing
2004	Texas Nameplate Company, Inc., Dallas, TX	small business
2004	Kenneth W. Monfort College of Business, Greeley, CO	education
2004	Robert Wood Johnson University Hospital Hamilton, Hamilton, NJ	health care
2003	Medrad, Inc., Indianola, PA	manufacturing
2003	Boeing Aerospace Support, St. Louis, MO	service
2003	Caterpillar Financial Services Corp., Nashville, TN	service
2003	Stoner Inc., Quarryville, PA	small business
2003	Community Consolidated School District 15, Palatine, IL	education
2003	Baptist Hospital, Inc., Pensacola, FL	health care
2003	Saint Luke's Hospital of Kansas City, Kansas City, MO	health care
2002	Motorola Inc. Commercial, Government and Industrial Solutions Sector, Schaumburg, IL	manufacturing
2002	Branch-Smith Printing Division, Fort Worth, TX	small business
2002	SSM Health Care, St. Louis, MO	health care
2001	Clarke American Checks, Incorporated, San Antonio, TX	manufacturing
2001	Pal's Sudden Service, Kingsport, TN	small business
2001	Chugach School District, Prince William Sound, AK	education
2001	Pearl River School District, Pearl River, NY	education
2001	University of Wisconsin–Stout, Menomonie, WI	education
2000	Dana Corp.-Spicer Driveshaft Division, Toledo, OH	manufacturing
2000	KARLEE Company, Inc., Garland, TX	manufacturing
2000	Operations Management International, Inc., Greenwood Village, CO	service
2000	Los Alamos National Bank, Los Alamos, NM	small business
1999	STMicroelectronics, Inc.-Region Americas, Carrollton, TX	manufacturing
1999	BI Performance Services, Minneapolis, MN	service
1999	The Ritz-Carlton Hotel Company, L.L.C., Atlanta, GA	service
1999	Sunny Fresh Foods, Monticello, MN	small business
1998	Boeing Airlift and Tanker Programs, Long Beach, CA	manufacturing
1998	Solar Turbines Inc., San Diego, CA	manufacturing
1998	Texas Nameplate Company, Inc., Dallas, TX	small business
1997	3M Dental Products Division, St. Paul, MN	manufacturing
1997	Solectron Corp., Milpitas, CA	manufacturing
1997	Merrill Lynch Credit Corp., Jacksonville, FL	service
1997	Xerox Business Services, Rochester, NY	service
1996	ADAC Laboratories, Milpitas, CA	manufacturing
1996	Dana Commercial Credit Corp., Toledo, OH	service
1996	Custom Research Inc., Minneapolis, MN	small business
1996	Trident Precision Manufacturing Inc., Webster, NY	small business
1995	Armstrong World Industries’ Building Products Operation, Lancaster, PA	manufacturing
1995	Corning Telecommunications Products Division, Corning, NY	manufacturing
1994	AT&T Consumer Communications Services, Basking Ridge, NJ	service. Award presentation for the True Voice Quality team, was created and presented by Michael Levinger.
1994	GTE Directories Corp., Dallas/Ft. Worth, TX	service
1994	Wainwright Industries Inc., St. Peters, MO	small business
1993	Eastman Chemical Company, Kingsport, TN	manufacturing
1993	Ames Rubber Corp., Hamburg, NJ	small business
1992	AT&T Network Systems Group/Transmission Systems Business Unit, Morristown, NJ	manufacturing
1992	Texas Instruments Inc. Defense Systems & Electronics Group, Dallas, TX	manufacturing
1992	AT&T Universal Card Services, Jacksonville, FL	service
1992	The Ritz-Carlton Hotel Co., Atlanta, GA	service
1992	Granite Rock Co., Watsonville, CA	small business
1991	Solectron Corp., Milpitas, CA	manufacturing
1991	Zytec Corp., Eden Prairie, MN	manufacturing
1991	Marlow Industries, Dallas, TX	small business
1990	Cadillac Motor Car Division, Detroit, MI	manufacturing
1990	IBM Rochester, Rochester, MN	manufacturing
1990	Federal Express Corp., Memphis, TN	service
1990	Wallace Co. Inc., Houston, TX	small business
1989	Milliken & Co., Spartanburg, SC	manufacturing
1989	Xerox Corp. Business Products and Systems, Rochester, NY	manufacturing
1988	Motorola Inc., Schaumburg, IL	manufacturing
1988	Commercial Nuclear Fuel Division of Westinghouse Electric Corp., Pittsburgh, PA	manufacturing
1988	Globe Metallurgical Inc., Beverly, OH	small business

== See also ==
- President's Quality Award
- Excellence in Missouri Foundation – State level Baldrige-based award program for the State of Missouri
- The Partnership for Excellence – State level Baldrige-based award program for the States of Ohio, Indiana, and West Virginia
- List of national quality awards
- Total Quality Management
- Deming Prize
