= Kandace Krueger =

American beauty pageant contestant (born 1976)

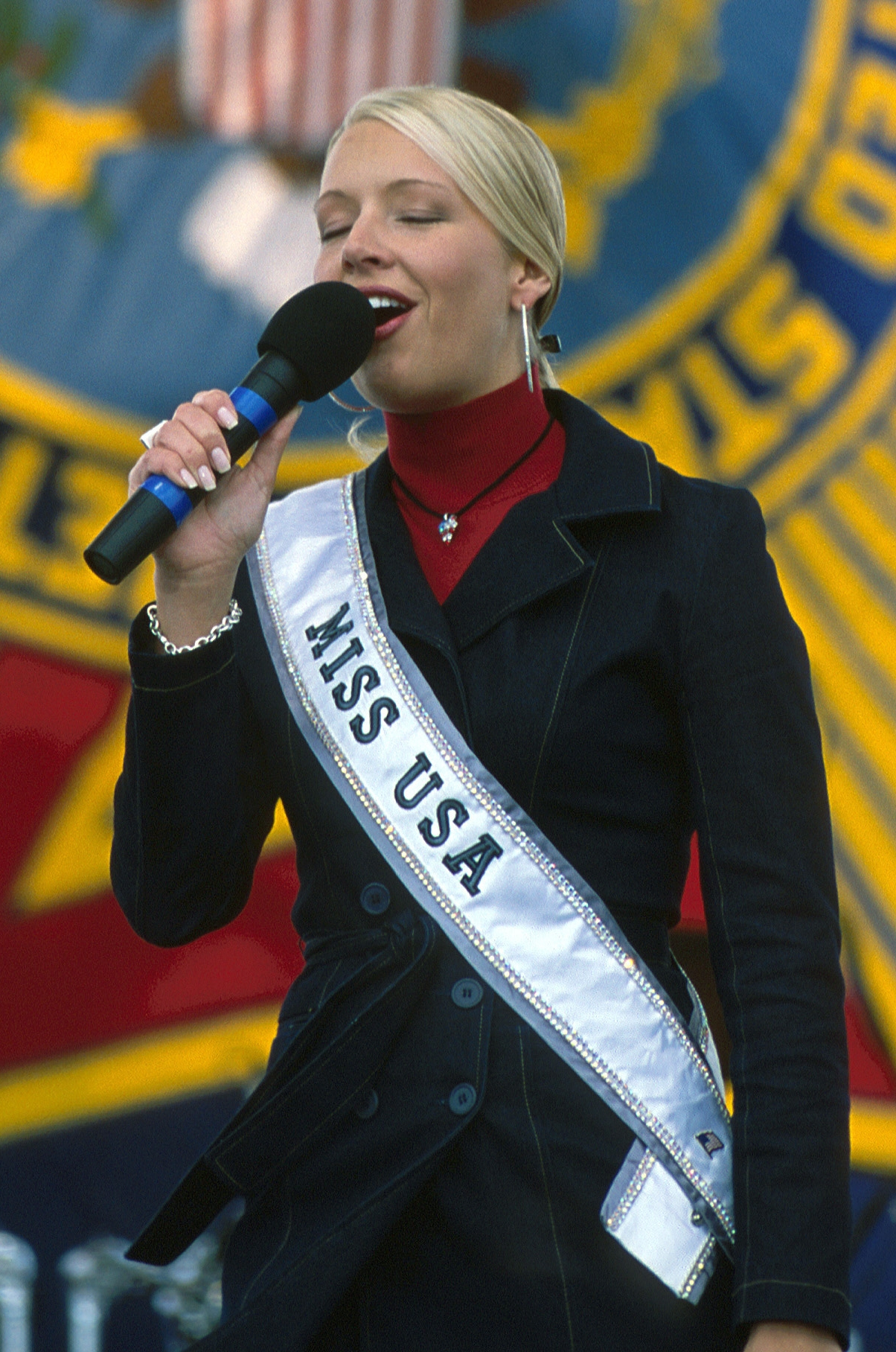
- Born: Kandace Gayle Krueger; May 27, 1976 (age 50); Austin, Texas, U.S.
- Beauty pageant titleholder
- Title: Miss Texas USA 2001; Miss USA 2001
- Major competitions: Miss Texas USA 2001; (Winner); Miss USA 2001; (Winner); Miss Universe 2001; (2nd Runner-Up)

Kandace Gayle Krueger Matthews (born May 27, 1976) is an American beauty pageant titleholder who won Miss USA 2001 and represented the United States in the Miss Universe 2001 where she was a finished second runner-up.

== Pageants ==
=== Miss Texas USA ===
Krueger started competing in local Miss Texas USA pageants aged 18, placing in the top five but not winning. She won her first local title, Miss Williamson County USA, in 1999 and her second, Miss Austin USA, in 2000. Krueger competed in the Miss Texas USA pageant numerous times in 1990s without placing, although she came close to making the top twelve in 1999 at the Miss Texas USA 2000 pageant. In 2000, her first appearance in the pageant semi-finals, Krueger won the Miss Texas USA 2001 title.

=== Miss USA 2001 ===
Krueger represented Texas at Miss USA 2001, in Gary, Indiana in March 2001. She reached the semi-finals, becoming the first Texan to make the top ten in three years, placed second in the swimsuit competition (9.38) and fourth in the evening gown competition (9.29). She entered the top five in second place, with an average combined score of 9.33. After the final interview round she was ranked second, but went on to win the pageant.

During her homecoming in Texas, she was given the key to the city of Austin, presented to the Senate, and met with governor Rick Perry.

=== Miss Universe 2001 ===
Krueger represented the United States at Miss Universe 2001 and was the second runner-up. Her national costume was a cowgirl.

Awards and achievements
Preceded by (Spain) Helen Lindes	Miss Universe second Runner-Up; 2001	Succeeded by (China) Zhuo Ling
Preceded by Lynnette Cole Tennessee	Miss USA; 2001	Succeeded by Shauntay Hinton District of Columbia
Preceded by Heather Ogilvie	Miss Texas USA; 2001	Succeeded by Kasi Kelly
