= Park Hill School District =

School district in Missouri, U.S.

Address
- 7703 Northwest Barry Road Kansas City, Missouri, 64153; United States
- Coordinates: 39°14′46″N 94°40′10″W

District information
- Type: Public
- Grades: PreK–12
- NCES District ID: 2923550

Students and staff
- Students: 11,992 (2020–2021)
- Teachers: 872.79 (on an FTE basis)
- Staff: 860.96 (on an FTE basis)
- Student–teacher ratio: 13.74:1

Other information
- Website: www.parkhill.k12.mo.us

The Park Hill School District (PHSD) encompasses most of southern Platte County, Missouri, in the Northland region of the Kansas City Metropolitan Area.

The district includes portions of Kansas City. Additionally, it has almost all of Parkville, and all of the following: Houston Lake, Lake Waukomis, Northmoor, Platte Woods, Riverside, and Weatherby Lake.

The district serves almost 12,000 students and has about 73 square miles (190 km^{2}) of area.

== Schools ==
High Schools:

- Park Hill High School
- Park Hill South High School

Alternative High School:

- L.E.A.D Innovation Studio

Middle Schools:

- Congress Middle School
- Lakeview Middle School
- Plaza Middle School
- Walden Middle School

Elementary Schools:

- Chinn Elementary School
- English Landing Elementary School
- Graden Elementary School
- Hawthorn Elementary School
- Hopewell Elementary School
- Line Creek Elementary School
- Prairie Point Elementary School
- Renner Elementary School
- Southeast Elementary School
- Tiffany Ridge Elementary School
- Union Chapel Elementary School
- Angeline Washington Elementary School

Preschool:

- Gerner Family Early Education Center

Special Education:

- Russell Jones Education Center
