= Miss Missouri USA =

Beauty pageant competition

- Formation: 1952
- Type: Beauty pageant
- Headquarters: Shawnee
- Location: Shawnee
- Members: Miss USA
- Official language: English
- Key people: John M. Vannatta; Jason Vannatta; Jennifer Vannatta-Fisher, State Pageant Director
- Website: Official website

The Miss Missouri USA competition is the pageant that selects the representative for the state Missouri in the Miss USA pageant. It is directed by Vanbros and Associates, based in Lenexa, Kansas. In 1993, Missouri joined the Vanbros group of state pageants for the Miss USA and Teen USA system.

Missouri has had only one Miss USA, Shandi Finnessey, who placed as 1st runner-up to Jennifer Hawkins of Australia in the Miss Universe 2004 pageant. The most recent placement was Shae Addison Smith in 2025, placing Top 20. Three Miss Missouri USAs have competed at Miss America, including Finnessey. Ten former Miss Teen USA delegates have also won the title one as former Miss Illinois Teen USA, equalling Indiana and Virginia for the most crossovers, although both Indiana and Missouri have had titleholders who competed in a different state at Miss Teen USA.

Madison Beck of Barnhart was crowned Miss Missouri USA 2026 on May 10, 2026 at The Mansion Theater in Branson. She will represent Missouri at Miss USA 2026.

== Gallery of titleholders ==
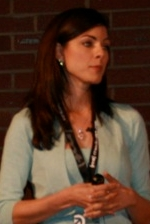
Larissa Meek, Miss Missouri USA 2001

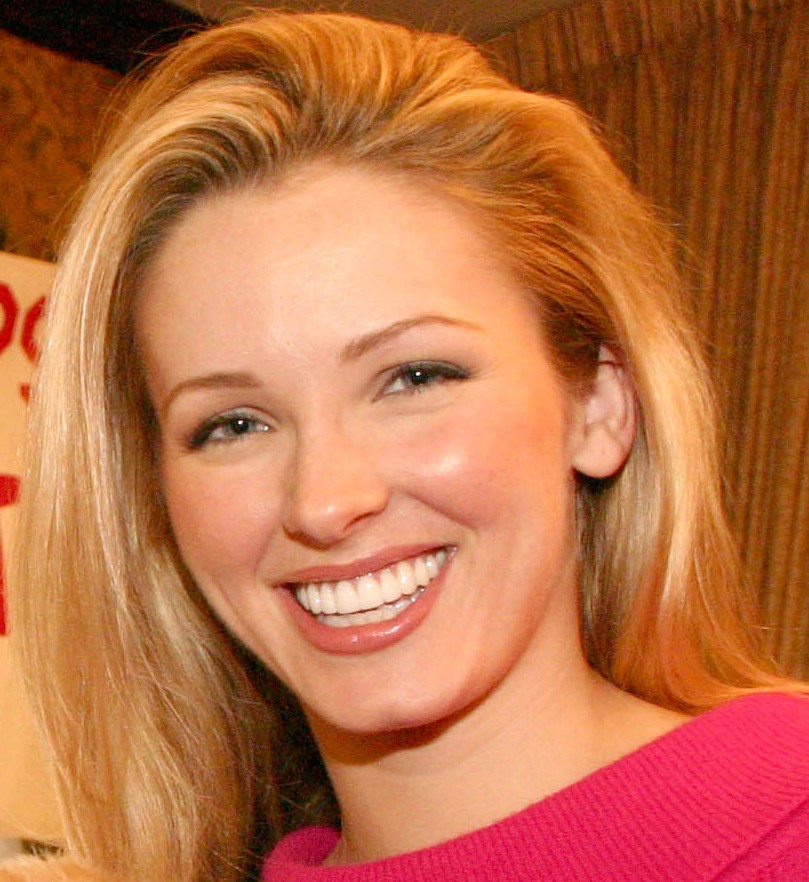
Shandi Finnessey, Miss Missouri USA and Miss USA 2004

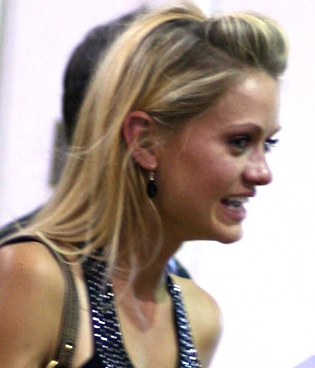
Amber Seyer, Miss Missouri USA 2007

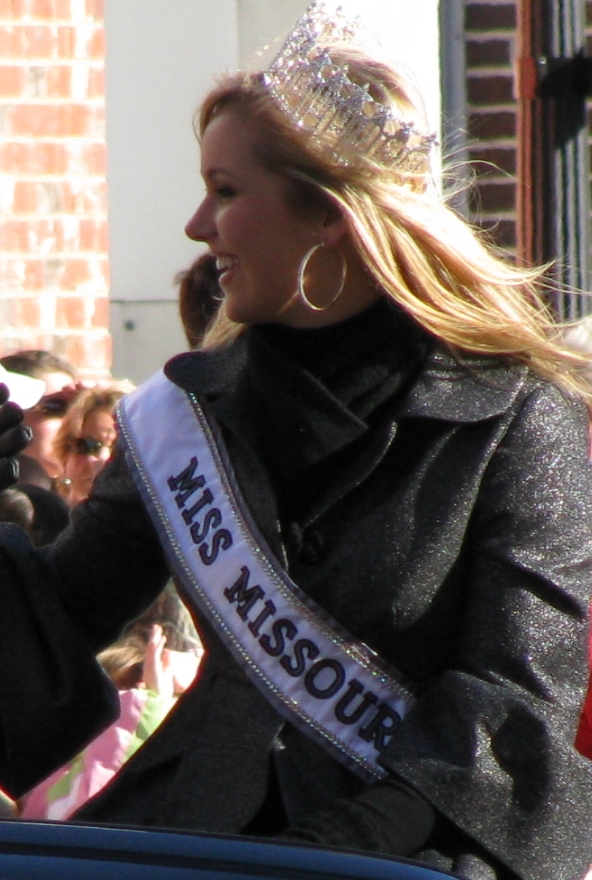
Candice Crawford, Miss Missouri USA 2008

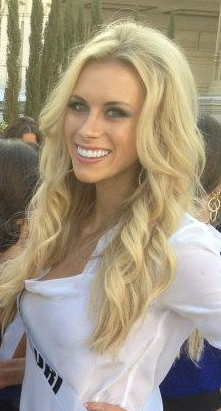
Katie Kearney, Miss Missouri USA 2012

== Results summary ==
=== Placements ===
- Miss USA's: Shandi Finnessey (2004)
- 2nd runners-up: Carolyn Corlew (1952), Sandra Lee Marlin (1963), Melanie Breedlove (1998)
- 3rd runners-up: Nancy Rebecca Rich (1971), Sandra Percival (1984), Dawn Fonseca (1987)
- 4th runner-up: Karen Hendrix (1967)
- Top 5: Larissa Meek (2001)
- Top 10/12: Dorothy Ann McElven (1974), Nancy LaRose (1975), Donna Hibbitts (1976), Amy Ruth Coverdale (1985), Shelly Lehman (1994), Britt Powell (1995), Amber Seyer (2007), Candice Crawford (2008), Ashley Strohmier (2010), Sydnee Stottlemyre (2016), Bayleigh Dayton (2017)
- Top 15/16/20: Alice Jean Porritt (1954), Barbara Jayne Stell (1959), Marilyn Jean Stalcup (1960), Hope Driskill (2011), Megan Renee Kelly (2020), Mikala McGhee (2022), Shae Smith (2025)

Missouri holds a record of 27 placements at Miss USA.

=== Awards ===
- Miss Congeniality: Bayleigh Dayton (2017)
- Best State Costume: Shae Smith (2025)

== Winners ==
Color key

- Declared as Winner
- Ended as runner-up
- Ended as one of the finalists or semifinalists

Year	Name	Hometown	Age (Note: Age at the time of crowning)	Local title	Placement at Miss USA	Special awards at Miss USA	Notes
2026	Madison Beck	Barnhart	21	Miss Jefferson County			Previously Miss Missouri Teen USA 2023; Top 20 at Miss Teen USA 2023
2025	Shae Addison Smith	Bolivar	22	Miss Springfield	Top 20	Best State Costume	Triple crown winner: Previously Miss Missouri's Outstanding Teen 2019; 4th runner-up at Miss America's Outstanding Teen 2020; Miss Missouri Teen USA 2022
2024	Ashleigh Bedwell	Campbell	25	Miss Heartland			
2023	Autumn Black	Kansas City	24	Miss Kansas City			
2022	Mikala McGhee	St. Louis	28	Miss St. Louis	Top 16		Appeared on MTV reality show Made
2021	Joye Forrest	Spanish Lake	25	Miss Spanish Lake			Former professional cheerleader of Laker Girls
2020	Megan Renee Kelly	Seymour	22	Miss Springfield	Top 16		
2019	Miriah Jo Ludtke	St. Louis	24	Miss City of St. Louis			
2018	Victoria "Tori" Ann Kruse	Osage Beach	26	Miss Osage Beach			
2017	Bayleigh Amethyst Dayton	Lee's Summit	23	Miss Kansas City	Top 10	Miss Congeniality (tied with Miss Wyoming USA 2017 Mikaela Shaw)	Later a 2x HouseGuest on Big Brother; First ever African-American Miss Missouri USA; Later a contestant in The Challenge: Total Madness
2016	Sydnee Nicole Stottlemyre	Chesterfield	21	Miss Wildhorse Creeks	Top 10		Triple crown winner: Previously Miss Missouri's Outstanding Teen 2008; 4th runner-up at Miss America's Outstanding Teen 2009; Miss Missouri Teen USA 2011; 4th runner-up at Miss Teen USA 2011
2015	Rebecca Elaine Dunn	Columbia	23	Miss Columbia			Game Day Host for the Missouri Mavericks and Entertainment Host for Fox 22. Former anchor at Newsy.com.
2014	Erica Danielle Sturdefant	Springfield	23	Miss Creve Coeur			Previously Miss Missouri Teen USA 2010
2013	Ellie Holtman	Montgomery City	20	Miss Montgomery			
2012	Katie Kearney	St. Louis	23	Miss St. Louis			
2011	Hope Driskill	Jefferson City	21	Miss Jefferson City	Top 16		Contestant of Survivor: Caramoan as a part of "fans" tribe; Cousin of Hayden Brax, Miss Kansas USA 2020
2010	Ashley Lauren Strohmier	Jefferson City	21	Miss Cole County	Top 10		ABC 17 KMIZ Evening News Anchor
2009	Stacey Smith	Florissant	22	Miss Florissant			
2008	Candice Crawford	Columbia	21	Miss Mid Missouri	Top 10		Sister of actor Chace Crawford and wife of NFL quarterback Tony Romo.
2007	Amber Marie Seyer	Oran	20	Miss Scott County	Top 10		Previously Miss Missouri Teen USA 2003; Wife of baseball pitcher Barry Zito
2006	Kristi Marie Capel	Springfield	22	Miss Ozark Country			Weather presenter at WBRE
2005	Andrea Ciliberti	Kansas City	21	Miss North Kansas City			Contestant on Beauty and the Geek, season 3
2004	Ashley Renee Litton	Columbia	20	Miss Columbia	did not compete		Top 15 semi-finalist at Miss Missouri USA 2004; Assumed the state title after 1st runner-up Danielle Crafton (when she already crowned a title unrelated to Miss USA system) declined the title when Shandi Finnessey won Miss USA title
2004	Shandi Ren Finnessey	Florissant	25	Miss St. Louis Metro	Miss USA 2004		1st runner-up at Miss Universe 2004; Previously Miss Missouri 2002; 3rd runner-up at Miss Oktoberfest 2000
2003	Tara Bollinger	Chesterfield	23	Miss West County			
2002	Melana Scantlin	Gladstone	24	Miss Kansas City			Previously Miss Missouri Teen USA 1995; Top 12 at Miss Teen USA 1995; Reality television star who competed in Average Joe
2001	Larissa Meek	St. Louis	23	Miss Gateway to the West	Top 5		Previously Miss Missouri Teen USA 1997; Reality television star who competed in Average Joe
2000	Denetta Renee "Denette" Roderick		24	Miss Lebanon			
1999	Teri Bollinger		26	Miss St. Louis			Previously Miss Illinois Teen USA 1990
1998	Melanie Jeanine Breedlove		22	Miss Wright County	2nd runner-up		Previously Miss Missouri Teen USA 1993
1997	Amanda Jahn	St Joseph	25	Miss St. Joseph			
1996	Aimee Danielle Rinehart		24	Miss Kansas City			
1995	Brigitta Dara "Britt" Powell	Kansas City		Miss Kansas City	Semi-finalist		Later Mrs. Arizona America 2004 under her married name, Britt Boyse; Current director of Arizona pageants in Miss and Teen divisions.
1994	Shelly Lehman			Miss Springfield	Semi-finalist		
1993	Stephanie Nunn	Marshfield		Miss Springfield			Mother of Miss Missouri Teen USA 2016 Dallas Ezard
1992	Tonya Snodgrass	Springfield					Mother of Miss Arkansas Teen USA 2016 Makenzie Sexton
1991	Tiffany Hazell	Sedalia					
1990	Lori Marie Suschnick	Liberal					Mother of Miss Missouri Teen USA 2018 Chloe Bartlett
1989	Rhonda Hoglen	Gladstone					Previously Miss Missouri Teen USA 1985; 3rd runner-up at Miss Teen USA 1985
1988	Alecia Workman	Maryland Heights	21				
1987	Dawn Theresa Fonseca	Independence	21		3rd runner-up		
1986	Barbara Webster	Kansas City					Previously Miss Missouri 1983; Top 10 semifinalist for Miss America 1984
1985	Amy Ruth Coverdale	Columbia	22		Semi-finalist		
1984	Saundra Lee "Sandy" Percival	Sunrise Beach	20		3rd runner-up		Competed at Miss International 1984
1983	Robin Elizabeth Riley	Columbia	20				Later Miss Missouri 1987, top 10 semifinalist for Miss America 1988
1982	Susan Marie Heiman	Kansas City	21				
1981	Karyn Marie Smagacz	Fulton	19	Miss Fulton			
1980	Kelly Laxson	Kansas City	20				
1979	Virginia Dean	Rolla	21				
1978	Paula Anita Taylor			Miss Columbia			
1977	Connie Ast	Chesterfield					Originally first runner-up, assumed the title when Leigh Middleton was unable to compete at Miss USA
1977	Leigh Ann Middleton	Florissant			did not compete		Won the title of Miss Missouri USA 1977, but due to car accident, was unable to continue her reign or compete at Miss USA
1976	Donna Hibbitts				Semi-finalist		
1975	Nancy LaRose	Marshall			Semi-finalist		
1974	Dorothy Ann "Tweetie" McElveen				Semi-finalist		
1973	Camilla Crist	Shelbina					
1972	Janet Potter						
1971	Nancy Rebecca Rich	Springfield			3rd runner-up		
1970	Suzette Grinham	Independence					
1969	Cherrie Hoffmann	Kansas City					
1968	Jan Mary Barton	Macon					
1967	Karen Hendrix	Independence			4th runner-up		
1966	Martha Taylor	Independence					
1965	Barbara Brooks	Kansas City					
1964	Sandy Bawol	Florissant					4th runner up in Miss World USA 1963
1963	Sandra Lee Marlin	Springfield			2nd runner-up		
1962	Mikee Campbell	Springfield		Miss Empire Rank			
1961	Joan Roberts						
1960	Marilyn Jean Stalcup	Normandy			Semi-finalist		
1959	Barbara Jayne Stell	Kansas City	23		Semi-finalist		
1958	Beverly Sue Wright	St. Louis	19				
1957	Judith Ann Murback	Sikeston	18				
1957	Carole Learn	Ferguson	19				Competed as Miss St. Louis
1956	Carol Rhea Thrower	Kennett	18				
1956	Diana Stopke	St. Louis	18				Competed as Miss St. Louis
1955	Janet Coker	Caruthersville	18				
1955	Bennie Joan Pritchard	University City	20				Competed as Miss St. Louis
1954	Alice Jean Porritt	Cape Girardeau	19		Semi-finalist		
1954	Jo Ann Lynde	Moline Acres	18				Competed as Miss St. Louis
1953	Donna Gardner	Portageville/Union City, TN	18				
1952	Carolyn Corlew	Sikeston	18		2nd runner-up		
