= Average Joe (2003 TV series) =

Television series

- Genre: Reality television
- Directed by: Tony Croll; Jason Raff (Season 1)
- Country of origin: United States
- Original language: English
- No. of seasons: 4

Production
- Executive producers: Andrew Glassman; Jason Raff
- Production companies: Krasnow Productions; NBC Studios

Original release
- Network: NBC
- Release: November 3, 2003 – June 28, 2005

Average Joe is an American reality television show broadcast on NBC from November 3, 2003 to June 28, 2005. There were a total of four seasons, the first two following the original show premise, and the last two bringing back contestants from prior seasons.

== Premise ==
Instead of attempting to make a "dream couple" between two extremely attractive people, Average Joe tried to get 16 to 18 ordinary men to win the heart of a beauty queen. The men were what the producers considered to be average in appearance, with many being overweight or underweight and nerdy, or awkward in their behavior and personalities.

Prior to the show's start, the beauty queen was not aware she was to be dating "average" men. She was instead led to believe her show was going to feature only handsome suitors. (The second series, taped before the first one aired, also contained this element, thus avoiding the problem associated with the second season of Joe Millionaire.) Halfway through the show, several handsome suitors appear and compete against the average Joes.

Throughout the show the beauty went on various dates with the men, both in groups and individually (at her choice). When the attractive suitors show up, there were also competitions between the rival groups of men. At the end of every episode the beauty votes to send a certain number (usually four) of the men home. In the end, she must pick only one to go on an intimate vacation with.

== Seasons ==
=== Average Joe ===
The first two Average Joe series were intended to be somewhat of a mockery of traditional set-up shows such as The Bachelor and Joe Millionaire. The show was marketed to have an implied moral subtext, namely that beauty was only skin deep, and that personality could ultimately triumph over looks. However, the first two seasons ended in a way that seemed to prove the opposite. In Average Joe, Melana Scantlin chose Jason Peoples, one of the attractive suitors, over Adam Mesh, the last remaining Average Joe. Kathy Griffin was the host.

=== Average Joe: Hawaii ===
In the second season, Average Joe: Hawaii, Larissa Meek chose attractive Gil Hyatt over Average Joe Brian Worth. A few days later, on a "honeymoon" between Hyatt and Meek, Larissa revealed she had once dated Fabio, which caused Gil to leave her in disgust. Meek now owns a website design and art company registered and situated in Fort Lauderdale, which is Hyatt's hometown. They are not a couple any longer, according to Meek's blog. She said "we gave it our best but decided to part ways."

=== Average Joe: Adam Returns ===
The third season, Average Joe: Adam Returns, featured the return of rejected contestant Adam Mesh, this time as the object of the affections of 19 female contestants. The women in this situation were a mixture of fairly attractive and average, with the busload of "babes" arriving later sent home immediately by Adam. In the final episode, Adam chose saleswoman Samantha Trenk over schoolteacher Rachel Goetz.

=== Average Joe: The Joes Strike Back ===
The fourth season entitled Average Joe: The Joes Strike Back started airing on June 28, 2005. The name references The Empire Strikes Back. In this season, one rejected Joe from each week received a complete makeover and the opportunity at another chance with the show's beauty Anna Chudoba. In the end, Anna chose Average Joe Nathan Griffin over model/bartender Rocky Fain, breaking the "Joes" losing streak. A contestant on Average Joe: Hawaii, Alfred "Fredo" LaPonza, along with two other men, sued NBC claiming the network used ideas of theirs on the show. Matt Hoffman, who later appeared on Big Brother 12 (American season), was a contestant on Average Joe: The Joes Strike Back and was eliminated on the first episode of the season.

== Syndication and other spinoffs ==
GSN had acquired the first two seasons in 2004. Episodes were also aired on the Fox Reality Channel.

A role-reversal version of the show, with a series of ordinary women who were to compete for the love of a very handsome man, to be entitled "Plain Jane", was announced as being in the works, but such a show never materialized. The title was eventually used for another reality series with a different concept.

== International adaptations ==
A local version of Average Joe has been made in France based on the original American format. Licensing of the format is handled by NBCUniversal.

Country	Name	Channel	No. of episodes	First aired
France	La Belle et ses Princes Presque Charmants	W9	Season 1 : 8 Season 2 : 7 Season 3 : 8	3 April 2012 - 15 May 2012; 16 April 2013 - 30 May 2013; 25 November 2013 - 8 January 2014
