= Charlotte Ray =

American model and beauty pageant titleholder

- Born: Charlotte Ray; Camden, New Jersey, United States
- Height: 1.75 m (5 ft 9 in)
- Beauty pageant titleholder
- Title: Miss New Jersey USA 1991; Miss World USA 1991
- Hair color: Brown
- Eye color: Brown
- Major competitions: Miss USA 1991 (1st runner-up); Miss World 1991 (Top 10)

Charlotte Ray is an American model and beauty pageant titleholder who competed in the Miss USA and Miss World pageants.

== Miss USA ==
On her first attempt and with no prior pageant experience, Ray won the title of Miss New Jersey USA 1991 in August 1990. She went on to represent New Jersey in the 1991 Miss USA pageant, which was televised live from Wichita, Kansas, on February 22, 1991. Ray made the top ten in seventh place after the preliminary competition, and won the interview portion of the semifinal competition and came fourth in swimsuit. After the evening gown, swimsuit and interview competitions, Ray's average score placed her third overall. She improved after the final question, placing first runner-up to Kelli McCarty of Kansas.

== Miss World ==
Later that year, as first runner-up to Miss USA 1991, Ray gained the right to represent the United States at Miss World 1991 held in Atlanta, Georgia. She was a top 10 semifinalist in that pageant, which was won by Ninibeth Leal of Venezuela.

Awards and achievements
Preceded by Gina Marie Tolleson (South Carolina)	Miss World USA; 1991	Succeeded by Sharon Flynn Belden (Florida)
