= Miss New Jersey USA =

Beauty pageant competition

- Formation: 1952; 74 years ago
- Type: Beauty pageant
- Headquarters: Newark
- Location: New Jersey
- Members: Miss USA
- Official language: English
- Key people: Deborah Miller; Cindy Provost
- Website: Official website

The Miss New Jersey USA competition is the pageant that selects the representative for the state of New Jersey in the Miss USA pageant. It is produced by D&D Productions.

New Jersey has yet to win the Miss USA title, although from 1989 to 1991 they had two 2nd runners-up and one 1st runner-up in a row. Two years later, another Miss New Jersey USA placed in the finals, and in 2008, Tiffany Andrade finished as 2nd runner up, one of three Miss New Jersey USAs to place third at Miss USA. In the year 2017, 1st runner-up placement was achieved by Miss New Jersey USA 2017, Chhavi Verg. The most recent placement was Ivy Harrington in 2025, placing as 1st runners-up.

Five Miss New Jersey USA titleholders have held the Miss New Jersey Teen USA title and two have competed at Miss America.

Katarina Lengyel of Middletown was crowned Miss New Jersey USA 2026 on July 26, 2026 at the Hilton Parsippany in Parsippany-Troy Hills. She will represent New Jersey at Miss USA 2026.

== Gallery of titleholders ==
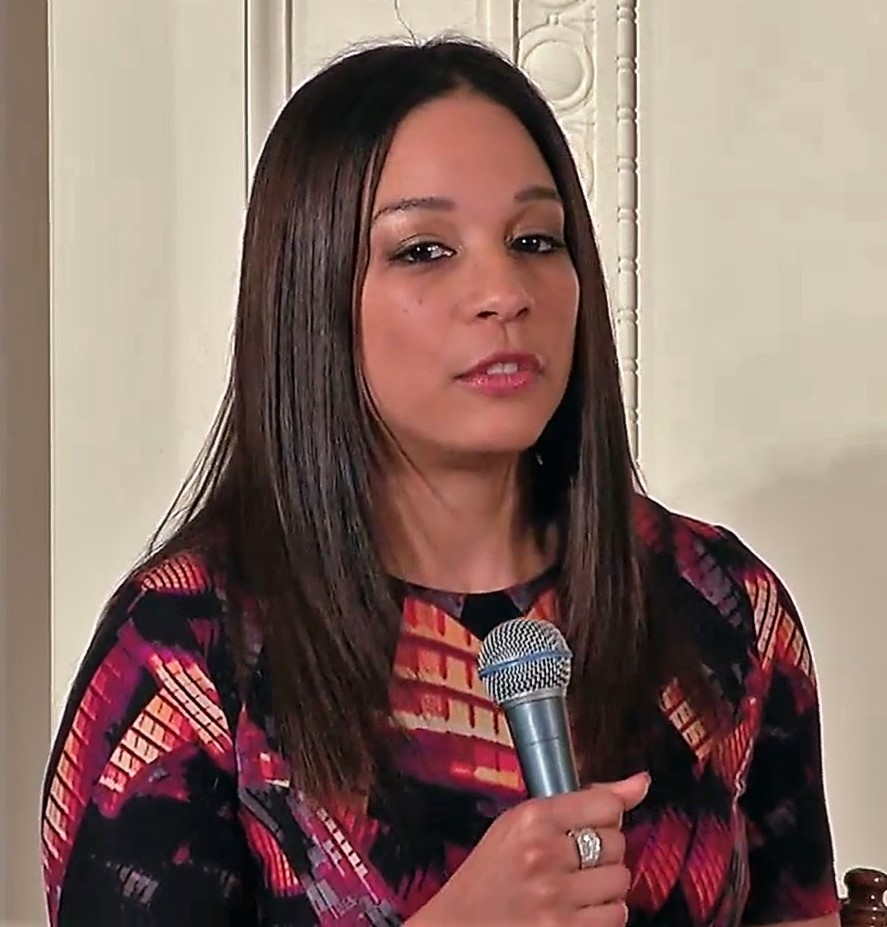
Janaye Ingram, Miss New Jersey USA 2004

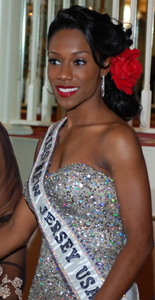
Kaity Rodriguez, Miss New Jersey USA 2009

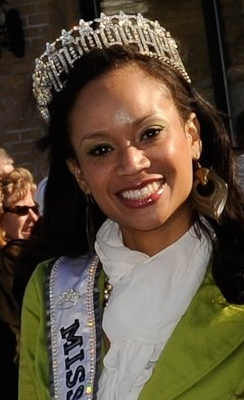
Chenoa Greene, Miss New Jersey USA 2010

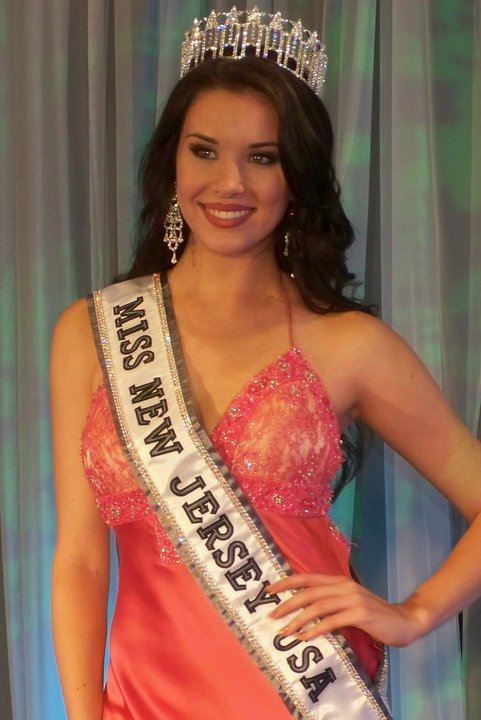
Julianna White, Miss New Jersey USA 2011

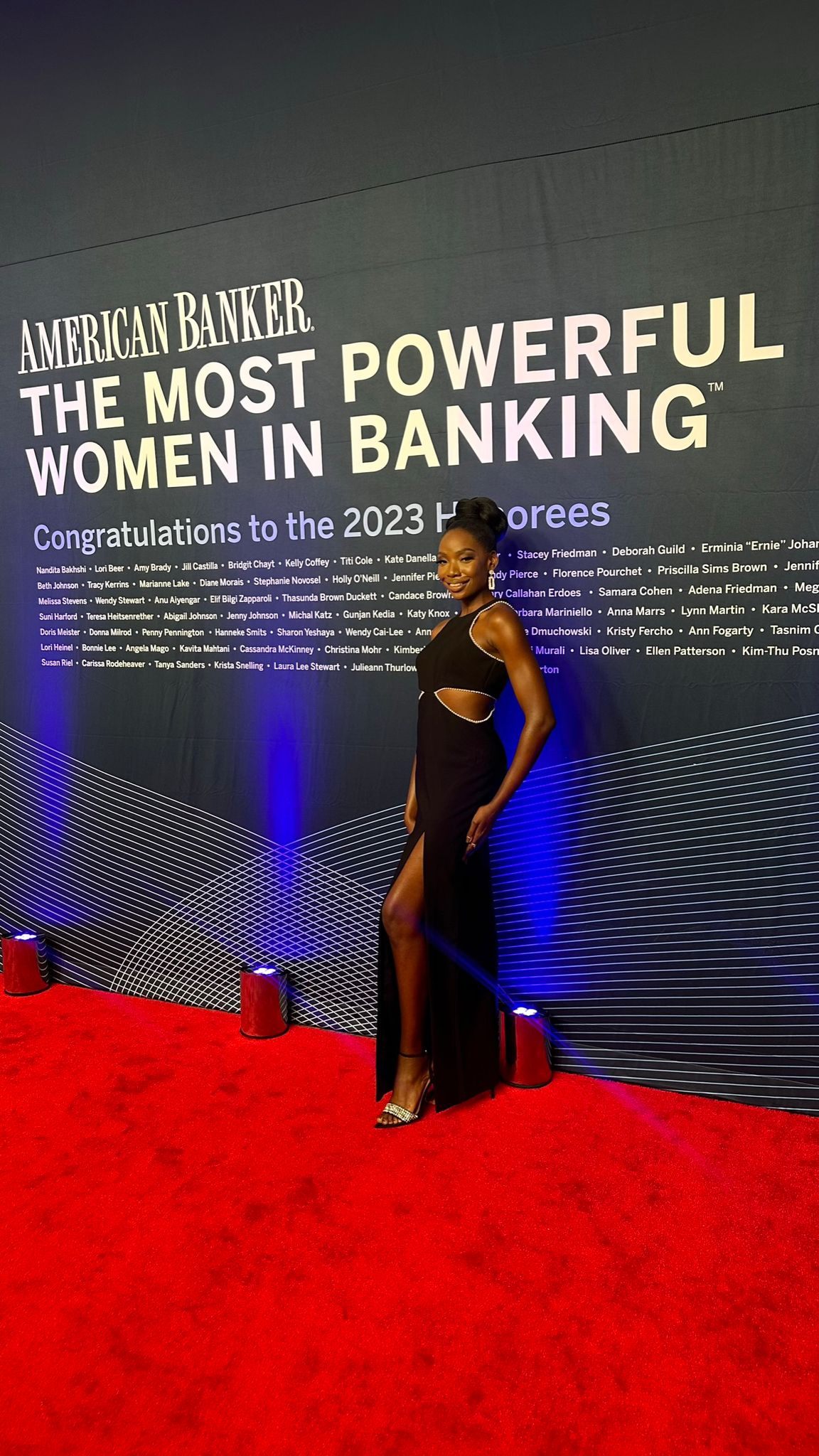
Derby Chukwudi, Miss New Jersey USA 2023

== Results summary ==
=== Placements ===
- 1st runners-up: Charlotte Ray (1991), Chhavi Verg (2017), Ivy Harrington (2025)
- 2nd runners-up: Deborah Lee Husti (1989), Karin Hartz (1990), Tiffany Andrade (2008)
- Top 6: Amy Fissel (1993)
- Top 10/12: Ruth Jane Hampton (1952), Cathy Russell (1975), Juanita McCarty (1977), Jennifer Makris (1997), Michelle Leonardo (2012), Alexa Noone (2018), Gina Mellish (2020)
- Top 15/20: Evelyn Orowitz (1954), Dolores Winfield (1956), Sandra "Sandy" Chudy (1960), Diane Gierson (1961), Barbara Richartz (1964), Emily Shah (2014), Derby Chukwudi (2023)

New Jersey holds a record of 21 placements at Miss USA.

=== Awards ===
- Miss Congeniality: Lisa Summeroury-Perry (1986), Charlotte Ray (1991)

== Winners ==
Color key

- Declared as Winner
- Ended as runner-up or finalist
- Ended as one of the semifinalists

Year	Name	Hometown	Age (Note: Age at the time of crowning)	Local title	Placement at Miss USA	Special awards at Miss USA	Notes
2026	Katarina Lengyel	Middletown	25	Miss Middletown			
2025	Ivy Harrington	Neptune	30	Miss Neptune	1st runner-up		
2024	Jabili Kandula	Hoboken	24	Miss Hoboken			
2023	Derby Chukwudi	Hoboken	25	Miss Hudson	Top 20		
2022	Alexandra Lakhman	Hoboken	26				
2021	Celinda Ortega	Fair Lawn	26				
2020	Gina Mellish	Oceanport	20		Top 10		Previously Miss New Jersey Teen USA 2016; Longest reigning Miss New Jersey USA (1 year, 8 months, and 8 days)
2019	Manya Saaraswat	Morganville	21				Born in India: Miss World America Pennsylvania 2020; 2nd runner-up at Miss World America 2020
2018	Alexa Noone	Bayonne	23		Top 10		
2017	Chhavi Verg	Edison	19		1st runner-up		Born in India
2016	Jessielyn Palumbo	Wayne	23				
2015	Vanessa Oriolo	Colts Neck	21				
2014	Emily Shah	Edison	18		Top 20		Previously Miss Teen India 2011 and first runner up at Miss Teen World 2011. Opened Super Bowl XLVIII in New Jersey.
2013	Libell Duran	Keasbey	22				Born in Dominican Republic: Previously Miss Comunidad Dominicana en Estados Unidos 2010 and 3rd Runner-Up at Miss Dominican Republic 2010
2012	Michelle Leonardo	Tinton Falls	20		Top 10		Previously Miss New Jersey Teen USA 2008
2011	Julianna "Julie" White	Haddon Township	21				Previously Miss New Jersey Teen USA 2006
2010	Chenoa Greene	Atco	24				
2009	Kaity Rodriguez	Clifton	24				
2008	Tiffany Andrade	Linden	22		2nd runner-up		
2007	Erin Abrahamson	Essex Fells	23				Originally first runner-up, assumed the title after Ashley Harder's resignation; Previously Miss New Jersey Teen USA 2001; Later Mrs. New Jersey 2015
2007	Ashley Harder	Marlton	20		did not compete		Resigned in January 2007 due to pregnancy and failing to follow pageant rules
2006	Jessica Boyington	Sicklerville	20				Former NBC 10 and 6 ABC Philadelphia morning traffic reporter. Currently unemployed.
2005	Sylvia Pogorzelski	East Hanover	20				YouTube personality Grace Helbig placed 7th in this competition
2004	Janaye Ingram	Cherry Hill	25				
2003	Vanessa Baker	Marlton	23				
2002	Robin Williams	Lawrenceville					
2001	Jeannette Josue	Jersey City					
2000	Michelle Graci	Jamesburg					
1999	Melissa McLaughlin	Cinnaminson					
1998	Kelli Paarz	Linwood					Previously Miss New Jersey Teen USA 1994, top 12 in Miss Teen USA 1994
1997	Jennifer Makris	Cranbury	23		Top 10		Previously Miss New Jersey 1994, 2nd runner up at Miss America 1995
1996	Christina Augustyn	Woodbridge	24				
1995	Christy Joy Pittner	Ventnor					
1994	Rosa Velez	Newark					
1993	Amy Fissel	Ocean City	25		Top 6		Previously Miss New Jersey 1991
1992	Kathy Kasprak	Edison					
1991	Charlotte Ray	Voorhees	24		1st runner-up	Miss Congeniality	Semi-finalist at Miss World 1991
1990	Karin Hartz	Voorhees	24		2nd runner-up		
1989	Deborah Lee Husti	Rockaway	21		2nd runner-up		Semifinalist at Miss International 1989 as Miss USA
1988	Colleen Carlone	Parsippany					
1987	Stacey Fox	East Brunswick	19				
1986	Lisa Summeroury-Perry	Egg Harbor Township				Miss Congeniality	Represented New Jersey in Miss Oktoberfest 1987, did not place
1985	Francie Knapp	Linwood					
1984	Diane Everett Qualter	Englewood					
1983	Ann Marie Brucato	Bloomfield		Miss Bloomfield			
1982	Janice Lynn Straub	Cherry Hill		Miss Camden County			
1981	Christy Garthwaite	Tuckerton					
1980	Joni Peifer	Franklinville					
1979	Robin Senatore	Jackson					
1978	Sheryl Ann Hoehn	Clark					
1977	Juanita McCarty	Pemberton	18		Semi-finalist		1st runner-up at Miss World USA 1976 as Miss Pennsylvania, 1st runner-up at Mrs America 1988
1976	Ginger Hagaman	Weekstown					
1975	Cathy Russell	Cranford	19		Semi-finalist		
1974	Patricia Sims	Jackson					
1973	Patricia Everett	Runnemede					
1972	Leila DeSantis	Point Pleasant					
1971	Brenda Joyce White	Delair					
1970	Ellen Cream	Pennsauken					
1969	Nancy Fromel	Washington					
1968	Linda Papa	Secaucus					
1967	Jean Galata	Union City					
1966	Jo Ann Franchi	Camden					
1965	Kay Franzen	Bridgeton					
1964	Barbara Joan Richartz	Stratford	19		Semi-finalist		
1963	Judy Kay Ayars	Salem					
1962	Joyce Claire Thomson	Bellmar					
1961	Diane Gierson	Red Bank	19		Semi-finalist		
1960	Sandra Mary "Sandy" Chudy	Bound Brook	20		Top 15		First runner-up in Miss New Jersey 1959; Later participated in the National Sweetheart 1961 pageant as Miss Louisiana
1959	Geraldine Binder	Irvington					
1958	Faye Hasenauer	Menlo Park Terrace					
1957	Jeanne Lewis	Kearny					
1956	Dolores Winfield	Cranford	21		Semi-finalist		
1955	Beverly Rogers	Maywood					
1954	Evelyn Orowitz	Collingswood	20		Semi-finalist		Sister of Actor Michael Landon
1953	Susan Ruth Harris	Haddonfield					
1952	Ruth Jane Hampton	Merchantville	20		Top 10		
