= Miss USA 1994 =

43rd Miss USA pageant

- Date: February 11, 1994
- Presenters: Bob Goen; Arthel Neville; Laura Harring
- Entertainment: Doug Stone
- Venue: South Padre Island, Texas
- Broadcaster: CBS, KGBT-TV
- Winner: Lu Parker; South Carolina

Miss USA 1994 was the 43rd Miss USA pageant, televised live from the South Padre Island Convention Centre on South Padre Island, Texas on February 11, 1994. At the conclusion of the final competition, Lu Parker of South Carolina was crowned by outgoing titleholder Kenya Moore of Michigan.

The pageant was hosted by Bob Goen for the first of three years, replacing Dick Clark, with color commentary by Arthel Neville and a special guest appearance by Laura Harring, Miss USA 1985. Entertainment was provided by Doug Stone. During the live broadcast, the organizers of that year's Miss Universe pageant, which would be held in Manila, Philippines, were introduced during the show, along with that country's representative to said international competition, Charlene Gonzales, Binibining Pilipinas Universe 1994.

== Results ==
=== Placements ===
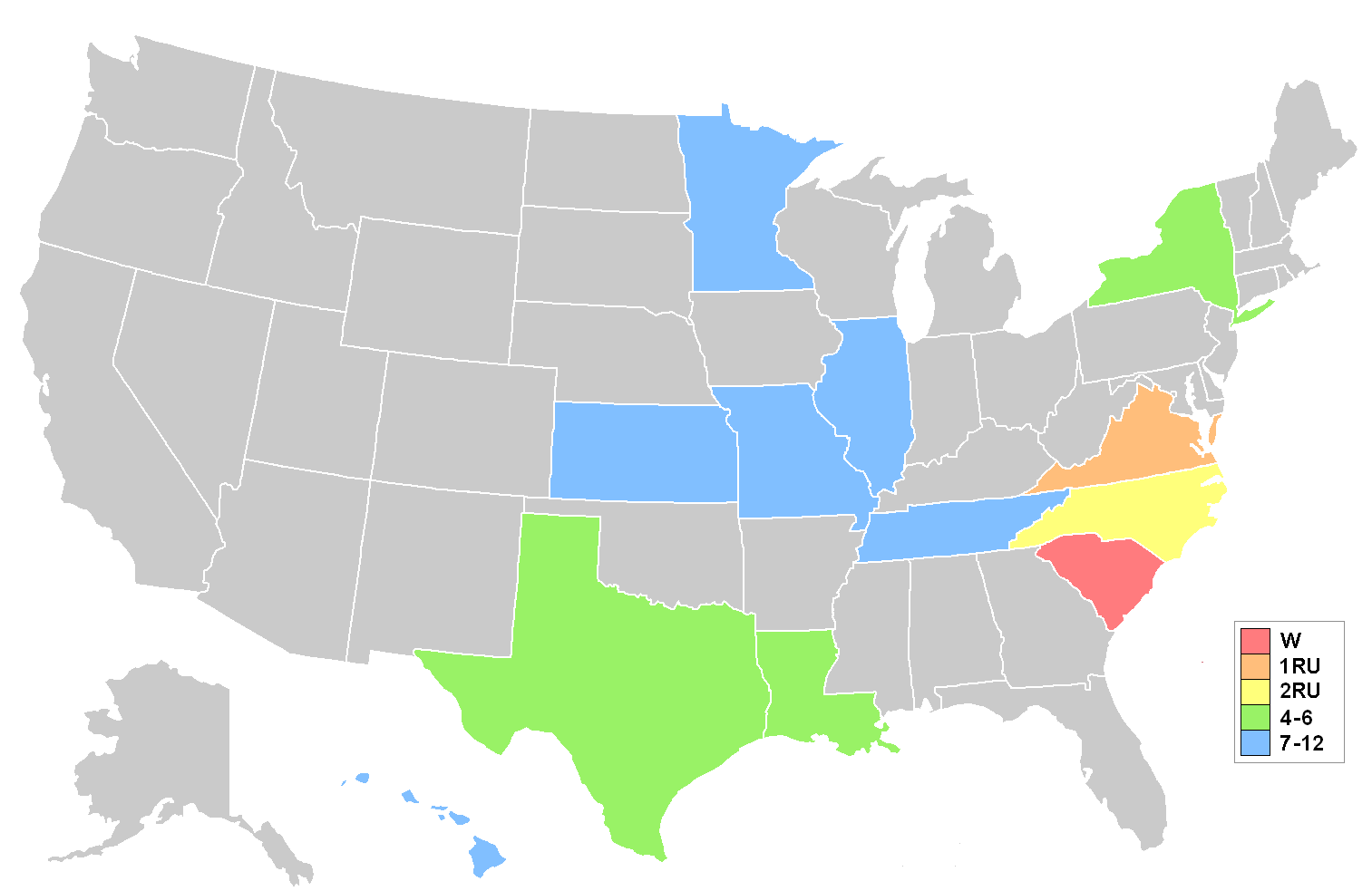
Map showing placements by state

Final results	Contestant
Miss USA 1994	South Carolina – Lu Parker
1st Runner-Up	Virginia – Patricia Southall
2nd Runner-Up	North Carolina – Lynn Jenkins
Top 6	Texas - Christine Friedel; Louisiana – Shirelle Hebert; New York – Jennifer Gareis
Top 12	(Georgia (U.S. state)) Georgia –Andrea Moore; Kansas – Carol Hovenkamp; Missouri – Shelly Lehman; Tennessee – Leah Hulan; Hawaii – Nadine Tañega; Illinois - Kathleen Farrell

== Host city ==
This was the first of three consecutive years that the pageant was held on South Padre Island. The announcement that the pageant would be held there was made on August 11, 1993.

Contestants arrived on January 27 for two weeks of events and preliminary competitions before the final telecast. This included a dinner event in Matamoros, Tamaulipas, Mexico, put on by the mayor and city officials, which became an issue when rebel activity on the United States-Mexican border led to fears for the contestants' safety. The city had contributed more than $100,000 to South Padre's bid to host the pageant, fundraising that was mirrored by other cities in the Rio Grande Valley.

== Delegates ==
The Miss USA 1994 delegates were:

- Alabama - Melaea Nelms
- Alaska - Dawn Stuvek
- Arizona - Jennifer Tisdale
- Arkansas - Hannah Hilliard
- California - Toay Foster
- Colorado - Kimberly Veldhuizen
- Connecticut - Mistrella Egan
- Delaware - Teresa Kline
- District of Columbia - Angela McGlowan
- Florida - Cynthia Redding
- Georgia - Andrea Moore
- Hawaii - Nadine Tanega
- Idaho - Trenna Wheeler
- Illinois - Kathleen Farrell
- Indiana - Kim Scull
- Iowa - Callie Pandit
- Kansas - Carol Hovenkamp
- Kentucky - Kim Buford
- Louisiana - Shirelle Hebert
- Maine - Colleen Brink
- Maryland - Wendy Davis
- Massachusetts - Michelle Atamian
- Michigan - Kelly Richelle Pawlowski
- Minnesota - Jolene Stavrakis
- Mississippi - Leslie Lynn Jetton
- Missouri - Shelly Lehman
- Montana - Kelly Brown
- Nebraska - Shawn Wolff
- Nevada - Angela Lambert
- New Hampshire - Kelly Zarse
- New Jersey - Rosa Velez
- New Mexico - Jill Vasquez
- New York - Jennifer Gareis
- North Carolina - Lynn Jenkins
- North Dakota - Amy Jane Lantz
- Ohio - Lisa Michelle Allison
- Oklahoma - Angela Parrick
- Oregon - Denise White
- Pennsylvania - Linda Chiaraluna
- Rhode Island - Raye Anne Johnson
- South Carolina - Lu Parker
- South Dakota - Tabitha Moude
- Tennessee - Leah Hulan
- Texas - Christine Friedel
- Utah - Vanessa Munns
- Vermont - Christy Beltrami
- Virginia - Patricia Southall
- Washington - Angel Ward
- West Virginia - Linda Bailey
- Wisconsin - Gina Desmond
- Wyoming - Tolan Clark
