= Miss USA 1991 =

40th Miss USA pageant

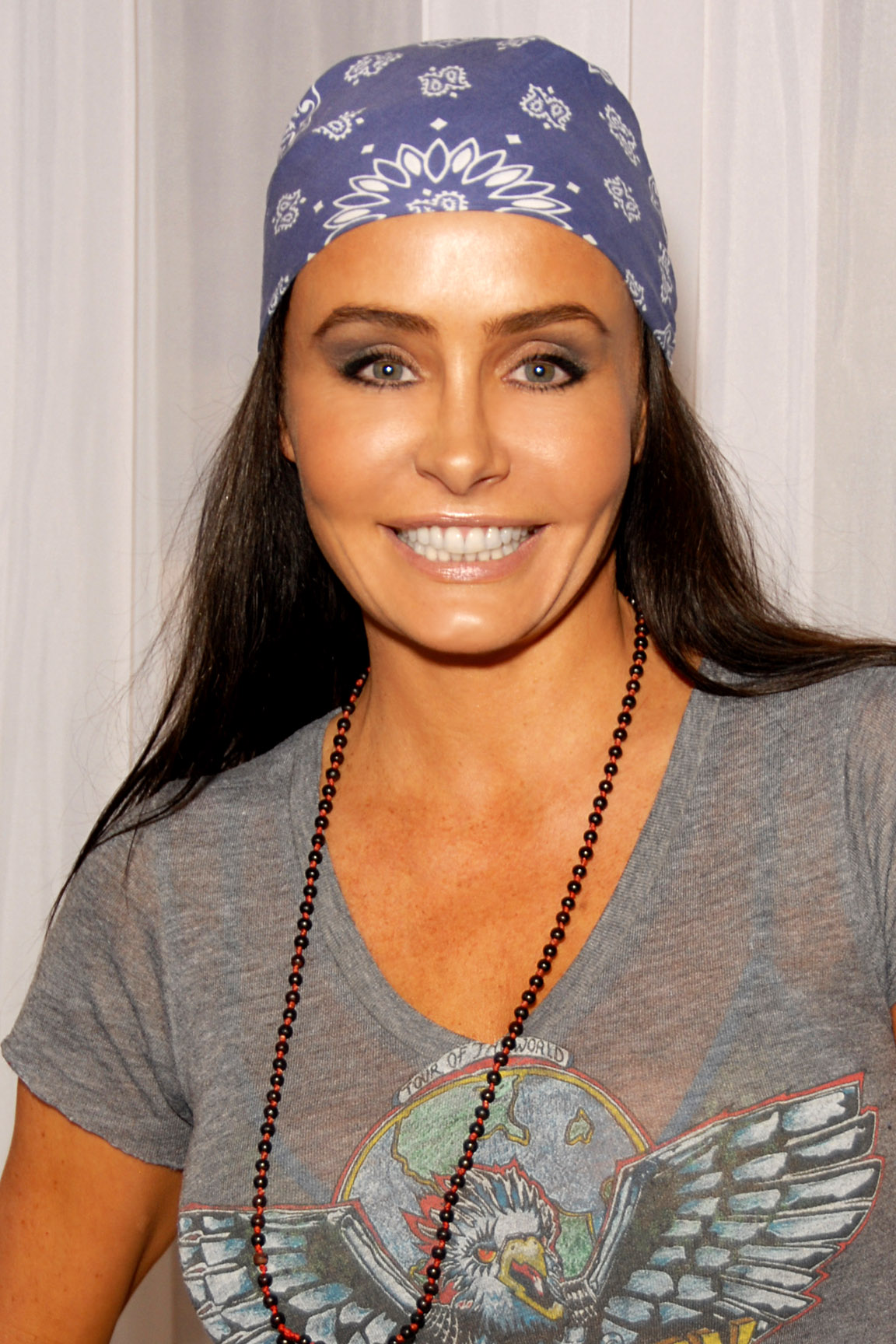
- Miss USA 1991 Kelli McCarty
- Date: February 22, 1991
- Presenters: Dick Clark; Barbara Eden; Deborah Shelton
- Venue: Century II Convention Center, Wichita, Kansas
- Broadcaster: CBS; KWCH-TV
- Entrants: 51
- Placements: 11
- Winner: Kelli McCarty; Kansas
- Congeniality: Charlotte Ray (New Jersey)
- Photogenic: Pat Arnold (North Carolina)

Miss USA 1991 was the 40th anniversary of the Miss USA pageant, televised live from the Century II Convention Center in Wichita, Kansas on February 22, 1991. At the conclusion of the final competition, Kelli McCarty of Kansas was crowned by outgoing titleholder Carole Gist of Michigan. McCarty became the first titleholder from Kansas and only the third winner to be crowned as Miss USA in her home state.

The pageant was hosted by Dick Clark for the third of five years, with color commentary by Barbara Eden for the only time, and Miss USA 1970 Deborah Shelton for the first time.

This was the second of four years that the pageant was held in Wichita, Kansas.

This year was the first time that the delegates were introduced region by region and one by one in the Parade of States. The regions are the Midwest, the South, the Northeast, the Northwest, and the Southwest.

This was also the last year that the 1st runner-up would go on to represent the US at Miss World, as the Miss World Organization from this point forward stopped accepting 1st runner-ups from Miss USA, due to the pageant not making a public announcement that the 1st runner-up was going to compete at Miss World. Starting in 1992, a separate pageant would be held to determine the US delegate for Miss World.

Miss USA 1991 titlecard

== Results ==
=== Placements ===
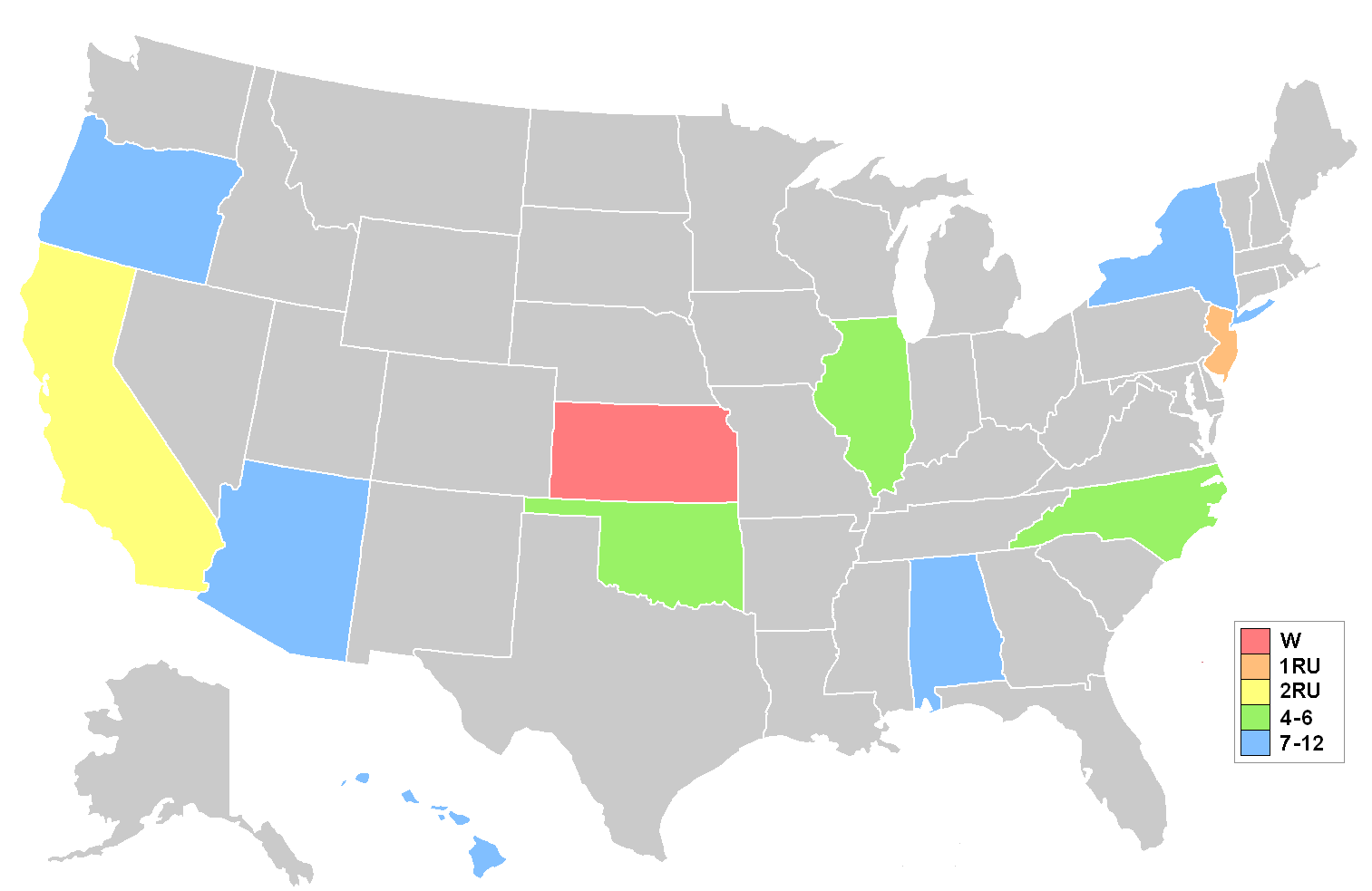
Map showing placements by state

Color keys

- The contestant Won in an International pageant.
- The contestant was a Runner-up in an International pageant.
- The contestant was a Semi-Finalist in an International pageant.
- The contestant assumed another title.
- The contestant was not able to compete in an International pageant.
- The contestant did not place but won a Special Award in the pageant.
- The contestant did not place.

Final results	Contestant	International pageant	International Results
Miss USA 1991	Kansas – Kelli McCarty	Miss Universe 1991	Top 6
1st Runner-Up	New Jersey – Charlotte Ray	Miss World 1991	Top 10
2nd Runner-Up	California – Diane Schock		
Top 6	Illinois – Lisa Morgan; North Carolina – Pat Arnold; Oklahoma -Julie Khoury		
Top 11	Alabama – Candy Carley; Arizona - Maricaroll Verlinde; Hawaii - Kym Lehua Digman; New York – Maureen Murray; Oregon – Olga Calderon		

=== Special awards ===
Award	Contestant
Miss Congeniality	New Jersey – Charlotte Ray
Miss Photogenic	North Carolina – Pat Arnold
Best State Costume	Arizona – Maricarroll Verlinde

== Delegates ==
The Miss USA 1991 delegates were:

- Alabama - Candice Carley
- Alaska - Tiffany Smith
- Arizona - Maricarroll Verlinde
- Arkansas - Angela Rockwell
- California - Diane Schock
- Colorado - Melanie Ness
- Connecticut - Valorie Abate
- Delaware - Laurie Lucidonio
- District of Columbia - LaKecia Smith
- Florida - Rosa Velilla
- Georgia - Tamara Rhodes
- Hawaii - Kym Lehua Digmon
- Idaho - Lori Easley
- Illinois - Lisa Morgan
- Indiana - Cathi Bennett
- Iowa - Heather Bowers
- Kansas - Kelli McCarty
- Kentucky - Susan Farris
- Louisiana - Melinda Murphy
- Maine - Melissa Oliver
- Maryland - Lisa Marie Lawson
- Massachusetts - Laura Wheeler
- Michigan - Leann Pothi
- Minnesota - April Herke
- Mississippi - Mitzi Swanson
- Missouri - Tiffany Hazell
- Montana - JoAnn Jorgensen
- Nebraska - Ziba Ayeen
- Nevada - Jodi Jensen
- New Hampshire - Adriana Molinari
- New Jersey - Charlotte Ray
- New Mexico - Tiffany Danton
- New York - Maureen Murray
- North Carolina - Pat Arnold
- North Dakota - Mischelle Chistensen
- Ohio - Amy Glaze
- Oklahoma - Julie Khoury
- Oregon - Olga Calderon
- Pennsylvania - Adrienne Romano
- Rhode Island - Lynda Michael
- South Carolina - Traci Rufty
- South Dakota - Jillayne Fossum
- Tennessee - Angela Johnson
- Texas - Chris Bogard
- Utah - Patti Jo Bender
- Vermont - Margaret Corey
- Virginia - Traci Dority
- Washington - LaNae Williams
- West Virginia - Krista Ransbottom
- Wisconsin - Kimberly Totdahl
- Wyoming - Wendy Lee Dunn

== Judges ==
- Adrienne Barbeau
- Don Crichton
- Lorianne Crook
- Guy Lee
- Sheila Manning
- Sharyn Skeeter
- Lynn Swann
- Joe Walsh

== See also ==
- Miss Teen USA 1991
