= Leeza Gibbons =

American broadcaster

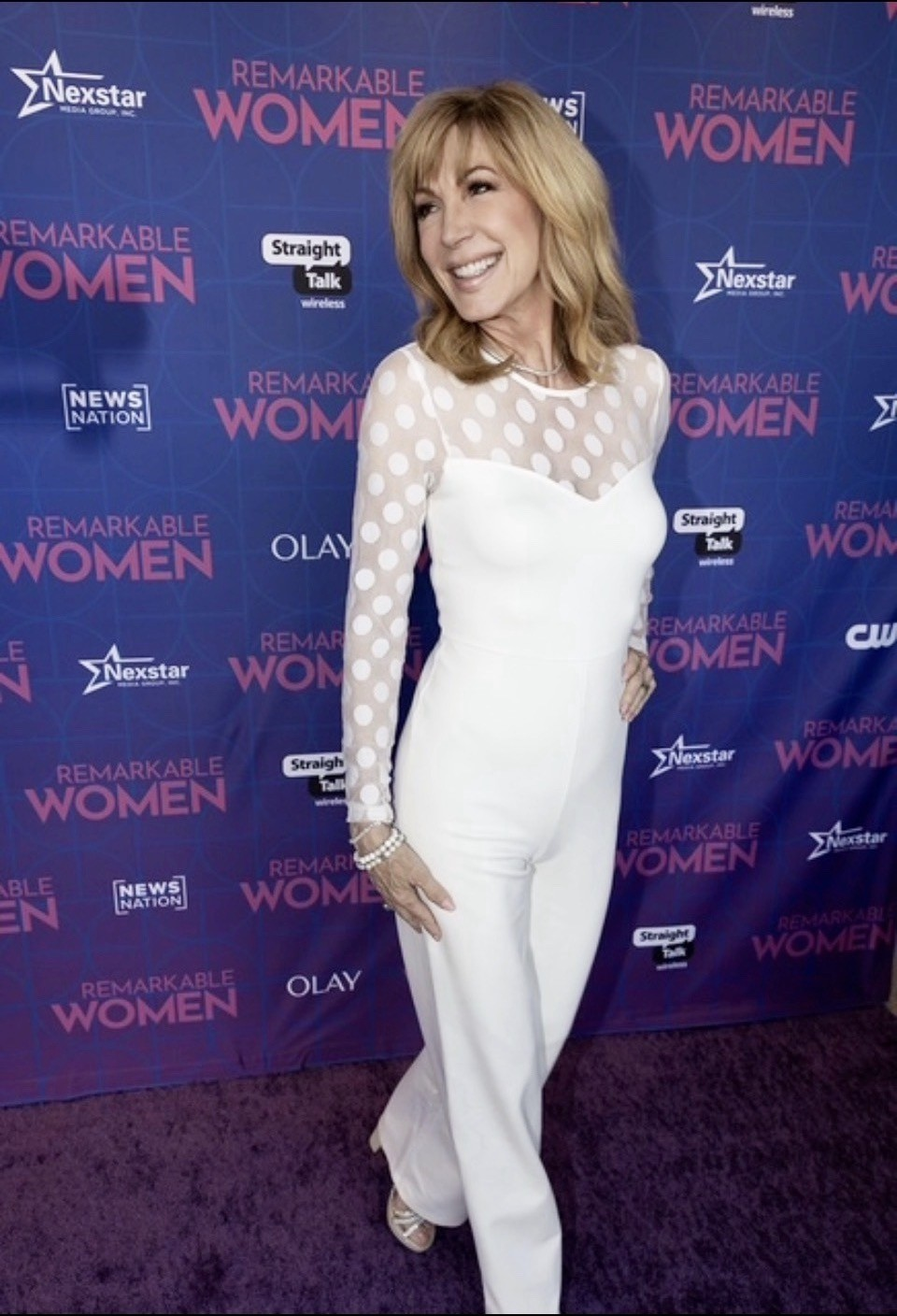
- Gibbons in 2025
- Born: Leeza Kim Gibbons; March 26, 1957 (age 69); Hartsville, South Carolina, U.S.
- Occupation: Broadcaster
- Years active: 1976–present
- Television: Leeza
- Spouses: John Hicks (m. 1980; div. 1982) Christopher Quinten (m. 1989; div. 1991) Stephen Meadows (m. 1991; div. 2005) Steven Fenton (m. 2011)
- Children: 3
- Website: leezagibbons.com

Leeza Kim Gibbons (born March 26, 1957) is an American talk show host. She is best known as a correspondent and co-host for Entertainment Tonight (1984–2000) as well as for having her own syndicated daytime talk show, Leeza (1993–2000). In 2013, her book Take 2 became a New York Times bestseller and she won the Daytime Emmy for Outstanding Host in a Lifestyle or Travel program for the PBS show, My Generation. On February 16, 2015, Gibbons was named the winner of The Celebrity Apprentice; while on the show she raised $714,000 for her charity Leeza's Care Connection.

== Biography ==
=== Early life ===
Leeza Gibbons was born in Hartsville, South Carolina, the daughter of Jean and Dr. Carlos Gibbons. Gibbons has two siblings – a brother, Carlos Jr., and a sister, Cammy. Leeza Gibbons grew up in Columbia, South Carolina in a housing subdivision called Whitehall, and graduated from Irmo High School. After completing high school, Gibbons graduated summa cum laude from the University of South Carolina's school of journalism and mass communication. She was a member of the Delta Delta Delta sorority at the university.

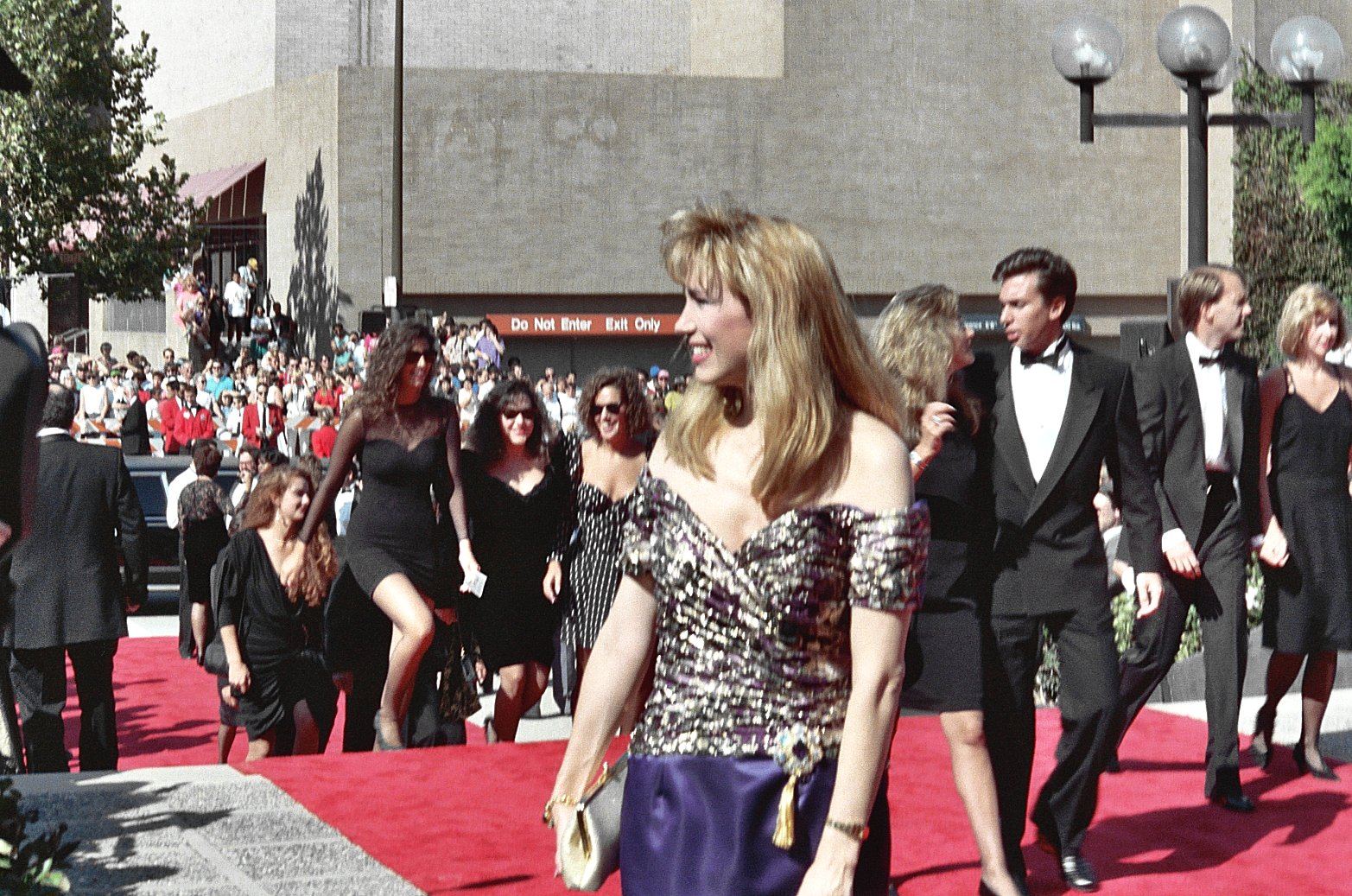
Leeza Gibbons, in 1990 at the Emmy Awards

=== Career ===
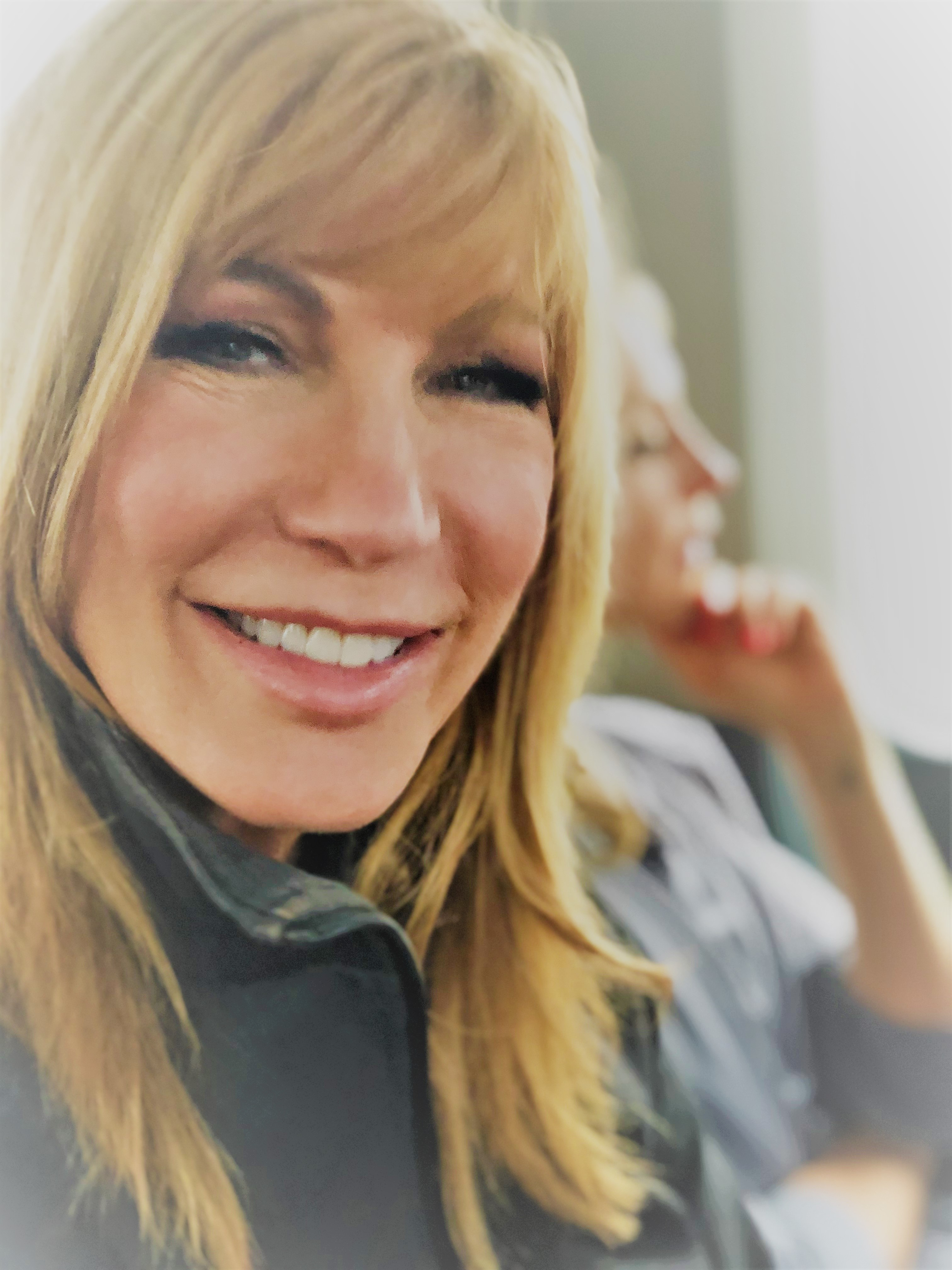

Gibbons's television career started in 1978 at WSPA-TV in Spartanburg, South Carolina. Then in the following year, she became the co-host of PM Magazine for KFDM-TV in Beaumont, Texas, and then moved to sister station WFAA-TV in Dallas. The new position represented a major career step and came with media attention.

In 1983, Gibbons joined WCBS-TV in New York City, where she became a host on 2 on the Town, a program modeled after PM Magazine. Her co-host was Robb Weller. The following year both of them joined Entertainment Tonight, with Gibbons as a reporter and co-anchor of the program's weekend edition.

In the early to mid-1990s, Gibbons partnered with Guthy-Renker, becoming a trailblazer in the world of direct response. She was the first television star on a daily show to be featured in an infomercial, as she starred in Personal Power 2 and Get the Edge with a young Tony Robbins.

Leeza was her own NBC/syndicated talk show; it ran from June 1993 to September 2000. The show originated as John & Leeza from Hollywood, with former Entertainment Tonight co-host John Tesh. Tesh was dropped from the show after seven months, and Gibbons was the host for the remainder of the series.

In the 1990s, Gibbons hosted the radio show Blockbuster Top 25 Countdown with Leeza Gibbons. She counted down the hits in Adult Contemporary and Hot Adult Contemporary formats, and presented entertainment news and pre-recorded interviews. When Blockbuster Video stopped sponsoring the program in 1999, the show's name was changed to Leeza Gibbons' Top 25 Countdown. In January 2001, the countdown was dropped and the show was renamed Leeza Gibbons' Hollywood Confidential; the show continued until 2013.

In 1998, Gibbons received the Congressional Horizon Award (1998) for her work on children's issues.

In the early 2000s, she launched her mineral makeup line, Sheer Cover Studio, with Guthy-Renker. Sheer Cover continues to be sold around the world.

From 2001 to 2003, Gibbons was the host and managing editor of the television show Extra.

In 2005, she received the Public Leadership in Neurology Award from the American Academy of Neurology for raising awareness about Alzheimer's disease.

On November 14, 2007, California Governor Arnold Schwarzenegger announced the appointment of Gibbons to the board that oversees California's stem cell research agency, filling a slot designated for a patient advocate for Alzheimer's. Her nonprofit group, Leeza's Place, is aimed at caregivers for persons with memory disorders. Her efforts to raise attention for memory disorders grew out of her own family's experience with her mother, who was diagnosed with Alzheimer's disease and died in May 2008.

She replaced Meredith Vieira for a week of Who Wants to Be a Millionaire shows on June 23–27, 2008.

In May 2009 Gibbons' new book, Take Your Oxygen First: Protecting Your Health and Happiness While Caring for a Loved One with Memory Loss, told the story of Leeza's family's personal struggle with Alzheimer's disease after her mother's diagnosis.

Beginning in 2011, she was the host of the PBS talk show My Generation (2011–2014) and co-host and executive producer of the syndicated news magazine show America Now (2011–2015).

In 2013, Gibbons won a Daytime Emmy Award for Outstanding Lifestyle/Travel Host for the PBS series My Generation. In 2015, she won the NBC reality game-show series Celebrity Apprentice.

She began co-hosting the Rose Parade on January 2, 2017. In 2015, Gibbons received the Icon award from the Electronic Retailing Association, where it was announced that Gibbons had crossed the $1 billion mark in sales. Her partnership with Guthy-Renker is the longest studio/talent relationship in infomercial history.

=== Personal life ===
Gibbons has been married four times; she was married to John Hicks from 1980 to 1982. From 1989 to 1991, she was married to British actor Christopher Quinten, whom she met when they both participated in the 1988 New Zealand Telethon. She and Quinten have a daughter, Jordan Alexandra (Lexi) Gibbons. Leeza Gibbons was married to actor Stephen Meadows from 1991 to 2005, and they have two sons, Troy and Nathan Daniel. In 2011, she married New York Times best-selling author Steven Fenton in Beverly Hills. Fenton is the son of Frank M. Fenton, a former mayor of Beverly Hills, California.

Gibbons is a member of Hollywood United Methodist Church, and all of her children were baptized there.

Her grandmother and mother have been diagnosed with Alzheimer's disease.

Media offices
Preceded by Emma Samms and Karen Baldwin	Miss Universe color commentator (with Margaret Gardiner); 1990 (with Angela Visser); 1991–1992	Succeeded by Cecilia Bolocco and Angela Visser
Preceded by Angie Dickinson	Miss USA color commentator (with Laura Harring); 1990	Succeeded by Barbara Eden and Debbie Shelton
Preceded by Terry Murphy and Deborah Shelton	Miss USA color commentator (with Courtney Gibbs); 1993	Succeeded by Arthel Neville and Laura Harring
Preceded by Marcia Strassman	Miss Teen USA color commentator (with Kelly Hu); 1990–1991 (with Bridgette Wilson); 1992	Succeeded by Arthel Neville and Kelly Hu
