= Janaye Ingram =

American beauty queen and political organizer

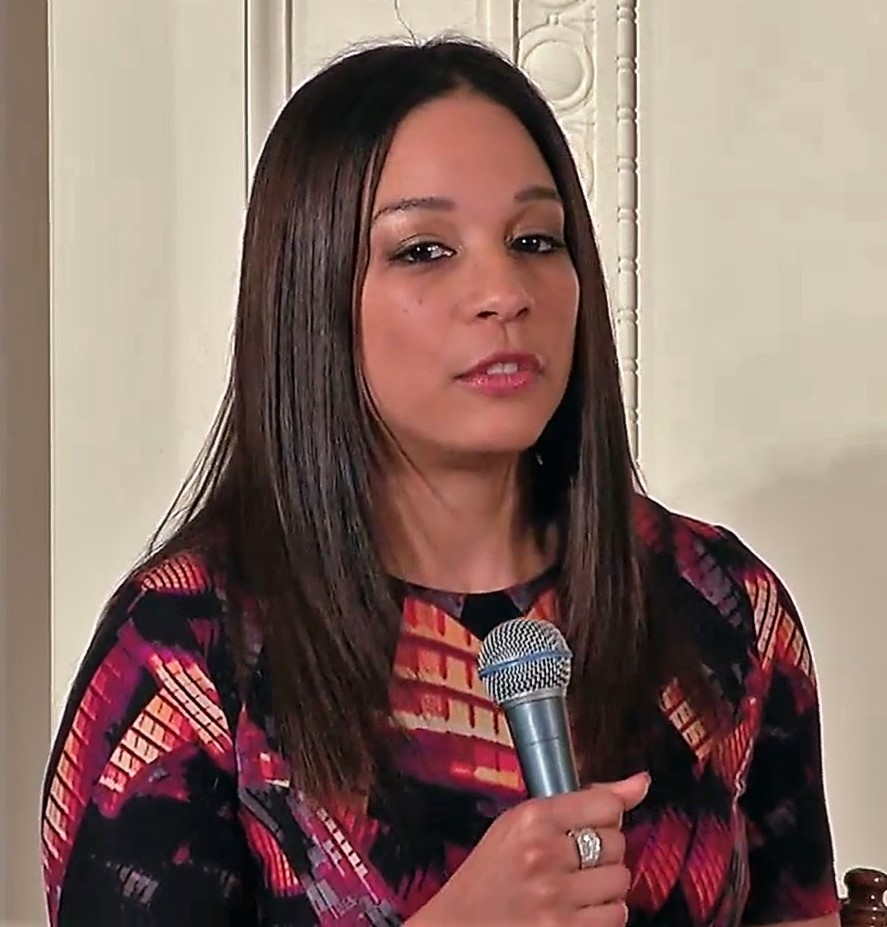
- Ingram speaks at the White House in 2015
- Born: Janaye Michelle Ingram; Camden, New Jersey, U.S.
- Height: 5 ft 8 in (1.73 m)
- Beauty pageant titleholder
- Title: Miss New Jersey USA 2004
- Hair color: Dark Brown
- Eye color: Brown
- Major competition: Miss USA 2004

Janaye Michelle Ingram is a political organizer from Cherry Hill, New Jersey.

== Biography ==
Ingram was crowned Miss New Jersey USA 2004 in Jersey City, New Jersey in late 2003. She later represented New Jersey in the Miss USA 2004 pageant held in Los Angeles, California in April 2004 where she went unplaced.

She is originally from Camden, New Jersey, but later moved to Cherry Hill. Ingram's family is well known in Camden. Her father and his siblings are musicians who worked closely with The Sound of Philadelphia. Her paternal aunt is Barbara Ingram.

She graduated from Clark Atlanta University with a B.A. in Psychology where she was initiated into the Alpha Pi chapter of Alpha Kappa Alpha sorority. Ingram later went on to pursue a Master's of Science in Nonprofit Management at The New School's Milano School of International Affairs, Management, and Urban Policy.

Ingram's career took an unexpected transition when she began to write about various topics online specifically focusing on motherhood as a woman of color. In 2020, Ingram became unexpectedly pregnant with her daughter and carried to full term birthing her first child as a single mother in the middle of a pandemic.

Ingram has worked with organizations across the country to empower underserved populations and has received numerous awards and recognition for her efforts. In 2013, Ingram was promoted from her position as Washington, D.C. bureau chief to be national executive director of National Action Network, founded and led by Rev. Al Sharpton. She is also board member for the Women in Entertainment Empowerment Network (WEEN) and started a scholarship campaign for children and youth in impoverished communities called Ambassadors of Hope. In 2017, she became known as Head of Logistics for the Women's March, which was the largest single-day protest in U.S. history.

== Selected publications ==
- Ingram, Janaye (2016). "Teachers: Let's Have A Moment Of Honesty". News One. Interactive One, LLC.
- Ingram, Janaye (2015). "#SayHerName: Forgotten & Ignored". News One. Interactive One, LLC.

== Video ==
Appearances on C-SPAN

Preceded by Vanessa Baker	Miss New Jersey USA; 2004	Succeeded by Sylvia Pogorzelski
