= Courtney Gibbs =

American beauty queen and actress (born 1966)

Courtney Mokarow
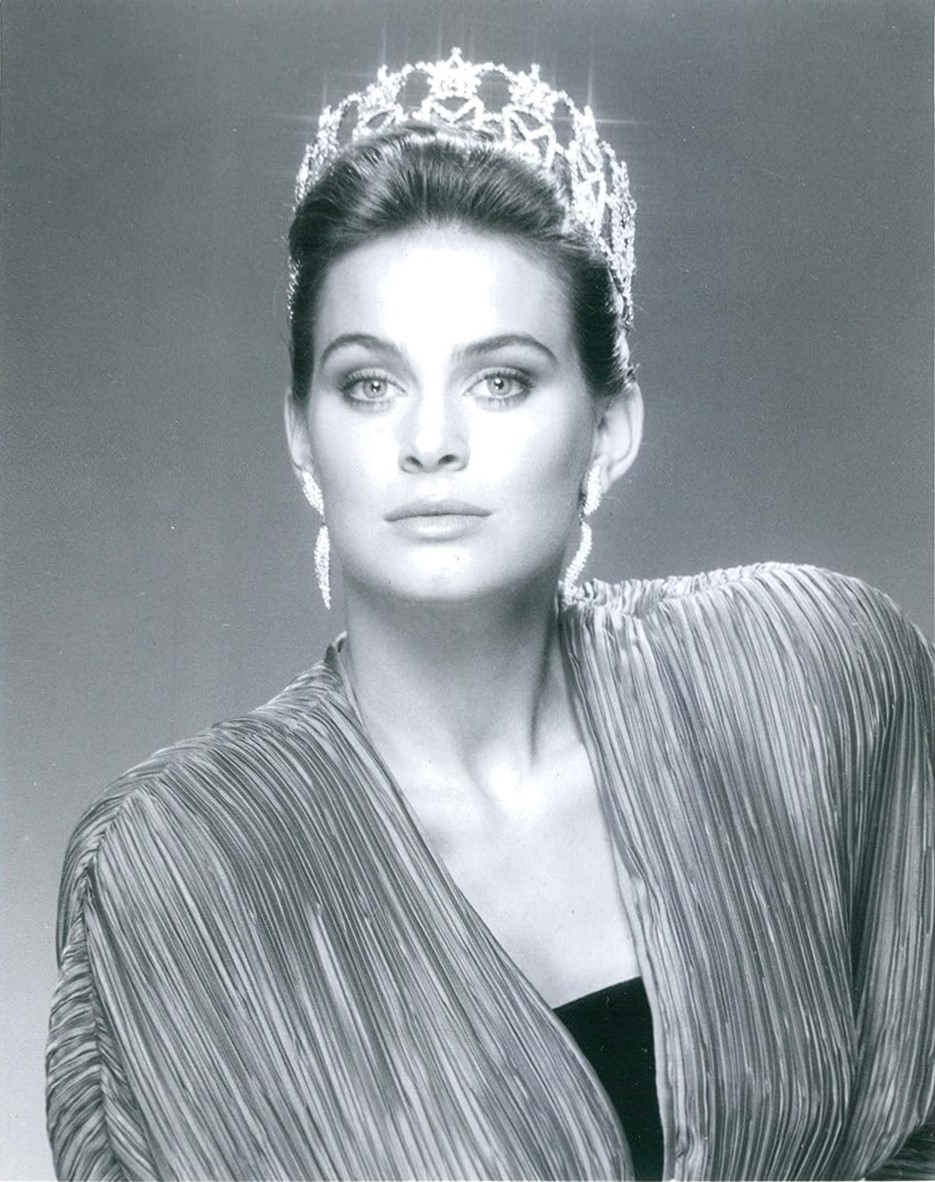
- Gibbs as Miss USA 1988
- Born: Courtney Ann Gibbs; August 20, 1966 (age 60)
- Other names: Courtney Gibbs-Mokarow; Courtney Gibbs-Eplin; Courtney Gibbs
- Height: 1.75 m (5 ft 9 in)
- Spouses: Tom Eplin (m. 1991–1995); Kevin Mokarow (m. 1999)
- Children: 2
- Beauty pageant titleholder
- Title: Miss Texas USA 1988; Miss USA 1988
- Hair color: Brown
- Eye color: Blue
- Major competitions: Miss Texas USA 1988; (Winner); Miss USA 1988; (Winner); Miss Universe 1988; (Top 10)

Courtney Ann Gibbs-Mokarow (née Gibbs; born August 20, 1966) is an American actress, model and beauty pageant titleholder who won Miss USA 1988 and Top 10 semifinalist at Miss Universe 1988.

== Miss USA ==
Born to Charles Gaylord Gibbs and Susan Eckardt-Gibbs, Mokarow participated in the 1988 Miss USA pageant as Miss Texas USA, winning the title and becoming the fourth of five consecutive winners from Texas during the 1980s.

At the 1988 Miss Universe pageant, she placed first in the preliminary competition, ninth in semifinal interview, eighth in swimsuit and sixth in evening gown, finishing her participation in eighth place. Her national costume was a cowgirl.

== Life after Miss USA ==
Following her pageantry career, Mokarow married former Another World star Tom Eplin and went into acting, portraying Assistant District Attorney Galen Henderson on All My Children for a brief time in 1992.

In 1999, she married husband Kevin, a Dallas businessman, with whom she has one son, Grayson, and one daughter, Evelyn.

== Filmography ==
Year	Title	Role	Notes
	All My Children	Galen Henderson	
1989	The Super Mario Bros. Super Show!	Luigi's Girlfriend	
1990	Joe Versus the Volcano	Saleswoman	
1991	DEA	Chaya	
1992	The Naked Truth	Misty Blue / Joanne	

Awards and achievements
Preceded by Michelle Royer	Miss Texas USA; 1988	Succeeded by Gretchen Polhemus
Media offices
Preceded by Terry Murphy and Deborah Shelton	Miss USA color commentator (with Leeza Gibbons); 1993	Succeeded by Arthel Neville and Laura Harring
