= Aslıhan Koruyan Sabancı =

Turkish beauty pageant titleholder (born 1972)

- Born: Dilek Aslıhan Koruyan; 1972 (age 53–54); Ankara, Turkey
- Education: Texas A&M; Cornell University and SDA Bocconi School of Management
- Spouse: Demir Sabancı
- Culinary career
- Cooking style: Mediterranean, international, gluten-free and healthy diet

Aslıhan Koruyan Sabancı, née Dilek Aslıhan Koruyan (born c. 1972) is a Turkish chef, author and beauty pageant titleholder who won Miss Turkey 1991. She specializes in healthy and creative recipes. She represented her country at Miss World 1991.

== Personal life ==
Aslihan Koruyan Sabanci was born in Ankara, Turkey.
As a child, Aslihan developed an interest in cooking and was encouraged by her family to experiment with different culinary projects.
In 2002, Aslihan married Demir Sabanci. They have three children together.

== Career ==
Present
Aslihan chef and author, internationally recognized for her healthy recipes designed for everyday life. Her published works focus on a healthy, gluten free Mediterranean diet, and her upcoming books expand into other natural, nutritious recipes.

=== Miss World ===
Aslihan won the title of Miss Turkey in 1991 and represented Turkey in the 41st Miss World Beauty Pageant on December 21,1991 in Atlanta, Georgia, finishing in the top ten semifinalist, also winning title ‘European Queen of Beauty.'

=== Education and early career ===
In 1996, Aslihan graduated from Texas A&M University, where she studied economics. After university, Aslihan moved to Milan to pursue a joint MBA from Cornell University, United States and the SDA Bocconi University, Italy. She started her career at 1998 at Johnson & Johnson Family of Companies, Medical Devices and Diagnostics in New Jersey, US. Between 1998 and 2002, she held different managerial positions at Ethicon Inc. and Ethicon Endo-Surgery Inc. in New York, New Jersey, and Istanbul.
She joined Sedes Holding in 2002 as a founding shareholder and currently serves as a Vice Chairman of the board of directors.
Aslihan also holds Master certificates in the Essentials of Hospitality Management, Foodservice Management, Hospitality Marketing and a Certificate in Plant Based Nutrition from Cornell University, New York, US.

=== Publications ===
Following her diagnosis with food sensitivity, she began to adapt the traditional Turkish recipes passed down from her grandmother and mother, as well as the international recipes that she learned in her studies, to fit within a gluten-free diet. In 2011, Aslihan published the first book of healthy, all natural gluten-free recipes in Turkey, titled Gluten Free Mediterranean Gourmet Cuisine. Her book has been well-received from critics in Turkey, including those from Hello!, Time Out, NTV Bloomberg and Milliyet. Her book won the Gourmand World Cookbook Award for ‘Best Health and Nutrition Book in the World at the 17th International Gourmand World Cookbook Awards, Paris March 7, 2012.
