= Miss USA 1988 =

37th Miss USA pageant

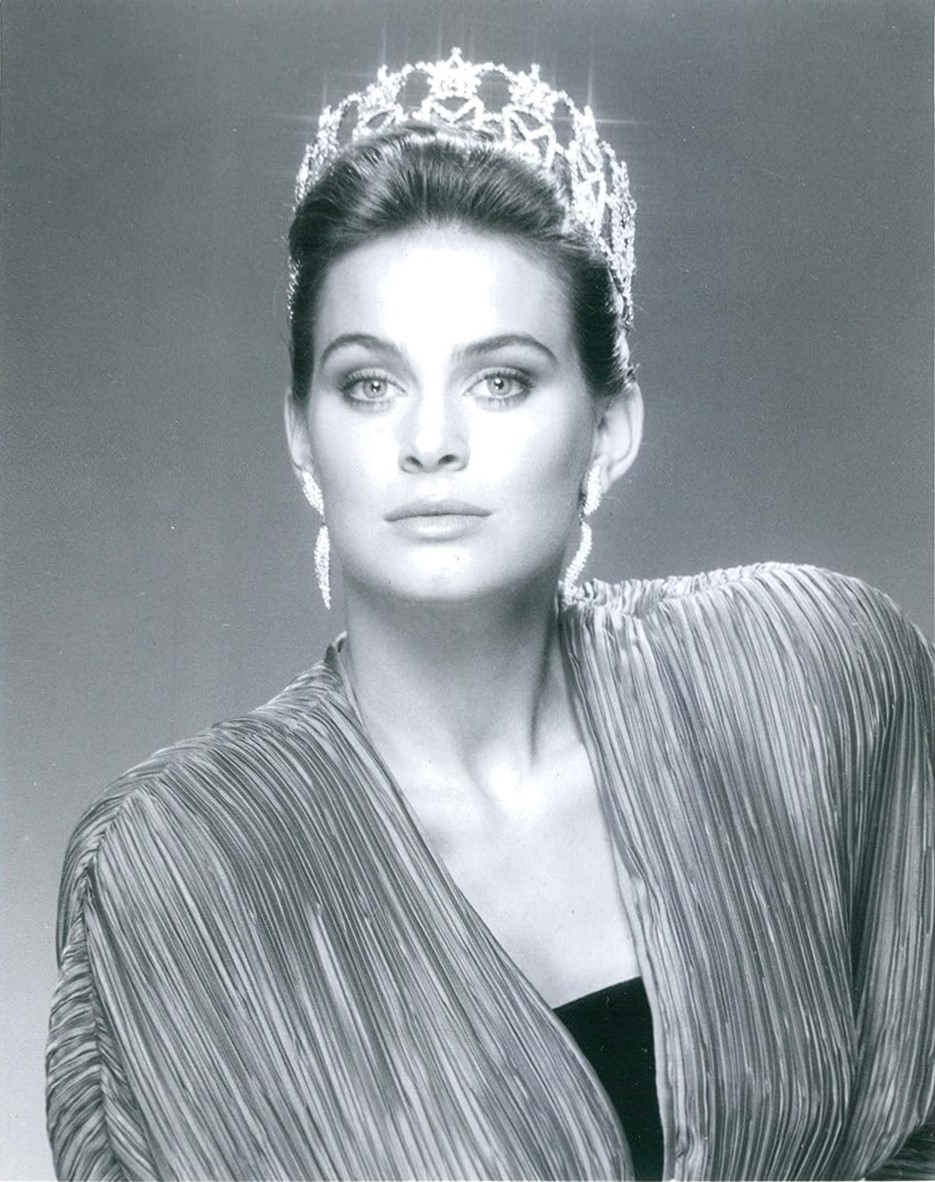
- Courtney Gibbs, wearing Miss USA 1988 crown
- Date: March 1, 1988
- Presenters: Alan Thicke; Tracy Scoggins
- Venue: El Paso Convention And Performing Art Center (Abraham Chavez Theater), El Paso, Texas
- Broadcaster: CBS, KDBC-TV
- Entrants: 51
- Placements: 10
- Winner: Courtney Gibbs; Texas
- Congeniality: Elva Anderson (District of Columbia)
- Best State Costume: Lagracella Omran (Nevada)
- Photogenic: Rowanne Brewer (Maryland)

Miss USA 1988 was the 37th Miss USA pageant, televised live from the El Paso Civic Center in El Paso, Texas on March 1, 1988. At the conclusion of the final competition, Courtney Gibbs of Texas was crowned Miss USA, becoming the fourth consecutive winner from Texas.

Miss USA 1988 opening titles

The pageant was hosted by Growing Pains star Alan Thicke, the first time in twenty years that Bob Barker did not host, and the pageant commentator was Tracy Scoggins. Barker, an animal rights activist, refused to be involved because one of the winner's prizes was a fur coat. There had been controversy surrounding the fur coats since the previous year, and Barker claimed he had asked pageant officials not to give away coats for years but that he had been ignored. Other animal rights activists threatened to picket the pageant in protest at its fur policy and disrupted a pre-pageant press conference. In an unrelated attack, Scoggins was attacked in an elevator following pageant rehearsals. The attacker was charged with attempted sexual assault.

This was the first time that the pageant was held in Texas and the only time it was ever held in El Paso. El Paso had hosted the Miss Teen USA 1987 pageant the previous year, and it was announced in November 1987 that the city would likely host Miss USA 1988.

== Results ==
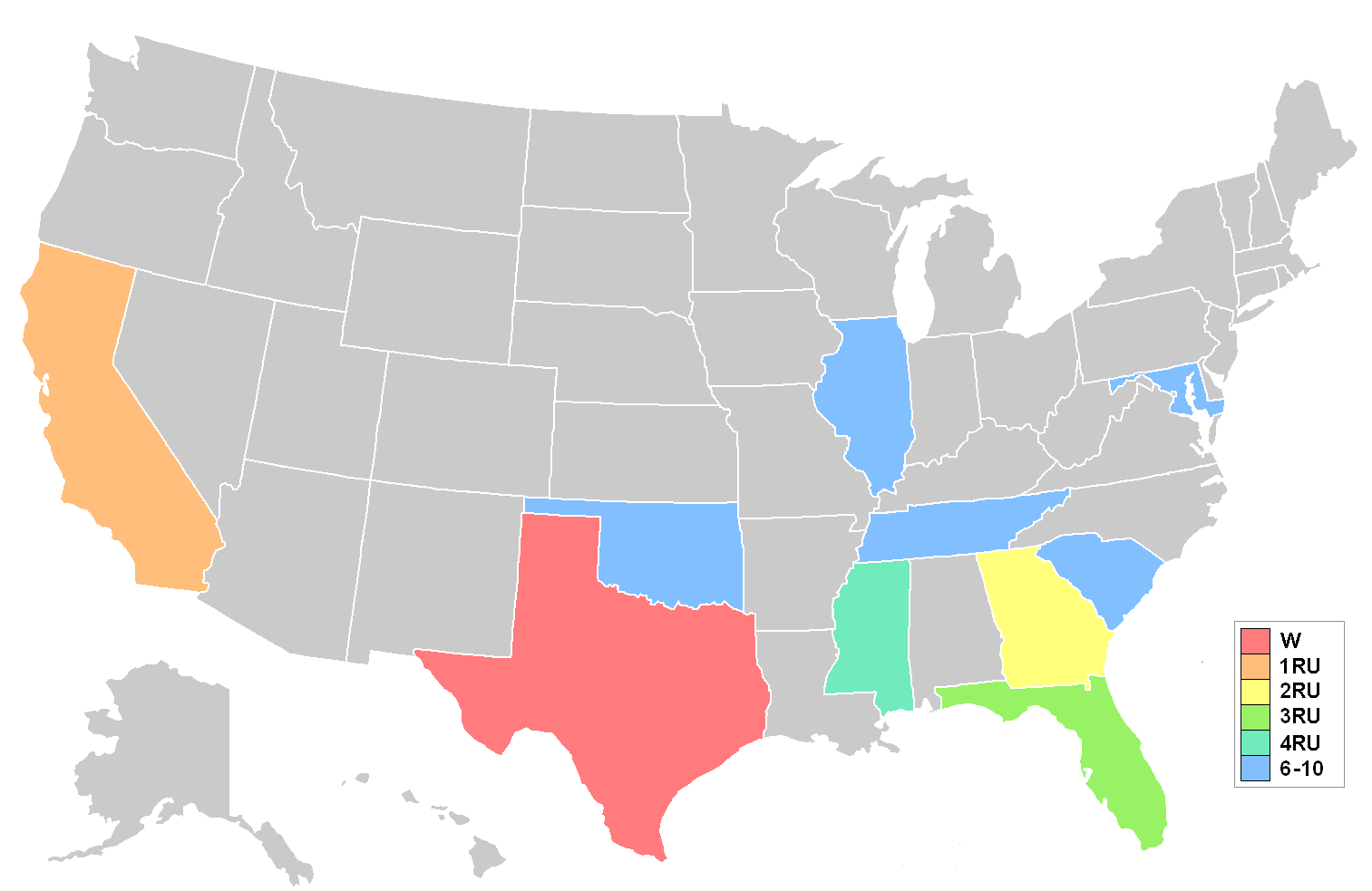
Map showing placements by state

=== Placements ===
Final results	Contestant
Miss USA 1988	Texas - Courtney Gibbs
1st Runner-Up	California - Diana Magaña
2nd Runner-Up	(Georgia (U.S. state)) Georgia - Donna Rampy
3rd Runner-Up	Florida - Monica Farrell
4th Runner-Up	Mississippi - Dana Richmond
Top 10	Oklahoma - Tamara Walker; Illinois - Gina Zordani; Tennessee - Stephanie Jane Potts; Maryland - Rowanne Brewer; South Carolina - April Abel

=== Special awards ===
Award	Contestant
Miss Photogenic	Rowanne Brewer (Maryland)

== Delegates ==
The Miss USA 1988 delegates were:

- Alabama - Rhonda Mooney
- Alaska - Raun Reaves
- Arizona - Kris Keim
- Arkansas - Melissa Staples
- California - Diana Magaña
- Colorado - Nicola Svaldi
- Connecticut - Catherine Galasso
- Delaware - Christina Angel
- District of Columbia - Elva Anderson
- Florida - Monica Farrell
- Georgia - Donna Rampy
- Hawaii - Paula Prevost
- Idaho - Kay Kinsey
- Illinois - Gina Zordani
- Indiana - Loetta Earnest
- Iowa - Jule Kemmerling
- Kansas - Cynthia Decker
- Kentucky - Suzanne Pitman
- Louisiana - Rhonda Vinson
- Maine - Suzanne Grenier
- Maryland - Rowanne Brewer
- Massachusetts - Anita Lovely
- Michigan - Anthonia Dotson
- Minnesota - Julie Nelson
- Mississippi - Dana Richmond
- Missouri - Alecia Workman
- Montana - Kimberly Torp
- Nebraska - Kellie O'Neil
- Nevada - Lagracella Omran
- New Hampshire - Diane Wright
- New Jersey - Colleen Carlone
- New Mexico - Stephanie Storrie
- New York - Linnea Mancini
- North Carolina - Tammy Tolar
- North Dakota - Kate Sevde
- Ohio - Gina West
- Oklahoma - Tamara Walker
- Oregon - Elaine Rohrer
- Pennsylvania - Susan Gray
- Rhode Island - Cindy Geronda
- South Carolina - April Abel
- South Dakota - Sandi Fix
- Tennessee - Stephanie Jane Potts
- Texas - Courtney Gibbs
- Utah - Suzie Lundell
- Vermont - Stacy Sisson
- Virginia - Denise Smith
- Washington - Sandra Kord
- West Virginia - Cathy Fowler
- Wisconsin - Mary Kay Anderson
- Wyoming - Kristen Youmans

== Contestant notes ==
- Two contestants had previously competed in the Miss Teen USA pageant. They were Kris Keim (Arizona), who was Miss Arizona Teen USA 1983, and Melissa Staples (Arkansas), who was Miss Arkansas Teen USA 1984
- Two contestants had previously competed in the Miss America 1986 pageant. They were Mary Kay Anderson (Wisconsin), formerly Miss Wisconsin 1985 and Monica Farrell (Florida), formerly Miss Florida 1985.
- Prior to the pageant Suzanne Pitman (Kentucky) was arrested on a drunk-driving charge but allowed to compete in the pageant.
- Miss Minnesota USA winner Sue Bolich resigned her title one week after she was arrested for shoplifting. The other pageant contestants were already in El Paso at the time of her resignation, and first runner-up Jolene Stavrakis was to be sent in Bolich's place. However, Stavrakis also had a previous shoplifting charge on her record, and she too withdrew from the pageant. Julie Nelson, second runner-up in the state pageant, assumed the title and represented Minnesota at Miss USA.

== Judges ==
- Jennifer Ashe
- Mary Kay Ash
- Michele Butin
- Chico DeBarge
- Gil Gerard
- Albert Hague
- Michael K. Herbert
- Renee Orin
- Stanley Platos
- Pam Roberts
- Sharlene Wells Hawkes
