= Tom Eplin =

American actor

- Born: Thomas M. Eplin; October 25, 1960 (age 65); Hayward, California, U.S.
- Occupation: Actor
- Years active: 1982–2007
- Spouses: Ellen Wheeler (m. 1985; div. 1988) Courtney Gibbs (m. 1991; div. 1995) Abilene Crabtree (m. 2015; div. 2020)
- Children: 2

Tom Eplin (born October 25, 1960, in Hayward, California) is an American actor known for his run as the character of Jake McKinnon on two soap operas for a combined total of nearly two decades: on Another World (1985–1986, 1988–1999) and on As the World Turns (1999–2002).

Eplin was married to his Another World costar Ellen Wheeler from 1985 to 1988. His second marriage was to Courtney Gibbs from 1991 to 1995. Both marriages ended in divorce. In 2011, he welcomed a daughter with his third wife Abilene Crabtree, whom he married on June 20, 2015, in Danville, California. They welcomed a second daughter in September 2016 and divorced February 2020.

== Filmography ==
Year	Title	Role	Notes
1982	The Beach Girls	Crewman	
1985	The Facts of Life	George	
1985	Sunset Strip	Mark Jefferson	
1987	Delta Fever	Nick	
1985–86, 1988–99	Another World	Jake McKinnon	
1999-2002	As the World Turns	Jake McKinnon	
