= Miss USA 1993 =

42nd Miss USA pageant

- Date: February 19, 1993
- Presenters: Dick Clark; Leeza Gibbons; Courtney Gibbs
- Venue: Century II Convention Center, Wichita, Kansas
- Broadcaster: CBS, KWCH-TV
- Entrants: 51
- Placements: 12
- Winner: Kenya Moore; Michigan
- Congeniality: Stacey Blaine (Massachusetts)
- Photogenic: Kelly Hu (Hawaii)

Miss USA 1993 was the 42nd Miss USA pageant, televised live from the Century II Convention Center in Wichita, Kansas on February 19, 1993. At the conclusion of the final competition, Kenya Moore of Michigan was crowned by outgoing titleholder Shannon Marketic of California. Moore became the second Miss USA titleholder from Michigan and the second African-American winner ever. The pageant was held in Wichita, Kansas, for the fourth and last consecutive year, and was hosted by Dick Clark for the final time, with color commentary by Leeza Gibbons (also for the final time) and Courtney Gibbs, Miss USA 1988.

This was also the last time the State Costume competition took place and would not return until twenty-eight years later in 2021, under a different organization.

== Results ==
=== Placements ===
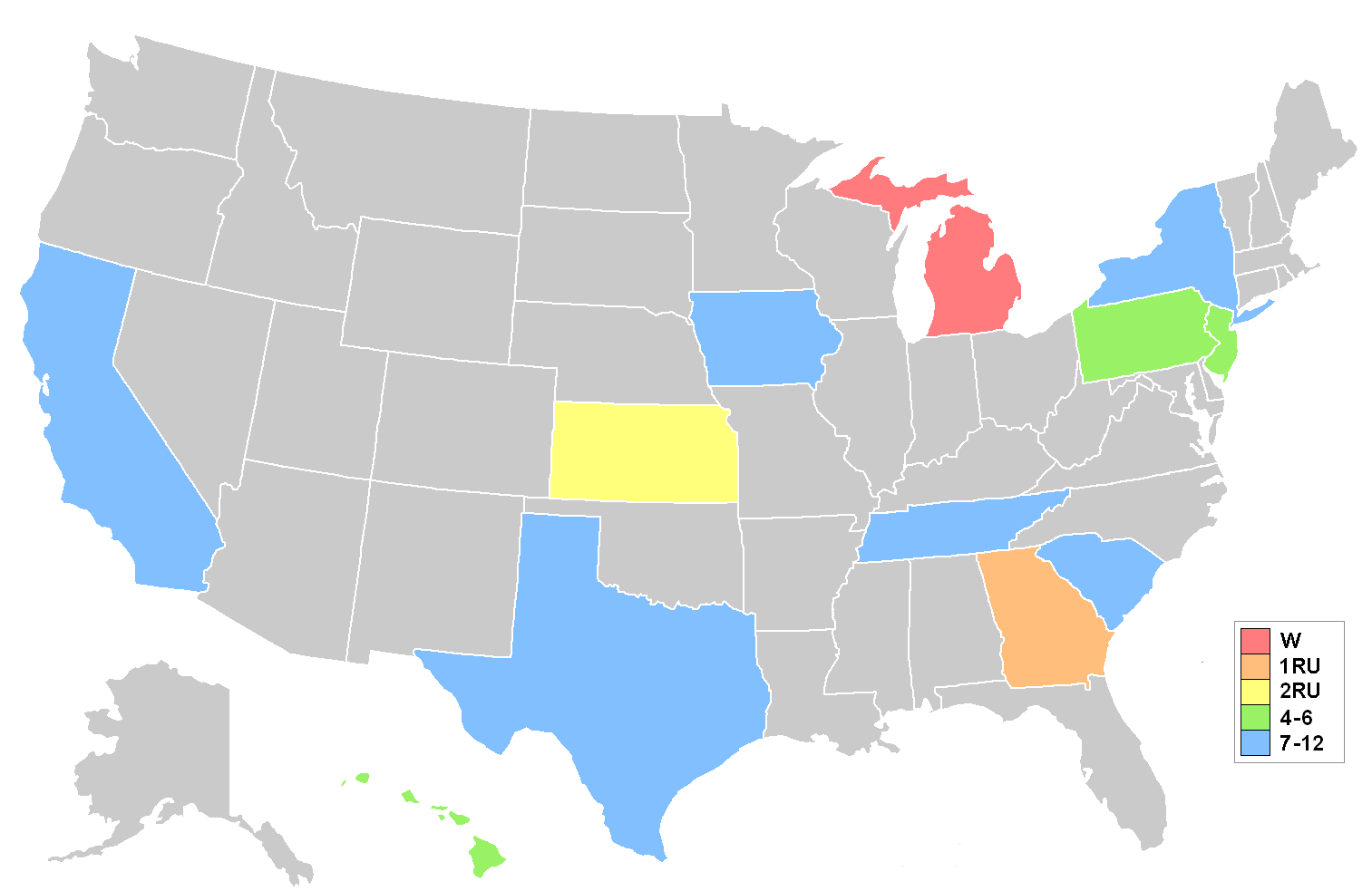
Map showing placements by state

Final results	Contestant
Miss USA 1993	Michigan – Kenya Moore
1st Runner-Up	(Georgia (U.S. state)) Georgia – Erin Nance
2nd Runner-Up	Kansas – Tavia Shackles
Top 6	Hawaii – Kelly Hu; New Jersey – Amy Fissel; Pennsylvania – Kimmarie Johnson
Top 12	California – Jane Olvera; Iowa – Jan Hoyer; (New York (state)) New York – Wendy Mock; South Carolina – Kelli Gosnell; Tennessee – Cammy Gregory †; Texas – Angie Sisk

=== Special awards ===
Award	Contestant
Miss Congeniality	Massachusetts – Stacey Blaine
Miss Photogenic	Hawaii – Kelly Hu
Best State Costume	Kansas – Tavia Shackles
Most Beautiful Eyes	Kansas – Tavia Shackles
Best in Swimsuit	(Georgia (U.S. state)) Georgia – Erin Nance

== Delegates ==
The Miss USA 1993 delegates were :

State	Candidate	Age	Hometown	Regional Group
Alabama	Toni Johnson	22	Montgomery	South
Alaska	Teresa Gates	23	Anchorage	Northwest
Arizona	Apryl Hettich		Scottsdale	Southwest
Arkansas	Kati Fish		Hot Springs	South
California	Jane Olvera	23	Fresno	Southwest
Colorado	Janna Durbin	21	Golden	Southwest
Connecticut	Alison Benusis		Ridgefield	Northeast
Delaware	Annmarie Correll		Hockessin	Northeast
District of Columbia	Alena Neves		Washington, DC	Northeast
Florida	Shakeela Gajadha		Coral Gables	South
Georgia	Erin Nance	21	Calhoun	South
Hawaii	Kelly Ann Hu	24	Honolulu	Southwest
Idaho	Natalie Nukaya		Idaho Falls	Northwest
Illinois	Susie Park	25	Chicago	Midwest
Indiana	Lisa Higgins		South Bend	Midwest
Iowa	Jan Hoyer		Fort Madison	Midwest
Kansas	Tavia Shackles	21	Shawnee	Midwest
Kentucky	Karen Gibson		Kevil	South
Louisiana	Jennifer Mitchell		Leesville	South
Maine	Jody Cutting		Waterville	Northeast
Maryland	Mary Ann Cimino	20	Baltimore	Northeast
Massachusetts	Stacey Blaine		Bellingham	Northeast
Michigan	Kenya Summer Moore	22	Detroit	Midwest
Minnesota	Kristi Hennecks		Anoka	Midwest
Mississippi	Sherry Bowles		Lambert	South
Missouri	Stephanie Nunn	20	Marshfield	Midwest
Montana	Kristen Anderson	24	Columbia Falls	Northwest
Nebraska	Tish Gade		Lincoln	Midwest
Nevada	Alexis Oliver		Las Vegas	Southwest
New Hampshire	Heidi Cambra	25	Hampstead	Northeast
New Jersey	Amy Fissel	25	Ocean City	Northeast
New Mexico	Daniela Johnson	22	Albuquerque	Southwest
New York	Wendy Marie Mock	21	Levittown	Northeast
North Carolina	Christa Tyson		Monroe	South
North Dakota	Jennifer Seminary	24	Fargo	Midwest
Ohio	Andrea Pacione		North Royalton	Midwest
Oklahoma	Brenda Caudle		Oklahoma City	South
Oregon	Dawn Kennedy		Lake Oswego	Northwest
Pennsylvania	Kimmarie Johnson		Pittsburgh	Northeast
Rhode Island	Juli Roach		Wakefield	Northeast
South Carolina	Kelli Gosnell	22	Pacolet	South
South Dakota	Kara Rovere	22	Sturgis	Midwest
Tennessee	Camila 'Cammy' Gregory †	25	Paris	South
Texas	Angie Sisk	26	Houston	Southwest
Utah	Natalie Pyper	24	Salt Lake City	Southwest
Vermont	Jodi Sicely		Burlington	Northeast
Virginia	Stephanie Satterfield	19	Virginia Beach	South
Washington	Kandi Fletcher		Longview	Northwest
West Virginia	Jennifer Johnson		Huntington	South
Wisconsin	Heather Hanson	20	Madison/Cascade	Midwest
Wyoming	Leissann Marie Stolz		Cheyenne	Northwest

== State notes ==
- This was the first year that Kimberly Greenwood, Miss Tennessee USA 1989, directed the Miss Tennessee USA pageant. She remains the director for Tennessee, and also for Georgia, and has produced two Miss USA winners.
- This was the third out of seven years that introducing the delegates in regions. However, this was the first year that the states and the regions was designated differently from the United States Census Bureau. (See List of regions in the United States#Census Bureau-designated regions and divisions for more information about the regions.)
