= Binibining Pilipinas 1994 =

Filipina beauty pageant

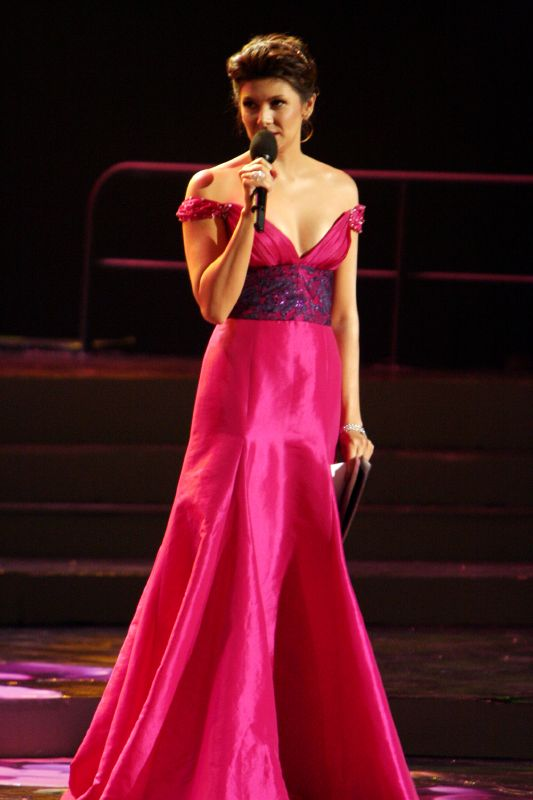
- Charlene Gonzales
- Date: October 31, 1993
- Presenters: Apa Ongpin; Gloria Diaz; Margarita Moran
- Venue: Araneta Coliseum, Quezon City, Philippines
- Broadcaster: GMA Network
- Entrants: 34
- Placements: 15
- Winner: Charlene Gonzales; Manila
- Congeniality: Estrella Lizel Palmer; San Fernando, Pampanga
- Photogenic: Morena Carla Cabrera; Parañaque

Binibining Pilipinas 1994 was the 31st edition of Binibining Pilipinas. It took place at the Araneta Coliseum in Quezon City, Metro Manila, Philippines on October 31, 1993.

At the end of the event, Dindi Gallardo crowned Charlene Gonzales as Binibining Pilipinas Universe 1994, Ruffa Gutierrez crowned Caroline Subijano as Binibining Pilipinas World 1994, Sheela Mae Santarin crowned Alma Concepcion as Binibining Pilipinas International 1994, and Jenette Fernando crowned Sheila Marie Dizon as Binibining Pilipinas Tourism 1994. Abbygale Arenas was named First Runner-Up, while Eda Calonia was named Second Runner-Up.

== Results ==
Color keys

- The contestant was a semi-finalist/finalist in an international pageant.

Placement	Contestant	International Placement
Binibining Pilipinas Universe 1994	Bb. #14 – Charlene Mae Gonzales	Top 6 – Miss Universe 1994
Binibining Pilipinas World 1994	Bb. #17 – Caroline Subijano	Top 10 – Miss World 1994
Binibining Pilipinas International 1994	Bb. #26 – Alma Concepcion	Top 15 – Miss International 1994
Binibining Pilipinas Tourism 1994	Bb. #1 – Sheila Marie Dizon	
1st runner-up	Bb. #20 – Abbygale Arenas	
2nd runner-up	Bb. #3 – Eda Calonia	
Top 15	Bb. #2 – Raquel Wambangco; Bb. #6 – Janine Marie Barredo; Bb. #9 – Morena Carla Cabrera; Bb. #10 – Labelle Paraiso; Bb. #12 – Desiree Dawn del Rosario; Bb. #19 – Maria Angelina Merced; Bb. #24 – Marie Catherine Muñoz; Bb. #30 – Veronica Villacorta; Bb. #34 – Maria Sovietskaya Bacud	

== Contestants ==
Thirty-three contestants competed for the four titles.

No.	Contestant	Age	City/Province	Notes
1	Sheila Marie Dizon	21	Las Piñas	
2	Raquel Wambangco	23	Makati	
3	Eda Calonia	20	Davao City	
5	Shiela Marie Ramos	19	San Jose del Monte, Bulacan	
6	Janine Marie Barredo	21	San Juan	
7	Anna Carlota San Jose	17	Olongapo	
8	Maria Celina Santiago	24	Malolos, Bulacan	
9	Morena Carla Cabrera	18	Parañaque	Crowned Mutya ng Pilipinas-Queen of the Year 1995
10	Labelle Paraiso	17	Canada	
11	Mary Christine Carpio	23	Cebu	
12	Desiree Dawn del Rosario	22	Cavite	
13	Lois Real	24	Bicol Region	
14	Charlene Mae Gonzales	19	Manila	Top 6 finalist at Miss Universe 1994; Won Best National Costume at Miss Universe 1994; Daughter of Binibining Ilang-Ilang 1964, Elvira Gonzales
15	Djhoanna Soliman	19	Arayat, Pampanga	
16	Laura Angela Navera	18	Malabon	
17	Caroline Subijano	22	Manila	Top 10 semi-finalist at Miss World 1994
18	Michelle Tuazon	19	Mabalacat, Pampanga	
19	Maria Angelina Merced	22	San Fernando, Cebu	
20	Abbygale Arenas	18	Angeles City	Eventually crowned Binibining Pilipinas-Universe 1997; Won Miss Photogenic at Miss Universe 1997
21	Zoraida Velasquez	20	Las Piñas	
22	Estrella Lizel Palmer	19	San Fernando, Pampanga	
23	Maria Amalia Tiglao	20	Macabebe, Pampanga	
24	Marie Catherine Muñoz	18	Parañaque	
25	Maria Lizette Laurel	21	Albay	
26	Alma Concepcion	17	Rizal	Top 15 semi-finalist at Miss International 1994; Won Miss Congeniality at Miss International 1994
27	Maria Anna Bernarte	23	Quezon City	
28	Maria Salome Pineda	18	La Union	
29	Shiela Lacerna	21	Batangas	
30	Veronica Villacorta	25	Bocaue, Bulacan	
31	Fedelita Villaseñor	21	Lucena, Quezon	
32	Emmarie Sabat	17	Marikina	
33	Angelica Pineda	17	Pampanga	
34	Maria Sovietskaya Bacud	18	Mandaluyong	Second runner-up at Miss Intercontinental 1995; First runner-up at Binibining Pilipinas 1996
