= Lu Parker =

American beauty pageant contestant and speaker

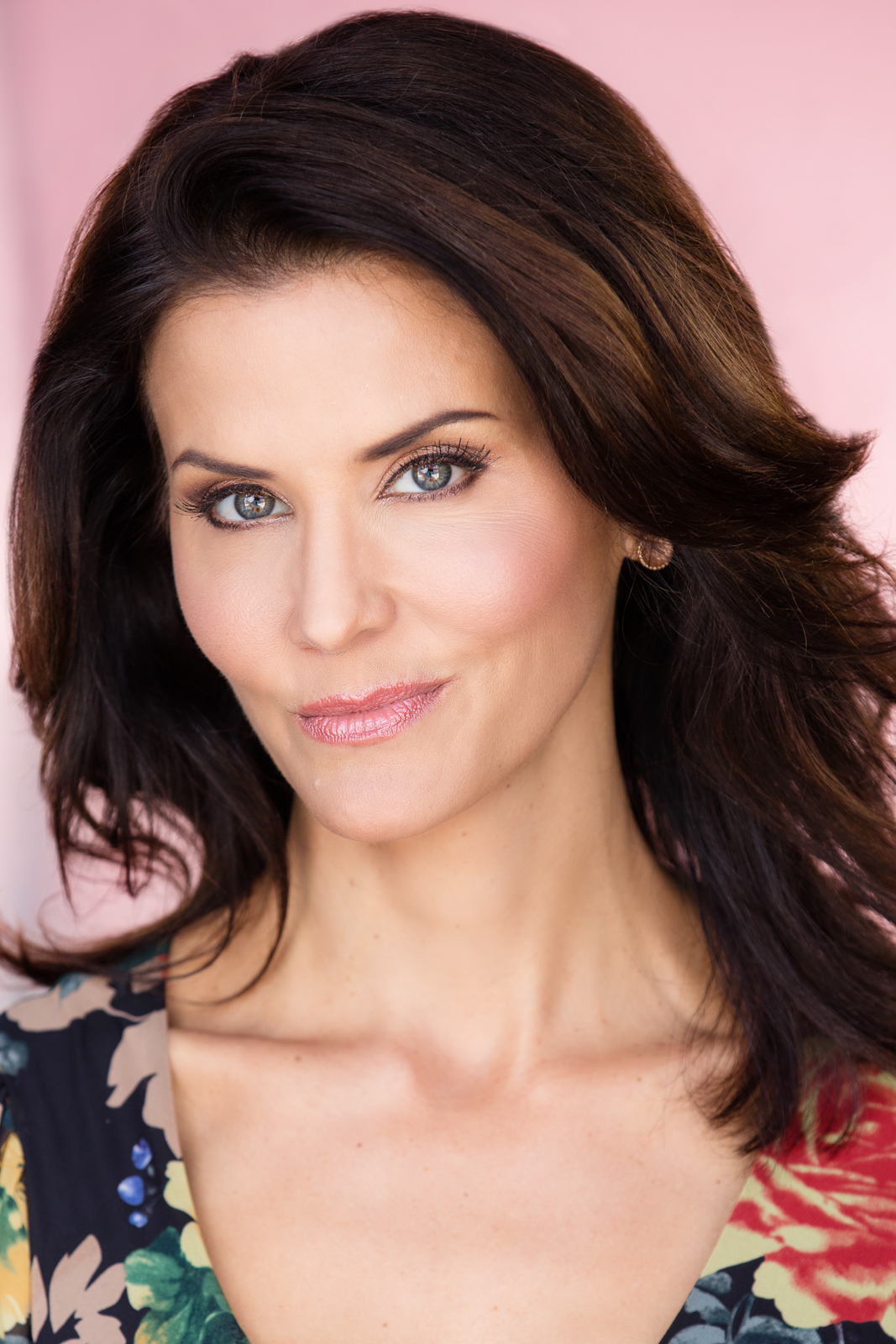
- Born: Frances Louise Parker; April 16, 1968 (age 58); Anderson, South Carolina, U.S.
- Education: College of Charleston, The Citadel
- Occupations: Journalist, Motivational Speaker
- Employer: KTLA 2005 - 2026
- Title: Miss South Carolina USA 1994; Miss USA 1994
- Awards: Order of the Palmetto; Emmy Award; Genesis Awards
- Website: luparker.com bekindandco.com

Frances Louise Parker (born April 16, 1968) is an American journalist, animal rights advocate, motivational speaker and beauty pageant titleholder who was crowned Miss USA 1994 and represented the United States at Miss Universe 1994 where she placed Top 6.

== Early life ==
Born in Anderson, South Carolina, Parker attended the College of Charleston, where she was a sister of Alpha Delta Pi and received a Bachelor of Arts degree in English and was later named Alumnus of the Year. She then went on to receive a Master of Arts in Education from The Citadel.

After graduating, Parker taught English literature at North Charleston and Middleton High Schools. Lu has been presented with the Order of the Palmetto, the highest civilian honor given in the state of South Carolina, and has been recognized in the South Carolina Congressional Record twice as an outstanding South Carolinian.

Her first television broadcasting job was for WCSC-TV in Charleston, South Carolina, where she was an education reporter and fill-in anchor.

== Pageantry ==
After winning Miss South Carolina USA, Parker competed at Miss USA 1994. She came into the semi-finals in first place, having won all three preliminary competitions. After the semi-finals, she went into the Top 6 in second place. After the judges' question, she just made the cut in the final three in third place, eventually becoming the third South Carolinian to be crowned Miss USA. She continued on to compete in the 1994 Miss Universe Pageant in Manila, Philippines, where she placed among the top 6 finalists. Her national costume was an astronaut.

In 2016, she was one of the judges at the Miss Teen USA 2016 pageant, at The Venetian Theatre, Las Vegas, Nevada. Parker has authored a book on pageantry titled Catching the Crown: The Source for Pageant Competition.

== Career ==
=== Communications career ===
In San Antonio, KABB TV hired Parker to serve as a weekend anchor and reporter. Parker was promoted to main anchor in 2000. In February 2003, she became the host for "Great Day SA" at KENS 5, which is San Antonio's top-rated live entertainment morning show.

=== KTLA ===
In January 2005, she moved to Los Angeles to join Frank Buckley as co-anchor for KTLA's "KTLA Prime News" on weekends. In 2007, Parker began to co-anchor the weekday "KTLA Morning News" at 5:00 A.M and 6:00 A.M. with Cher Calvin. Parker has been the anchor for the 11am - 2pm and 3pm newscasts at KTLA since 2015. She has won multiple Emmy Awards for her work.

Parker has made appearances on "Larry King Live" and E! Entertainment Television. She has acted in some films and television shows, most often as a news anchor.

In 2016, she partnered with Maria Shriver and KTLA creating an inspirational webshow titled The Path with Lu Parker.

In February 2026, Parker was laid off by KTLA.

== Personal life ==
Parker began a relationship with Antonio Villaraigosa, Mayor of Los Angeles, in March 2009. Her employer, KTLA, was reportedly unaware of this fact until May 2009. Parker reported several stories on Villaraigosa prior to publicly revealing her relationship with him. Villaraigosa and Parker split in May 2012.

=== Arrest at LAX ===
On November 2, 2016 Parker was arrested at Los Angeles International Airport (LAX) after taking a pair of earbuds which did not belong to her from a TSA security checkpoint. The earbuds belonged to a Los Angeles Police Department detective who later placed Parker under private person's arrest, as she was not on-duty. Parker explained her actions by saying she was going to try and find the owner, but when she couldn't find the rightful owner she decided to board her flight with the earbuds still in her possession.

Los Angeles World Airports police officers later boarded the flight before the door was closed and removed Parker from the plane. She was later booked and charged with theft. Parker later agreed to enter a diversion program with the Los Angeles city attorney's office which will allow her to avoid being convicted, pleading guilty or even having a criminal record. No charges were filed.

=== Animal advocacy ===
In 2010, Parker founded the Lu Parker project, whose stated mission is to "improve the lives of at-risk youth and homeless animals through direct service, education, and advocacy."
