= Carol Grow =

American actress and model (born 1971)

- Born: Carol Ann Hovenkamp; May 23, 1971 (age 55); Little Rock, Arkansas, U.S.
- Other name: Carol Hovenkamp Carbone
- Height: 5 ft 4 in (1.63 m)
- Beauty pageant titleholder
- Title: Miss Kansas USA 1994
- Hair color: Blonde
- Eye color: Blue
- Major competition: Miss USA 1994 (Top 12)

Carol Ann Hovenkamp-Grow (born May 23, 1971), also known an Carol Hovenkamp Carbone, is an American former actress, model, television personality and beauty pageant titleholder who was crowned Miss Kansas USA 1994 and competed at Miss USA 1994 where she placed Top 12.

== Personal Life ==
Hovenkamp was born in Little Rock, Arkansas. She told Howard Stern a man tried to abduct her near her high school when she was 17 years old and the police were called to remove him from the area. She also shared she was shot in the hand during a road rage incident after her friend called the other driver a racial slur. On July 1, 1995, Carol married former football player Monte Grow. In 2003, Carol participated in the off-Broadway play Pieces (Of Ass) which featured monologues about 'the perks and the privileges' and 'the problems and the pressures' of being an attractive woman. In 2008, she was arrested in Florida for possession of Hydrocodone and disorderly conduct.

== Career ==
In 1993, Hovenkamp won the Miss Kansas USA title and went on to represent Kansas in the Miss USA 1994 pageant broadcast live from South Padre Island, Texas on February 11, 1994. She became the fourth consecutive delegate from her state to make the top twelve in the pageant, with an average preliminary score that put her eighth. Once the scores were leveled Grow placed twelve in the interview competition and eleventh in swimsuit and evening gown, which gave her an average score placing her eleventh overall.

After this, she modeled for Venus Swimwear for 14 years consecutively. She also hosted Co-Ed Training on ESPN2 and appeared regularly on body shaping. On E-Entertainment she was the host of Search Party and did several "Wild On" episodes as well as various guest appearances on television programs such as Baywatch and General Hospital. Grow Co-Hosted the E!'s 1999 Reality Series Search Party with Scott Lasky. She was also a sideline reporter for the XFL and on Robot Wars: Extreme Warriors. She was ranked #80 on the Maxim Hot 100 Women of 2001.
