= Miss Kansas USA =

Beauty pageant competition

- Formation: 1952
- Type: Beauty pageant
- Headquarters: Shawnee
- Location: Kansas
- Members: Miss USA
- Official language: English
- Key people: John M. Vannatta; Jason Vannatta; Jennifer Vannatta-Fisher, State Pageant Director
- Website: Official website

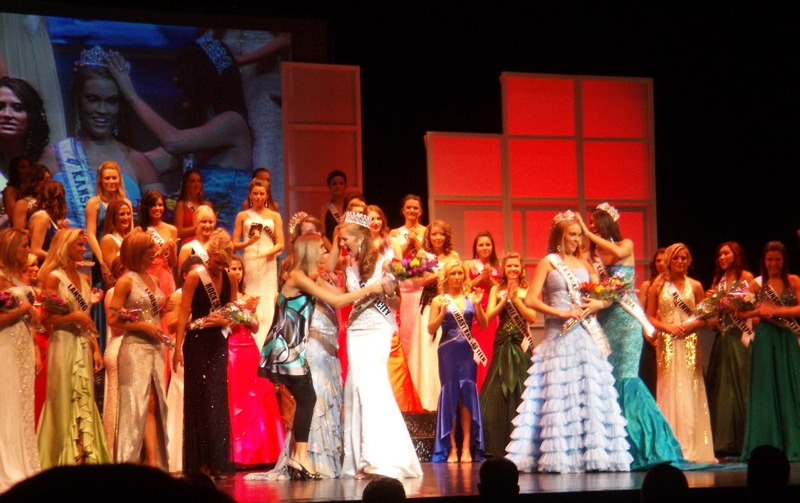
At the conclusion of the Miss Kansas USA and Miss Kansas Teen USA 2008 pageant held in Lawrence, Kansas in December 2007, Michelle Gillespie is crowned by Cara Gorges (left)

The Miss Kansas USA pageant is a competition that selects the representative for the state of Kansas in the Miss USA pageant. The pageant is directed by Vanbros and Associates, headquartered in Lenexa, Kansas. In 1992, the state joined the Vanbros group, under the directorship of Miss Kansas 1998 Jennifer Vannatta-Fisher.

Kansas did not place at Miss USA until 1973, the third-to-last state to make their first placement. From then, no delegate from Kansas made the cut until 1991, when Kelli McCarty won the crown in Wichita. McCarty's win made Kansas the only state to host one Miss USA and Miss Teen USA to win in their home state, as Keylee Sue Sanders won Miss Teen USA 1995, which was also held in Wichita. Kansas also had two first runners-up, including Danielle Boatwright, who would later win Survivor: Guatemala in 2005, one second runner-up, one third runner-up, and one fourth runner-up, among others. The most recent placement was Bella Whitlock in 2024, placing Top 20.

Eight former Miss Kansas Teen USAs went on to win the Miss title, and also two Miss Missouri Teen USAs (Missouri is also a Vanbros state).

Madilynn Becker from Herington was crowned Miss Kansas USA 2026 on June 7, 2026, at Polsky Theater in Overland Park. She will represent Kansas at Miss USA 2026.

== Gallery of titleholders ==
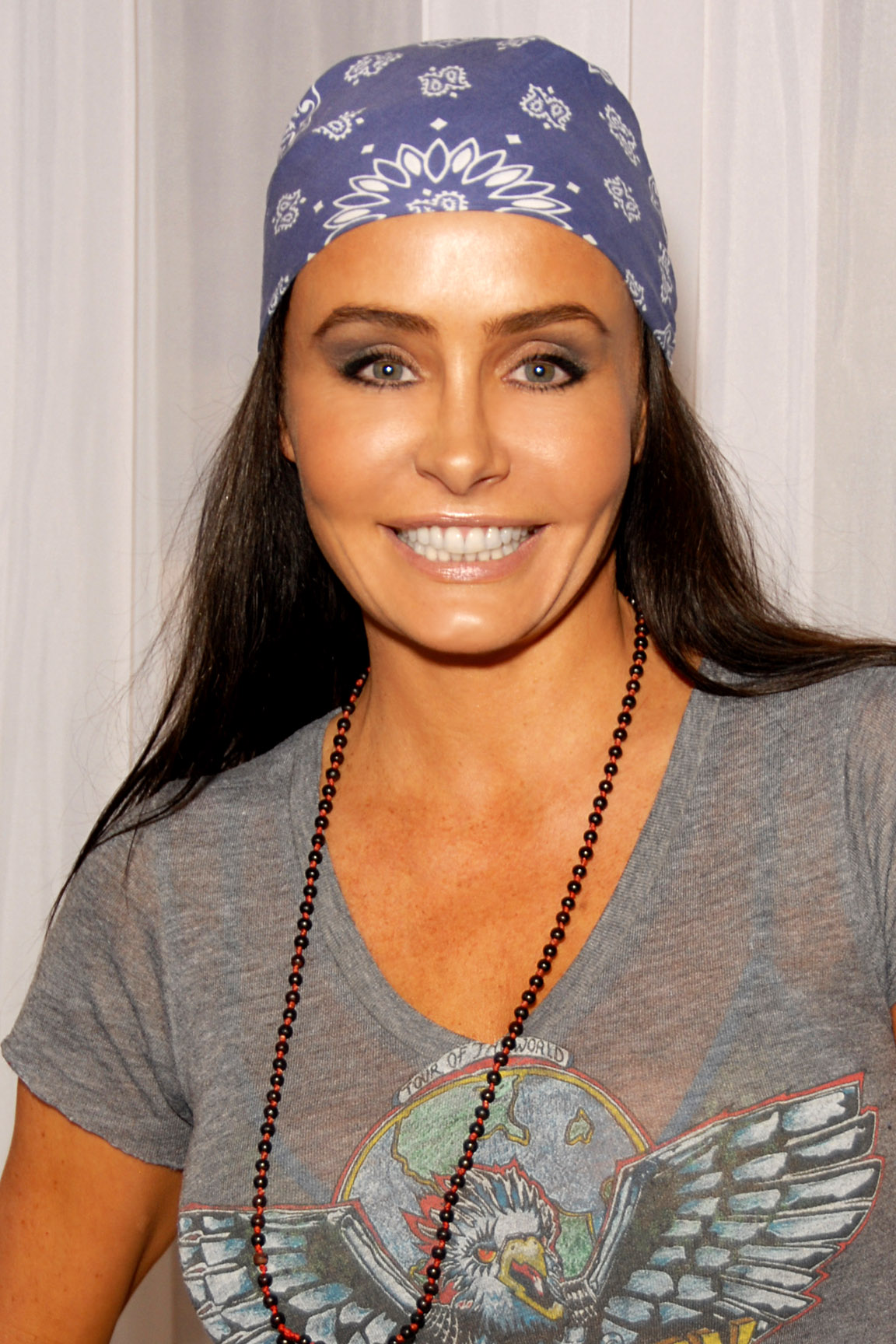
Kelli McCarty, Miss Kansas USA 1991 & Miss USA 1991

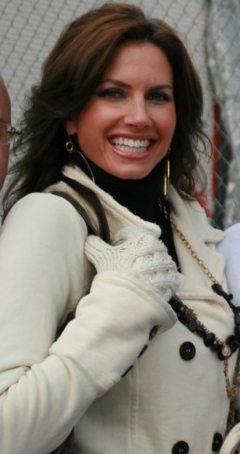
Danielle Boatwright, Miss Kansas USA 1996

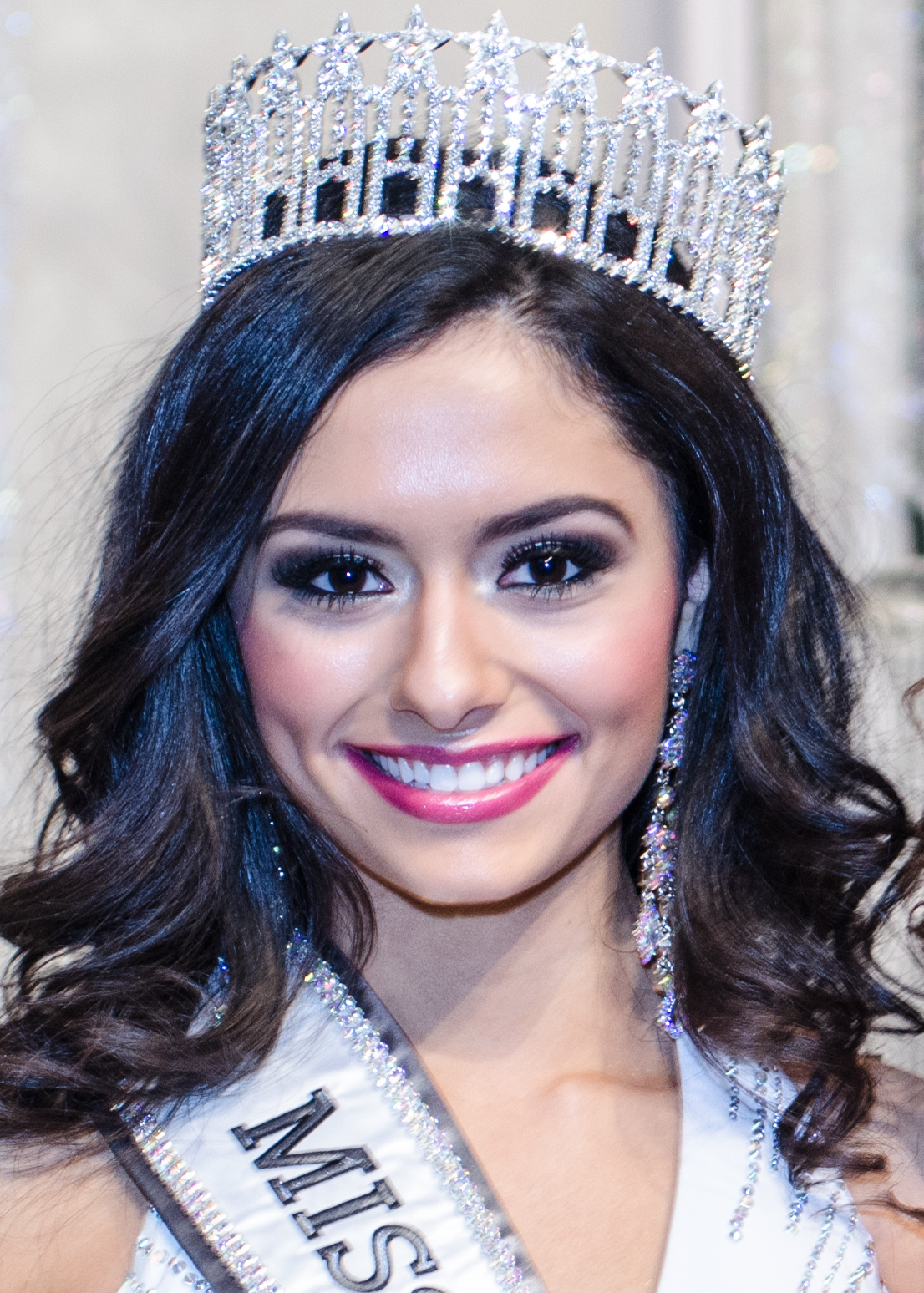
Alexis Railsback, Miss Kansas USA 2015

== Results summary ==
=== Placements ===
- Miss USAs: Kelli McCarty (1991)
- 1st runners-up: Danielle Boatwright (1996), Lindsay Douglas (2002)
- 2nd runners-up: Tavia Shackles (1993), Cara Gorges (2007)
- Top 5/6: Kimberlee Girrens (1992), Tiffany Meyer (2000)
- Top 10/12: Brenda Kopmeyer (1973), Carol Hovenkamp (1994), Alyssa Klinzing (2019), Elyse Noe (2022)
- Top 15/16: Bethany Gerber (2010), Gracie Hunt (2021)
- Top 20: Bella Whitlock (2024), Madilynn Becker (2026)

Kansas holds a record of 15 placements at Miss USA.

=== Awards ===
- Best State Costume: Tavia Shackles (1993)
- Most Beautiful Eyes: Tavia Shackles (1993)
- Best in Swimsuit: Danielle Boatwright (1996)

== Titleholders ==
Color key

- Declared as Winner
- Ended as runner-up
- Ended as one of the finalists or semifinalists

Year	Name	Hometown	Age (Note: Age at the time of the Miss USA pageant)	Local title	Placement at Miss USA	Special awards at Miss USA	Notes
2026	Madilynn Becker	Herington	22	Miss Herington	Top 20		Previously Miss Kansas Teen USA 2021
2025	Asia Cymone Smith	Wichita	26	Miss East Wichita			
2024	Bella Whitlock	Leavenworth	19	Miss Leavenworth	Top 20		
2023	Haley Berger	Lawrence	22	Miss Lawrence			Daughter of Prathumrat Woramali Berger, Miss Thailand World 1989
2022	Elyse Noe	Lawrence	23	Miss Lawrence	Top 12		
2021	Gracie Hunt	Overland Park	22	Miss Kansas City	Top 16		Previously Miss Texas International 2018; Daughter of Tavia Shackles, Miss Kansas USA 1993 and Miss Missouri Teen USA 1990 and Kansas City Chiefs CEO Clark Hunt; Granddaughter of Lamar Hunt
2020	Hayden Brax	Leawood	20	Miss Kansas City			Cousin of Hope Driskill, Miss Missouri USA 2011
2019	Alyssa Klinzing	Olathe	20	Miss Conway	Top 10		Previously Miss Kansas Teen USA 2013; Top 16 finalist at Miss Teen USA 2013; Previously Miss Teen Earth USA 2015; Eligible as a student at Whittier College; Later Miss California Earth USA 2020; Finished first runner-up at Miss Earth USA 2021
2018	Melanie Shaner	Overland Park	20	Miss Johnson County			Previously Miss Kansas Teen USA 2015
2017	Catherine Carmichael	Manhattan	25	Miss Lawrence			Previously Miss Kansas World 2015; Top 12 at Miss World America 2015
2016	Victoria Wiggins	Junction City	24	Miss Milford Lake			
2015	Alexis Railsback	Shawnee	19	Miss Shawnee			
2014	Audrey Banach	Kansas City	22	Miss Wildcat			
2013	Staci Klinginsmith	Lenexa	26	Miss Lenexa			
2012	Gentry Miller	Kansas City	24	Miss Kansas City			Previously Miss Kansas Teen USA 2006; Top 10 finalist at Miss Teen USA 2006
2011	Jaymie Stokes	Lenexa	20	Miss Lenexa			Previously Miss Kansas Teen USA 2007; Top 10 finalist at Miss Teen USA 2007
2010	Bethany Gerber	Winfield	21	Miss Cowley County	Top 15, finishing in 13th Place		Featured in January 2011 issue of Industrial Engineer about her titleholding role
2009	Courtney Courter	Olathe	23	Miss Metro Kansas City			
2008	Michelle Gillespie	Mission Hills	22	Miss Kansas City			
2007	Cara Gorges	Clearwater	19	Miss Clearwater	2nd runner-up		
2006	Ashley Aull	Lansing	20	Miss Leavenworth County			
2005	Rachel Saunders	Tonganoxie	21	Miss Tonganoxie			
2004	Lisa Forbes	Overland Park	22	Miss Overland Park			Later Miss Earth USA 2007, USA representative to Miss Earth 2007.
2003	Alicia Cabrera	Leawood	23	Miss Leawood			
2002	Lindsay Douglas	Lawrence	23	Miss Lawrence	1st Runner-up		
2001	Kristie Kay Knox	Hutchinson	25	Miss Wescoe Beach			
2000	Tiffany Tenille Meyer		25		Top 5 (4th)		Previously Miss Missouri Teen USA 1994; Top 6 at Miss Teen USA 1994
1999	Amanda Carraway	Manhattan	21	Miss Manhattan			Previously Miss Kansas Teen USA 1996; Mother of Miss Teen USA 2025 Mailyn Marsh
1998	Cammie Morisseau	Wichita	18	Miss Lawrence			
1997	Kathryn Taylor	Overland Park	24				
1996	Danielle Boatwright	Tonganoxie	20		1st Runner-up	Best in Swimsuit	Previously Miss Kansas Teen USA 1992; 2nd runner-up at Miss Teen USA 1992; Sports broadcaster and winner of Survivor: Guatemala
1995	Deborah Daulton	Salina	18				
1994	Carol Hovenkamp	Overland Park	19		Top 12 Semi-finalist, finishing in 11th Place		
1993	Tavia Shackles	Shawnee	21		2nd Runner-up	Best State Costume & Most Beautiful Eyes Award	Previously Miss Missouri Teen USA 1990; Top 12 at Miss Teen USA 1990; Later married Kansas City Chiefs chairman and CEO Clark Hunt; Mother of Gracie Hunt, Miss Kansas USA 2021; Daughter-in-law of Chiefs, AFL, and MLS founder Lamar Hunt
1992	Kimberlee E. Girrens	Wichita	26		Top 6 Finalist, Finishing in 5th Place		Previously Miss Kansas Teen USA 1986; Later Mrs. Kansas America 2004 under her married name, Kimberlee Easter
1991	Kelli McCarty	Liberal	21		Miss USA 1991		Top 6 finalist at Miss Universe 1991; Starred as Beth Wallace in the NBC show Passions
1990	Rebecca Porter	Wichita					
1989	Nancy Burris	Colby					
1988	Cynthia Decker	Manhattan					
1987	Martina Castle	Overland Park					
1986	Audra Ockerman	Wichita					Mother of Claire-Bailey Lee, Miss Kansas Teen USA 2014
1985	Jill Denzin	Leawood	21				
1984	Elizabeth Therese "Buffy" Johnson	Prairie Village	19				
1983	Renee Ruch	Mission					
1982	Stefani Larson	Overland Park					
1981	Missy Kaser	Wichita					
1980	Lisa Lynn Boyd	Wichita					
1979	Linda Shields	Lawrence					
1978	Mary Bell	Wichita					
1977	Sherry Brane	Wichita					
1976	Deborah Vitera	Ottawa					
1975	Robbin Lea Loomas	Overland Park					
1974	Lorraine Breckenridge	Wichita					
1973	Brenda Kopmeyer	Overland Park			Semi-finalist		
1972	Mona Guesnier	Great Bend					
1971	Nancy Bishop	Overland Park					
1970	Norma Lou Decker	Tecumseh					
1969	Molly McGugin	Frankfurt					
1968	Anne Layton	Baldwin City					
1967	Regina Wolfe						
1966	Pat Ravenscroft	Overland Park					
1965	Linda Bergsten						
1964	Barbara Ford						
1963	Diane Victoria Stalker						
1962	Linda Light						
1961	Dixie Cook						
1960	Peggy Patterson						
1955–59	No national representative						
1954	Sue Ravenscroft	Liberal	18				
1953	No national representative						
1952	Bette Renick						
