= Kelli McCarty =

American actress and model

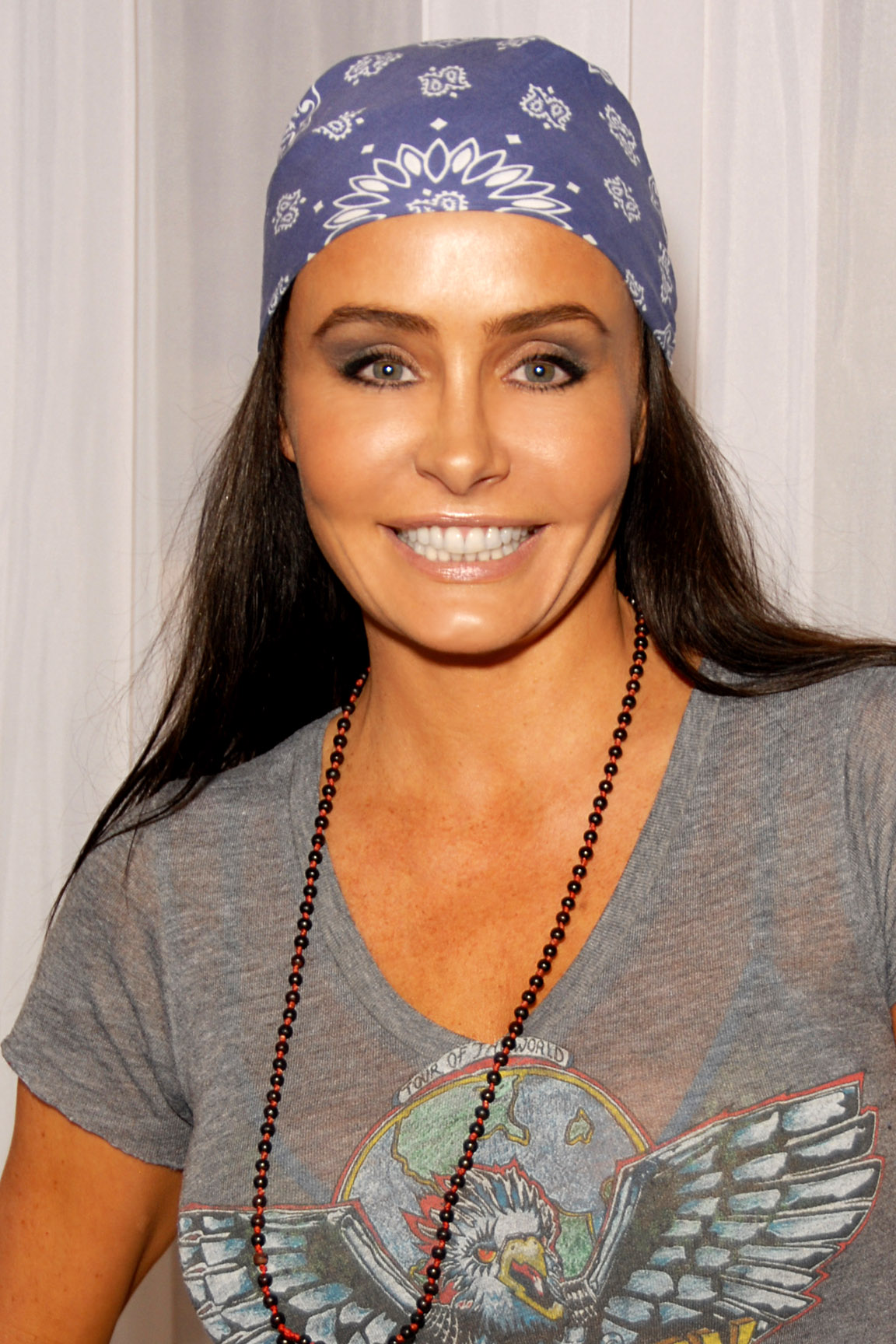
- McCarty in 2010
- Occupations: Actress; pornographic actress; model; photographer
- Beauty pageant titleholder
- Title: Miss Kansas USA 1991; Miss USA 1991
- Years active: 1991–present
- Major competitions: Miss Kansas USA 1991; (Winner); Miss USA 1991; (Winner); Miss Universe 1991; (Top 6)

Kelli McCarty is an American actress, model, photographer and beauty pageant titleholder who was crowned Miss USA 1991. She then reached the Top 6 at Miss Universe 1991, representing the United States. McCarty has appeared as Beth Wallace on the soap opera Passions (1999–2006). After Passions, McCarty began working as a pornographic film actor, in a number of softcore and hardcore films, in an exclusive contract with Vivid Entertainment.

== Career ==
Kelli McCarty won Miss USA 1991 as Miss Kansas USA. It was the first time a contestant from Kansas had won the title.

In the mid-1990s, McCarty went on to pursue a career in acting and had her television debut as a guest star on comedy series Dream On. McCarty went on to have a recurring role as Ms. Linda Lovelson in the Disney Channel Original Series Even Stevens and also appeared on Beverly Hills, 90210, Melrose Place, Phil of the Future, That's So Raven and Beyond the Break. She appeared on an episode of the dating show Baggage. In 2002 she earned a singing credit for her performance in the Shia LaBeouf comedy series Even Stevens in the episode titled Influenza: The Musical.

On NBC Daytime's soap opera Passions she appeared as Beth Wallace, the hardworking high school sweetheart and ex-fiancée of the handsome Luis Lopez-Fitzgerald. McCarty had the role of Beth from 1999 until her character was killed off in a train explosion in 2006. In all, she is credited with 284 episodes of the show; Passions ended its run in 2008.

McCarty also appeared in a number of softcore adult films during her career. In 2008, she approached adult entertainment company Vivid Entertainment about the idea of appearing in one of their productions. McCarty stipulated in her contract with Vivid that she would have involvement with casting the film as well as writing, editing, and have final approval over everything. Her hardcore film, Faithless, featured her in explicit, non-simulated sex scenes and was released on February 4, 2009. McCarty also appeared on The Howard Stern Show, KROQ-FM's Kevin and Bean, and FM Talk's Frosty, Heidi & Frank Show to promote the film. For her performance in the film, McCarty was nominated for two AVN awards for Best Actress and Acting Performance of the Year (Female).

McCarty also has a background in improvisational comedy. In 2009, while promoting her film Faithless, McCarty performed at Los Angeles ACME Comedy Theatre with its Sketch Comedy Troupe and participated in their Saturday Night Live weekly live take-off called ACME This Week.

McCarty has gone on to appear in a series of performances that include a starring role in the 2010 crime drama Dangerous Attractions, a multi-episode appearance on the television series Co-Ed Confidential and several television movies such as Love Test (2011) and Dark Secrets (2012). She has also appeared as herself in several documentaries and news shows such as Larry King Live, CNBC's Porn: Business of Pleasure, and the cable series Rated A for Adult.

== Other ventures ==
McCarty has worked as a professional photographer. Her business offers portrait, wedding, and boudoir photography services.

== Notes and interviews ==
- Profile of Kelli McCarty at SoapCentral.com
- Official Kelli McCarty by Vivid Video, 02/04
