= Binibining Pilipinas 1997 =

- Date: March 2, 1997
- Entertainment: Carlos Agassi; Jericho Rosales; Piolo Pascual
- Venue: Araneta Coliseum, Quezon City, Philippines
- Broadcaster: ABS-CBN
- Entrants: 33
- Placements: 10
- Winner: Abbygale Arenas; Angeles City
- Congeniality: Marites Descalso; Pampanga
- Photogenic: Kristine Florendo; Quezon City

Binibining Pilipinas 1997 was the 34th edition of Binibining Pilipinas. It took place at the Araneta Coliseum in Quezon City, Metro Manila, Philippines on March 2, 1997.

At the end of the event, Aileen Damiles crowned Abbygale Williamson Arenas as Binibining Pilipinas Universe 1997, Daisy Reyes crowned Kristine Florendo as Binibining Pilipinas World 1997, and Melanie Marquez, Miss International 1979, crowned Susan Jane Juan Ritter as Binibining Pilipinas International 1997. Abiele Arianne del Moral was named First Runner-Up, while Marivic Galang was named Second Runner-Up.

== Results ==
Color keys

- The contestant was a Semi-Finalist in an International pageant.
- The contestant did not place but won a Special Award in the pageant.
- The contestant did not place.

Placement	Contestant	International Placement
Binibining Pilipinas Universe 1997	Bb. #33 – Abbygale Arenas	Miss Photogenic – Miss Universe 1997
Binibining Pilipinas World 1997	Bb. #32 – Kristine Rachel Florendo	Unplaced – Miss World 1997
Binibining Pilipinas International 1997	Bb. #14 – Susan Jane Ritter	Top 15 – Miss International 1997
1st Runner-Up	Bb. #15 – Abiele Arianne del Moral	
2nd Runner-Up	Bb. #21 – Marivic Galang	
Top 10	Bb. #1 – Maureen Aleia Alcantara; Bb. #2 – Rosario Gonzales; Bb. #11 – Rochelle Romero Ong; Bb. #12 – Joanne Golong; Bb. #31– Germaine Christine Asuncion	

=== Special awards ===
Award	Contestant	Ref.
Miss Photogenic/AGFA	Bb. #32 – Kristine Florendo	
Miss Friendship	Bb. #24 – Marites Descalso	
Miss Talent	Bb. #4 – Gerby Cadungog	
Best In Swimsuit	Bb. #33 – Abbygale Arenas	
Best In Evening Gown	Bb. #33 – Abbygale Arenas	
Miss Pond's Beautiful Skin	Bb. #14 – Susan Jane Ritter	
Miss Sunsilk Beautiful Hair	Bb. #32 – Kristine Florendo	
Miss Close-Up Smile	Bb. #32 – Kristine Florendo	
Binibining Avon	Bb. #33 – Abbygale Arenas	
Miss PAL Sunniest Personality	Bb. #32 – Kristine Florendo	
Miss Slimmer's World	Bb. #14 – Susan Jane Ritter	

== Contestants ==
30 contestants competed for the three titles.

No.	Contestant	City/Province	Placement
1	Maureen Aleia Alcantara	Dagupan	Top 10
2	Rosario Gonzales	Manila	Top 10
3	Judith Austria	Taguig	
4	Gerby Cadungog	Marinduque	
5	Josephine Joy Astor	Angeles City	
6	Marie Anjeline Serrano	Butuan	
7	Maria Lualhati Malata	Davao City	
8	Alma Rita Eloisa Dupaya	Lal-lo, Cagayan	
9	Luningning Kilala Rances	Valenzuela	
11	Rochelle Romero Ong	Mabalacat, Pampanga	Top 10
12	Joanne Golong	Tacloban City	Top 10
13	Ivy Flores Teves	Pasig City	
14	Susan Jane Ritter	Zamboanga City	Binibining Pilipinas International 1997
15	Abiele Arianne del Moral	Angeles City	1st Runner-Up
16	Jo Anne Cabal	Parañaque	
17	Gretchen Abuso Loquias	Camiguin	
18	Divine Mercado Burce	Laguna	
20	Zara Jane De Jesus	Bulacan	
21	Marivic Galang	Apalit, Pampanga	2nd Runner-Up
22	Amanda Guidotti	San Juan	
23	Marion Leonore Filart	Manila	
24	Marites Descalso	Pampanga	
25	Maria Nelia Ilano	Baliuag, Bulacan	
26	Mari-Gold Jacela	Malabon	
27	Lizel Vinasoy	Isabela	
29	Jo-Anne Dominguez	Lubao, Pampanga	
30	Lowella Bulilan	Lubao, Pampanga	
31	Germaine Christine Asuncion	Filipino Community of North America	Top 10
32	Kristine Rachel Florendo	Quezon City	Binibining Pilipinas World 1997
33	Abbygale Arenas	Angeles City	Binibining Pilipinas Universe 1997

== Notes ==
=== Post-pageant notes ===
- Abbygale Arenas did not place at Miss Universe 1997 in Las Vegas, Nevada. However, she was awarded as Miss Photogenic. Arenas previously won the 1992 Supermodel of the Philippines and competed at the 1992 Supermodel of the World, but was unplaced.
- Kristine Florendo competed at Miss World 1997 in the Seychelles but was unplaced. On the other hand, Susan Jane Ritter competed at Miss International 1997 in Kyoto, Japan, and was one of Top 15.
- Rochelle Romero Ong competed at Mutya ng Pilipinas 1998, where she was eventually crowned Mutya ng Pilpinas-Asia Pacific 1998. She competed at Miss Asia Pacific 1998 but did not place.
