= Miss World 1991 =

International beauty pageant

- Miss World 1991 Titlecard
- Date: 28 December 1991
- Presenters: Peter Marshall; Gina Tolleson
- Entertainment: Indecent Obsession
- Venue: Georgia World Congress Center, Atlanta, Georgia, United States
- Broadcaster: E!
- Entrants: 78
- Placements: 10
- Debuts: Greenland
- Withdrawals: Barbados; Canada; Cook Islands; Egypt; Hong Kong; Luxembourg; Madagascar; Papua New Guinea; Peru; Sri Lanka; Union of Soviet Socialist Republics
- Returns: Antigua and Barbuda; Ecuador; Lebanon; Malaysia; South Africa; Swaziland; Taiwan
- Winner: Ninibeth Leal; Venezuela

Miss World 1991 was the 41st edition of the Miss World pageant, at the Georgia World Congress Center in Atlanta, Georgia, the United States, on 28 December 1991.

At the conclusion of the event, Gina Tolleson of the United States crowned Ninibeth Leal of Venezuela as her successor at the conclusion of the event. It is the fourth victory of Venezuela in the pageant. Miss World 1991 was scheduled to be held in the Dominican Republic but, due to scheduling difficulties, Miss World organisers moved the pageant, first to Puerto Rico, then finally settling in Atlanta, Georgia, in the United States. Preliminary swimsuits for the 1991 Miss World pageant was held in South Africa. The first runner-up was Leanne Buckle from Australia, and the second runner-up was Diana Tilden-Davis from South Africa.

== Selection of participants ==
=== Replacements ===
Antonia Balint of Hungary was stripped of the Miss Hungary 1991 title, after photographs printed in Hungarian newspapers showed that she had previously appeared in the men's magazine Lui and other publications against Miss World rules. She was replaced by her first runner-up, Timea Raba but Raba couldn't replace her for the same reason. Orsolya Michina represented Hungary instead.

=== Debuts, returns, and, withdrawals ===
This edition marked the debut of Greenland and the return of South Africa, which last competed 1977, (Note: South Africa returned after the Miss World Organization decided to lift a 14-year apartheid rule, allowing its contestants to compete.) Antigua and Barbuda last competed in 1986, Lebanon and Swaziland last competed in 1988 and Ecuador, Malaysia and Taiwan last competed in 1989.

Barbados, Cook Islands, Egypt, Hong Kong, Luxembourg, Madagascar, Papua New Guinea, Peru and Sri Lanka, withdrew from the competition. Tara Paat of Canada withdrew from the competition (Note: She quit from the Pageant few weeks before the finals due to a dispute with pageant officials following a trip to South Africa in which she observed racial discrimination which she felt was tacitly approved by pageant officials) and Ilmira Shamsutdinova of the Union of Soviet Socialist Republics, won Miss USSR 1991 and was invited to compete in this edition, but she was underage to attend.

Muriel Edoukou of Côte d'Ivoire was supposed to compete but withdrew from the competition due to failed to arrive. Tracy Ann D'Abreu of Guyana also withdrew from the competition due to the controversy over her victory and citizenship, she was declared ineligible to compete at Miss World 1991. Birgit Højgaard of Faroe Islands, was supposed to debut at Miss World 1991, however her separate participation was rejected by the Miss World Organization, because the Faroe Islands are an administrative part of Denmark, then she participated at Miss Denmark World 1991 and was second runner-up.

== Results ==
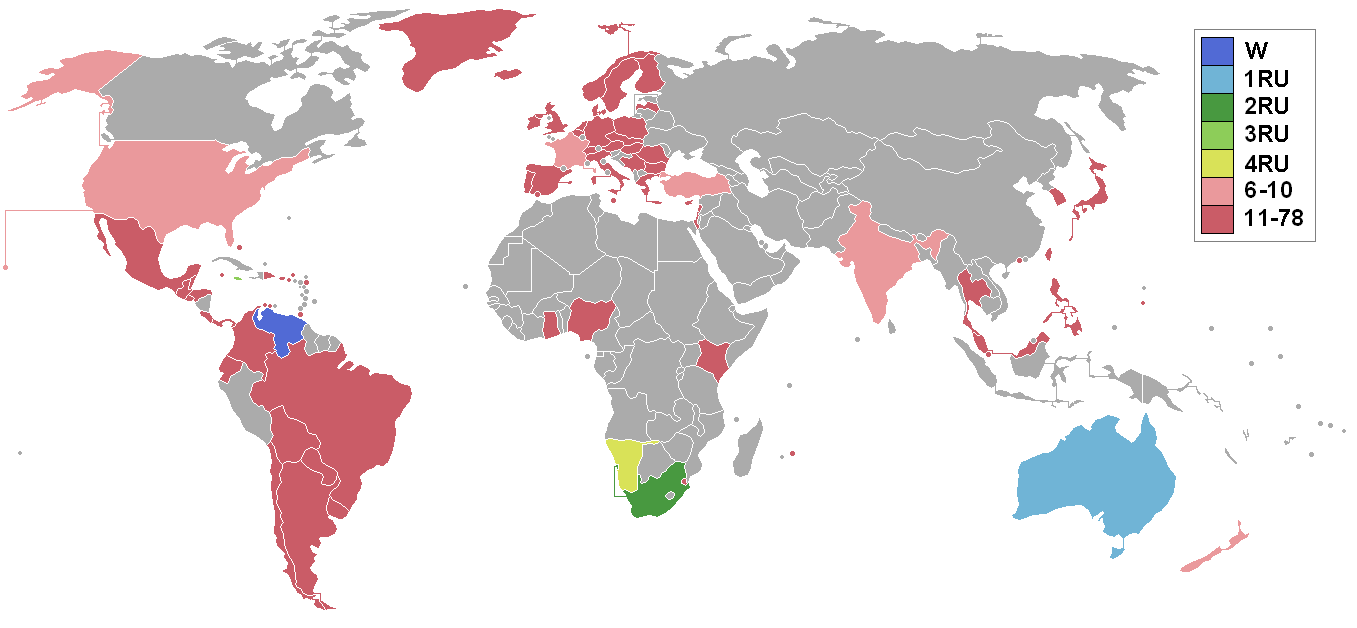
Countries and territories which sent delegates and results for Miss World 1991

=== Placements ===
| Placement | Contestant |
|---|---|
| Miss World 1991 | Venezuela – Ninibeth Leal |
| 1st Runner-Up | Australia – Leanne Buckle |
| 2nd Runner-Up | South Africa – Diana Tilden-Davis |
| Top 5 | Jamaica – Sandra Foster; Namibia – Michelle McLean |
| Top 10 | France – Mareva Georges; India – Ritu Singh; New Zealand – Lisa de Montalk; Turkey – Aslıhan Koruyan; United States – Charlotte Ray |

==== Continental Queens of Beauty ====
| Continent/Region | Contestant |
|---|---|
| Africa | South Africa – Diana Tilden-Davis |
| Americas | Venezuela – Ninibeth Leal |
| Asia & Oceania | Australia – Leanne Buckle |
| Caribbean | Jamaica – Sandra Foster |
| Europe | Turkey – Aslıhan Koruyan |

== Judges ==
- Mike Favre
- Brenda McLain
- Phil Hayes
- Marie DeGeorge
- Eric Morley - Chairman and CEO of Miss World Organization
- Jarvis Astaire
- Paul Block
- Jane Ambrose
- Edgar Botero

== Contestants ==
Seventy-eight contestants competed for the title.

| Country/Territory | Contestant | Age | Hometown |
|---|---|---|---|
| Antigua and Barbuda | Joanne Bird | 20 | St. John's |
| Argentina | Marcela Chazarreta | 20 | Buenos Aires |
| Aruba | Sandra Croes | 23 | Santa Cruz |
| Australia | Leanne Buckle | 21 | Brisbane |
| Austria | Andrea Pfeiffer | 18 | Graz |
| (The Bahamas) Bahamas | Tarnia Newton | 19 | New Providence |
| Belgium | Anke Van dermeersch | 19 | Antwerp |
| Belize | Josephine Gault | 21 | Belize City |
| Bolivia | Mónica Gamarra | 20 | Cochabamba |
| Brazil | Cátia Silene Kupssinskü | 20 | São Paulo |
| British Virgin Islands | Marjorie Penn | 18 | Tortola |
| Bulgaria | Liubomira Slavcheva | 17 | Sofia |
| Cayman Islands | Yvette Peggy Jordison | 19 | Grand Cayman |
| Chile | Carolina Michelson | 23 | Santiago |
| Colombia | Adriana Rodríguez | 20 | Bogotá |
| Costa Rica | Eugenie Jiménez | 20 | San Francisco de Heredia |
| Curaçao | Nashaira Desbarida | 23 | Willemstad |
| Cyprus | Anna Margaret Stephanou | 18 | Nicosia |
| Czechoslovakia | Andrea Tatarkova | 20 | Košice |
| Denmark | Sharon Givskav | 17 | Copenhagen |
| Dominican Republic | Rosanna Rodríguez | 21 | Concepción de La Vega |
| Ecuador | Sueanny Bejarano | 20 | Guayaquil |
| El Salvador | Lucía Beatriz López | 22 | San Salvador |
| Finland | Nina Autio | 20 | Tampere |
| France | Mareva Georges | 22 | Punaauia |
| Germany | Susanne Petry | 18 | Saarbrücken |
| Ghana | Jamilla Danzuru | 23 | Accra |
| Gibraltar | Ornella Costa | 17 | Gibraltar |
| Greece | Miriam Panagos | 20 | Athens |
| Greenland | Bibiane Holm | 18 | Nuuk |
| Guam | Yvonne Limtiaco Speight | 19 | Asan |
| Guatemala | Marlyn Magaña | 20 | Guatemala City |
| (Netherlands) Holland | Linda Egging | 21 | Stramproy |
| Honduras | Arlene Rauscher | 19 | Tegucigalpa |
| Hungary | Orsolya Michina | 19 | Budapest |
| Iceland | Svava Haraldsdóttir | 19 | Reykjavík |
| India | Ritu Singh | 20 | New Delhi |
| (Republic of Ireland) Ireland | Amanda Brunker | 18 | Dublin |
| Israel | Li'at Ditkovsky | 19 | Nordia |
| Italy | Sabina Pellati | 19 | Reggio Emilia |
| Jamaica | Sandra Foster | 21 | Kingston |
| Japan | Junko Tsuda | 21 | Tokyo |
| Kenya | N'kirote M'mbijjiwe | 21 | Meru |
| Latvia | Inese Šlesere | 19 | Riga |
| Lebanon | Diana Begdache | 20 | Beirut |
| Macau | Cristina Guilherme Lam | 20 | Macau |
| Malaysia | Samantha Schubert | 22 | Kuala Lumpur |
| Malta | Romina Genuis | 18 | Gżira |
| Mauritius | Marie Geraldine Deville | 18 | Centre de Flacq |
| Mexico | María Cristina Urrutia | 19 | Mexico City |
| Namibia | Michelle McLean | 19 | Windhoek |
| New Zealand | Lisa de Montalk | 21 | Taupō |
| Nigeria | Adenike "Nike" Oshinowo | 24 | Lagos |
| Norway | Anne-Britt Røvik | 18 | Molde |
| Panama | Malena Betancourt | 19 | Panama City |
| Paraguay | Vivian Benítez | 21 | Asunción |
| Philippines | Gemith Gemparo | 20 | Manila |
| Poland | Karina Wojciechowska | 19 | Katowice |
| Portugal | Maria do Carmo Ramalho | 20 | Lisbon |
| Puerto Rico | Johanna Irizarry | 20 | Lajas |
| Romania | Gabriela Dragomirescu | 20 | Bucharest |
| Singapore | Jasheen Jayakody | 18 | Singapore |
| South Africa | Diana Tilden-Davis | 22 | Johannesburg |
| South Korea (Note: Competed as Korea in the pageant) | Kim Tae-hwa | 20 | Busan |
| Spain | Catia Moreno | 20 | Tenerife |
| Swaziland | Jackie Bennett | 20 | Manzini |
| Sweden | Catrin Olsson | 23 | Kungsbacka |
| Switzerland | Sandra Aegerter | 22 | Aargau |
| Taiwan (Note: Also known as the Republic of China and competed as Chinese Taipei in the pageant) | Rebecca Lin | 23 | Taipei |
| Thailand | Rewadee Malaisee | 21 | Bangkok |
| Trinidad and Tobago | Sastee Bachan | 21 | Port of Spain |
| Turkey | Aslıhan Koruyan | 19 | Istanbul |
| United Kingdom | Joanne Elizabeth Lewis | 21 | Mansfield |
| United States | Charlotte Ray | 25 | Voorhees |
| United States Virgin Islands | Cheryl Leiba Milligan | 20 | St. Croix |
| Uruguay | Andrea Regina Gorrochategui | 23 | Montevideo |
| Venezuela | Ninibeth Leal | 20 | Maracaibo |
| (Socialist Federal Republic of Yugoslavia) Yugoslavia | Slavica Tripunović | 20 | Vukovar |

== Notes ==
=== Replacements ===
- Taiwan – Lu Shu-Fang

=== Other notes ===
- Namibia– Michelle McLean eventually competed in Miss Universe four months after she placed in the top five in Miss World 1991. She emerged victorious of the former pageant, thus making her the first Namibian to claim the Miss Universe crown.
