= Miss Teen USA 1983 =

1st edition of the Miss Teen USA competition

- Date: August 30, 1983
- Presenters: Michael Young; Morgan Brittany
- Venue: Lakeland Civic Auditorium, Lakeland, Florida
- Broadcaster: CBS; WTVT
- Entrants: 51
- Placements: 10
- Winner: Ruth Zakarian; New York
- Congeniality: Angela Boyd; Arkansas
- Photogenic: Linda Burkholder; Illinois

Miss Teen USA 1983, the first Miss Teen USA pageant, was televised live from the Lakeland Civic Auditorium in Lakeland, Florida on 30 August 1983. The event was hosted by Michael Young and included musical guests Air Supply and the Solid Gold Dancers. At the conclusion of the final competition, Ruth Zakarian of New York was crowned Miss Teen USA, by Miss USA 1983 Julie Hayek and Miss Universe 1983 Lorraine Downes.

== Background ==
The Miss Teen USA pageant was created by the owners of the Miss USA and Miss Universe pageants as a "natural extension" of those pageants. Originally, any winner over age 17 was automatically entered as a contestant-at-large at the Miss USA pageant. 1983 winner Ruth Zakarian competed at Miss USA 1984 and did not make the semi-finals.

As host city, Lakeland and its residents contributed at least $500,000 in goods and services, with the intention that the publicity brought by the pageant would offset this investment, however local merchants later admitted the return wasn't as great as expected. Contestants spent three weeks in the city in the lead up to the final night of competition and the telecast featured 45 minutes of promotional material of the contestants in locations around the city and county.

The pageant featured three nights of competition: the state costume competition on 20 August, the preliminary competition on 25 August and the final telecast on 30 August. Governor of Mississippi Bob Graham was slated to attend both the final pageant and the following coronation ball.

== Results ==
=== Placements ===
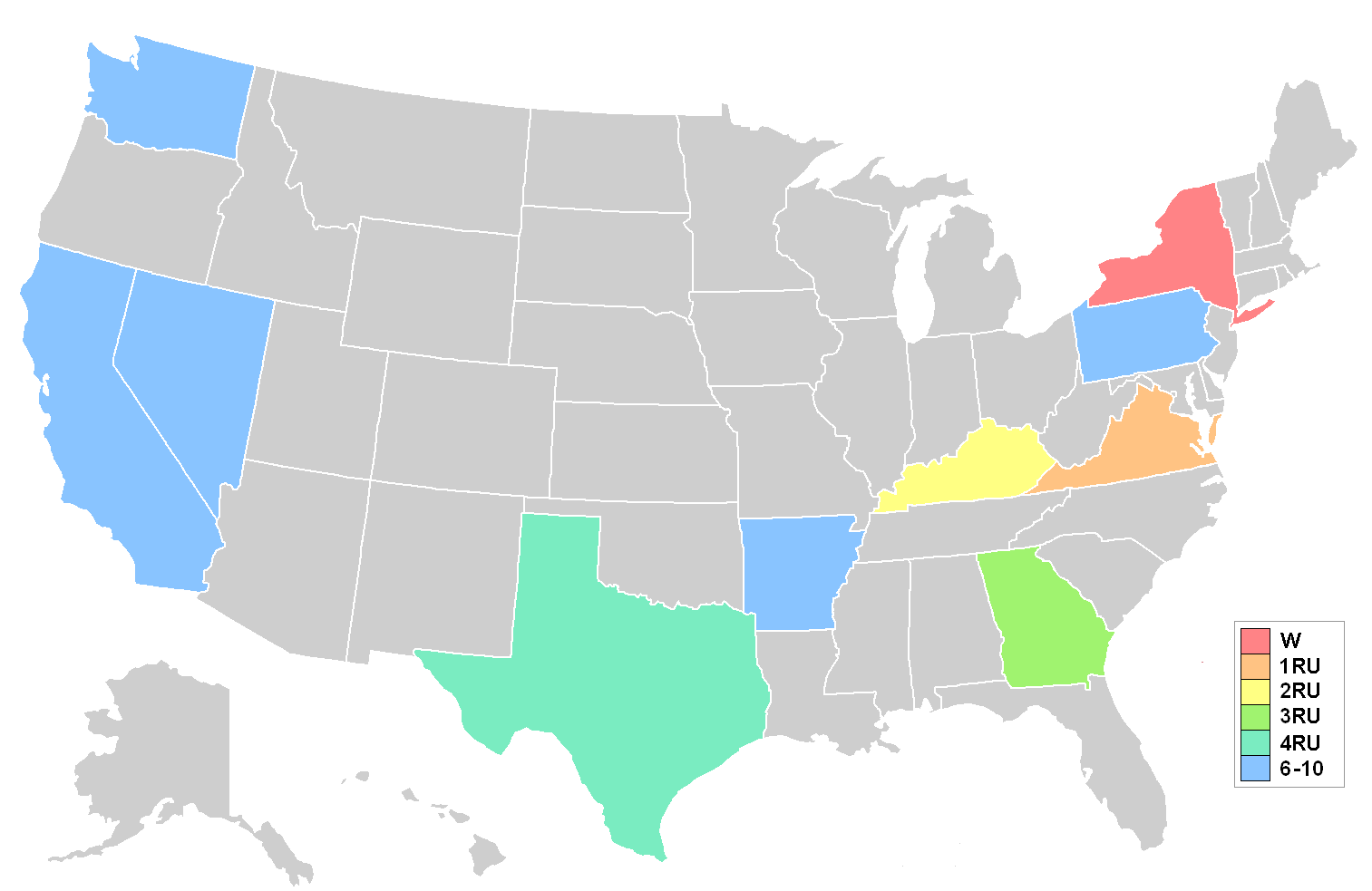
Map showing placements by state

Final results	Contestant
Miss Teen USA 1983	New York – Ruth Zakarian
1st Runner-Up	Virginia – Tina Marrocco
2nd Runner-Up	Kentucky – Krista Keith
3rd Runner-Up	Georgia – Kelly Jerles
4th Runner-Up	Texas – Sheri Sholz
Top 10	Arkansas – Angela Boyd; California – Shawn Gardner; Nevada – Kimberly “Kim” Cannon; Pennsylvania – Diane Hoyes; Washington – Rhonda Monroe

=== Special awards ===
Award	Contestant
Miss Congeniality	Arkansas – Angela Boyd
Miss Photogenic	Illinois – Linda Burkholder
Best state costume	Massachusetts – Christine Lawlor

== Judges ==
The celebrity judges for the pageant were:

- Jeffrey Apple – movie producer
- Tracey Bregman – actress on The Young and the Restless
- Anthony Carter – Michigan Panthers wide receiver
- Bonnie Kay – president of the Kay Models agency
- Emilio Estefan – percussionist for Miami Sound Machine
- Persis Khambatta – actress
- Nancy Stafford – actress
- Terri Utley – Miss USA 1982
- Kiki Vandeweghe - basketball player
- LeRoy Neiman – artist

== Delegates ==
The Miss Teen USA 1983 delegates were:

- Alabama - Jill Johnson (17)
- Alaska - Linda Fickus (18)
- Arizona - Kris Keim (17)
- Arkansas - Angela Boyd (18)
- California - Shawn Gardner (17)
- Colorado - Julie Meyer (18)
- Connecticut - Beth Waldron (14)
- Delaware - Laura Enslen (17)
- District of Columbia - Patricia Curtis (17)
- Florida - Lora Erdman (16)
- Georgia - Kelly Jerles (16)
- Hawaii - Erika Mattich (15)
- Idaho - Tammy Hamilton (17)
- Illinois - Linda Burkholder (17)
- Indiana - Julie James (17)
- Iowa - Kimberly Heck (16)
- Kansas - Melissa Lyczak (16)
- Kentucky - Krista Keith (15)
- Louisiana - Vail Cavalier (18)
- Maine - Dina Duvall (17)
- Maryland - Carla Kemp (18)
- Massachusetts - Christine Lawlor (16)
- Michigan - Cathy McBride (17)
- Minnesota - Kimberly Ess (17)
- Mississippi - Teresa Zapponi (18)
- Missouri - Lisa Logan (16)
- Montana - Leslie Lucas (16)
- Nebraska - Jackie Kuenning (17)
- Nevada - Kimberly Cannon (18)
- New Hampshire - Maureen Murray (17)
- New Jersey - Sheri Drummond (17)
- New Mexico - Eloisa Serna (17)
- New York - Ruth Zakarian (17)
- North Carolina - Janet Freeman (16)
- North Dakota - Lisa Rubin (18)
- Ohio - Jamie Callarik (15)
- Oklahoma - Lorna Webb (16)
- Oregon - Gretchen Thoma (15)
- Pennsylvania - Diane Hoyes (18)
- Rhode Island - Melissa Sciarra (16)
- South Carolina - Beth Woodard (18)
- South Dakota - Karen Hernes (17)
- Tennessee - Cheri Dotson (16)
- Texas - Sheri Sholz (17)
- Utah - Natalie DeGraw (17)
- Vermont - Cindy Gentile (16)
- Virginia - Tina Marrocco (16)
- Washington - Rhonda Monroe (17)
- West Virginia - Kay Scadden (17)
- Wisconsin - Jane Zawada (17)
- Wyoming - Shanna Thompson (15)

== Contestant notes ==
- Kelly Jerles (Georgia) became the only delegate from Miss Teen USA 1983 to compete in the Miss America pageant. She held the Miss Georgia 1987 title and won preliminary swimsuit and non-finalist talent awards at Miss America 1988.
- Ruth Zakarian (New York) competed in the Miss USA 1984 pageant as Miss Teen USA 1983 but did not place. In the early years of the pageant, the Teen titleholder could compete at Miss USA without holding a state title.
- Beth Woodard (South Carolina) - Miss South Carolina USA 1987
- Kris Keim (Arizona) - Miss Arizona USA 1988
- Maureen Murray (New Hampshire) - Miss New York USA 1991 (semi-finalist at Miss USA 1991)
