= Miss Teen USA 2001 =

19th edition of the Miss Teen USA competition

- Date: August 22, 2001
- Presenters: Brian McFayden; Mandy Moore; Ashley Coleman
- Entertainment: Jagged Edge; Better Than Ezra; Usher
- Venue: South Padre Convention Island Center, South Padre Island, Texas
- Broadcaster: CBS; KGBT-TV
- Winner: Marissa Whitley; Missouri
- Congeniality: Sarah Warner; Oregon
- Photogenic: Jillian Dornbush; Indiana

Miss Teen USA 2001, the 19th Miss Teen USA pageant, was televised live from South Padre Convention Island Center, South Padre Island, Texas on 22 August 2001. At the conclusion of the final competition, Marissa Whitley of Missouri was crowned by outgoing queen Jillian Parry of Pennsylvania.

== Host city ==
After hosting the pageant for three consecutive years from 1998 to 2000, officials in Shreveport, Louisiana indicated that they were reluctant to host the pageant for a fourth year because disorganization by the Miss Universe Organization meant that the city lost over $70,000 in expected revenue.

== Results ==
=== Placements ===
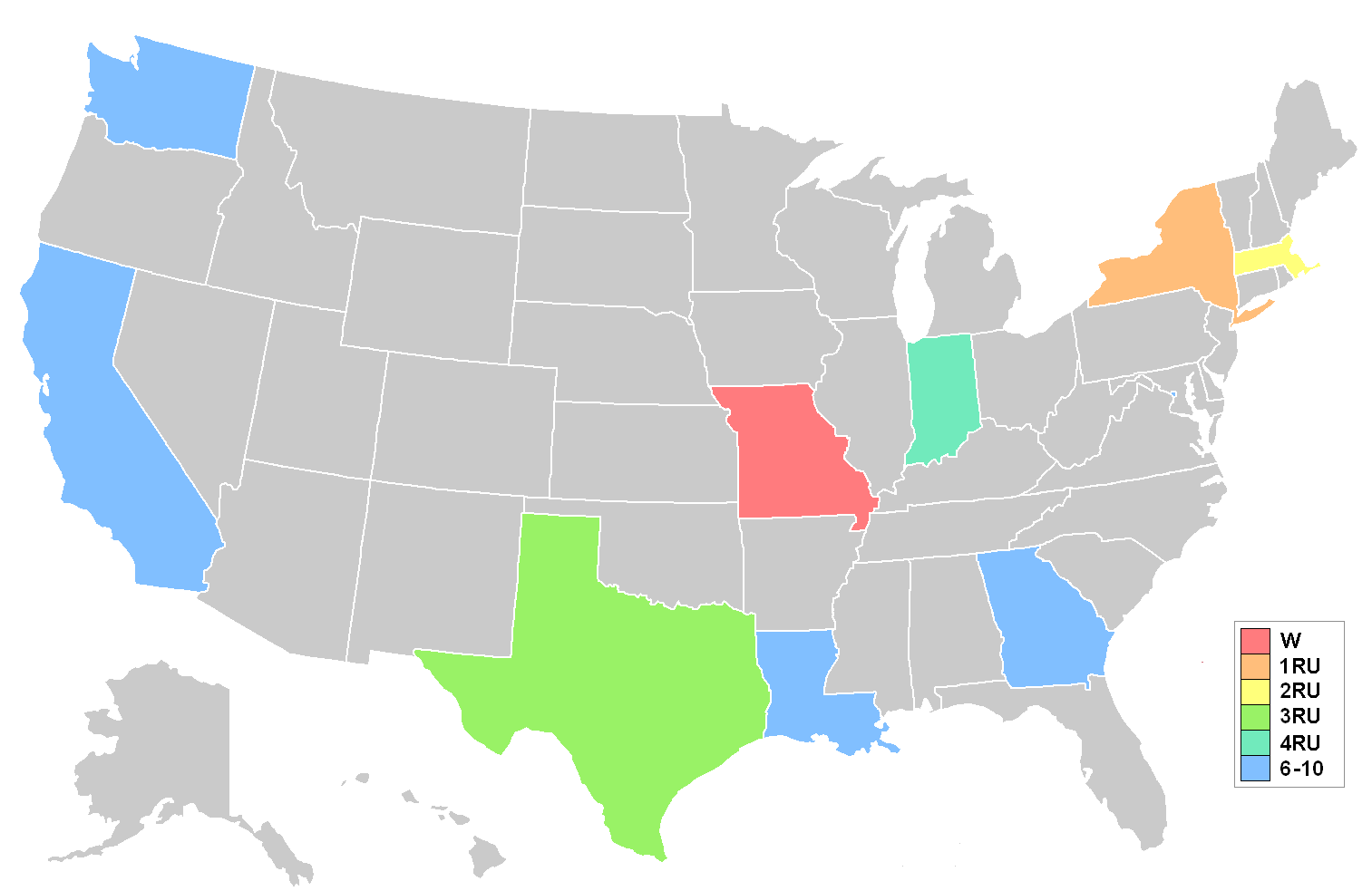
Map showing placements by state

Final results	Contestant
Miss Teen USA 2001	Missouri – Marissa Whitley
1st Runner-Up	(New York (state)) New York – Gloria Almonte
2nd Runner-Up	Massachusetts – Marianna Zaslavsky
3rd Runner-Up	Texas – Katherine Perello
4th Runner-Up	Indiana – Jillian Dornbush
Top 10	California – Casey McClain; (Washington, D.C.) District of Columbia – Jaqueline Drakeford; Louisiana – Paige Egan; (Georgia (U.S. state)) Georgia – Brandy Drake; (Washington (state)) Washington – Shannon Hulbert

=== Special awards ===
Award	Contestant
Miss Congeniality	Oregon – Sarah Warner
Miss Photogenic	Indiana – Jillian Dornbush
Style	Georgia – Brandy Drake
Best in Swimsuit	Texas – Katherine Perello

=== Final competition score ===
State	Swimsuit	Evening Gown	Average
Missouri	9.74(2)	9.83(1)	9.79(1)
New York	9.29(6)	9.40(4)	9.35(4)
Massachusetts	9.37(4)	9.26(6)	9.32(5)
Texas	9.75(1)	9.63(2)	9.69(2)
Indiana	9.55(3)	9.51(3)	9.53(3)
California	9.29(6)	9.34(5)	9.32(6)
Louisiana	9.25(8)	9.25(7)	9.25(7)
Georgia	9.35(5)	8.99(8)	9.17(8)
Washington	9.15(9)	8.75(9)	8.95(9)
District of Columbia	8.53(10)	8.42(10)	8.48(10)

Legend
Winner
First Runner-up
Second Runner-up
Third Runner-up
Fourth Runner-up

- There was a tie (9.32) between Massachusetts and California, but the judges voted for Massachusetts to advance to top five.

== Delegates ==
The Miss Teen USA 2001 delegates were:

- Alabama - Rollins Albritton
- Alaska - Danielle Smith
- Arizona - Eva Marie St. Arnauld
- Arkansas - Lauren Arnold
- California - Casey McClain
- Colorado - Krystal Spurr
- Connecticut - Marie Lynn Piscitelli
- Delaware - Christie Aiken
- (Washington, D.C.) District of Columbia - Jacqueline Drakeford
- Florida - Joanna Candelaria
- (Georgia (U.S. state)) Georgia - Brandy Drake
- Hawaii - Alana Paulo-Tamashiro
- Idaho - Hayley Vancleave
- Illinois - Brittany Richmond
- Indiana - Jillian Dornbush
- Iowa - Ashley Hanson
- Kansas - Lindsey Mackey
- Kentucky - Katherine Faulkner
- Louisiana - Paige Egan
- Maine - Mei-Ling Lam
- Maryland - Precious Grady
- Massachusetts - Marianna Zaslavsky
- Michigan - Chelsea Rudder
- Minnesota - Serene Aandahl
- Mississippi - Ashley Buckman
- Missouri - Marissa Whitley
- Montana - Kristi Krings
- Nebraska - Heidi Lammli
- Nevada - Tahnee Harrison
- New Hampshire - Ashley Lynne Blair
- New Jersey - Erin Abrahamson
- New Mexico - Alaina Castillo
- (New York (state)) New York - Gloria Almonte
- North Carolina - Erin O'Kelley
- North Dakota - Stacey Thomas
- Ohio - Angela Wilson
- Oklahoma - Lindsey Camp
- Oregon - Sarah Warner
- Pennsylvania - Rebecca Schlappich
- Rhode Island - Amy Diaz
- South Carolina - Sarah Medley
- South Dakota - Jessica Herrgott
- Tennessee - Jessica Myers
- Texas - Katherine Perello
- Utah - Nicole Hansen
- Vermont - Heather Moylan
- Virginia - Kathleen Lighthiser
- (Washington (state)) Washington - Shannon Hulbert
- West Virginia - Tara Szerszen
- Wisconsin - Kellyann Langford
- Wyoming - Natalie Koontz

== Contestant notes ==
- Six contestants later won Miss USA state titles:
  - Sarah Medley (South Carolina) - Miss South Carolina USA 2005
  - Erin Abrahamson (New Jersey) - Miss New Jersey USA 2007, originally 1st runner-up but assumed the title after Ashley Harder announced her pregnancy and failing to follow pageant rules
  - Gloria Almonte (New York) - Miss New York USA 2007, semifinalist at Miss Puerto Rico Universe 2009
  - Erin O'Kelley (North Carolina) - Miss North Carolina USA 2007, top 15 semifinalist at Miss USA 2007
  - Amy Diaz (Rhode Island) - Miss Rhode Island USA 2008, top 15 semifinalist at Miss USA 2008
  - Marie-Lynn Piscitelli (Connecticut) - Miss Connecticut USA 2012

== Judges ==
- Rich Cronin
- Elisabeth Filarski
- Veronica Kay
- Ray Munns
- Kerr Smith
- Krista Stegall
- Christina Vidal
