= Gloria Almonte =

American beauty queen

- Born: Gloria Sophia Almonte; July 19, 1983 (age 43); The Bronx, New York, U.S.
- Height: 5 ft 9 in (1.75 m)
- Beauty pageant titleholder
- Title: Miss New York Teen USA 2001; Miss New York USA 2007; Miss Carolina Universe 2009
- Hair color: Brown
- Eye color: Brown
- Major competitions: Miss New York Teen USA 2001 (Winner); Miss Teen USA 2001 (1st Runner-Up); Miss New York USA 2007 (Winner); Miss USA 2007 (Unplaced); Miss Puerto Rico Universe 2009 (Top 20)

Gloria Sophia Almonte (born July 19, 1983) is an American former beauty queen who represented New York at Miss Teen USA 2001 and Miss USA 2007 and Carolina at Miss Puerto Rico Universe 2009.

== Pageant participation ==
=== Miss Teen USA 2001 ===
Almonte won the Miss New York Teen USA 2001 title in late 2000, after placing 2nd runner-up in the same competition the year prior. She represented New York at the Miss Teen USA 2001 pageant held in South Padre Island, Texas on August 22, 2001, where placed 1st runner-up to Marissa Whitley of Missouri. This was New York's first placement since 1996 and their highest since 1988, when Jessica Collins also placed 1st runner-up.

=== Miss USA 2007 ===
In late 2005, Almonte competed in the Miss New York USA 2006 pageant for the first time, placing in the top 15. The following year, she won the 2007 title, becoming the fifth former Miss Teen USA delegate to win the pageant. Almonte succeeded Adriana Diaz, a fellow native of The Bronx who also held the title Miss New York Teen USA and competed in Miss Teen USA 2003. Almonte competed in the Miss USA 2007 pageant, broadcast live from the Kodak Theatre in Los Angeles on March 23, 2007, but failed to place. The pageant was won by Miss Tennessee USA, Rachel Smith, who was also Miss Tennessee Teen USA 2002 and placed in the top 10 of the Miss Teen USA 2002 pageant. Almonte was similar to Miss Georgia Teen USA 1991, Meredith Young, who placed 1st runner-up at Miss Teen USA 1991 and later won the Miss Georgia USA 1999 crown but failed to placed at Miss USA 1999.

=== Miss Puerto Rico Universe 2009 ===
Gloria later represented Carolina at the Miss Puerto Rico Universe 2009 pageant, finishing in the top 20.

Awards and achievements
Preceded by Yaritza Montalvo	Miss Carolina Universe; 2009	Succeeded by Ariana Rodriguez
Preceded by Adriana Diaz	Miss New York USA; 2007	Succeeded by Danielle Roundtree
Preceded by (Texas) Nicole O'Brian	Miss Teen USA 1st Runner-Up; 2001	Succeeded by (California) Jennifer Morgan
Preceded by Tina Casciani	Miss New York Teen USA; 2001	Succeeded by Marley Delduchetto
