= Mary Therese Friel =

American businesswoman and beauty queen (born 1959)

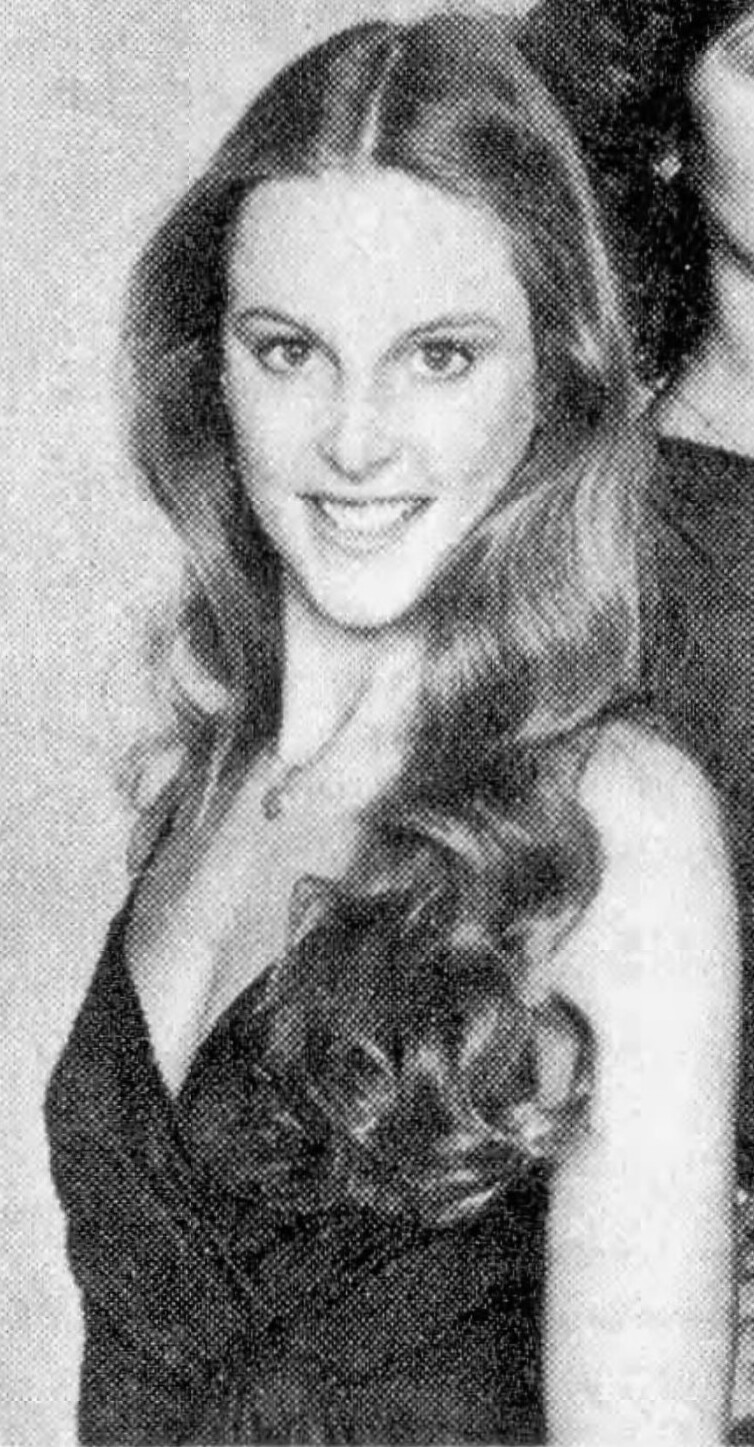
- Friel in 1979
- Born: Mary Therese Friel; February 10, 1959 (age 67); Pittsford, New York
- Spouse: Kent Friel
- Beauty pageant titleholder
- Title: Miss New York USA 1979; Miss USA 1979
- Hair color: Blonde
- Major competitions: Miss New York USA 1979; (Winner); Miss USA 1979; (Winner); Miss Universe 1979; (Top 12)

Mary Therese "Tyger" Friel is an American model, teacher, activist, businesswoman and beauty pageant titleholder who held the title Miss USA 1979.

Friel, who grew up in Pittsford, New York won the titles Miss New York USA and Miss USA. She was later a model, and opened her own modeling agency in 1987. She has trained and represented many models, as well as training beauty pageant participants.

== Biography ==
=== Pageantry ===
Friel, a student at St. John Fisher College, first won the Miss New York USA title in 1978 and went on to represent her state in the Miss USA pageant televised live from Biloxi, Mississippi in April 1979. This was the first of four years that the pageant was held in Biloxi.

Friel placed second overall in the preliminary competition, behind Miss Illinois USA Debra Ann Niego (who would go on to place third runner-up). She won the swimsuit and interview competitions, and placed second in the evening-gown competition to Tracey Goddard of Washington, who would be her first runner-up.

Her victory was New York's second, and came after a string of three consecutive first runner-up placements in the early 1970s.

Friel later represented the United States in the Miss Universe pageant held in Perth, Western Australia in July the same year. Her national costume was a cowgirl. She was a semi-finalist in the pageant, which was won by Maritza Sayalero of Venezuela. This was the first time that the pageant had been held in the Southern Hemisphere.

As Miss New York USA and later as Miss USA, Friel campaigned for numerous charities, including the Special Olympics, the American Heart Association, cerebral palsy, Camp Good Days and Special Times, March of Dimes and muscular dystrophy. She was also an ambassador for the American Lung Association.

Holding the title Miss USA opened opportunities for Friel to meet with various celebrities during her reign. Miss USA and Miss Universe pageants opened a lot of doors for me. I met a lot of people and made a lot of friends. She briefly travelled with singer Julio Iglesias and was invited by Mick Jagger (of the Rolling Stones) to his anniversary concert. She was also a special guest at a Beach Boys concert. She also met Frank Sinatra, Elton John, Kris Kristofferson and Cher. Her reign coincided with the murder of John Lennon, which occurred while she was attending a birthday event for singer Ben Vereen.

=== Post-pageant years ===
After passing on her crown to Shawn Weatherly of South Carolina in May 1980, Friel returned to study, attending Fordham University in New York City. She signed with Ford Modeling Agency and modeled in a wide variety of American cities, as well as in Europe, as well as making the covers of Good Housekeeping and Glamour.

In 1983 Friel decided to take a break from the "high life" and returned to her parents' new hometown, Philadelphia, Pennsylvania, becoming a teacher at a local junior college and resuming her studies at Villanova University.

She also co-authored a book “You can be…the Model You!” and board game by the same name.

Friel was also a coach to Andrea Zingg (née Anderson, now Thompson) of North Wilkesboro, North Carolina (formerly East Rochester, New York). Zingg, known for her constitutional activism durning July 2001, managed to garner both local and national attention for the water crisis facing the farmers and ranchers of Klamath Falls, Oregon and nearby Lower Klamath National Wildlife Refuge. Her tenacity forced then President Bush to create a cabinet position to address the long-standing issue.

=== Modeling agency ===
In 1987, she returned to her hometown area, where she bought a farm in Mendon, New York and started her own modeling agency. Her company started as a small modeling, pageantry and self-development coaching facility for teenage girls and is now a full service modeling agency with a complete training program. She was joined in her endeavours in 1995 by her husband Kent. She is also a pageant coach, and has coached titleholders such as Candace Kuykendall, Miss New York Teen USA 2006.
