= Miss USA 1979 =

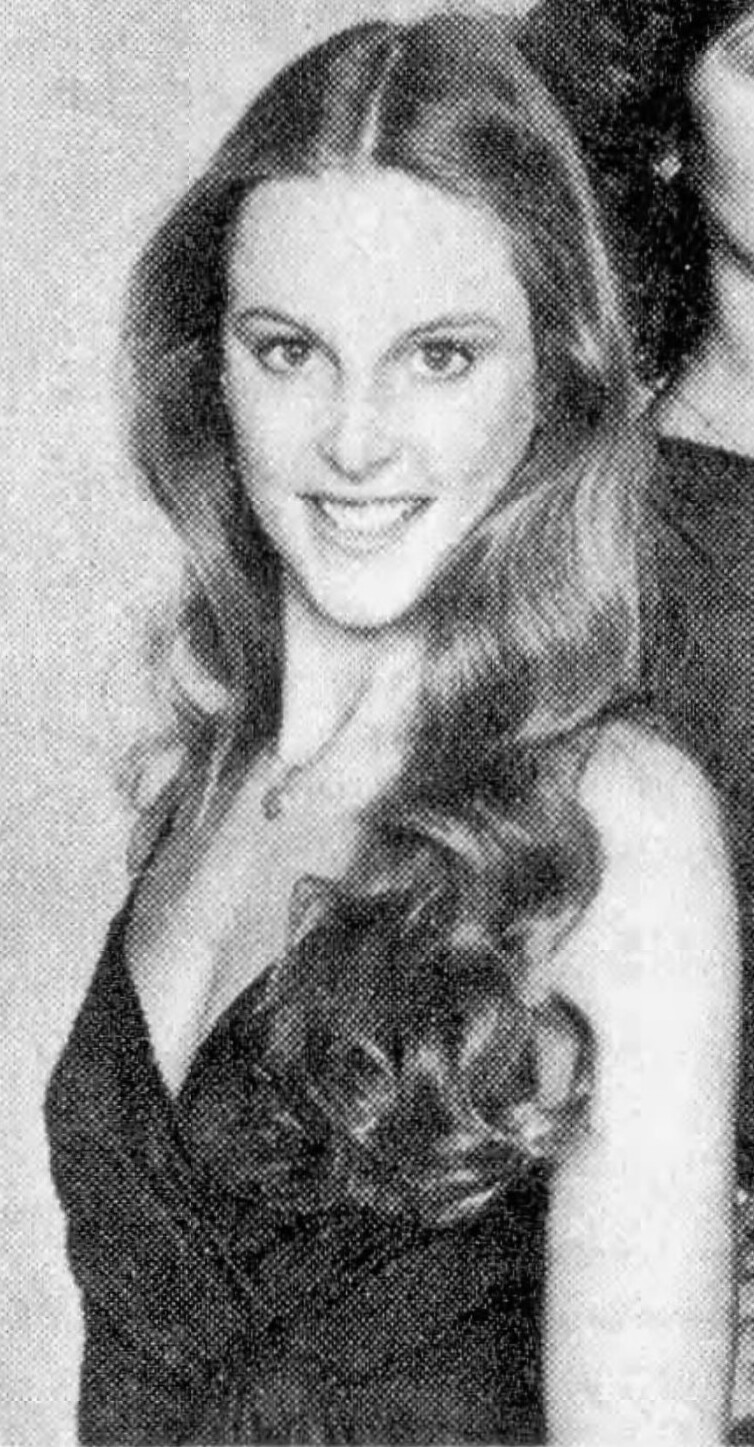
- Mary Therese Friel, Miss USA 1979
- Date: April 30, 1979
- Presenters: Bob Barker; Helen O'Connell; Jayne Kennedy
- Entertainment: Leif Garrett
- Venue: Gulf Coast Convention Center, Biloxi, Mississippi
- Broadcaster: CBS, WJTV
- Entrants: 51
- Placements: 12
- Winner: Mary Therese Friel (New York (state)) New York

Miss USA 1979 was the 28th Miss USA pageant, televised live by CBS from the Gulf Coast Convention Center in Biloxi, Mississippi on April 30, 1979.

The pageant was won by Mary Therese Friel of New York, who was crowned by outgoing titleholder Judi Andersen of Hawaii. Friel was the second woman from New York to win the Miss USA title, and went on to place as a semi-finalist at Miss Universe 1979.

== Results ==
Final Results	Contestant
Miss USA 1979	(New York (state)) New York - Mary Therese Friel
1st Runner-Up	(Washington (state)) Washington - Tracey Goddard
2nd Runner-Up	Hawaii - Leialoha Ma'a
3rd Runner-Up	Illinois - Debra Niego
4th Runner-Up	Mississippi - Laurie Kimbrough
Top 12	Arizona - Ana Maria Rubert; California - Linda Fogarty; Massachusetts - Monica Magnus; North Carolina - Dianne Jamerson; Texas - Anne Hinnant; Virginia - Betsy Bott; Wisconsin - Kathryn Wituschek

== Delegates ==
The Miss USA 1979 delegates were:

- Alabama – Rose Burch
- Alaska – Kim Fidler
- Arizona – Ana Maria Rubert
- Arkansas – Cynthia Caldwell
- California - Linda Fogarty
- Colorado – Jene Nelson
- Connecticut – Mary Beth Lombardi
- Delaware – Lisa Toothman
- (Washington, D.C.) District of Columbia – Cynthia Ramsay
- Florida – Penny Sheridan
- (Georgia (U.S. state)) Georgia – Debbie Freeman
- Hawaii – Leialoha Ma'a
- Idaho – Lori Jukich
- Illinois – Debra Niego
- Indiana – Debra Hayes
- Iowa – Teri Rees
- Kansas – Linda Shields
- Kentucky – Linda Passmore
- Louisiana – Lisa Anderson
- Maine – Valerie Crooker
- Maryland – Jean Bourne
- Massachusetts – Monica Magnus
- Michigan – Susan James
- Minnesota – Cynthia Lee
- Mississippi – Laurie Kimbrough
- Missouri – Virginia Dean
- Montana – Jurette Sindelar
- Nebraska – Rhonda Lundberg
- Nevada – Aleasha Magleby
- New Hampshire – Patricia Brous
- New Jersey – Robin Senatore
- New Mexico – Michele Sandoval
- (New York (state)) New York – Mary Therese Friel
- North Carolina – Dianne Jamerson
- North Dakota – Renae Hermanson
- Ohio – Carolyn Houlihan
- Oklahoma – Susan Gibson
- Oregon – Katie Fitzpatrick
- Pennsylvania – Maureen Starinsky
- Rhode Island – Theresa Patterson
- South Carolina – Janice McDonald
- South Dakota – Noelle de Saint Gall
- Tennessee – Sandy Nuismer
- Texas – Anne Hinnant
- Utah – Vicky Scott
- Vermont – Kathi Rechsteiner
- Virginia – Betsy Bott
- (Washington (state)) Washington – Tracey Goddard
- West Virginia – Candy Boggs
- Wisconsin – Kathryn Wituschek
- Wyoming – Pam Williams

== Judges ==
- Maud Adams
- Jim Davis
- Eileen Ford
- Beverly Garland
- Karen Graham
- Dong Kingman
- Trini Lopez
- Alfred Allan Lewis
- Earl Monroe
- Leslie Nielsen
- Kimberly Tomes
- Edward Villella
