= Seven at Eleven =

- Presented by: George De Witt
- Country of origin: United States
- Original language: English

Original release
- Network: NBC

Seven at Eleven is an American comedy/variety show that aired live on NBC Monday and Wednesday night from 11:00 pm to midnight Eastern time from May 28, 1951 to June 27, 1951 on the nights when Broadway Open House wasn't on.

== Regulars ==
- Sid Gould
- George Frees
- Sammy Petrillo
- Dorothy Keller
- Jane Scott
- Denise Lor
- Betsy Luster
- Jack Stanton
- Jackie Loughery
- Herbie Faye
- Milton Delugg and his Sextet
