= Miss USA 1952 =

1st Miss USA pageant

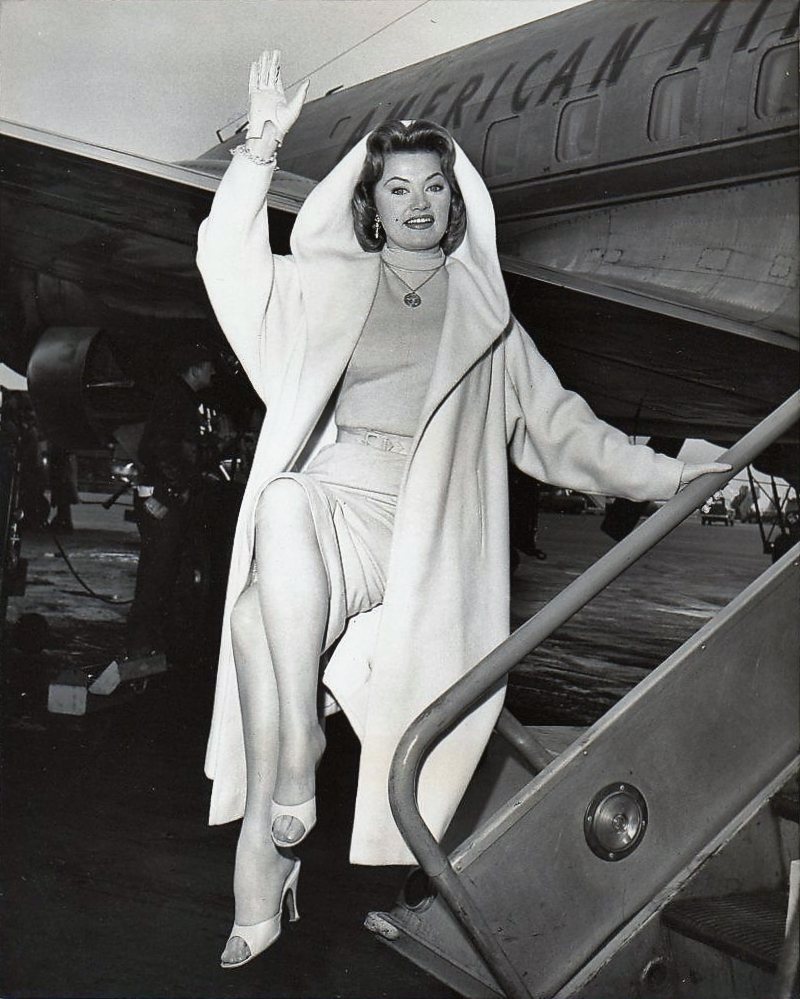
- Jackie Loughery, Miss USA 1952
- Date: June 27, 1952
- Venue: Long Beach Municipal Auditorium, Long Beach, California
- Entrants: 42
- Placements: 10
- Winner: Jackie Loughery; New York
- Congeniality: Valerie Jackson; Montana

Miss USA 1952 was the first Miss USA pageant, held at the Long Beach Municipal Auditorium in Long Beach, California on June 27, 1952.

At the end of the event, American actress and Miss America 1941 Rosemary LaPlanche crowned Jackie Loughery of New York as Miss USA 1952. It is the first victory of New York in the pageant's history. Contestants from 42 states competed in this year's pageant.

== Results ==
=== Placements ===
Placement	Contestant
Miss USA 1952	(New York (state)) New York – Jackie Loughery
1st Runner-up	Louisiana – Jeanne Thompson
2nd Runner-up	Missouri – Carolyn Corlew
3rd Runner-up	Tennessee – Jean Harper
4th Runner-up	Oklahoma – Trula Birchfield
Top 10	Indiana – Virginia Johnson; Michigan – Judy Hatula; Minnesota – Jodell Stirmlinger; Montana – Valerie Jackson; New Jersey – Ruth Hampton

=== Special awards ===
Award	Contestant
Miss Congeniality	Montana – Valerie Jackson

== Contestants ==
42 contestants competed for the title.

State	Name	Age (Note: Ages at the time of the pageant)	Hometown	Notes
Alabama	Doris Edwards	23	Gadsden	
Arizona	Charlene Hendricks	18	Tempe	
Arkansas	Barbara Wathen	20	Jonesboro	
California	Gloria Maxwell	20	Los Angeles	
Colorado	Josephine Barbie	22	Colorado Springs	
Connecticut	Jo Kuhlmann	22	Hartford	
Delaware	Sue Langton	23	Wilmington	
Florida	Yvonne Pearis	23	Jacksonville	
(Georgia (U.S. state)) Georgia	Betty Jane Wood	18	Decatur	
Idaho	Cherrie Jean Lindsey	20	Idaho Falls	
Illinois	Sherry Matulis	19	Peoria	
Indiana	Virginia Johnson	19	Indianapolis	
Kansas	Bette Renick	18	Liberal	
Kentucky	Jean Tingle	19	Lexington	
Louisiana	Jeanne Thompson	21	Baton Rouge	Later competed at Miss USA 1953. Previously Miss Louisiana 1951
Maine	Jean Marie Lemire	20	Old Town	
Massachusetts	Vel Dorne	24	Boston	
Michigan	Judy Hatula	19	Detroit	
Minnesota	Jodell Stirmlinger	20	St. Paul	
Mississippi	Carolyn Thomas	20	Jackson	
Missouri	Carolyn Corlew	18	Sikeston	
Montana	Patricia McGinty	21	Missoula	
Nevada	Barbara Jean Clark	19	Las Vegas	
New Jersey	Ruth Jane Hampton	20	Merchantville	
New Mexico	Kay Nail	20	Albuquerque	
(New York (state)) New York	Jackie Loughery	21	Brooklyn	Semi-finalist at Miss Universe 1952
North Carolina	Doris Stanley	23	Greensboro	
North Dakota	Gloria Rowe	26	Fargo	
Ohio	Margie Broering	18	Cincinnati	
Oklahoma	Trula Birchfield	21	Oklahoma City	
Oregon	Beth Bailey	27	La Grande	
Pennsylvania	Jeanne Ferguson	22	Philadelphia	
Rhode Island	Delores Selinder	22	Providence	
South Carolina	Margie Allen	–	Spartanburg	
South Dakota	Marlene Rieb	20	Parkston	
Tennessee	Jean Harper	18	Memphis	Previously Miss Tennessee 1951; Top 15 at Miss America 1952
Texas	Charlene McClary	25	Houston	
Utah	Carol Jean Isbell	20	Salt Lake City	
Vermont	Elizabeth Whitcomb	18	Essex Junction	
Virginia	Elizabeth Glenn	24	Roanoke	
(Washington (state)) Washington	Adele Slaybaugh	18	Kennewick	
Wisconsin	Jeannie Eleanor Huston	20	Milwaukee	
