= Pardners =

1956 film by Norman Taurog

- Directed by: Norman Taurog
- Written by: Mervin Houser; Jerry Davis
- Produced by: Paul Jones
- Starring: Dean Martin; Jerry Lewis
- Cinematography: Daniel L. Fapp
- Edited by: Archie Marshek
- Music by: Frank De Vol
- Color process: Technicolor
- Production company: York Pictures Corporation
- Distributed by: Paramount Pictures
- Release date: July 25, 1956
- Running time: 88 minutes
- Country: United States
- Language: English
- Box office: $3.6 million (US); 1,817,503 admissions (France)

Pardners is a 1956 American comedy western film starring the comedy team of Martin and Lewis. It was released on July 25, 1956, by Paramount Pictures.

A western spoof directed by Norman Taurog, this was the penultimate film of the 16 screen collaborations between Dean Martin and Jerry Lewis before their breakup. The cast also includes Agnes Moorehead, Lori Nelson and Jackie Loughery.

== Plot ==
One night in 1885, Masked raiders led by Sam Hollis attack the "K" Ranch, where owner Wade Kingsley and partner Slim Mosley bravely defend their property after Matilda Kingsley and infant son Wade Jr. safely return east to New York, her hometown. Wade and Slim are murdered, but vow before they die that their sons someday will avenge them.

25 years later in 1910, the wealthy Matilda receives a visit from her niece Carol and cowboy Slim Mosley Jr., who has come to New York City to compete in a rodeo. They intend to use Slim's earnings to buy a prized bull called Cuddles and take him back west to replenish the K Ranch's stock.

Sweet but inept Wade Jr. has always wanted to be a cowboy. He goes to the rodeo, where his bungling interference costs Slim first prize. To make amends, Wade buys the bull for Slim and accompanies them back west by train.

After a while, Slim warms to Wade and agrees to become partners, like their dads. Out west, to keep townsfolk from mocking the tenderfoot, Slim decides to introduce Wade to one and all as "Killer Jones," a tough hombre. Due to his heroic actions in stopping a runaway stagecoach, with Slim performing the actual heroics, Wade ends up being elected sheriff, impressing dance hall girl Dolly Riley.

Ranch hand Pete Rio is secretly working with banker Dan Hollis, who is every bit as corrupt as his father was. Dan's got his eyes on the K Ranch so he can sell the land to the government, which wants to build a dam. Dan tries proposing marriage to Carol, but she rejects him, so he announces that the bank will begin foreclosure proceedings against the ranch.

In disguise, Wade infiltrates the gang of masked raiders. He is caught and bound to a chair, strapped to sticks of dynamite, and when Slim comes to his rescue, Dan Hollis knocks him cold. All seems lost until the boys manage a last-second escape. Dan is dealt with accordingly, after which the pardners and their romantic partners celebrate their success.

== Cast ==
- Dean Martin as Slim Mosely / Slim Jr.
- Jerry Lewis as Wade Kingsley / Wade Jr.
- Agnes Moorehead as Matilda Kingsley
- Lori Nelson as Carol
- Jeff Morrow as Rio
- John Baragrey as Dan and Sam Hollis
- Jackie Loughery as Dolly
- Milton Frome as the Butler
- Lon Chaney Jr. as Whitey
- Lee Van Cleef as Gus
- Jack Elam as Pete
- Bob Steele as Shorty
- Emory Parnell as Col. Hart

== Production ==
The film was shot from November 21, 1955, through January 28, 1956. It is loosely based on a Bing Crosby film, Rhythm on the Range (1936), which was also directed by Norman Taurog, and it was filmed under the working title of Where Men are Men. During production, Lewis filmed a documentary in 16mm.

Four songs by Sammy Cahn and Jimmy van Heusen are featured in the film, including Martin and Lewis performing the title number together.

During the weeks in which Pardners was filmed, rumors abounded about the impending demise of the Martin and Lewis partnership. When "The End" title appears on the screen, Martin and Lewis address the audience and exclaim: "We're not ready for 'The End' yet!" They then shoot the letters off the screen. The stars continue to address the audience, addressing one another as "Dean" and "Jer," insisting how much they enjoy making pictures.

== Release ==
The same day that this film was released to theaters, Martin and Lewis made their last appearance together as a team at New York's Copacabana.

This film was rereleased in 1965 on a double bill with another Martin and Lewis film, Living It Up.

== Home media ==
Pardners was included on a five-film DVD set, the Dean Martin and Jerry Lewis Collection: Volume Two, released on June 5, 2007.
