= The Delicate Delinquent =

1957 film by Don McGuire

- Directed by: Don McGuire
- Written by: Don McGuire; Jerry Lewis (uncredited)
- Produced by: Jerry Lewis
- Starring: Jerry Lewis; Darren McGavin; Martha Hyer
- Cinematography: Haskell B. Boggs
- Edited by: Howard Smith
- Music by: Buddy Bregman
- Distributed by: Paramount Pictures
- Release date: June 6, 1957
- Running time: 101 minutes
- Country: United States
- Language: English
- Budget: $500,000
- Box office: $3.4 million (US and Canadian rentals); 803,522 admissions (France)

The Delicate Delinquent is an American VistaVision comedy film starring Jerry Lewis, released on June 6, 1957, by Paramount Pictures. It was the first film to star Lewis without his longtime partner Dean Martin and marked Lewis' debut as a producer and screenwriter.

== Plot ==
Janitor Sidney L. Pythias is mistaken for a gang member and arrested along with three juvenile delinquents, Artie, Monk and Harry.

Police officer Mike Damon believes that he can help a wayward youth as a cop had once done for him. He is given a month by Captain Riley to set a boy straight, provided that he allow socialite Martha Henshaw assist him in the effort.

Sidney's secret ambition is to be a policeman. He also wants to impress Patricia, a student nurse who lives in his building, by making something of himself. Mike and Martha bicker while working with Sidney, who is permitted to attend the police academy, over the objections of Artie, Monk and Harry.

Artie is accidentally shot by a gun in Sidney's possession, endangering his future with the police force, but it is Monk who is responsible. Cleared of all blame, Sidney becomes a cop, determined to set a good example for youths, while Mike and Martha fall in love.

== Cast ==
- Jerry Lewis as Sidney Pythias
- Darren McGavin as Mike Damon
- Martha Hyer as Martha Henshaw
- Horace McMahon as Capt. Riley
- Mary Webster as Patricia
- Richard Bakalyan as Artie
- Robert Ivers as Monk
- Joseph Corey as Harry
- Emory Parnell as Sgt. Levitch
- Frank Gorshin as Wise Guy on Street
- The Great Togo as himself
- Robert Fuller as Jerry Lewis’ stunt double

== Production ==
- The Delicate Delinquent was filmed from September 5 through October 12 of 1956 and is based upon a script entitled Damon and Pythias inspired by the Damon and Pythias legend. Darren McGavin stepped in to fill the role of a police officer that was originally written for Dean Martin, who refused to play the role, ending the Martin and Lewis partnership. Although the credits show a copyright date of 1956, the film was released the following year, a common practice in Hollywood.
- Lewis, who also produced the film, played a juvenile, although he was 30 years old at the time.
- The romantic interest was provided mainly by actress Martha Hyer, who in 1966 married Hal B. Wallis, producer of the Martin and Lewis films. Hyer's wardrobe was created by longtime Paramount costume designer Edith Head.
- Comedian/impressionist Frank Gorshin makes an early dramatic appearance as a gang member.

== Box office ==
The film cost just under $500,000 to produce, but it grossed about $6 million.

== Re-release ==
The Delicate Delinquent was rereleased in 1962 on a double bill with another Lewis film, The Sad Sack (1957).

== Home media ==
The film was released on DVD on October 12, 2004, and again on July 22, 2019.
