= If Tomorrow Comes (film) =

1971 American TV film

If Tomorrow Comes is a 1971 American TV film. It was originally entitled The Glass Hammer then My Husband, the Enemy but was retitled after protests. It was broadcast as an ABC Movie of the Week.

== Plot ==
An American girl marries a Japanese-American just before the attack on Pearl Harbor.

== Cast ==
- Patty Duke as Eileen Phillips
- Frank Michael Liu as David Tayaneka
- Anne Baxter as Miss Cramer
- James Whitmore as Frank Phillips
- Pat Hingle as Sheriff
- Mako as Tadashi
- John McLiam as Father Miller
- Michael McGreevey as Harlan Phillips
- Bert Remsen as Coslow

== Reception ==
The Los Angeles Times called it "worthy, painful".
