= The Clown and the Kid =

1961 drama film directed by Edward L. Cahn

- Directed by: Edward L. Cahn
- Written by: Jerry Sackheim; Herbert Abbott Spiro
- Produced by: Edward Small (executive); Robert E. Kent
- Starring: John Lupton; Michael McGreevey; Mary Webster
- Cinematography: Gilbert Warrenton
- Edited by: Irving Berlin
- Music by: Richard LaSalle
- Production company: Harvard Film Corporation
- Distributed by: United Artists
- Release date: December 27, 1961
- Running time: 65 minutes
- Country: United States
- Language: English

The Clown and the Kid is a 1961 American drama film directed by Edward L. Cahn and starring John Lupton, Michael McGreevey and Mary Webster.

== Plot ==
When Moko the Clown dies, his orphaned son Shawn befriends a mysterious wanderer named Peter. The two become close friends and partners until a closely guarded secret tears them apart.

== Cast ==
- John Lupton as Peter
- Michael McGreevey as Shawn
- Don Keefer as Moko
- Mary Webster as Robin
- Barry Kelley as Barker
- Edith Evanson as Mother Superior
- Ken Mayer as Trooper
- Peggy Stewart as Sister Grace
- James Parnell as Second Patrolman
- Charles G. Martin as Daly
- Mary Adams as Mother Superior (uncredited)
- Victor French as Patrolman #1 (uncredited)
