= Eighteen and Anxious =

1957 film

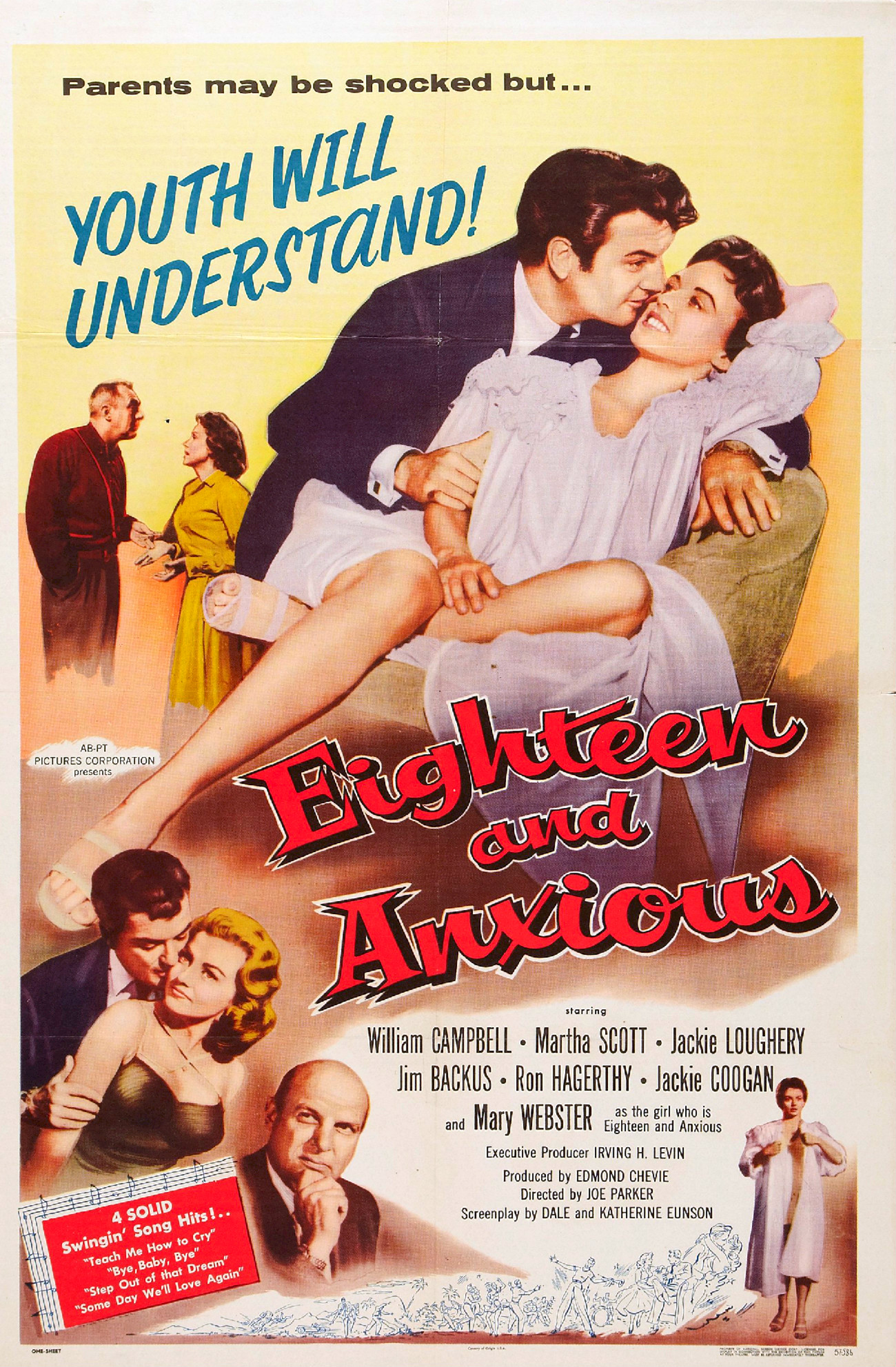
- Theatrical release poster
- Directed by: Joe Parker
- Screenplay by: Katherine Albert; Dale Eunson
- Produced by: Edmond Chevie
- Starring: William Campbell; Martha Scott; Jackie Loughery; Jim Backus; Ron Hagerthy; Jackie Coogan
- Cinematography: Sam Leavitt
- Edited by: Douglas Stewart
- Music by: Leith Stevens
- Production companies: AB-PT Pictures
- Distributed by: Republic Pictures
- Release date: November 15, 1957
- Running time: 93 minutes
- Country: United States
- Language: English

Eighteen and Anxious is a 1957 American drama film directed by Joe Parker and written by Katherine Eunson and Dale Eunson. The film stars William Campbell, Martha Scott, Jackie Loughery, Jim Backus, Ron Hagerthy, and Jackie Coogan. The film was released on November 15, 1957, by Republic Pictures.

== Plot ==
Judy Graham, just 18 years old, elopes to Mexico with boyfriend Jack, only to have him killed there. Judy returns to the disapproval of mother Lottie and stepfather Harvey, as well as disbelief from Jack's parents, the Baynes, who doubt the girl's story and accuse her of loose morals.

Judy realizes she is pregnant. Her older friend Ava and she go to Tijuana to find the marriage license, but no paperwork for a "Bayne" is found. She eventually gives birth to a baby boy, but does not wish to see him. Lottie has a change of heart and cares for the child. Jack's parents discover the wedding license in their son's belongings, mistakenly listed as "Payne", and forgive Judy, but she is appalled by their hypocrisy.

After finding a job and beginning a relationship with a boy, Danny Fuller, a smooth talker named Pete Bailey seduces her, only to jilt Judy on what she believes is her wedding day. A car she mistook as a marriage gift is actually a goodbye from Pete, who abandons her. A distraught Judy gets into a car crash. Danny rescues her from the wreck, expressing his hope that everyone will make up to Judy for their previous behavior toward her.

== Cast ==
- William Campbell as Pete Bailey
- Martha Scott as Lottie Graham
- Jackie Loughery as Ava Norton
- Jim Backus as Harvey Graham
- Ron Hagerthy as Danny Fuller
- Jackie Coogan as Harold 'Eager' Beaver
- Mary Webster as Judy Graham Bayne
- Charlotte Wynters as Mrs. Warren
- Yvonne Craig as Gloria Dorothy McCormick
- Katherine Barrett as Mrs. Wayne
- Damian O'Flynn as John Bayne
- Trustin Howard as Morty
- Hal Smith as Abortionist
- Joyce Andre as Girl #1
