= Denise Lor =

American actress (1929–2015)

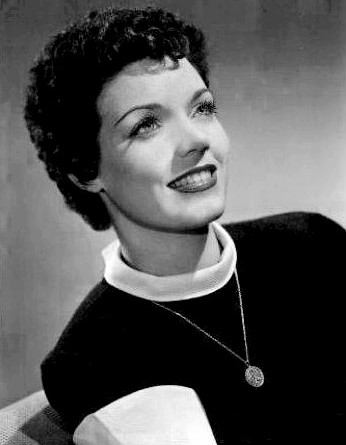
- Lor in 1953
- Born: Denise Jeanne Briault; May 3, 1929; Los Angeles, California, U.S.
- Died: September 27, 2015 (aged 86)
- Other name: Denise Lor Horine
- Occupations: Singer, actress
- Children: 2

Denise Lor (born Denise Jeanne Briault; May 3, 1929 – September 27, 2015) was an American popular singer and actress. She was a featured artist on The Garry Moore Show. In 1951, she appeared in the short-lived variety show Seven at Eleven.

Cast of The Garry Moore Show in 1953. Clockwise from left: Garry Moore, announcer Ken Carlson, Durward Kirby, Denise Lor.

== Early years ==
Of French parentage and born in Los Angeles, Lor moved with her mother to Jackson Heights, Queens, New York at the age of 5, following her father's death. She graduated from Newtown High School and took art courses at night at Cooper Union, intent on becoming a commercial artist, while waitressing during the day at a Schrafft's restaurant. She also had a love for singing, saving up money to do it professionally. She believed her chance to sing in Sonja Henie's New York ice show at the Center Theatre to be her big break. She also decided to use her mother's maiden name, Lor, as her stage name.

== Television ==
In addition to her work on The Garry Moore Show, Lor was a regular on The Big Payoff and Droodles. She made her dramatic TV debut on Appointment with Adventure on August 14, 1955.

== Personal appearances ==
After Lor's association with The Garry Moore Show ended, she performed in night clubs and similar venues. In the early 1970s, she worked in touring stock theater.

== Stage ==
Lor appeared in numerous musical comedies including Gypsy, Annie and Sweeney Todd.

== Recording ==
Lor's main hit song was "If I Give My Heart to You", which charted in 1954 at the same time as another recording of the same song by Doris Day.

== Personal life ==
Lor married and subsequently divorced TV director and singer Jay Martin, with whom she had sons, Ron and Denis. They had met when she was singing on The Garry Moore Show at CBS, where he was an associate director. Her second marriage was to writer Charles Horine (aka Chuck Horner).
