= Master of the World (1961 film) =

1961 film by William Witney

- Theatrical release poster
- Directed by: William Witney
- Screenplay by: Richard Matheson
- Based on: Robur the Conqueror; 1886 novel Master of the World; 1904 novel by Jules Verne
- Produced by: James H. Nicholson
- Starring: Vincent Price; Charles Bronson; Henry Hull; Mary Webster; David Frankham
- Cinematography: Gil Warrenton
- Edited by: Anthony Carras
- Music by: Les Baxter
- Color process: Magnacolor
- Production company: Alta Vista Productions
- Distributed by: American International Pictures
- Release date: May 24, 1961
- Running time: 102 minutes
- Country: United States
- Language: English
- Box office: $1.7 million

Master of the World is a 1961 colour science fiction film based on the 1886 Jules Verne novel Robur the Conqueror and its 1904 sequel Master of the World, with a screenplay written by Richard Matheson. The film stars Vincent Price, Charles Bronson and Henry Hull and was directed by William Witney and produced by Samuel Z. Arkoff, Anthony Carras (who also edited) and James H. Nicholson. American International Pictures released the film as a double feature with a gorilla movie titled Konga.

== Plot ==
A man known only as Robur shoots down and takes aboard his airship, Prudent, his daughter Dorothy, her fiancé Evans, all of whom were exploring a mountain crater in their powered balloon, along with US government agent Strock, who had hired them to look for signs of volcanic activity. The supposed eruption was caused by Robur working on his airship, the Albatross; he had also inadvertently broadcast a biblical passage over a voice amplifier, stirring religious fears among the citizenry of the nearby town. Robur has been traversing the globe in his airship with the obsessive aim of enforcing peace on the world by virtue of his superior military capabilities. He has a loyal crew of like-minded, equally fanatical idealists. The captives learn how his ship operates, and about his technical advances, including generation of electrical power by crossing "lines of magnetic force", a quaint but accurate description of a dynamo's operating principle. The prisoners are anxious to escape, but don't fully trust Strock, who appears at times to side with Robur. After saving Evans' life, Strock explains that his oath of loyalty to Robur was insincere, and that as a captive he feels no compunction to behave as a gentleman.

Robur proceeds to destroy various nations' means of making war, but a desert conflict wounds Robur and damages the Albatross. After the airship succeeds in escaping and Robur recovers, the ship anchors at an island for repairs, where the captives rig the armoury with an explosive charge. All escape down the anchor line except Strock, who follows while being shot at by the crew. First Strock, then Evans, work at cutting the anchor line, finally releasing the airship, which is damaged beyond repair moments later when the gunpowder explodes. Robur orders his crew to abandon ship, but they choose to ignore his final order, and gather in his quarters while he reads from Isaiah 2:4 (the "swords into plowshares" passage), reminding them of their pledge to try to rid the world of war. The ship, along with Robur and his crew, crashes into the ocean and explodes, while the captives watch, injured but alive, from the shore.

== Cast ==
- Vincent Price as Robur
- Charles Bronson as John Strock
- Henry Hull as Prudent
- Mary Webster as Dorothy Prudent
- David Frankham as Philip Evans
- Richard Harrison as Alistair (Helmsman)
- Vito Scotti as Topage (Airship Chef)
- Wally Campo as First Mate Turner
- Ken Terrell as Crewman Shanks
- Gordon Jones as Talkative Morgantown townsperson (uncredited)

== Difference from the novels ==
The opening scene of the movie is in a fictionalized Morgantown, Pennsylvania whereas the novel took place in Morganton, North Carolina.

== Production ==
The film was an attempt by American International Pictures to create a prestigious epic adventure along the lines of Around the World in 80 Days (1956). While it boasted a larger cast and more location work than was the norm for AIP (it was the studio's biggest budget picture to date) the film still utilized footage taken from other films: the reopening miniature shot of Elizabethan London was from Laurence Olivier's film Henry V (1944), standing-in for Victorian London, with the Albatross airship superimposed over the top of the scene; additional shots of Albatross destroying both sides in a naval engagement were created in the same manner, reusing Battle of Trafalgar footage from the end of That Hamilton Woman (1941). The film also reused footage from Zoltan Korda's The Four Feathers (1939) for the airship's north African battle engagement.

The script combined elements of both of Jules Verne's novels, Robur the Conqueror and its sequel, Master of the World. Robur, genius, inventor and, in this instance, creator of the powered heavier-than-air craft Albatross, with his hand-picked crew, chooses to use weapons of war to force the governments of the world to lay down their arms and live in peace.

The special effects crew included Wah Chang and Gene Warren.

Master of the World was Charles Bronson's first foray as the heroic romantic leading man in a theatrical film; he had usually appeared on television or played supporting roles in movies, often in villainous roles.

The studio originally announced that Price's co-star would be Mark Damon, his co-star from House of Usher. Shortly thereafter Damon was replaced by David Frankham.

Vincent Price is reported to have considered the role of Robur as one of his personal favourites. The 2021 Kino Lorber Blu-ray release of the film includes an audio commentary by Tom Weaver, Lucy Chase Williams, David Schecter and Richard Heft.

== Proposed sequel ==
According to Filmfax magazine, a sequel to Master of the World, to have been called Stratofin, was considered by AIP. A concept model of the Terror, Robur's new land-sea-air vehicle, was built (the article included a picture of the model, which did not survive). The film, however, was never made, reportedly due to the manner in which Richard Matheson and his cohorts combined various Jules Verne story elements from both Robur novels for the Master of the World, which would have caused insurmountable continuity issues between the first film and the sequel.

== Influence ==
The movie served as an influence on Star Trek creator Gene Roddenberry who conceived of a television show featuring an airship in the late 1800s with a multi-ethnic crew that went around the globe fighting injustice and righting wrongs.
