= Mary Webster (American actress) =

American actress (1935–2017)

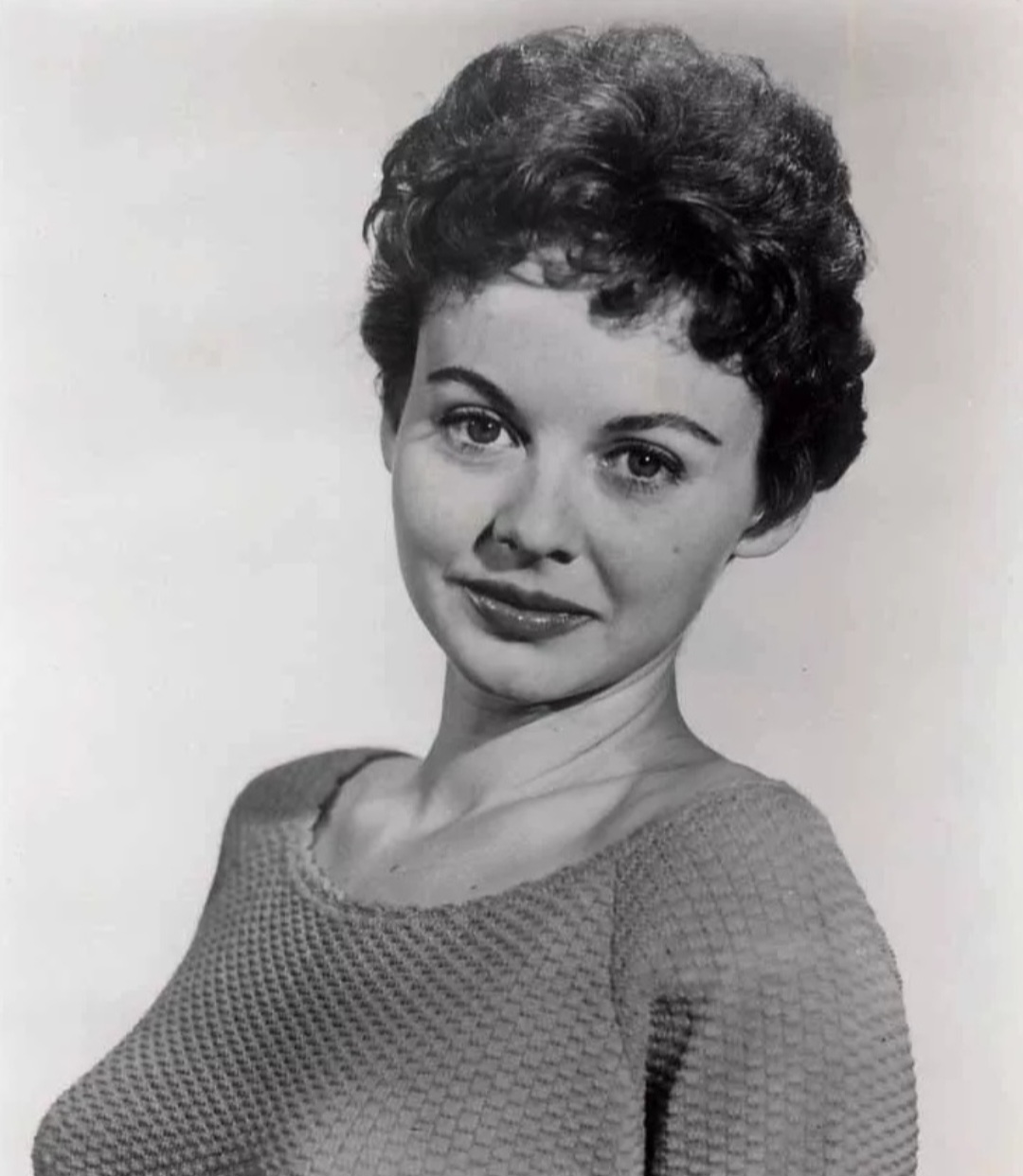
- Webster in The Charlie Farrell Show (1956)
- Born: March 13, 1935; Chicago, Illinois, U.S.
- Died: January 23, 2017 (aged 81); Dallas, Texas, U.S.
- Occupation: Actress
- Years active: 1955–1963

Mary Webster (March 13, 1935 – January 23, 2017) was an American actress of film and television.

== Early life ==
Born in Chicago, Illinois, Webster was raised in Santa Monica, California, and finished high school there. She studied acting at California's Pasadena Playhouse in its theatre arts program.

== Career ==
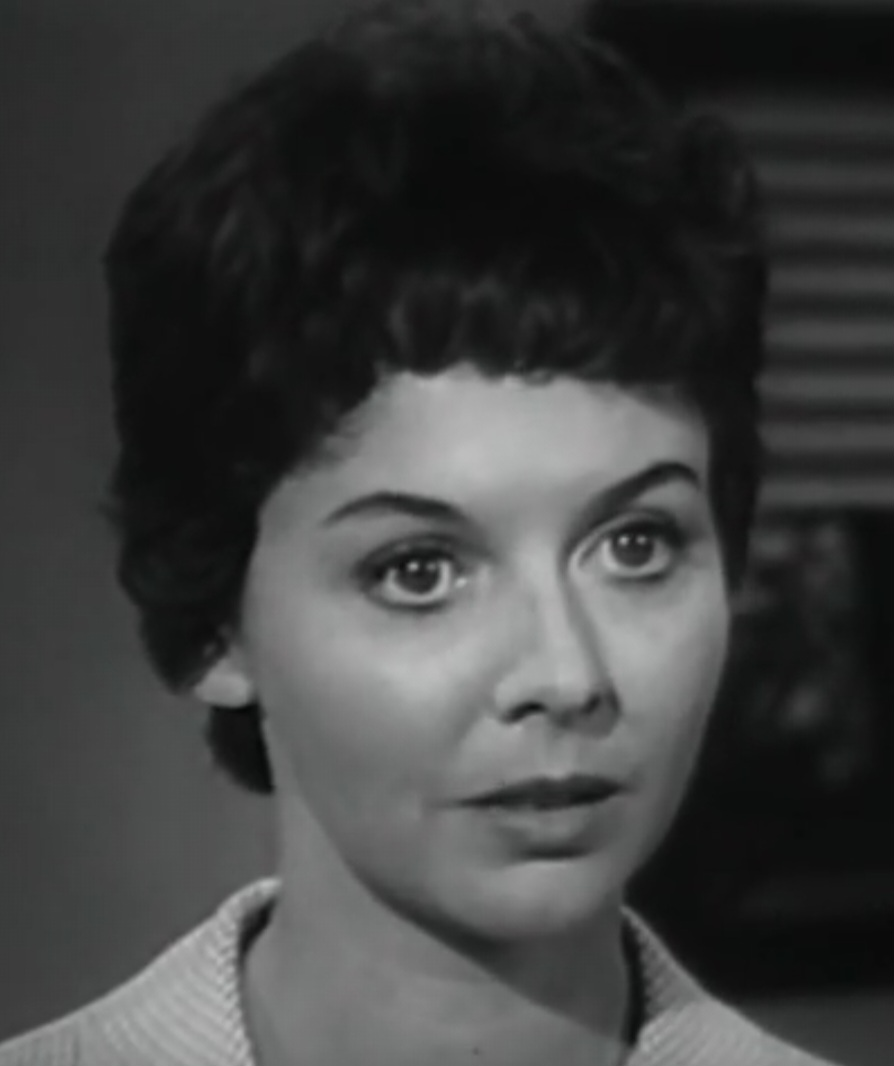
Webster in an episode of Lock-Up (1960)

Webster's first film role came in 1957 as the love interest in The Delicate Delinquent, with Jerry Lewis in his first solo film following his Martin and Lewis years. Webster then appeared in The Tin Star, her first foray into the Western genre, carried into many television roles. Webster co-starred in Eighteen and Anxious (1957), and in 1961, she appeared in the science-fiction film Master of the World with Vincent Price.

Aside from Westerns, Webster appeared in various television shows, including two The Twilight Zone episodes "A Passage for Trumpet" and "Death Ship", both of which starred Jack Klugman.

On Broadway, Webster appeared in Dear Charles (1954). She also made national tours with the companies of The Desperate Hours and Mister Roberts.

== Personal life ==
Webster retired from acting in the mid-1960s. She moved to Dallas, Texas, and lived there until her death at age 81 on January 23, 2017.

== Filmography ==
=== Film ===
| Year | Title | Role | Notes |
|---|---|---|---|
| 1957 | The Delicate Delinquent | Patricia | |
| 1957 | The Tin Star | Millie Parker | |
| 1957 | Eighteen and Anxious | Judy Graham Bayne | |
| 1961 | Master of the World | Dorothy Prudent | |
| 1961 | The Clown and the Kid | Robin | |

=== Television ===
| Year | Title | Role | Notes |
|---|---|---|---|
| 1955 | The Public Defender | Mary Nelson | Episode: "Failure" |
| 1955 | Father Knows Best | Jill Carlson | Episode: "Woman in the House" |
| 1955 | Lux Video Theatre | M. Baker | Episode: "Cover-Up" |
| 1956 | The People's Choice | Miss Butterworth | 2 episodes |
| 1956 | The Charles Farrell Show | Laurie | Episode: "Fatal Charm" |
| 1956 | The George Burns and Gracie Allen Show | Linda / Sally Fletcher | 2 episodes |
| 1956 | NBC Matinee Theater | Mary Anita Houkens | 4 episodes |
| 1957 | Panic! | Girl | Episode: "Love Story" |
| 1957 | Bachelor Father | Dr. Barbara Ruskin | Episode: "Uncle Bentley and the Lady Doctor" |
| 1957 | Mickey Spillane's Mike Hammer | Irene Jackson | Episode: "Mere Maid" |
| 1958 | M Squad | Barbara Sullivan | Episode: "The Sitters" |
| 1959 | Buckskin | Minnie | Episode: "The Knight Who Owned Buckskin" |
| 1959 | The Restless Gun | Abigail Garrick | Episode: "Ricochet" |
| 1959 | Tombstone Territory | Angela Worth | Episode: "Warrant for Death" |
| 1959 | Frontier Doctor | Delia Davenport | Episode: "The Elkton Lake Feud" |
| 1959 | Colt .45 | Martha | Episode: "Don't Tell Joe" |
| 1959 | Black Saddle | Mary Wyle | Episode: "Four from Stillwater" |
| 1959 | Men into Space | Ellen Baker | Episode: "Edge of Eternity" |
| 1959 | Grand Jury | Betty Harris | Episode: "Prison Scandal" |
| 1959, 1960 | Death Valley Days | Mrs. Tilghman / Laura Frick | 2 episodes |
| 1959, 1960 | The Texan | Carrie Nagle / Bess Wallen | 2 episodes |
| 1960 | The Millionaire | Ellen | Episode: "Millionaire Sandy Newell" |
| 1960 | The Detectives | Nancy Kirby | Episode: "The Chameleon Truck" |
| 1960 | Tales of Wells Fargo | Lucy Potter | Episode: "The Town" |
| 1960 | Shotgun Slade | Cora Davis | Episode: "The Golden Tunnel" |
| 1960 | Perry Mason | Marjorie Ralston | Episode: "The Case of the Singular Double" |
| 1960 | Lock-Up | Jean Davis | Episode: "Flying High" |
| 1960, 1963 | The Twilight Zone | Ruth / Nan | 2 episodes |
| 1961 | The Tall Man | Marian Swift | Episode: "A Gun Is for Killing" |
| 1961 | Route 66 | Midge Foster | Episode: "An Absence of Tears" |
| 1961 | Assignment: Underwater | Judy | Episode: "Anchor Man" |
| 1961 | The Lawless Years | Goldie Moon | Episode: "Artie Moon" |
| 1961 | The Everglades | Hannah Brown | Episode: "Lie Detector" |
| 1963 | The Dick Powell Show | Jill | Episode: "Everybody Loves Sweeney" |
| 1963 | Dr. Kildare | Nancy Hoyt / Dr. Pauline Stewart | 2 episodes |
