= Ruth Zakarian =

American actress and beauty queen

- Born: Ruth Zakarian; Amsterdam, New York, U.S.
- Other name: Devon Pierce
- Beauty pageant titleholder
- Title: Miss New York Teen USA 1983; Miss Teen USA 1983
- Hair color: Black
- Eye color: Brown
- Major competitions: Miss New York Teen USA 1983 (Winner); Miss Teen USA 1983 (Winner); Miss USA 1984 (Unplaced)

Ruth Zakarian is an American actress and beauty queen who was the winner of the first ever Miss Teen USA 1983 pageant in Lakeland, Florida. She also competed at Miss USA 1984 but did not place.

== Miss Teen USA ==
An Armenian American, Zakarian was born in Amsterdam, New York and represented the state of New York at the Miss Teen USA pageant. Before then, she was a babysitter for Jessica Collins, Miss New York Teen USA 1988 and first runner-up to Miss Teen USA 1988. In her interview during the pageant, Collins called attention to this fact with Zakarian in attendance.

== After Miss Teen USA ==
Zakarian later worked as an actress under the stage name of Devon Pierce. Her most notable role was as "Diane Westin" on the soap opera The Young and the Restless. She also appeared on Santa Barbara as Isabella Castillo.

Awards and achievements
Preceded by ‒	Miss Teen USA; 1983	Succeeded by Cherise Haugen
Preceded by ‒	Miss New York Teen USA; 1983	Succeeded by Denise Scalez
