= Jackie Loughery =

American actress (1930–2024)

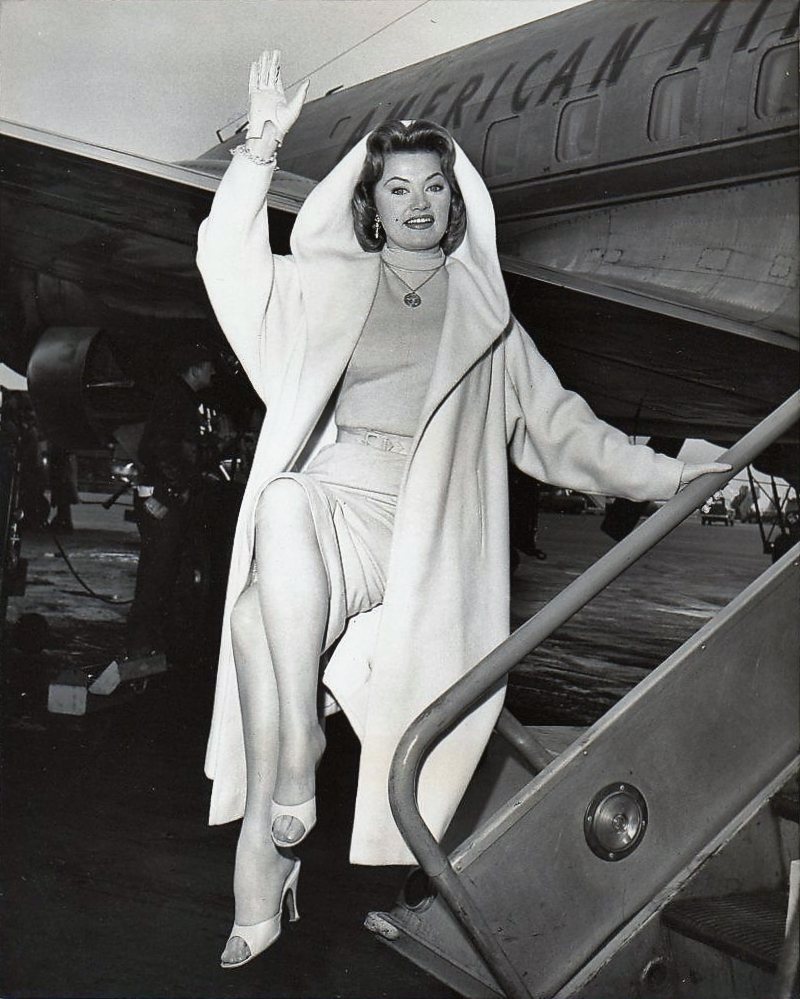
- Loughery in a 1956 American Airlines press photograph
- Born: Jacqueleen Virginia Loughery; April 18, 1930; Brooklyn, New York, U.S.
- Died: February 23, 2024 (aged 93); Los Angeles, California, U.S.
- Other name: Evelyn Avery
- Occupations: Actress; beauty pageant titleholder
- Spouses: Guy Mitchell (m. 1952; div. 1955); Jack Webb (m. 1958; div. 1964); Jack W. Schwietzer (m. 1969; died 2009)
- Beauty pageant titleholder
- Title: Miss New York USA 1952; Miss USA 1952
- Years active: 1951–1969
- Hair color: Red
- Major competitions: Miss New York USA 1952 (Winner); Miss USA 1952 (Winner); Miss Universe 1952 (Top 10)

Jackie Loughery (sometimes credited as Evelyn Avery; April 18, 1930 – February 23, 2024), born Jacqueleen Virginia Loughery, was an American actress and beauty pageant titleholder who was crowned "Miss Rockaway Point" in 1949 before becoming crowned Miss New York USA 1952 and later was the first winner of the Miss USA competition in 1952. Loughery she represented the United States at the Miss Universe 1952, she placed in the Top 10.

== Early life ==
Jacqueleen Virginia Loughery was born on April 18, 1930, and raised in Flatbush, Brooklyn, New York, the daughter and only child of Joseph Clark Loughery and Ellen (Avery) Loughery. She attended St. Francis Xavier Academy for Young Ladies.

== Career ==
=== Miss USA ===
In 1952, Loughery won the Miss USA title after a second ballot broke a first-place tie. Loughery, a redhead, went on to represent the US at the first Miss Universe pageant, where she placed ninth.

=== Entertainment ===
Loughery appeared in several films, including the 1956 comedy Pardners with Martin and Lewis and the 1957 drama The D.I., with Jack Webb, whom she married in 1958.

In 1951, Loughery appeared in the short-lived variety show Seven at Eleven. In 1954, she was Johnny Carson's assistant in the short lived CBS game show Earn Your Vacation, in which contestants were asked geography questions. In 1956, she co-starred with Edgar Buchanan and Jack Buetel in the syndicated western television series Judge Roy Bean, as Judge Bean's niece, Letty. In 1957–58, she made five guest appearances on The George Burns and Gracie Allen Show; three as "Joyce Collins" and the other two as "Vicki Donovan". In 1963, she appeared on Perry Mason as Nell Grimes, the actual murderer of the title character in "The Case of the Bigamous Spouse". She appeared as Martha, sister of Sheriff Sam Phelps in the May 18, 1961, episode of the series Bat Masterson, "Farmer with a Badge". She was featured in the film Eighteen and Anxious (1957) and top-billed in The Hot Angel (1958).

== Personal life and death ==
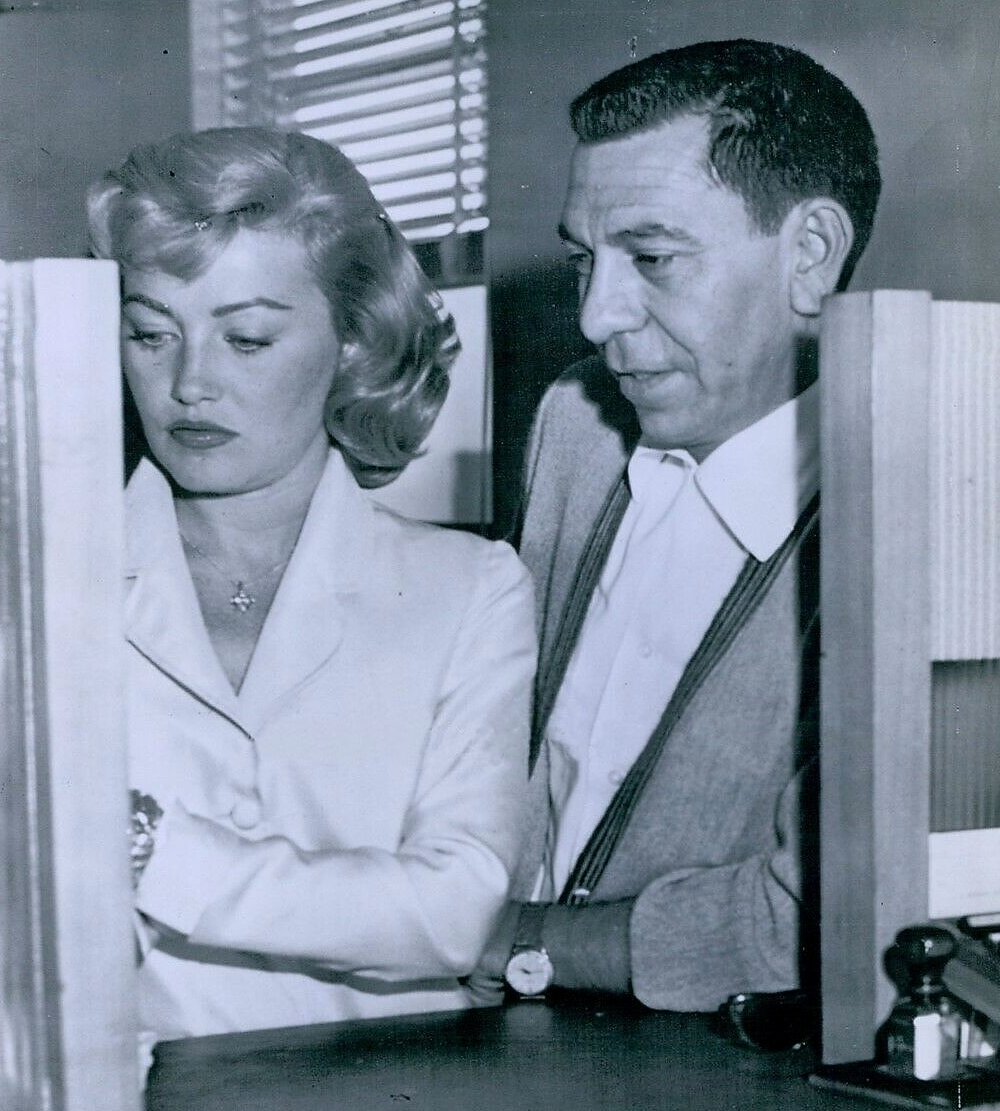
Loughery and Jack Webb applying for marriage license in 1958

In October 1952, Loughery married Guy Mitchell, a singer. After that marriage ended, she wed, in July 1958, actor/producer Jack Webb. (A 1964 newspaper brief reported that Loughery and Webb were wed June 24, 1958, in Studio City.) Loughery divorced Webb in March 1964. She married Jack W. Schwietzer in 1969, and they remained married until his death in 2009. All three marriages were childless.

After retiring from acting, Loughery worked at the Home Savings and Loan Association. In December 2022, she was featured in Western Clippings where she discussed her onscreen career. She was later interviewed in Classic Images.

Loughery died in Los Angeles on February 23, 2024, at the age of 93.

== Filmography ==
Year	Title	Role	Notes
1953	The Mississippi Gambler	Bridesmaid	Uncredited
1953	Abbott and Costello Go to Mars	Venusian Guard No. 1	
1953	Take Me to Town	Dancehall Girl	Uncredited
1953	The Veils of Bagdad	Handmaiden	
1955	Escape to Burma		Uncredited
1955	Son of Sinbad	Harem Girl	Uncredited
1955	The Naked Street	Francie	Uncredited
1956	Pardners	Dolly Riley	
1956	The D.I.	Annie	
1957	Eighteen and Anxious	Ava Norton	
1958	Alfred Hitchcock Presents	Slats	Season 3 Episode 32: "Listen, Listen...!"
1958	The Hot Angel	Mandy Wilson	
1962	A Public Affair	Phyllis Baines	

Awards and achievements
Preceded by None	Miss USA; 1952	Succeeded by (Illinois) Myrna Hansen
Preceded by None	Miss New York USA; 1952	Succeeded by Reta Knapp
