= Michael McGreevey =

American actor and screenwriter (born 1948)

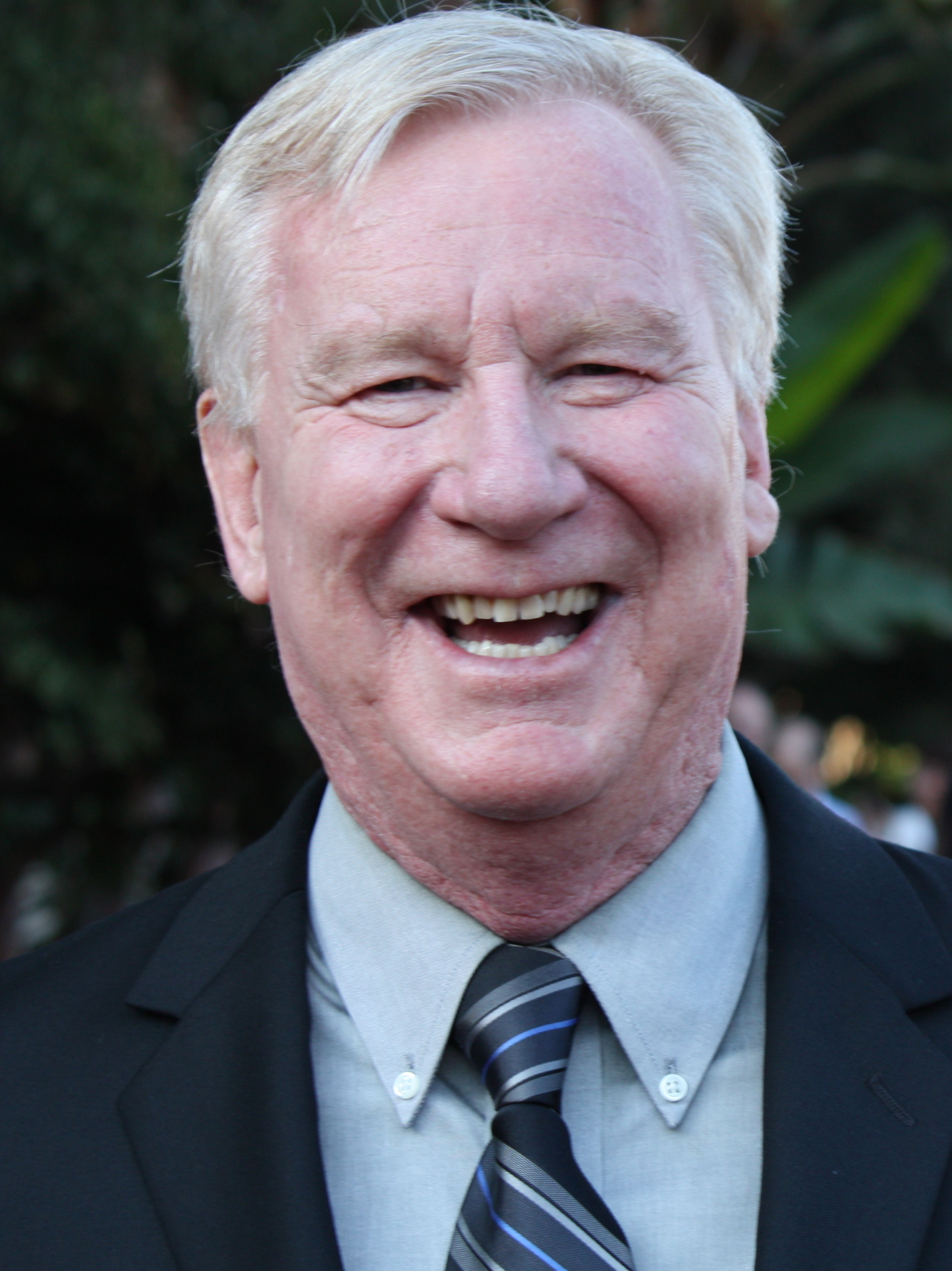
- Michael McGreevey
- Born: February 7, 1948 (age 78); Phoenix, Arizona, U.S.
- Occupations: Actor, screenwriter

Michael McGreevey (born February 7, 1948) is an American actor and screenwriter. As a child and young adult, he appeared in numerous Disney productions, including the Dexter Riley comedies, and in films such as The Way West (1967). He later transitioned into television writing, contributing to series including The Waltons, Quincy, M.E., and Fame, where he also served as script editor and creative consultant. In 1984 he received a Daytime Emmy nomination for co-writing an ABC Afterschool Special, and in 2015 he co-wrote the documentary Earl Hamner Storyteller. He is the son of Emmy Award-winning screenwriter John McGreevey.

== Career ==
McGreevey's first major role was as cabin boy Chip Kessler in the 1959–61 TV series Riverboat. He later remarked that stars Darren McGavin and Burt Reynolds often clashed, saying "they were just two very different personalities," but added that McGavin became a father figure and Reynolds "like a big brother" who even gave him his first football.

During the 1960s and 1970s, McGreevey appeared frequently on Walt Disney's Wonderful World of Color and in the Dexter Riley comedies—The Computer Wore Tennis Shoes (1969), Now You See Him, Now You Don't (1972), and The Strongest Man in the World (1975)—as Dexter's friend Richard Schuyler. He also appeared in Snowball Express (1972) and The Shaggy D.A. (1976), both starring Dean Jones.

Outside of Disney, McGreevey guest-starred on series including The Virginian, Bonanza, and Route 66. His feature film work included The Way West (1967), where he played Brownie Evans, a pioneer who marries Sally Field's character.

After studying film at UCLA, McGreevey co-wrote the 1978 made-for-TV movie Ruby and Oswald with his father. He described it as "a three-way depiction of those four days in Dallas," blending documentary footage of President Kennedy with dramatizations of Ruby and Oswald. The project was sold to CBS with director Mel Stuart attached.

McGreevey later wrote episodes of The Waltons, Quincy, M.E., and Fame, eventually becoming script editor and creative consultant on the latter. In 1984, he earned a Daytime Emmy nomination for co-writing the ABC Afterschool Special "The Celebrity and the Arcade Kid". He later co-wrote the 2015 documentary Earl Hamner Storyteller, focusing on the creator of The Waltons.

== Filmography ==
=== Film appearances ===
Year	Title	Role	Notes
1958	The Girl Most Likely	Red Headed Indian Boy	Uncredited
1959	The Man in the Net	Buck Ritter	
1959	Day of the Outlaw	Bobby – Vic's Son	
1960	Toby Tyler	Concession Worker	Uncredited
1960	Chartroose Caboose	Joey James	
1961	The Clown and the Kid	Shawn	
1967	The Way West	Brownie Evans	
1968	The Impossible Years	Andy McClaine	
1969	Death of a Gunfighter	Dan Joslin	
1969	The Computer Wore Tennis Shoes	R. Schuyler	
1972	Now You See Him, Now You Don't	Richard Schuyler	
1972	Snowball Express	Wally Perkins	
1975	The Strongest Man in the World	Richard Schuyler	
1976	The Shaggy D.A.	Sheldon	
2014	A Lesson of Love	Reverend	(final film role)

=== Television appearances ===
Year	Title	Role	Notes
1959	Black Saddle	Tad Murdock	Episode: "Murdock"
1959-1961	Lassie	Mike/Joey	2 episodes
1959-1960	Riverboat	Chip Kessler	17 episodes
1960	The Donna Reed Show	Gordie	Episode: "Someone Is Watching"
1961	Dr. Kildare	Tommy Adams	Episode: "Hit and Run"
1961	Walt Disney's Wonderful World of Color	Freddy	Episode: "Texas John Slaughter: Frank Clell's in Town"
1961	Wagon Train	Sonny Sherman / Boy	2 episodes
1961	Bonanza	Jeremy Paster	Episode: "Gabrielle"
1962	Route 66	Davey Selman	Episode: "Shoulder the Sky, My Lad"
1962	Walt Disney's Wonderful World of Color	Arthur Loomis	Episode: Sammy, the Way-Out Seal: Part 1 Episode: Sammy, the Way-Out Seal: Part 2
1964	Walt Disney's Wonderful World of Color	J.D. Gray	Episode: "For Love of Willadean: A Taste of Melon"; Episode: "For Love of Willadean: Treasure in the Haunted House"
1968	The Invaders	Eddie McKay	Episode: "The Pursued"
1969	The Mod Squad	Edward Timmers	Episode: "A Place to Run, a Heart to Hide In"
1970	The Virginian	Toby Wheeler	Episode: "Experiment at New Life"
1970	Walt Disney's Wonderful World of Color	Ralph	Episode: "The Wacky Zoo of Morgan City: Part 1"; Episode: "The Wacky Zoo of Morgan City: Part 2"
1971	If Tomorrow Comes	Harlan Phillips	ABC Movie of the Week
1971-1972	Room 222	Rudy	2 episodes
1972	Walt Disney's Wonderful World of Color	Norman	Episode: "Michael O'Hara the Fourth: Part 1"; Episode: "Michael O'Hara the Fourth: Part 2"
1973	Harry O	Bobby	Epísode: "Such Dust as Dreams Are Made On"
1973	The Waltons	Hobart 'Hobie' Shank	Episode: "The Braggart"
1977	Charlie's Angels	Ted Blain	Episode: "Terror on Ward One"
1977	Family	Sam Wilkes	Episodes: Part 1 & 2 Jury Duty
