= John Nolan (American actor) =

American film, stage and television actor

- Born: John F. Nolan; April 30, 1933; Brooklyn, New York, U.S.
- Died: April 7, 2000 (aged 66); Hollywood, California, U.S.
- Occupation(s): Film, stage and television actor

John F. Nolan (April 30, 1933 – April 7, 2000) was an American film, stage and television actor. He was known for playing the recurring role as John the bartender in the medical drama television series Quincy, M.E.. He also lent his talents to at least 23 other television shows and films including Adam-12, Marcus Welby, M.D. and the 1970 film Airport.

== Filmography ==
- The Hot Angel (1958) - Ray
- -30- (1959) - Ron Danton
- The Last Time I Saw Archie (1961) - Lt. Oglemeyer
- The Big Mouth (1967) - F.B.I. Agent
- Hook, Line & Sinker (1969) - Carte Blanche Man (uncredited)
- Airport (1970) - Richard Ross - Passenger (uncredited)
- Which Way to the Front? (1970) - German Officer (uncredited)
