= The Hot Angel =

1958 film

- Theatrical release poster
- Directed by: Joe Parker
- Screenplay by: Stanley Kallis
- Produced by: Stanley Kallis
- Starring: Jackie Loughery; Ed Kemmer; Mason Alan Dinehart; Emory Parnell; Lyle Talbot; Boyd Santell
- Cinematography: Karl Struss
- Edited by: Leon Selditz; Eda Warren
- Music by: Richard Markowitz
- Production company: Paramount Pictures
- Distributed by: Paramount Pictures
- Release date: December 1958
- Running time: 73 minutes
- Country: United States
- Language: English

The Hot Angel is a 1958 American drama film directed by Joe Parker and written by Stanley Kallis. The film stars Jackie Loughery, Ed Kemmer, Mason Alan Dinehart, Emory Parnell, Lyle Talbot and Boyd Santell. It was released in December 1958 by Paramount Pictures.

== Plot ==
Mandy Wilson runs a small airstrip near the Grand Canyon. She and brother Joe are glad to see pilot Chuck Lawson, who hasn't been here in five years. Their brother Tom heroically saved Chuck's life during the Korean War.

Joe has fallen in with a motorcycle gang, so Chuck is asked by Mandy to help straighten him out. Chuck is hired by uranium miner Van Richards to maintain surveillance from the air and find out who's been stealing valuable mineral deposits. He meets the bikers in Joe's gang, particularly the leaders, Judd and Mick Pfeiffer, and demonstrates his own skill on a bike while also giving flying lessons to Joe.

When the thieves realize Chuck's on to them, his plane is rigged to crash. Chuck manages to land it in the Grand Canyon, but is in such a precarious place that he warns Joe not to attempt a rescue. Joe gets to him safely anyway, saving the day, and it's clear that Chuck and Mandy are now in love.

== Cast ==
- Jackie Loughery as Mandy Wilson
- Ed Kemmer as Chuck Lawson
- Mason Alan Dinehart as Joe Wilson
- Emory Parnell as Judd Pfeifer
- Lyle Talbot as Van Richards
- Boyd Santell as Mick Pfeiffer
- Heather Ames as Lynn Conners
- Steffi Sidney as Myrna
- John Nolan as Ray
- Richard Stauffer as Monk
- Kathi Thornton as Liz
- Harold Mallet as Pilot
