= Veronica Kay =

American surfer

Veronica Kay (born December 8, 1980) was a professional surfer and is a model from La Jolla, California. Kay started surfing at the age of 13 and eventually became the 1997 champion of the National Scholastic Surfing Association. She was a participant in the reality tv show Boarding House: North Shore and has been endorsed by many companies such as Roxy and Gravity Skateboards. In 2002, she was ranked #75 in Stuff Magazine's list of 102 Sexiest Women in the World. She has also been featured in numerous other magazines such as Seventeen, Teen People, Surfer, Surfing Girl, Men’s Journal, Sports Fitness and Maxim. Despite having been one of the most well known female surfers, she failed to win any major titles on the pro circuit and is currently no longer competing.
