= Miss New York Teen USA =

Beauty pageant competition

- Formation: 1983
- Type: Beauty pageant
- Headquarters: Clermont
- Location: Florida
- Members: Miss Teen USA
- Key people: Deborah Miller; Cindy Provost
- Website: missnewyorkusa.com

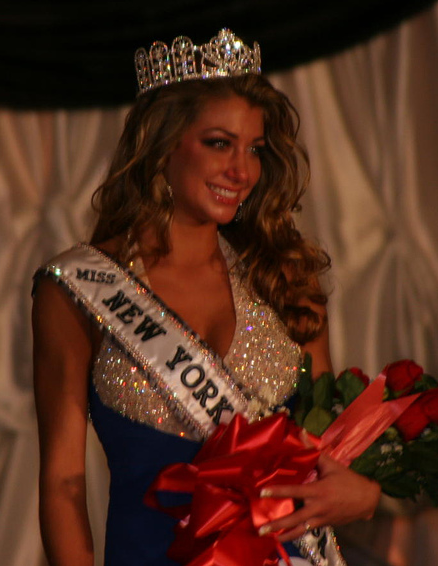
Tatiana Pallagi after winning the Miss New York Teen USA 2007 title

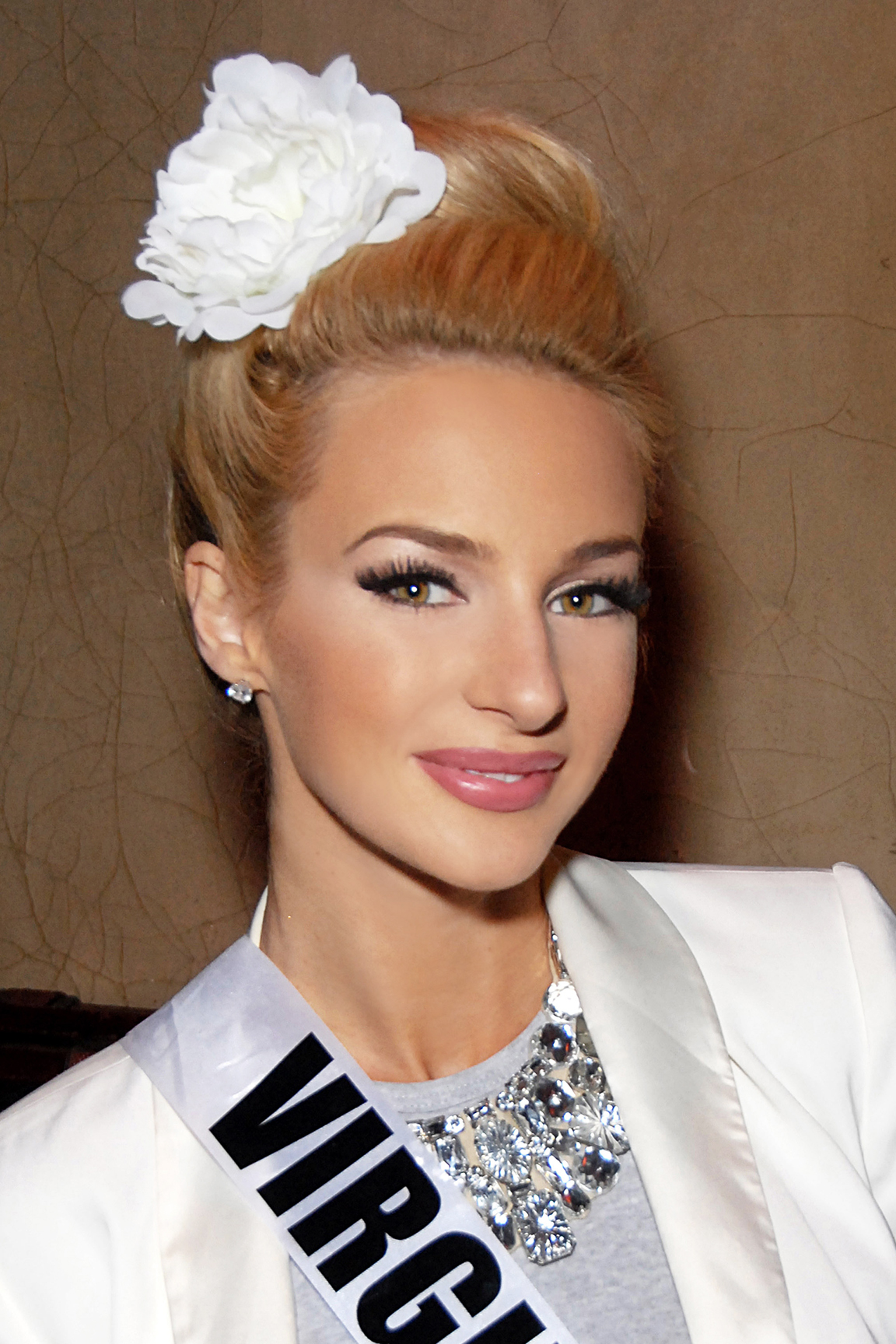
Catherine Muldoon, Miss New York Teen USA 2004

The Miss New York Teen USA competition is the pageant that selects the representative for the state of New York in the Miss Teen USA pageant. It is directed by D&D Productions. New York is the first state to win the Miss Teen USA title, when Ruth Zakarian won the inaugural pageant, Miss Teen USA 1983.

New York is also one of only five states to have won the Miss Congeniality award at least two times.

Elisa Akin of New York City was crowned Miss New York Teen USA 2026 on July 26, 2026, at the Hilton Parsippany Hotel in Parsippany. She will represent New York at Miss Teen USA 2026.

== Results summary ==
=== Placements ===
- Miss Teen USA: Ruth Zakarian (1983)
- 1st runners-up: Jessica Collins (1988), Gloria Almonte (2001), Stephanie Skinner (2023)
- 2nd runner-up: Claudia Liem (1986), Elisa Akin (2026)
- 4th runner-up: Ginger Ragaishis (2025)
- Top 6: Sarah Gore (1993)
- Top 10: Michelle Kelenski (1987), Beth Savage (1989), Aiesha Hendrick (1996), Marley Delduchetto (2002), Catherine Muldoon (2004)
- Top 15: Natascha Bessez (2005), Thatiana Diaz (2010), Geena Cardalena (2015), Isabella Griffith (2017)
- Top 16: Sabrina Mastrangelo (2012), Nikki Orlando (2013)
- Top 20: Valarie Goorahoo (2024)

New York holds a record of 20 placements at Miss Teen USA.

=== Awards ===
- Miss Congeniality: Amber Evans (1992), Morgan Maholick (1999)
- Miss Photogenic: Sana Idnani (2008)
- Best Overall Interview: Stephanie Skinner (2023)
- People's Choice: Valarie Goorahoo (2024)

== Winners ==
- Declared as Winner
- Ended as runner-up
- Ended as one of the finalists or semifinalists

Year	Name	Hometown	Age^{1}	Local title	Placement at MTUSA	Special awards at MTUSA	Notes
2026	Elisa Akin	New York City	18	Miss Manhattan Teen	2nd runner-up		
2025	Ginger Ragaishis	New York City	19	Miss Gotham City Teen	4th runner-up		Previously Miss Vermont's Teen 2023; Top 11 at Miss America's Teen 2024
2024	Valarie Goorahoo	Valley Stream	17	Miss Valley Stream Teen	Top 20	People's Choice	
2023	Stephanie Skinner	Syracuse	19	Miss North New York Teen	1st runner-up	Best Overall Interview	Later Miss Pennsylvania 2026; Formerly Miss High School America 2021
2022	Mahdiya Chowdhury	East Harlem	17				
2021	Geanna Koulouris	Bethpage	19	Miss Bethpage Teen			
2020	Maya Dominguez	Yonkers	19	Miss Yonkers Teen			
2019	Hailey Germano	Smithtown	18				
2018	Saige Guerin	Staten Island	17				
2017	Isabella Griffith	Melville	16		Top 15		
2016	Natalia Terrero	Commack	17				
2015	Geena Cardalena	Floral Park	18		Top 15		
2014	Corrin Stellakis	Bridgeport	16				Later Miss Missouri World 2015; Top 12 at Miss World America 2015.; Later became Miss Earth United States 2016; Miss Earth-Fire 2016.; Later Miss U.S. International 2022
2013	Nikki Orlando	Smithtown	16	Miss Long Island Teen	Top 16		
2012	Sabrina Mastrangelo	Bellmore	16	Miss Long Island Teen	Top 16		
2011	Lisa Drouillard	Brooklyn	19				Later Miss Grand Haiti 2014; Top 10 at Miss Grand International 2014.; Later Miss Haiti Universe 2015
2010	Thatiana Diaz	Bayside	17		Top 15		Later Miss Comunidad Dominicana en Estados Unidos 2013 and Top 10 at Miss Dominican Republic 2014.; Later Miss New York USA 2015; Top 15 at Miss USA 2015.
2009	Taylor Gildersleeve	Mattituck	17				Formerly on ABC daytime soap opera All My Children as "Sydney Harris" (2006–2007)
2008	Sana Idnani	Roslyn	18			Miss Photogenic	
2007	Tatiana Pallagi	Avon	17				
2006	Candace Kuykendall	Rochester	17				Later Miss New York USA 2014
2005	Natascha Bessez	New York City	18		Semi-finalist		
2004	Catherine Muldoon	Chappaqua	18		Top 10		Later Miss Virginia USA 2012
2003	Adriana Diaz	Bronx	18				Later Miss New York USA 2006
2002	Marley Delduchetto	Syracuse	18		Semi-finalist		
2001	Gloria Almonte	Bronx	18		1st runner-up		Later Miss New York USA 2007
2000	Tina Casciani	Wantagh	18				Successor to crown
2000	Emily Pollak	Rochester	18		did not compete		Resigned prior to competing at Miss Teen USA.
1999	Morgan Maholick	New York City	17			Miss Congeniality	
1998	Lindsay Fredette	Glens Falls	15				Sister of Sacramento Kings basketball player Jimmer Fredette and rapper TJ Fredette.
1997	Jessica-Lynn Ferdinand	New York City	17				
1996	Aiesha Hendrick	New York City	17		Semi-finalist		
1995	Tara Campbell	Clarence Center	19				
1994	Kimberly Pressler	Franklinville	16				Later Miss New York USA 1999; Miss USA 1999
1993	Sara Rae Gore	Queensbury	17		Top 6		
1992	Amber Evans	Rochester	17			Miss Congeniality	
1991	Wendy Cooper	Rochester	19				
1990	Catherine Bliss	New York City	15				Later Miss Vermont USA 1998
1989	Beth Savage	New York City	16		Semi-finalist		
1988	Jessica Collins	Amsterdam	17		1st runner-up		Actress
1987	Michelle Kelenski	Ballston Spa	18		Semi-finalist		
1986	Claudia Liem	Glendale	15		2nd runner-up		
1985	Shelley Lown	Red Hook	18				
1984	Denise Scalez	New York City	19				
1983	Ruth Zakarian	Amsterdam	17		Miss Teen USA 1983		Competed at Miss USA 1984 as Miss Teen USA

^{1} Age at the time of the Miss Teen USA pageant
