= Marissa Whitley =

American model

- Born: Marissa Janine Whitley; January 11, 1983 (age 43); Los Angeles, California, U.S.
- Height: 5 ft 8 in (1.73 m)
- Beauty pageant titleholder
- Title: Miss Missouri Teen USA 2001; Miss Teen USA 2001
- Hair color: Brown
- Eye color: Brown
- Major competition: Miss Teen USA 2001 (winner)

Marissa Janine Whitley (born January 11, 1983) is an American model and beauty queen who won Miss Teen USA 2001 title representing the state of Missouri. She was born in Los Angeles, California, to an African-American father and European-American mother. The youngest of four, Whitley moved to Springfield, Missouri, at age three after the premature death of her mother and was raised by her aunt while her older siblings were split among other family members. At age 5, Whitley's father was killed in a drive by shooting in Los Angeles before they had the chance to meet. She was the first titleholder from that state to win the national competition.

After winning Miss Merrie Christmas for scholarship money in her junior year, she was given an entry form by her older sister and decided to compete in the Miss Missouri Teen USA Pageant. Whitley won her first title, Miss Missouri Teen USA in 2000, and reigned until she won the Miss Teen USA 2001 title. She won the state title along with the award for Miss Congeniality and set her sights on the national title following graduation. Aged 18, she became the first winner from Missouri to win the national title during the 19th Annual Miss Teen USA 2001 Competition, airing live on CBS.

Whitley remained in New York City where she worked for MTV Networks on the College Television Network and as a commercial print model for Ford Models. She continued to speak at events around the country.
