= Miss New York USA =

Beauty pageant competition

- Formation: 1952
- Type: Beauty pageant
- Headquarters: Clermont
- Location: Florida
- Members: Miss USA
- Official language: English
- Key people: Deborah Miller; Cindy Provost
- Website: Official website

The Miss New York USA competition is the pageant that selects the representative for the State of New York in the Miss USA pageant. It is directed by D&D Productions.

The current titleholder is Jenna Dykstra of New York City who was crowned on July 26, 2026, at the Hilton Parsippany Hotel in Parsippany. She will represent New York at Miss USA 2026.

== Background ==
New York is one of the most successful states at Miss USA, and is ranked third in terms of number and value of placement across all the years of competition. New York's strongest run was an unbroken string of placements from 1957 to 1966. The state also had a streak of three consecutive first runner-up placements from 1972 to 1974. In 1954, Karin Hultman was second runner-up to Miriam Stevenson of South Carolina. She later moved up to be first runner-up, as Ellen Whitehead from Virginia was dethroned due to underage (she was sixteen). Stevenson would eventually become Miss Universe 1954, but there was no rule in 1954 that if the Miss USA titleholder won Miss Universe, the first runner-up would become Miss USA. Hultman went on to represent United States at Miss World 1954, in which she also came first runner-up.

New York has the third (equal) highest number of Miss USA victories. They also have the third highest number of semi-finalist (or better) placings (thirty-three).

Seven Miss New York USAs have competed at Miss Teen USA, including one who went on to win the Miss USA crown: Kimberly Pressler and the other inherited the Miss USA title: Shanna Moakler. Of these, only five held the title Miss New York Teen USA; one represented Rhode Island (Moakler) and one New Hampshire (Maureen Murray). Only one Miss New York USA has competed at Miss America.

== Gallery of titleholders ==
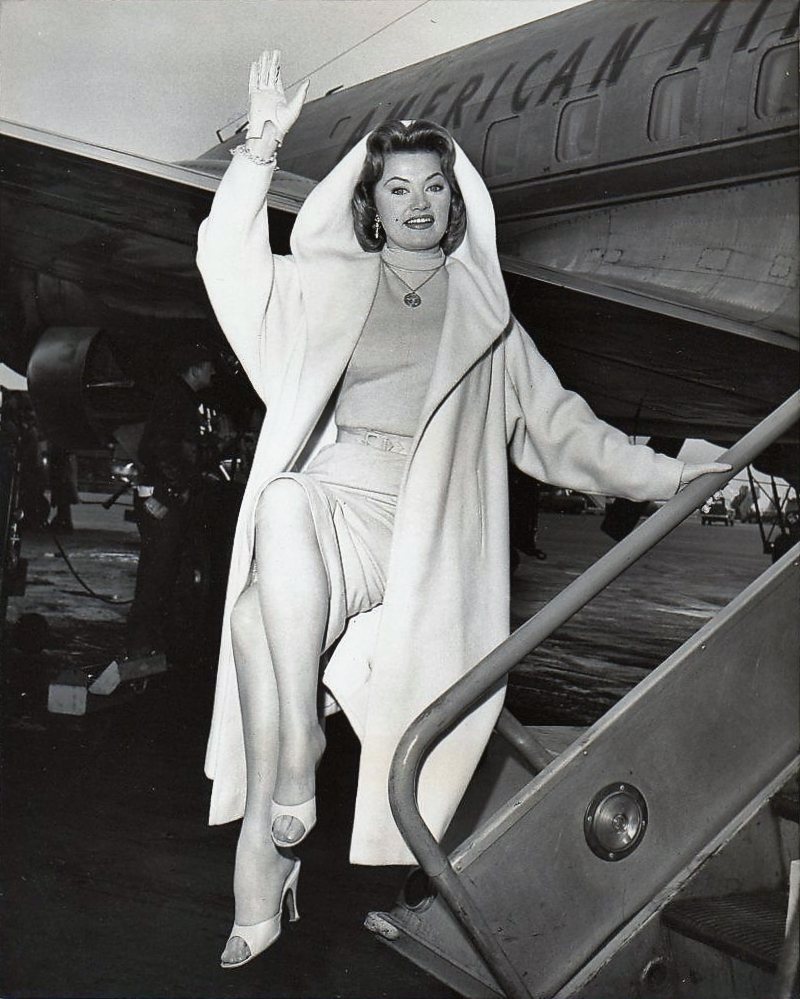
Jackie Loughery, Miss New York USA 1952, and Miss USA 1952

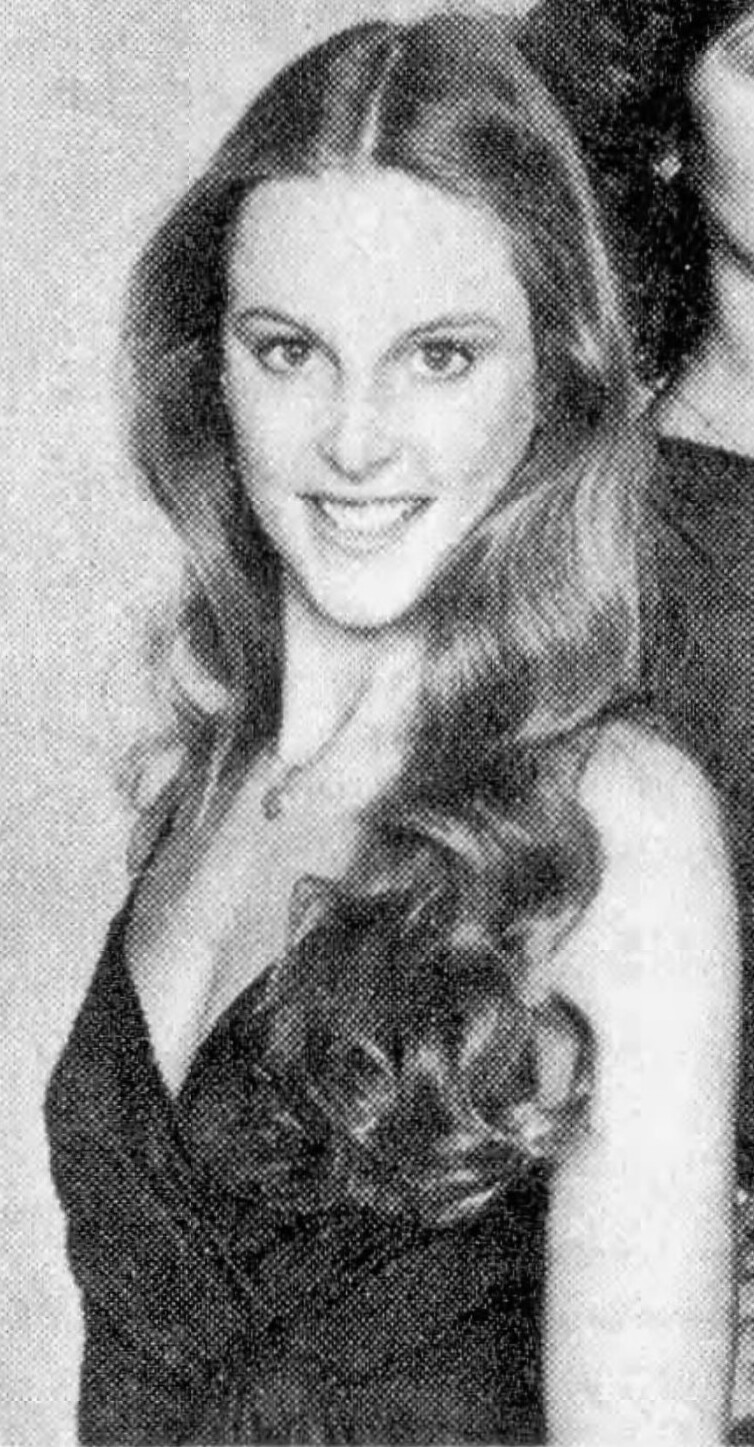
Mary Therese Friel, Miss New York USA 1979, and Miss USA 1979

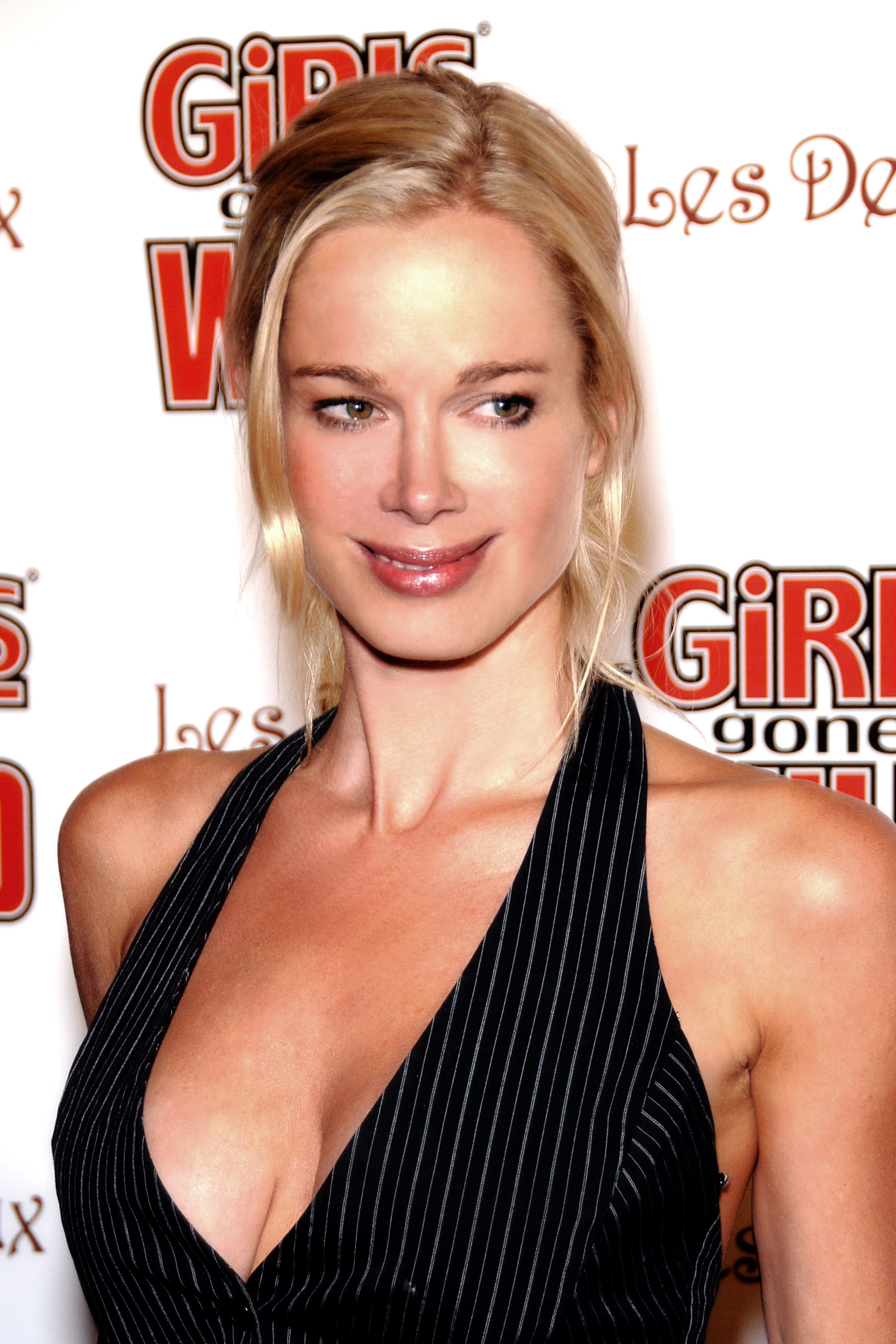
Jennifer Gareis, Miss New York USA 1994

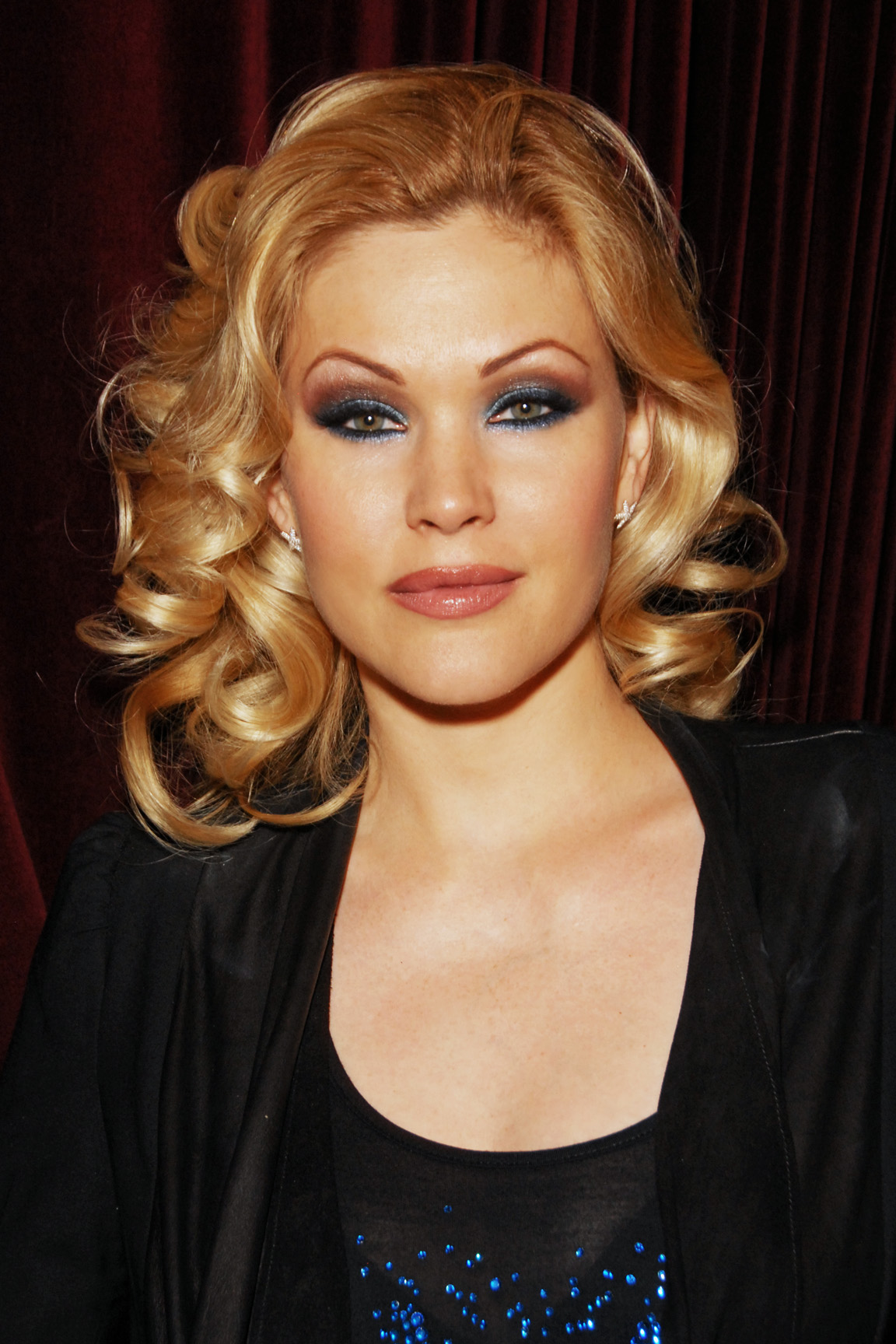
Shanna Moakler, Miss New York USA 1995. She later assumed the Miss USA 1995 title after Chelsi Smith won Miss Universe 1995

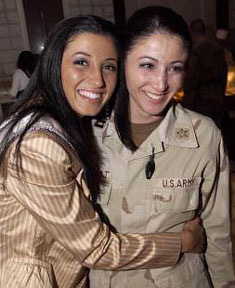
Miss New York USA 2004 Jaclyn Nesheiwat (left) visited U.S. troops in Iraq in March 2004. While in Baghdad, she met her sister, Army Capt. Julie Nesheiwat (right)

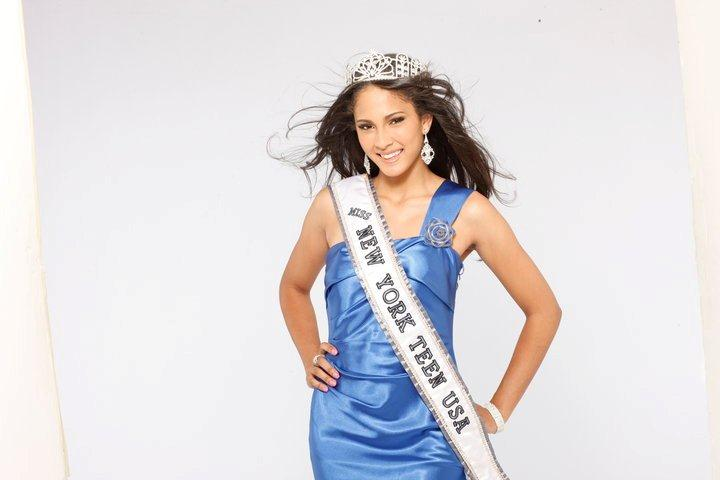
Thatiana Diaz, Miss New York USA 2015

== Results summary ==
=== Placements in Miss USA ===
- Miss USAs: Jackie Loughery (1952), Mary Therese Friel (1979), Kimberly Pressler (1999)
- 1st runner-up: Karin Hultman (1954), Mary Rodites (1960), Alberta Phillips (1972), Susan Carlson (1973), Barbara Cooper (1974), Shanna Moakler (1995) (Note: Shanna Moakler was 1st runner-up at Miss USA, but succeeded the Miss USA title when Chelsi Smith became Miss Universe.)
- 2nd runner-up: Renee Roy (1954)
- 3rd runner-up: Alexa Currey (1961)
- 4th runner-up: Arlene Nesbitt (1959)
- Top 6: Jennifer Gareis (1994)
- Top 10/11/12: Janet Kadlecik (1955), Patricia O'Kane (1955), Virginia Fox (1958), Jeanne "Jeannie" Quinn (1963), Debra "Debbie" Maurice (1980), Jennifer Mikelinich (1983), Maureen Murray (1991), Wendy Mock (1993), Carrie Tucker (2000), Karla Cavalli (2002), Meaghan Jarensky (2005), Hannah Lopa (2017), Andreia Gibau (2020), Jenna Dykstra (2026)
- Top 15/16/20: Reta Knapp (1953), Sanita Pelkey (1957), Sherralyn Patecell (1962), Dorothy Langhans (1964), Gloria Jon (1965), Nancy Self (1966), June West (1968), Rosemary Hradek (1969), Christina Tefft (1970), Amber Collins (2011), Thatiana Diaz (2015), Marizza Delgado (2024)

New York holds a record of 39 placements at Miss USA.

==== Awards ====
- Miss Photogenic: Barbara Cooper (1974)
- Best State Costume: Nancy Self (1966)

== Winners ==
Color key

- Declared as Winner
- Ended as runner-up or finalist
- Ended as one of the semifinalists

Year	Name	Hometown	Age (Note: Age at the time of the Miss USA pageant)	Local title	Placement at Miss USA	Special awards at Miss USA	Notes
2026	Jenna Dykstra	New York City	30	Miss Big Apple	Top 10		Previously Miss Supranational USA 2024; 1st Runner-up at Miss Supranational 2024
2025	Christiana DiNardo	Rochester	27	Miss Rochester			
2024	Marizza Delgado	New York City	24	Miss Brooklyn Bridge	Top 20		Previously Miss Earth New York 2022 (Top 20 at Miss Earth USA 2022)
2023	Rachelle Di Stasio	New York City	26	Miss Empire State			
2022	Heather Nunez	New York City	26	Miss Sugar Hill			
2021	Briana Siaca	Brentwood	27	Miss Brentwood			
2020	Andreia Gibau	Manhattan	24	Miss Soho	Top 10		Born in Cape Verde; Previously Miss Teen Earth United States 2016; Previously Miss Earth United States 2017; Top 16 at Miss Earth 2017; Longest-reigning Miss New York USA at 1 year, 7 months and 1 day
2019	Florinda Kajtazi	Yonkers	27				
2018	Génesis Camila Suero Suero Matos	Brooklyn	25				Born in the Dominican Republic; Later competed at Miss Dominican Republic 2019 representing Barahona, finished in top 15
2017	Hannah Lopa	Spencerport	24		Top 10		Currently a MotoAmerica sports reporter at beIN Sports
2016	Serena Bucaj	Suffern	22				
2015	Thatiana Diaz	Queens	22		Top 15		Competed at Miss Dominican Republic 2014, placing in the top 10; Previously Miss New York Teen USA 2010; Top 15 at Miss Teen USA 2010
2014	Candace Marie Kuykendall	Rochester	24				Competed in the pageant as Candace Kendall; Previously Miss New York Teen USA 2006
2013	Joanne Nosuchinsky	Hell's Kitchen	24	Miss Hell's Kitchen			Currently works as an actor based in New York; permanent panelist on Fox News Channel's Red Eye and panelist on The Greg Gutfeld Show.
2012	Johanna Sambucini	Brooklyn	24	Miss City of Dreams			Born in Dominican Republic; Previously Miss Comunidad Dominicana En EEUU World 2011
2011	Amber Marie Collins	Manhattan	26		Top 16		
2010	Davina Marie Reeves	New York City	26				
2009	Tracey Chang	New York City	25				Born in China
2008	Danielle Roundtree	New York City	18				Also a contestant on season 8 of American Idol, cut in the Hollywood rounds
2007	Gloria Sophia Almonte	Bronx	23				Previously Miss New York Teen USA 2001; 1st runner-up at Miss Teen USA 2001; Semifinalist at Miss Puerto Rico Universe 2009
2006	Adriana Sabrina Diaz	Bronx	21				Previously Miss New York Teen USA 2003; Currently works in CBS News
2005	Meaghan Jarensky	Bronx	26		Top 10 (8th)		Later Mrs. New York America 2010 under her married name, Meaghan Castaldi.; Was contestant on Fear Factor in 2005 on the Miss USA episode #5.29 (3rd place)
2004	Jaclyn Nesheiwat	New York City	23				Later Mrs. Florida America 2008 and first runner-up to Mrs. America 2008 under her married name, Jaclyn Stapp
2003	Nadia Behette	Bay Ridge	25				
2002	Karla Cavalli	Mineola	25		Top 12 (12th)		
2001	Lisa E. Pavlakis	Islip	22				
2000	Carrie Tucker	Nesconset	25		Top 10 (8th)		
1999	Melissa Huggins				did not compete		Successor to crown
1999	Kimberly Ann Pressler	Franklinville	21		Miss USA 1999		Previously Miss New York Teen USA 1994; Non-finalist at Miss Universe 1999
1998	Susan Wisdom	Smithtown	24				
1997	Ramona Rueter	Rochester	26				
1996	Keelin Curnuck	Levittown	23				
1995	Shanna Lynn Moakler	New York City	19		1st runner-up		Became Miss USA 1995 after Chelsi Smith won Miss Universe 1995: Previously Miss Rhode Island Teen USA 1992; Semi-finalist at Miss Teen USA 1992; Miss Teen All American 1993 as Miss Rhode Island; Playboy Playmate and actress; Current director of Nevada and Utah pageants
1994	Jennifer Lynne Gareis	New York City	23		Top 6 Finalist (6th)		Second runner-up at Miss Pennsylvania USA 1992; Later a soap opera actress, best known for her roles on The Young and the Restless (Grace Turner) and The Bold and the Beautiful (Donna Logan)
1993	Wendy Marie Mock	Levittown	21		Semi-finalist (12th)		
1992	Christine Elizabeth Beachak	Peekskill					Represented New York in Miss Oktoberfest 1993, did not place
1991	Maureen Ann Murray	New York City	25		Semi-finalist (7th)		Previously Miss New Hampshire Teen USA 1983
1990	Patricia Murphy	Pearl River					
1989	Jennifer Fisher	Rochester					
1988	Linnea Mancini	Carmel	24				Went on to become the pageant director for The CW reality show Crowned: The Mother of All Pageants
1987	Constance McCullough	New York City					
1986	Beth Laufer	West Islip					
1985	Lovey King	Yonkers					
1984	Caroline Flury	West Seneca					Miss Oktoberfest 1983 as Miss Buffalo
1983	Jennifer Anne Mikelinich	Huntington		Miss Huntington Station	Semi-finalist (12th)		
1982	Annemarie Henderson	Monroe					
1981	Deborah Ann Fountain	Bronx	25				Previously Miss North Carolina World 1979; Top 8 finalist in Miss World America 1979; Was not allowed to compete at Miss USA after she was caught padding her swimsuit during the preliminary competition
1980	Debra "Debbie" Sue Maurice	New York City	21	Miss Gotham	Top 12		Previously Miss Massachusetts World 1978; 1st runner-up in Miss World America 1978
1979	Mary Therese Friel	Rochester			Miss USA 1979		Semifinalist at Miss Universe 1979
1978	Darlene Javits	Plainview				Best State Costume – 2nd Place	
1977	Debbie Martin	New York City					
1976	Carol Doerr	New York City					
1975	Sonja Beverly Anderson	New York City					Later Miss New York 1976
1974	Barbara Gail Cooper	Brooklyn			1st runner-up	Miss Photogenic	
1973	Susan Elizabeth Carlson	Schenectady	18		1st runner-up		Later Miss Tennessee World and represented Tennessee in Miss World USA 1975; Later Miss International USA 1976; 3rd runner up at Miss International 1976
1972	Alberta Phillips	Westbury			1st runner-up		
1971	Barbara Lopez	Yorktown Heights					
1970	Christina Tefft	New York City			Semi-finalist (11th)		
1969	Rosemary Hradek	West Hempstead			Semi-finalist (10th)		
1968	June West	New York City			Semi-finalist (9th)		
1967	Wendy Cox	Bronxville					
1966	Nancy Self	New York City			Semi-Finalist (8th)	Best State Costume.	
1965	Gloria Jon	New York City			Semi-finalist (8th)		
1964	Dorothy Langhans	Wantagh			Semi-finalist (9th)		Later Miss New York World; 4th runner up at Miss USA World 1965
1963	Jeanne Marie "Jeannie" Quinn	East Meadow	19		Top 15		Later Miss USA World 1964; Semifinalist at Miss World 1964; 1st runner up at Miss American Beauty 1964; Title for USA representative at Miss International pageant
1962	Sherralyn Patecell	Flushing			Semi-finalist		
1961	Alexandra Stuard "Alexa" Currey	New York City			3rd runner-up		
1960	Mary Rodites	Port Jefferson	19		1st runner-up		
1959	Arlene Nesbitt	New York City			4th runner-up		2nd runner-up in the 1960 Miss Sun Fun USA Pageant
1958	Virginia Fox	New York City			Semi-finalist (9th)		
1957	Sanita Pelkey	New York City			Semi-finalist (12th)		
1956	Kay Douglas	New York City					
1955	Janet Kadlecik	New York City			Semi-finalist (8th)		
1955	Patricia Ann O'Kane	New York City			Top 15		She represented New York City and finished in the Top 15.
1954	Karin Hultman	New York City			1st runner-up		Later 1st runner-up after original 1st runner-up was dethroned; 1st runner up at Miss World 1954
1954	Renee Roy	New York City			2nd runner-up		She represented New York City and finished as 3rd runner-up, but later 2nd runner-up after the original 2nd moved one place up taking the place of the 1st runner-up
1953	Reta Knapp	New York City			Semi-finalist (16th)		
1952	Jacqueleen "Jackie" Virginia Loughery	Brooklyn			Miss USA 1952		Semifinalist at Miss Universe 1952

== Notes ==
Pageant Hosts 2020: Augusto Valverde (television host from Global Child) & Hanna Lopa
