= Kaliegh Garris =

American model and beauty pageant contestant

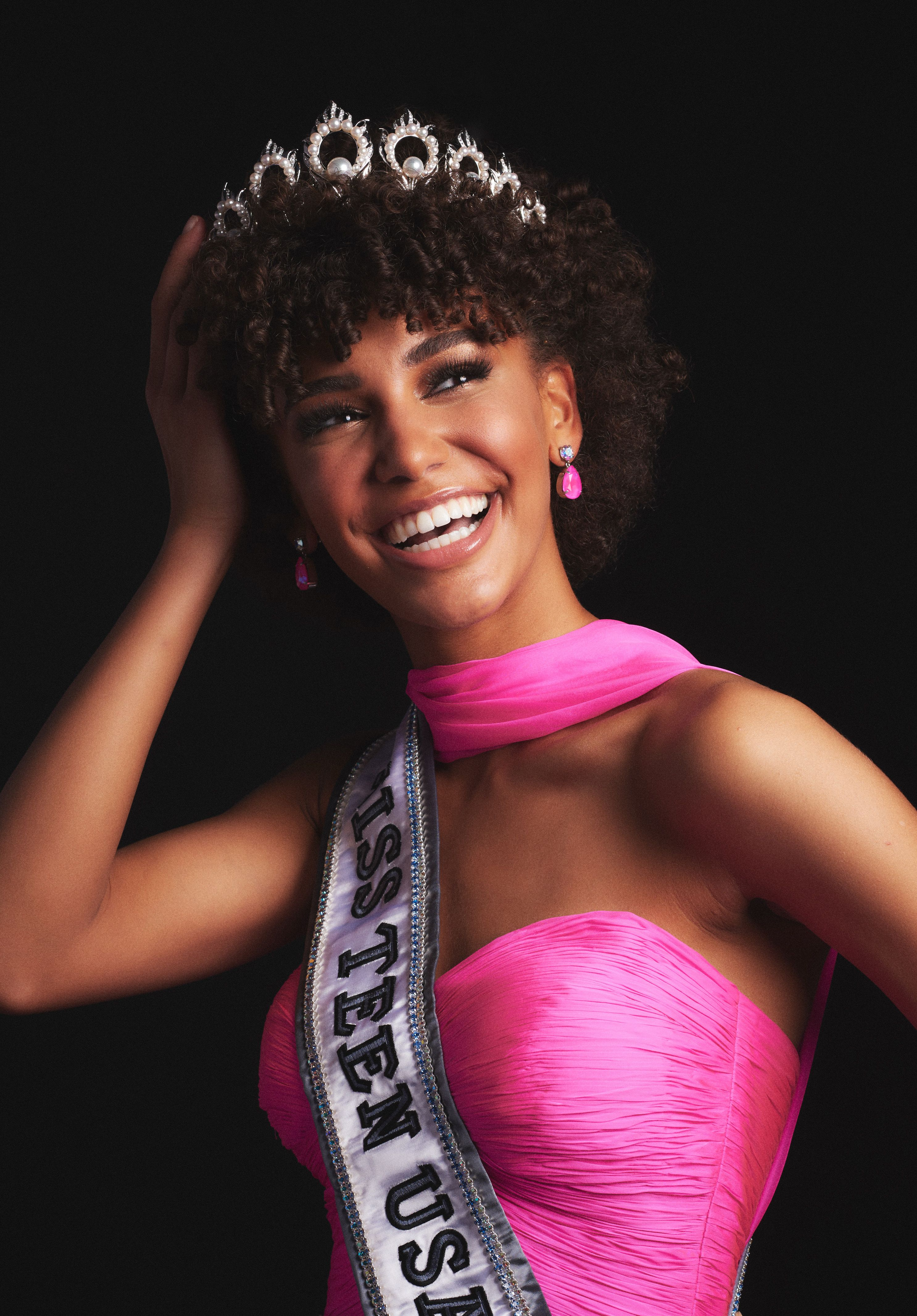
- Kaliegh Garris in 2019
- Born: August 21, 2000 (age 26); New Haven, Connecticut, U.S.
- Education: Southern Connecticut State University
- Height: 5 ft 10 in (1.78 m)
- Beauty pageant titleholder
- Title: Miss Connecticut Teen USA 2019; Miss Teen USA 2019
- Hair color: Brown
- Eye color: Brown
- Major competitions: Miss Connecticut Teen USA 2019; (Winner); Miss Teen USA 2019; (Winner)

Kaliegh Garris (born August 21, 2000) is an American TV host, model and beauty queen who was crowned Miss Teen USA 2019. Garris had previously been crowned Miss Connecticut Teen USA 2019; she is the second entrant from Connecticut to have been crowned Miss Teen USA, following Logan West who was crowned Miss Teen USA 2012.

With her win, 2019 became the first year that all five major pageants were won by mixed and black women; other titleholders were Toni-Ann Singh of Jamaica (as Miss World 2019), Zozibini Tunzi of South Africa (as Miss Universe 2019), Nia Franklin (as Miss America 2019), and Cheslie Kryst (as Miss USA 2019).

== Life and career ==
=== Early life ===
Garris was born on August 21, 2000, in New Haven, Connecticut. She is biracial; her father is African American, while her mother is white. Prior to being crowned Miss Teen USA, Garris was a dual enrolled student at Joseph A. Foran High School in Milford, Connecticut, and the ACES Educational Center for the Arts in New Haven, where she studied theatre. Throughout her life, Garris has participated in competitive dance, being trained in contemporary, jazz, pointe, hip hop, and tap. She founded the organization We Are People 1st, which assists people with disabilities, and was founded due to Garris's elder sister struggling with multiple disabilities; Garris has been recognized by the Connecticut Department of Developmental Services for her work.

After graduating from high school, Garris attended Southern Connecticut State University studying communications, while volunteering at Yale New Haven Hospital. Garris transferred to Arkansas State University in 2022, completing her collegiate career through their online honors program. In 2024, Garris graduate summa cum laude, with a Bachelors of Arts in Communication Studies.

=== Pageantry ===
Garris began her pageantry career as a teenager, competing in the National American Miss circuit and the Miss Connecticut's Outstanding Teen competition. She transitioned to the Miss Universe Organization in 2019, competing in Miss Connecticut Teen USA 2019 and winning the title on her first try.

As Miss Connecticut Teen USA, Garris was awarded the right to compete for Miss Teen USA 2019 in Reno, Nevada. She competed in the finals on April 28, 2019, at the Grand Sierra Resort, and was crowned the winner by outgoing titleholder Hailey Colborn, besting first runner-up Caitlyn Vogel of North Dakota. Following her win, Garris became the second titleholder from Connecticut to win Miss Teen USA, succeeding Logan West who was crowned Miss Teen USA 2012.

Following her win, she received national attention for wearing her natural afro-textured hair during the competition. Garris's reign was originally scheduled to end on spring 2020, but due to the circumstances over the COVID-19 pandemic, she became the longest reigning Miss Teen USA titleholder and surpassed Allison Brown's previous record of 546 days on October 26, 2020. She ended her reign on November 7, 2020, after crowning Kiʻilani Arruda as Miss Teen USA 2020, at Graceland in Memphis, Tennessee.

Awards and achievements
Preceded by (Kansas) Hailey Colborn	Miss Teen USA; 2019	Succeeded by (Hawaii) Kiʻilani Arruda
Preceded by Elle Sauli	Miss Connecticut Teen USA; 2019	Succeeded by Samantha Sarelli
