= Draper University =

Private for-profit school in San Mateo, California, United States

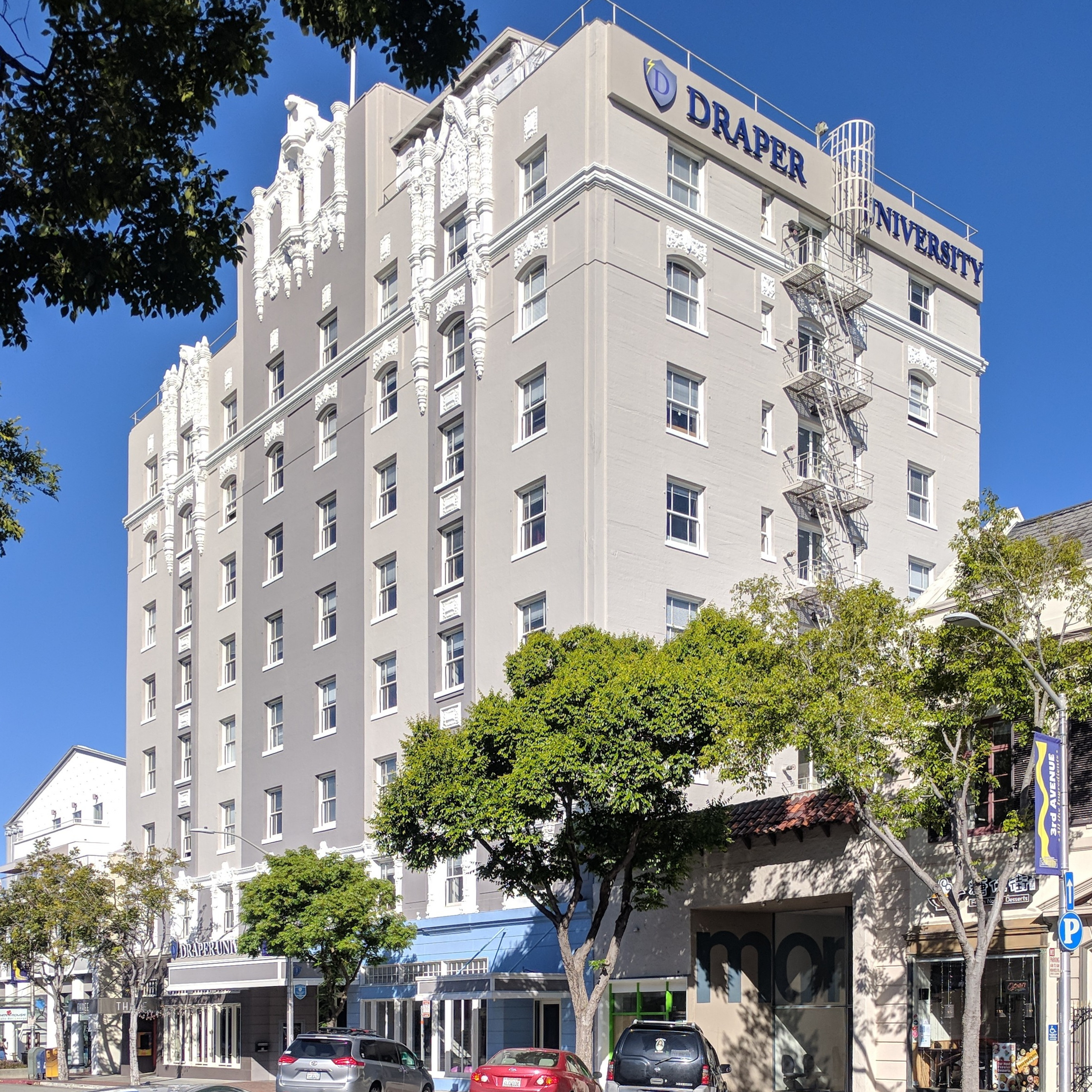
- Other name: Draper University of Heroes
- Type: For-profit school
- Established: 2012
- Founder: Tim Draper
- Location: San Mateo, California; 37.5635°N 122.3250°W
- Website: draperuniversity.com

Draper University, also known as Draper University of Heroes, is a private, for-profit school located in San Mateo, California, United States. Founded by venture capitalist Tim Draper in 2012, Draper University partnered with Arizona State University (ASU) in 2013 to offer students 15 course credits for a sixteen-week semester program. Prior to the partnership with ASU, the school was unaccredited.

== History ==
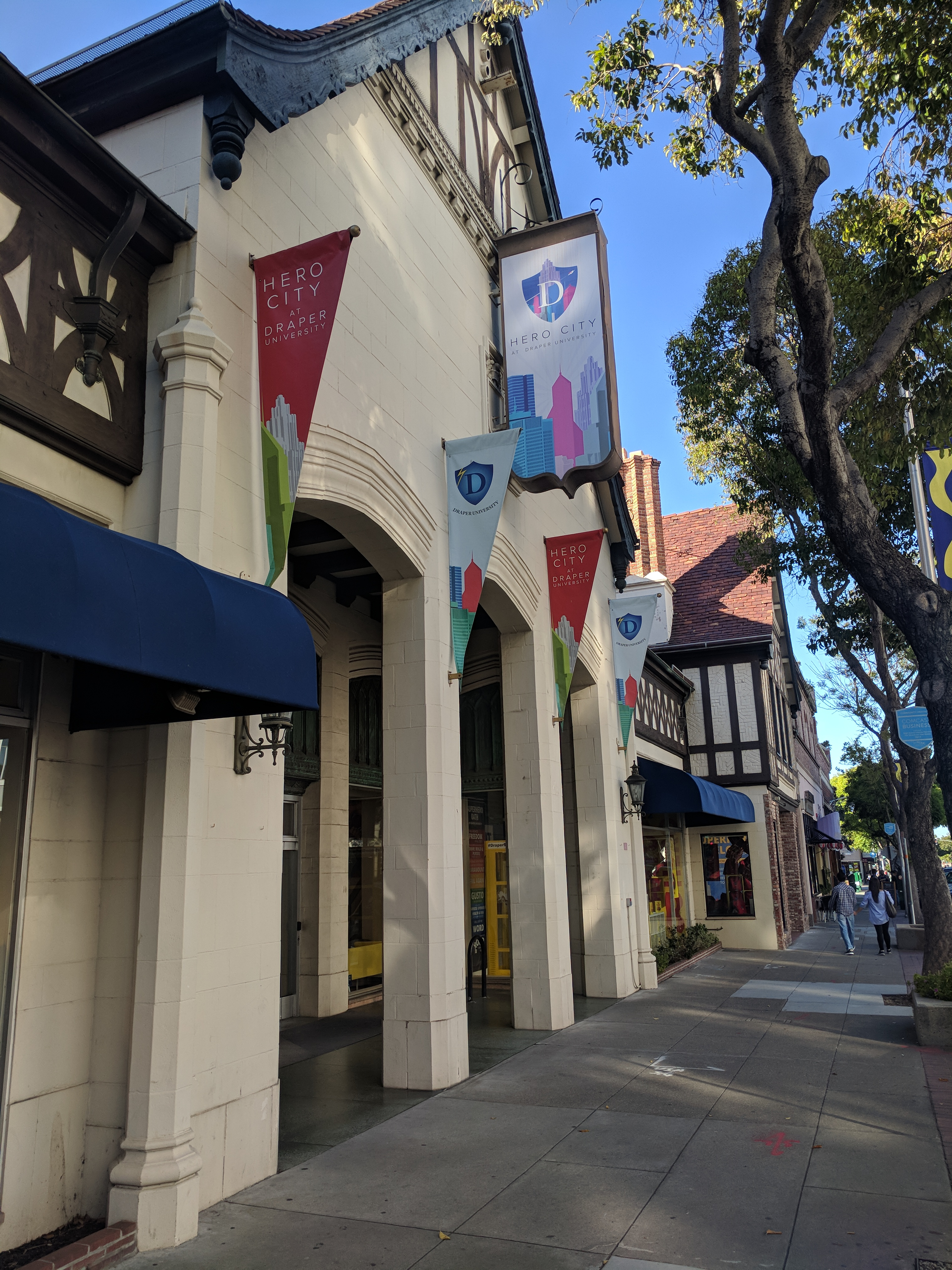
Hero City is across the street from the former Hotel Benjamin Franklin

In 2011, venture capitalist Tim Draper purchased the Hotel Benjamin Franklin building in San Mateo, California. Draper University was established in 2012 by Tim Draper, who is also the co-founder of Draper Fisher Jurvetson (DFJ). The school's first session had 40 students. Since then the school has grown to offer Fall, Spring and Summer programs for both students as well as executive education for CEO's and governmental officials.

In April 2015, a reality program called Startup U featured Draper University's seven-week program in a 10-episode series. The show included Miss USA 2013, Erin Brady, who joined the series to help develop and find investors for her company, Romeo in a Box.

Draper University formed a partnership with Arizona State University and Global Silicon Valley in May 2016 to launch an entrepreneurial program combining Draper's innovations in education with ASU's curriculum and large student body. Dubbed the ASU Draper GSV Accelerator, the program includes the Draper University entrepreneurial boot camp with a network of scholars. Six scholarships were given to ASU students to attend the program in 2015. Since then, Draper University has launched a new partnership, teaming up with ASU to offer 15 college credits and a certificate of entrepreneurship for the Fall 2017 program.

== Program ==
The Draper University runs a five to seven-week program with four sessions each year, but will begin its sixteen-week semester long program in Fall 2017. The program is primarily aimed at students aged 18 to 28, and has 500 alumni.

In addition to the program, Draper includes a co-working business incubator space called Hero City, VCx, a one-week program teaching early stage investment, and a one-week program aimed at executives adding innovation to corporations. Draper also offers online courses.

== Demographics ==
Draper's spring 2016 class was 45% female. The school previously offered scholarships for women including the Meera Kaul Foundation, Women Who Code, and SoGal. 45 percent of students are international. Unlike a traditional faculty, Draper has guest lecturers under a variety of themes.

== Pre-history of the Hotel Benjamin Franklin ==
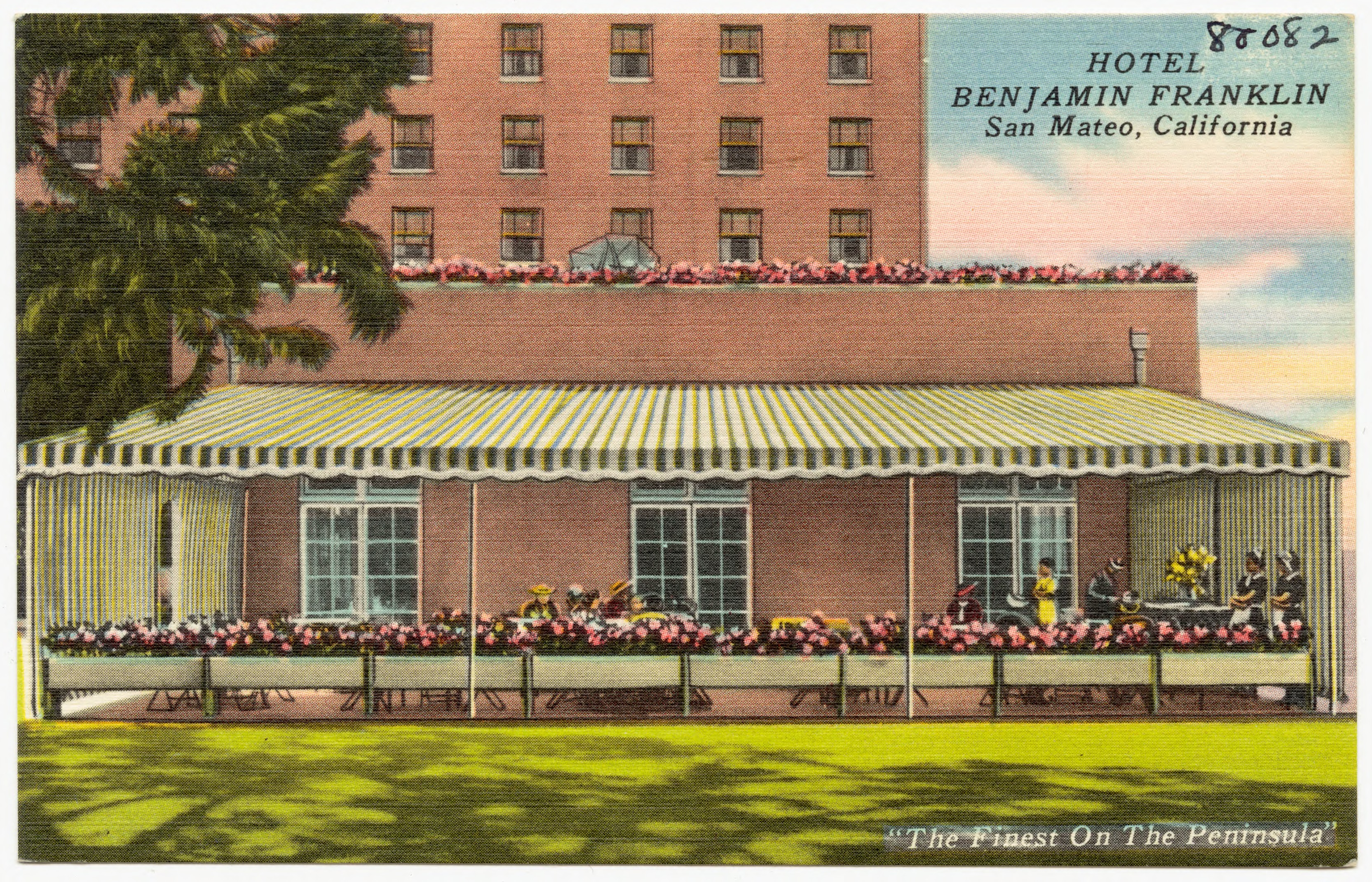
Hotel Benjamin Franklin, vintage postcard

In 2011, Tim Draper purchased the Hotel Benjamin Franklin building, which had first opened in San Mateo on June 28, 1927. The Benjamin Franklin (named not for the American statesman but as a composite of the original owners' names, A.C. Franklin and Benjamin Getz) succeeded the Peninsula Hotel, which was converted from Alvinza Hayward's mansion but had burned in 1920. The building was designed by local architect W. H. Weeks. It is nine stories high, exceeding 90 feet (27 m) at the flagpole. Churrigueresque decorative details can be seen around windows on the second, eighth, and ninth floors.

Notable guests at the Benjamin Franklin have included Ginger Rogers, Stan Laurel, Oliver Hardy, Friend Richardson, and Masanori Murakami.

The Benjamin Franklin had a longstanding relationship to provide temporary housing for United Airlines employees, which began in 1946 and lasted until 2003, when the airline filed for bankruptcy. In 1955, the hotel was purchased by the Max Best family, which ran it until it was sold to Westin in 1985. Westin in turn sold it to The Empire Group in 1989. The building was largely vacant aside from a ground-level bar and restaurant after United moved out, and was part of a larger property transfer from the Lembi Group to UBS AG in 2009 after Lembi fell behind on loan payments. Draper purchased the building in 2011 with the intent to redevelop it. Nearly a year later, Draper revealed plans to reopen Draper University as a boarding school. Draper had also acquired a two-story property across the street, intending to use it as classroom space.
