= Unified school district =

School body with both grade school and high school education

A unified school district (in the states of Arizona, California, Kansas and Oregon) or unit school district (in Illinois), in the United States of America, is a school district that generally includes and operates both primary schools (kindergarten through middle school or junior high) and high schools (grades 9–12) under the same district control.

This distinction is predominant in states where elementary school districts and high school districts are, or were, generally separate. The Los Angeles Unified School District is a major example of a unified school district in California. In California and Illinois, and possibly other states, unified or unit school districts are not the same as consolidated or union school districts, which are generally formed by the consolidation of multiple school districts of the same type.

In Kansas, the unified school districts developed after legislation was passed in 1962 that was intended to reduce the number of rural school districts. After the law's passage, the number of districts in Kansas dropped dramatically. In 1947, there were over 3,000 districts. After the unification law and establishment of unified school districts, their number dropped to under 400.

In Arizona, unified school districts elect 5 school board members. Common school districts have elected boards consisting of 3 members.

== Distinct uses of the term ==
Some states use the term "unified school district" to refer to different characteristics. For example:

- In Connecticut, a unified school district is a statewide school district serving students under the jurisdiction of a particular state department:
  - Unified School District #1 is under the Connecticut Department of Correction.
  - Unified School District #2 is under the Connecticut Department of Children and Families.
  - Unified School District #3 is under the Department of Developmental Services.
- In Vermont, a unified school district is a type of union school district, in which "the town school districts (and school boards) are abolished and representatives from the former districts are elected to form one school board."
- In Wisconsin, a unified school district is one type of school district. Its school board has "the powers and duties of the school board and annual meeting in a common school district."
