= Wichita Northwest High School =

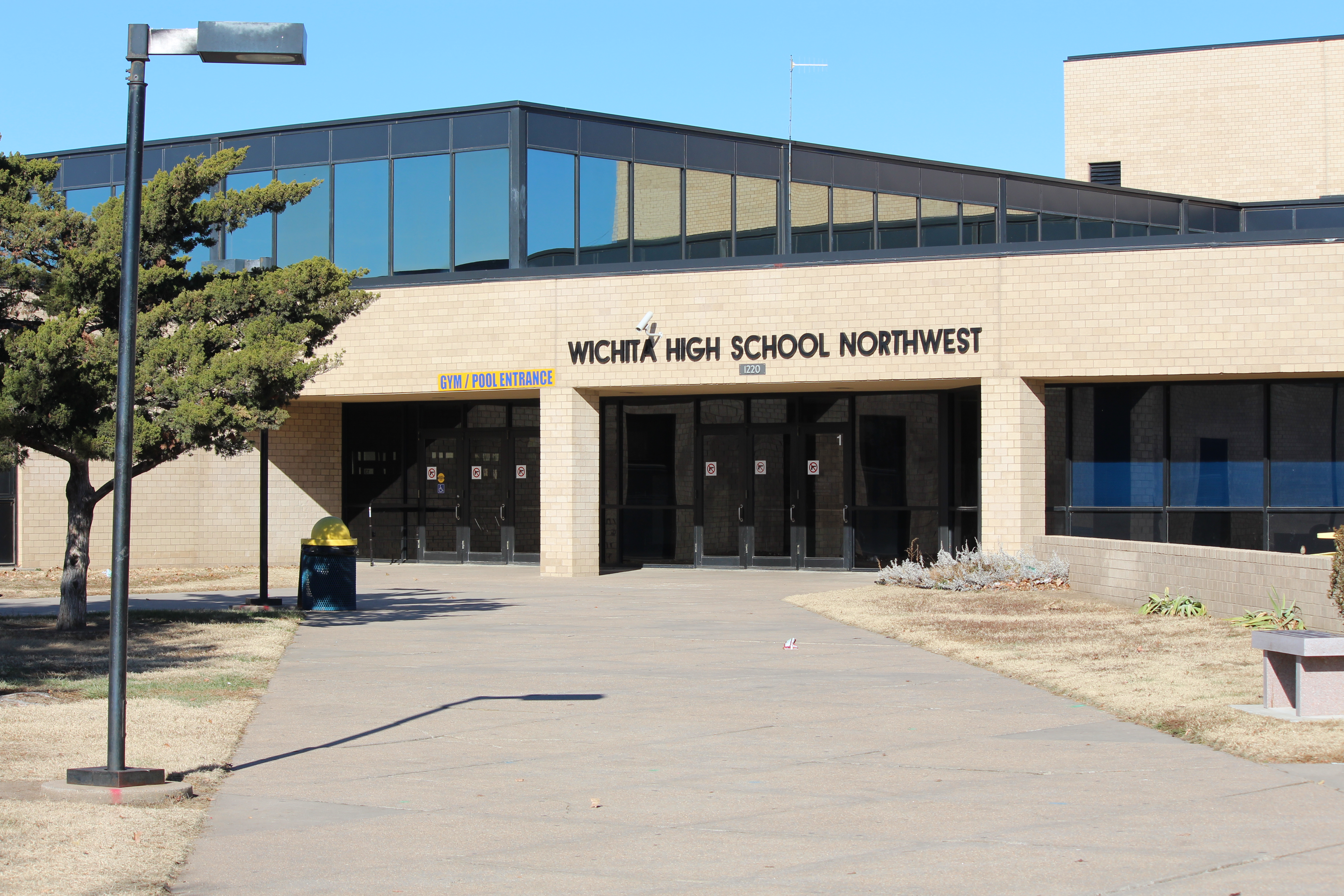
- Entrance in 2014

Location
- 1220 North Tyler Road; Wichita, Kansas 67212; United States; 37.706054°N 97.438834°W

Information
- School type: Public, High School
- Motto: Pride, Respect, Excellence
- Established: 1978
- School district: Wichita USD 259
- CEEB code: 173214
- Principal: David Self
- Teaching staff: 87.01 (FTE)
- Grades: 9 to 12
- Gender: Co-ed
- Enrollment: 1,435 (2023-2024)
- Student to teacher ratio: 16.49
- Campus type: Urban
- Colors: Royal Blue; Gold
- Fight song: Hail to the Northwest Grizzlies
- Athletics: Class 6A
- Athletics conference: Greater Wichita Athletic League
- Mascot: Grizzlies
- Rival: Bishop Carroll Catholic High School
- Newspaper: Northwest Explorer
- Yearbook: Silvertip
- Website: northwest.usd259.org

Wichita Northwest High School, known locally as Northwest High, is a public secondary school in Wichita, Kansas, United States. It is operated by Wichita USD 259 school district and serves 1,320 students in grades 9 to 12.

== History ==
The school's building was designed by local architects Schaefer & Associates PA. The school opened in 1978. The first principal, John Gasper, was hired in the Spring of 1977 in order to oversee building construction, develop academic programs, hire staff, and make other preparations necessary to open the $10.4 million facility.

== Facility ==
The school building features a commons area, which includes a student activity center, a dining facility, a study area, and an informal social gathering place. The commons area can also be used as a 330-seat theater. Surrounding the central commons are administrative offices, instructional areas, student lockers, and food service. An 800-seat auditorium is also located adjacent to the commons. The physical education complex, located at the terminus of one of the wings (referred to as "halls,") consists of a large multipurpose gymnasium with bleacher seating for 2,900 and a six-lane swimming pool short-course competition swimming pool with retractable bleachers for 400 spectators.

Northwest received multiple updates per a 2008 bond issue, such as: new tennis courts (completed 2010), new astroturf football field (completed 2009), new bleachers, permanent concessions stands and locker rooms in the football stadium, new physical education classroom (previously wrestling room), new wrestling room and weights room (previously north 1/3 of gym), new gymnasium (south of current gym; on current baseball field), as well as a new business department and more classrooms.

== Extracurricular activities ==
=== Athletics ===
Wichita Northwest is a member of the Kansas State High School Activities Association (KSHSAA) and competes in the 6A division. The following sports are offered:

- Baseball (boys)
- Basketball (boys & girls)
- Bowling (boys & girls)
- Cheerleading (coed)
- Cross country (boys & girls)
- Dance (girls)
- Football (boys)
- Golf (boys & girls)
- Soccer (boys & girls)
- Softball (girls)
- Swimming & diving (boys & girls)
- Tennis (boys & girls)
- Track (boys & girls)
- Volleyball (girls)
- Wrestling (boys)

=== State championships ===
| Season | Sport | Number of Championships | Year |
|---|---|---|---|
| Fall | Soccer, Boys | 2 | 1995, 2011 |
| Winter | Bowling, Boys | 3 | 2005, 2008, 2014 |
| Winter | Basketball, Boys | 1 | 2006 |
| Total | | 6 | |

=== Non-athletic activities ===
- Debate
- Drama/Theatre
- National Honor Society
- Explorer (newspaper)
- Quill and Scroll
- Scholars' Bowl
- Silvertip (yearbook)
- Student Senate
- Band

== Notable alumni ==
- Tony Barker, former NFL player
- Brandon Bonta (2021), professional bowler and winner of the 2026 PBA Players Championship
- Braeden Cloutier, former MLS player
- Hailey Colborn (2018), Miss Teen USA 2018
- Breece Hall (2019), NFL running back for the New York Jets
- Chris Harper (2008), former NFL player
- LeBaron Hollimon, soccer coach, former player
- L. J. Phillips (2023), college football running back for the Iowa Hawkeyes
- Jeff Richardson, former MLB player
- Phil Stacey (1997), American singer and finalist on American Idol Season 6
- Kamerion Wimbley (2002), former NFL player

== See also ==
- Education in Kansas
- List of high schools in Kansas
- List of unified school districts in Kansas
