= Miss Connecticut USA =

Beauty pageant competition

- Formation: 1952; 74 years ago
- Type: Beauty pageant
- Headquarters: Coral Springs
- Location: Florida
- Members: Miss USA
- Official language: English
- Key people: Barbara Ewald
- Website: Official website

Miss Connecticut USA is the pageant that selects the representative for the state of Connecticut in the Miss USA pageant, and the name of the title held by its winner. The pageant is directed by Ewald Productions.

Connecticut's most successful placement was in 2013, when Erin Brady was crowned Miss USA. Connecticut's most recent placement was in 2023, when Karla Aponte Roque placed in the Top 20.

The current titleholder is Jaeden Hamelly of New London and was crowned on May 24, 2026 at The Marriott Hartford in Windsor, Connecticut. Hamelly will represent Connecticut at Miss USA 2026.

== Gallery of titleholders ==
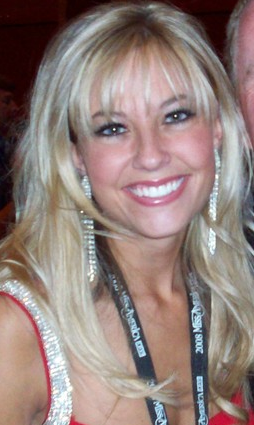
Ashley Bickford, Miss Connecticut USA 2010

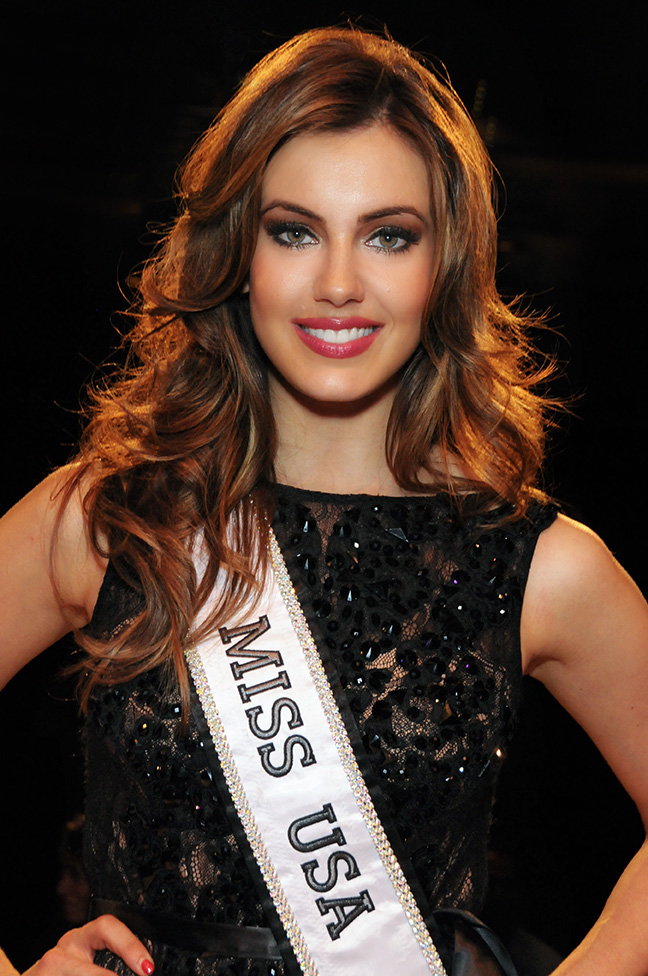
Erin Brady, Miss Connecticut USA 2013 and Miss USA 2013

== Results summary ==
- Miss USA: Erin Brady (2013)
- 1st Runners-Up: Diane Zabicki (1962), Pat Denne (1966)
- 4th Runner-Up: Alita Dawson (2002)
- Top 10/12: Tiffany Teixeira (2016), Cynthia Dias (2022), Jaeden Hamelly (2026)
- Top 15/20: Andrea Todd (1954), Joyce Trautwig (1960), Florence Mayette (1961), Janice Shilinsky (1968), Elizabeth Wanderman (1969), Monica Pietrzak (2009), Karla Aponte Roque (2023)

Connecticut holds a record of 14 placements at Miss USA.

== Winners ==
Color key

- Winner
- Runner-Up
- Semifinalist

Year	Name	Hometown	Age (Note: Age at the time of the Miss USA pageant)	Local title	Placement at Miss USA	Special awards at Miss USA	Notes
2026	Jaeden Hamelly	New London	30	Miss New London County	Top 10		
2025	Jenna Hofmann	Fairfield	23	Miss Fairfield			
2024	Shavana Clarke	Bridgeport	29	Miss Greater Bridgeport			
2023	Karla Aponte Roque	Branford	27	Miss Greater New Haven	Top 20		Previously Miss World Connecticut 2019
2022	Cynthia Moura Dias	Wolcott	22	Miss Wolcott	Top 12		Previously Miss Connecticut's Outstanding Teen 2014
2021	Amanda Torchia	Middlebury	25	Miss Middlebury			
2020	Chelsea Kathleen Demby	Farmington	23				
2019	Acacia Courtney	Hamden	26				Previously Miss Connecticut's Outstanding Teen 2009; Previously Miss Connecticut 2014
2018	Jamie Michelle Hughes	Stamford	27				
2017	Olga Yurievna Litvinenko	Greenwich	27				Previously Miss Connecticut Teen USA 2007
2016	Tiffany Ann Teixeira	Bridgeport	24		Top 10		Previously Miss Connecticut Teen USA 2009
2015	Ashley Monika Golebiewski	Berlin	21				
2014	Desirée Alyce Pérez	Greenwich	26				
2013	Erin Joyce Brady	East Hampton	26		Miss USA 2013		Top 10 at Miss Universe 2013
2012	Marie-Lynn Piscitelli	North Haven	26				Previously Miss Connecticut Teen USA 2001
2011	Regina Turner	Old Saybrook	21				
2010	Ashley Bickford	Torrington	24				Previously Miss Connecticut Teen USA 2002; Previously Miss Rhode Island 2007
2009	Monica Mary Pietrzak	Manchester	25		Top 15		Sister of Natalie Pietrzak, Miss Massachusetts USA 2012
2008	Jacqueline Honulik	Fairfield	21				
2007	Melanie Mudry	New Hartford	26				
2006	Jeannine Phillips	Lisbon	22				
2005	Melissa Mandak	Hamden	26				
2004	Sheila Marie Wiatr	Rocky Hill	24				
2003	Michelle LaFrance	Orange	24				
2002	Alita Hawaah Dawson	Hamden	22		4th Runner-Up		Previously Miss Connecticut Teen USA 1997
2001	Amy A. Vanderoef	Bristol	25				
2000	Sallie Elizabeth Toussaint	Hartford	25				Previously Top 10 at Miss World 1997
1999	Christina D'Amico	Hartford	25				
1998	Kristina Hughes	Pawcatuck	23				
1997	Christine Pavone	Shelton	23				
1996	Wanda Gonzalez	Hartford	24				
1995	Traci Bryant	New Haven	24				
1994	Mistrella Egan	Danbury	20				
1993	Alison Benusis	Ridgefield	20				Previously Miss Connecticut Teen USA 1991; Sister of Jennifer Benusis, Miss Connecticut USA 1986
1992	Catherine Sanchez	New Haven	26				
1991	Valorie Abate	North Haven	20				Later Miss Connecticut 1992
1990	Allison Dawn Barbeau-Diorio	Fairfield	19				Previously Miss Connecticut Teen USA 1987
1989	Lisa Vendetti	South Windsor	23				
1988	Catherine "Cathy" Galasso	Hamden	24				
1987	Jolene Marie Foy	Clinton	20				
1986	Jennifer Lynn Benusis	Ridgefield	18				Sister of Alison Benusis, Miss Connecticut Teen USA 1991 and Miss Connecticut USA 1993
1985	Adrianne Hazelwood	Hamden	17				Previously Miss Wisconsin Teen USA 1984
1984	Lynne Scalo	Bridgeport	24				
1983	Mary Lynn Seleman	Terryville	20				
1982	Maureen Szekeres	Shelton	20				
1981	Kelly Catherine Thompson	Monroe	20				
1980	Kristine Wilson	Farmington	23				
1979	Mary Beth Lombardi	Vernon	23				
1978	Martha Rose Szabo	Hartford	23				
1977	Susan Ridley "Sue" Crone	Meriden					
1976	Roslyn Ralph	Waterbury	23				
1975	Michele Menegay	Bethel					
1974	Valerie Ann Cappello	Bantam					
1973	Wendy Vecchiarino	Hartford					
1972	Diane Stevens	Hartford					
1971	Diane Turetzky	Waterford	18				
1970	Patricia Ann Matthews	Farmington					
1969	Elizabeth Wanderman	Hartford			Top 15		
1968	Janice Shilinsky	New Haven	19		Top 15	Top 15 Best in Swimsuit	Previously Miss Connecticut World 1966
1967	Linda E. Drew	Fairfield					
1966	Pat Denne	West Hartford	19		1st Runner-Up		
1965	Elizabeth A. "Betty" Matusko	Bridgeport					
1964	Patricia "Pat" Powell	Hartford					
1963	Gail Dinan	Hartford					
1962	Diane Marie Zabicki	Middletown			1st Runner-Up		
1961	Florene Mayette	Hartford			Top 15		
1960	Joyce Elaine Trautwig	Hartford			Top 15		
1959	Jayne Burghardt	Wethersfield	21				
1958	Dorothy Elizabeth Dillon	Willimantic	18				
1957	Rosemary Gale Galliotti	West Hartford	21				
1956	Dorothy Jean Bailey	Fairfield	19				
1955	Jane Louise Bartolotta	Middletown	23				
1954	Andrea Todd	Milford	23		Top 21		Finalist at Miss Connecticut USA 1953
1953	Beverly Rosemary Burlant	Bridgeport	21				Previously Miss Connecticut 1951
1952	Stella Josephine "Jo" Kuhlmann	Newton	23				
