= Ride of Fame =

Coordinates: 40.753947°N 73.986471°W

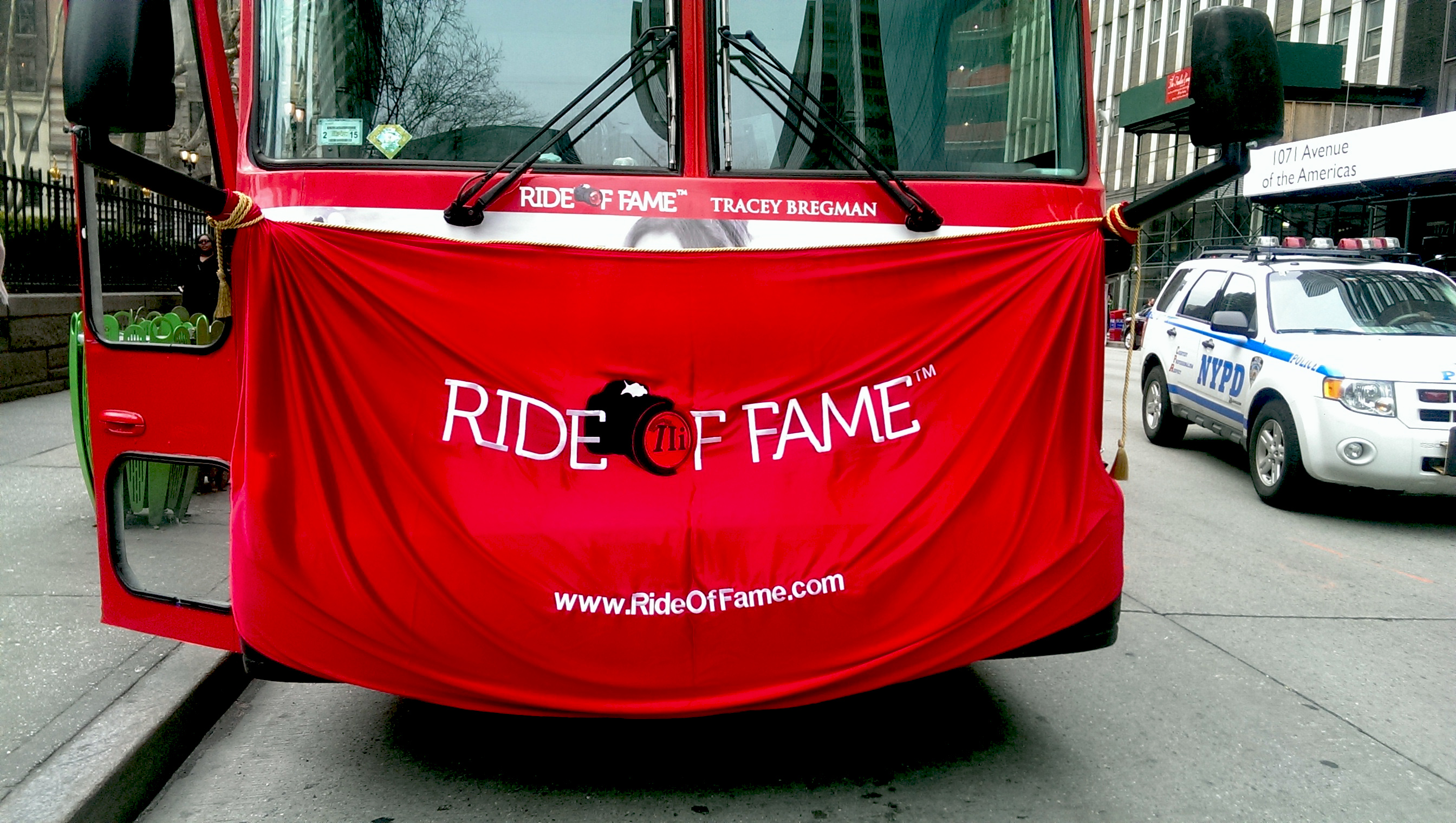
- Ride of Fame curtain covering the Tracey Bregman double-decker bus prior to its unveiling on April 7, 2014
- Established: May 4, 2010
- Location: New York City, New York
- Type: Celebrity Career Achievement
- Number of inductees: 56
- Director: David W. Chien (2010 - 2019)
- Website: www.rideoffame.com

The Ride of Fame is a continuing series of mobile monuments in New York City honoring public figures for being exemplary “New Yorkers” and representing the city in a positive light over the course of their lives. Ride of Fame alumni have also been bestowed with this honor simply for being the top celebrity in their respective fields of expertise. Each public figure honored by the Ride of Fame is presented with a personalized decal permanently applied to the front of a red double-decker bus as a time capsule in New York City. In 2012, inductees were also presented with a permanent seat decal on the top of the double-decker bus in addition to the front decal. The honorees write a special personal message on these seats to share the moment with all the visitors of New York City.

Non-New Yorkers, such as Australian musical duo Air Supply and Colombian singer Carlos Vives, have also been honored.

== History ==
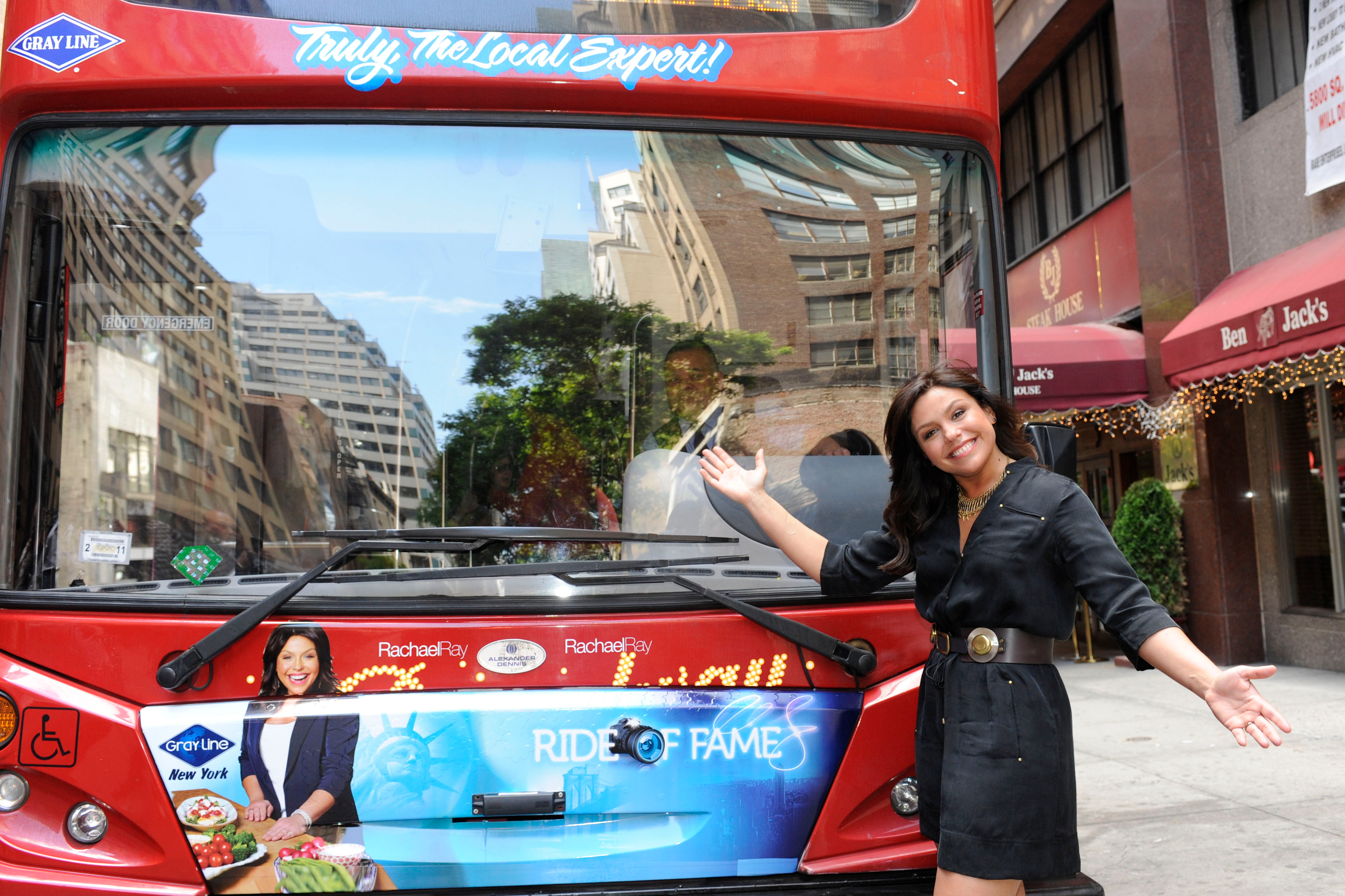
Rachael Ray posing with her Ride of Fame decal

The Ride of Fame's inaugural honoree was Emmy Award winner and bestselling author Rachael Ray in 2010. A ribbon-cutting ceremony took place in front of Ray's studio before she led a group of 50 fans on a tour atop her new bus that was dedicated in her honor. Though New York City was Gray Line Worldwide’s second licensed city around the world, the first being in Washington, D.C. in 1910, Gray Line Worldwide chose New York City as the site to celebrate its 100th anniversary in 2010.

Since Rachael Ray, monthly and bi-monthly ceremonies have taken place to present public figures with a decal for their own double-decker bus. Each public figure has had a ribbon cutting ceremony, most of which took place at Pier 78 on the Hudson River, but some ceremonies have taken place elsewhere, including Times Square and Central Park.

On October 13, 2012 during Air Supply's induction ceremony, the band was the first to be presented with a pair of honorary seats on the top deck of the bus along with a decal on the front. Air Supply also became the first to be inducted as an Immortal honoree; part of the IIi categorization in which each nominee is inducted as either Immortal, IT or imminent.

On April 29, 2014, Ride of Fame expanded outside of New York City. Jeff Conine of the Miami Marlins was the first recipient of a Ride of Fame honors in Miami. Since then, the Ride of Fame has honored recipients in Washington, D.C., with plans to be around the world, in cities with double-decker bus service.

== List of honorees ==
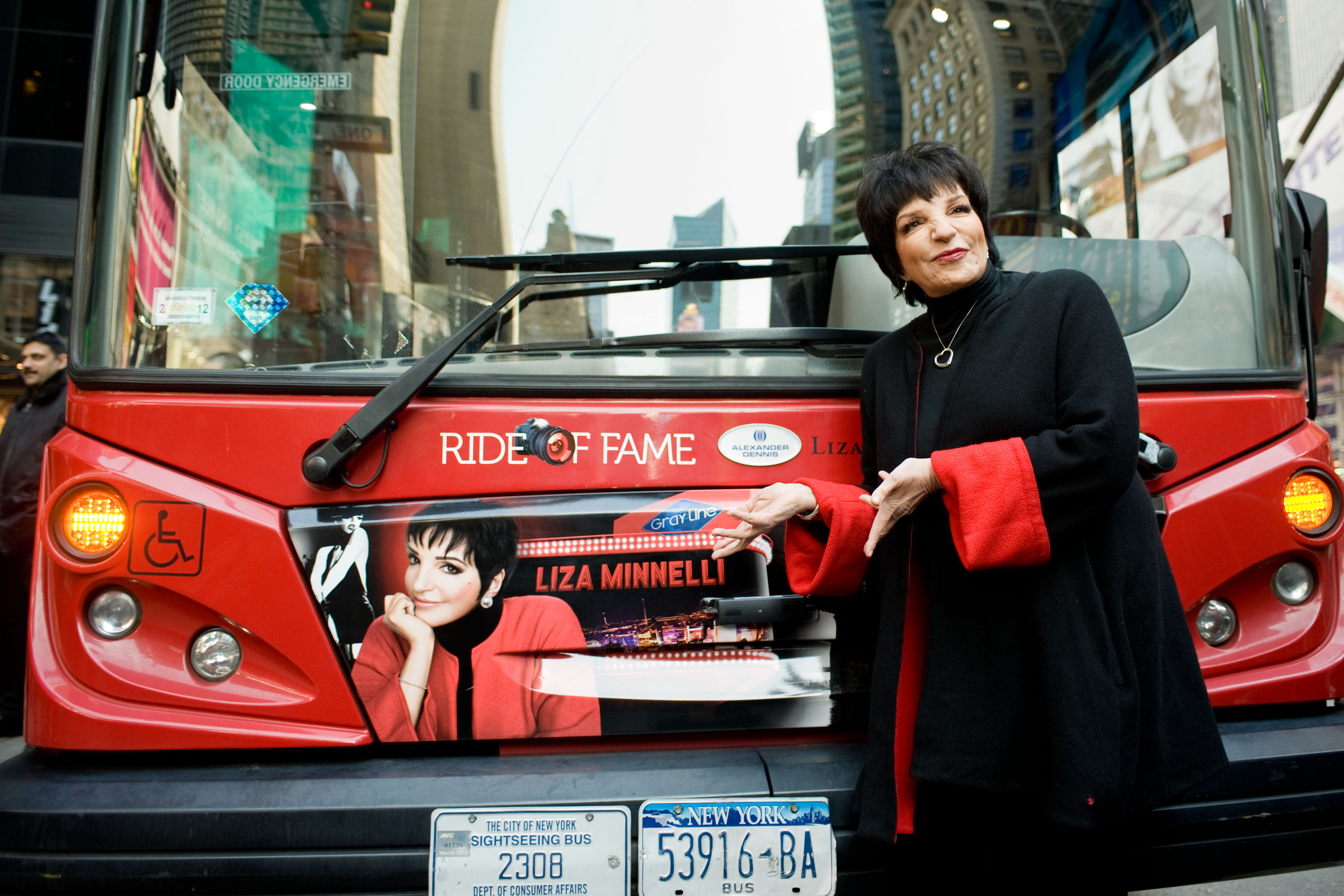
Liza Minnelli posing with her Ride of Fame decal

Honoree	Date of ROF Induction	IIi Classification*
Rachael Ray	May 4, 2010	–
Donald Trump	June 8, 2010	–
Whoopi Goldberg	July 26, 2010	–
Henrik Lundqvist	August 31, 2010	–
Reggie Jackson	October 18, 2010	–
Richard Dreyfuss	November 5, 2010	–
Cyndi Lauper	January 27, 2011	–
Liza Minnelli	March 8, 2011	–
Marc Anthony	September 8, 2011	–
Roger Maris	September 24, 2011	–
Kenneth Cole	November 18, 2011	–
Wheel of Fortune	May 14, 2012	–
Bernadette Peters & Mary Tyler Moore	August 21, 2012	–
Joe Namath	September 12, 2012	–
Walt Frazier	September 19, 2012	–
Vanessa Williams	September 27, 2012	–
Air Supply	October 13, 2012	Immortal
Dionne Warwick	November 12, 2012	Immortal
Joan Rivers & Melissa Rivers	March 1, 2013	Immortal
David Wright	April 3, 2013	IT
LL Cool J	May 13, 2013	Immortal
The Mowgli's	July 9, 2013	imminent
Erin Brady	August 5, 2013	imminent
Mariano Rivera	September 20, 2013	IT
Carol Alt	October 7, 2013	Immortal
Susan Lucci	November 19, 2013	Immortal
The Minions of Despicable Me 2	November 25, 2013	IT
Patrick Stewart	December 4, 2013	Immortal
Carly Rae Jepsen	February 25, 2014	IT
Tracey Bregman	April 7, 2014	Immortal
Jeff Conine**	April 29, 2014	Immortal
Fifth Harmony	July 11, 2014	imminent
Joe Theismann**	September 5, 2014	Immortal
Big & Rich	September 26, 2014	Immortal
Tony Danza	December 1, 2014	Immortal
Alex Ovechkin**	April 7, 2015	IT
Paul Shaffer	May 5, 2015	Immortal
Jeff Gordon	June 30, 2015	Immortal
David Copperfield	September 11, 2015	Immortal
Andrea Pirlo	September 22, 2015	Immortal
David Villa	September 22, 2015	Immortal
Frank Lampard	September 22, 2015	Immortal
John Wall**	October 26, 2015	IT
George Takei	December 10, 2015	Immortal
Darrelle Revis	December 29, 2015	IT
Kendall Schmidt	January 19, 2016	IT
Sheldon Harnick	May 11, 2016	Immortal
Lang Lang	September 20, 2016	IT
Jake Miller	October 11, 2016	imminent
Chazz Palminteri	December 20, 2016	Immortal
David Mazouz	October 4, 2017	imminent
James Maslow	December 6, 2017	IT
Carlos Vives	September 20, 2018	IT
Shin Lim	December 10, 2018	imminent

*The Ride of Fame began honoring nominees as either Immortal, IT or imminent with Air Supply on October 13, 2012.
**Denotes Honorees inducted in a city other than New York City, which began with Jeff Conine in Miami
