= Cecilio Asuncion =

Filipino-American director, producer, filmmaker, and executive

- Occupations: Director, producer, filmmaker
- Years active: 2012–present

Cecilio "Cece" Asuncion is a Filipino-American director, producer, filmmaker and executive. He is the founder, owner and director of Slay Model Management in Los Angeles.

== Background ==
Asuncion attended Ateneo De Manila Grade School and High School. He started his career by being an assistant production designer for television commercials under the tutelage of Gayl Vicente doing work for clients such as Johnson's Baby Powder, Hallmark cards, and San Miguel Beer. He also did production design work on a music video for the artist Jaya.

Asuncion is the recipient of the 2012 Outstanding Filipino-American award for LGBT advocacy.

Asuncion has spoken at several Universities and public events including New York University, Stanford University, PACE University, San Francisco State University, and the University of Colorado at Boulder.

He was a presenter at the Global Beauty Awards and Miss Teen USA 2018, featured in commercial for Tinder, and judged the Miss New Mexico USA Pageant, along with being a preliminary judge for the 2017 Miss Universe Pageant. In 2018, became the franchise owner and director of Miss Supranational USA.

== Thigh High Productions ==
Asuncion is a partner with Joshua Jones and Brian Anderson in Thigh High Productions, LLC. Together they created and co-produced Strut on Oxygen Network, What’s The T?, a documentary focused on five transgender women, and the documentary, Sayaw, a film that celebrates Philippine folk dance. THP has also produced commercial videos.

=== What's The T? ===
What’s the T?, edited by Israel Luna and released in 2014, is a documentary that explores the challenges, successes, and lives of five transgender women.

The film was an official selection of several film festivals including the Vegas Indie Film Fest, SoHo International Film Festival, Pensacola Lesbian & Gay Film Festival, Portland Lesbian & Gay Film Festival, Cinema Diverse Gay & Lesbian Film Festival in Palm Springs, Asians on Film Festival in Hollywood, and Frameline Film Festival in San Francisco. The film was voted Festival Favorite Cinema Diverse at the Palm Springs LGBT International Film Festival.

=== Strut ===
THP's partnership on Strut, with 44 Blue Productions and Whoopi Goldberg, included Asuncion as a cast participant, following his work as the director for Slay Model Management, the world's first transgender model agency. The project won the 2017 GLAAD Media Award for Outstanding Reality Series.

== Awards and recognition ==
- 2017 – GLAAD Media Award for Outstanding Reality Series
- 2012 – Outstanding Filipino American Award for LGBT Advocacy
