= Karen Link =

American NFL Cheerleader

Karen Link is an NFL Cheerleader for the New England Patriots. She was born and raised in Terryville, Connecticut, and attended Endicott College in Beverly, Massachusetts, where she graduated with a degree in communications. Link won the title of Miss Connecticut's Outstanding Teen in 2007 and went on to compete in Miss America's Outstanding Teen pageant. Her competition talent was a Spanish-influenced tap dance.

Shortly after returning from the national pageant, Link was a passenger in a head-on collision and suffered a broken spine. After emergency surgery and rehabilitation, Link began dancing again. In 2014, she was chosen to join the New England Patriots Cheerleaders and cheered at Super Bowl XLIX where the New England Patriots defeated the Seattle Seahawks. Link became captain of the Patriots Cheerleaders in 2016 and cheered at her second Super Bowl (Super Bowl LI), where the New England Patriots defeated the Atlanta Falcons.
