= Startup U =

- Genre: Reality television
- Starring: Tim Draper; Sequoia Blodgett; Charlie Taibi
- Country of origin: United States
- Original language: English
- No. of seasons: 1
- No. of episodes: 10

Production
- Producers: Mike Duffy; Tim Duffy
- Production company: Ugly Brother Studios

Original release
- Network: Freeform
- Release: August 11 – October 15, 2015

Startup U is an American reality television series that premiered on August 11, 2015, on Freeform (then ABC Family). The show is about students in an entrepreneur mentoring program in Silicon Valley.

Startup U is based on Draper University, a 7-week residential program in entrepreneurship.

== Cast ==
- Tim Draper, founder of Draper University.
- Sequoia Blodgett, Draper University entrepreneur in residence.
- Charlie Taibi, Draper University program director.
- Erin Brady
- Tony Capasso
- John Randolph Parkhill Frye
- Shawn Isaac
- David Kram
- Ana Marte
- Carly Martinetti
- Keyonna Patterson
- Malcolm Jamaal Tyson
- Sharon Winter

== Format ==
Startup U follows 10 entrepreneurial techies looking to make names for themselves. Each founder endures a grueling seven-week program at Draper University, a program led by billionaire founder and venture capitalist Tim Draper. The series is produced by Ugly Brother Studios, a Sky Vision partner.

== Episodes ==
| No. | Title | Original release date | U.S. viewers (millions) |
|---|---|---|---|
| 1 | "Welcome to Draper University" | August 11, 2015 | 0.22 |
| 2 | "The Hack-a-Thon" | August 18, 2015 | 0.10 |
| 3 | "Chain Reaction" | August 25, 2015 | 0.05 |
| 4 | "Bro's and Bras" | September 1, 2015 | 0.06 |
| 5 | "6 Degrees to Nowhere" | September 10, 2015 | 0.11 |
| 6 | "The Great Outdoors" | September 17, 2015 | 0.06 |
| 7 | "Not So Fair" | September 24, 2015 | 0.06 |
| 8 | "Motivation" | October 1, 2015 | 0.07 |
| 9 | "Prototypes, Partners & Pitches" | October 8, 2015 | 0.11 |
| 10 | "Fund Me" | October 15, 2015 | 0.08 |
