= Chris Harper (wide receiver, born 1989) =

American football player (born 1989)

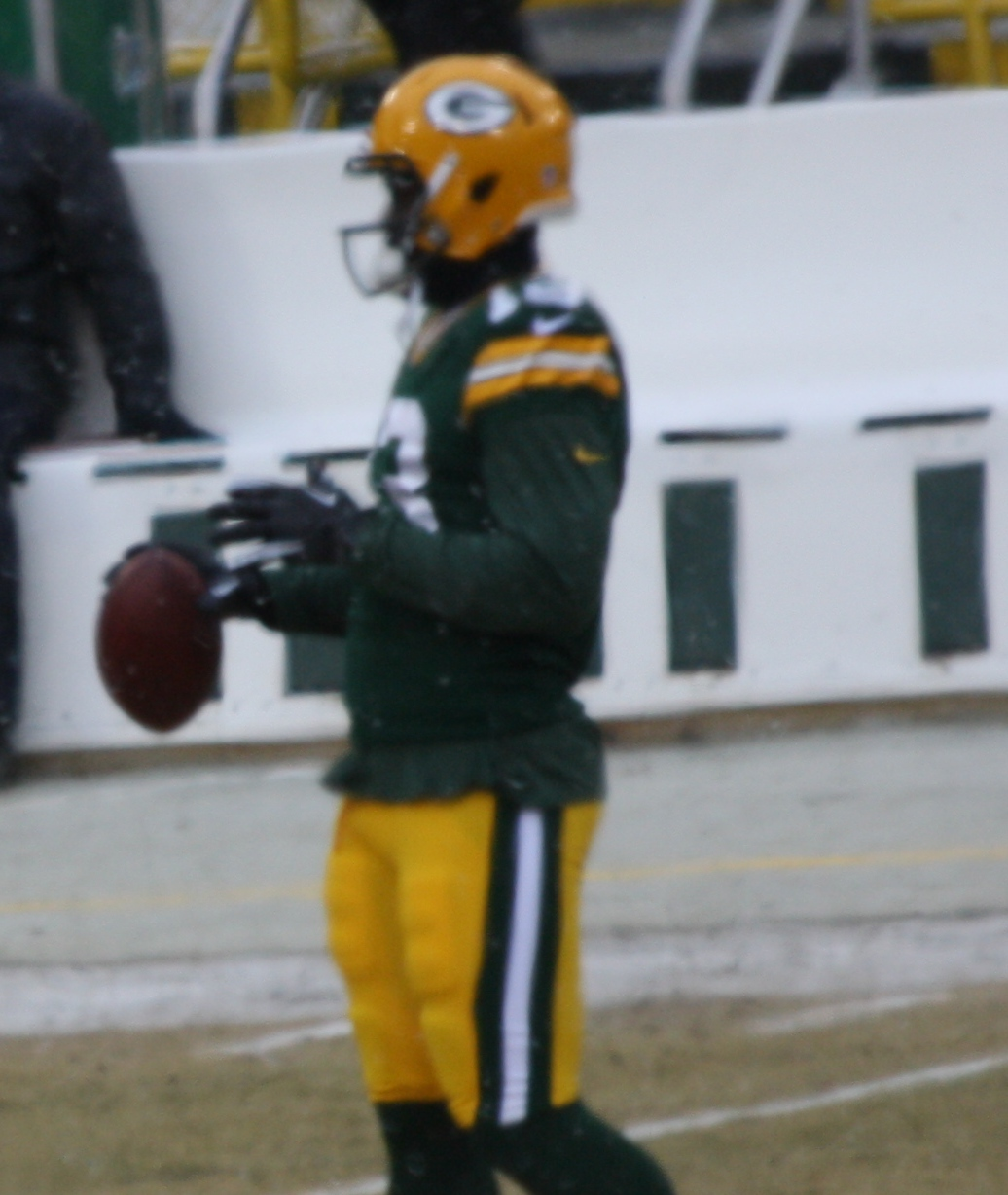
- Harper with the Green Bay Packers in 2013

No. 13, 10
- Position: Wide receiver

Personal information
- Born: September 10, 1989 (age 37); Wichita, Kansas, U.S.
- Listed height: 6 ft 1 in (1.85 m)
- Listed weight: 228 lb (103 kg)

Career information
- High school: Northwest (Wichita)
- College: Kansas State
- NFL draft: 2013: 4th round, 123rd overall pick

Career history
- Seattle Seahawks (2013)*; San Francisco 49ers (2013)*; Green Bay Packers (2013); New York Giants (2014−2015)
- * Offseason or practice squad member only

Awards and highlights
- Second-team All-Big 12 (2012)
- Stats at Pro Football Reference

Christopher Deon Harper (born September 10, 1989) is an American former professional football player who was a wide receiver in the National Football League (NFL). He played college football for the Kansas State Wildcats, and was selected by the Seattle Seahawks in the fourth round of the 2013 NFL draft. Harper was also a member of the San Francisco 49ers, the Green Bay Packers and the New York Giants.

== Early life ==
Harper was born in Wichita, Kansas. He attended Northwest High School in Wichita, and played high school football for the Northwest Grizzlies. As a quarterback, he completed 55 percent of his passes while accumulating 761 yards and eight passing touchdowns. He also rushed for 506 yards and 10 scores his senior year for the Grizzlies, who ended the year with a 7-3 record and advanced the first round of the state playoffs. Considered a four-star recruit by Rivals.com, he was rated the No.10 athlete in the nation. He accepted a scholarship offer from University of Oregon over offers from Kansas State, Missouri and Notre Dame.

== College career ==
Harper initially attended the University of Oregon, and was a member of the Oregon Ducks football team in 2008. He started his college career at quarterback, but converted from quarterback to wide receiver after the first five games. He caught nine passes for 122 yards and two touchdowns and also rushed for 137 yards on 35 carries (3.9 yards per carry) for two touchdowns. At the end of the season, Harper announced that he would be leaving the Oregon Ducks, and would transfer closer to home.

After transferring to Kansas State University, Harper played for the Kansas State Wildcats football team from 2010 to 2012. After red-shirting a year due to his transfer, he played in all 13 games in 2010, starting seven. He totaled 25 catches for 330 yards and four touchdowns. As a junior in 2011, he led the team in receptions (40), receiving yards (547) and touchdown receptions (5). In his final season of eligibility, he once again led the team in receptions (58) and receiving yards (857), and was second in touchdown receptions (3) and was named to the All-Big 12 Conference second-team.

== Professional career ==
Pre-draft measurables
Height	Weight	Arm length	Hand span	40-yard dash	10-yard split	20-yard split	20-yard shuttle	Three-cone drill	Vertical jump	Broad jump	Bench press
6 ft 0 3/4 in (1.85 m)	229 lb (104 kg)	32 3/4 in (0.83 m)	9 3/4 in (0.25 m)	4.45 s	1.57 s	2.63 s	4.26 s	6.89 s	35.5 in (0.90 m)	9 ft 8 in (2.95 m)	20 reps

Harper was selected by the Seattle Seahawks in the fourth round, with the 123rd overall pick, of the 2013 NFL draft. On August 31, 2013, Harper was waived during the final roster cuts, becoming the second highest 2013 draftee to not make his NFL team's opening day roster.

The San Francisco 49ers signed him off of the Seahawks practice roster on September 2, 2013. The 49ers later waived Harper on October 17, 2013.

The Green Bay Packers claimed WR Chris Harper off waivers from the San Francisco 49ers on October 18, 2013. He made his NFL regular season debut, playing special teams coverage. He was released on August 24, 2014.

On October 14, 2014, Harper signed with the New York Giants and was placed on the practice squad. On December 29, 2014, he signed a reserve/future contract to remain on the Giants. On August 7, 2015, Harper was waived/injured by the Giants. On the following day, he cleared waivers and was reverted to the Giants' injured reserve list. On September 28, 2015, he was released by the Giants with an injury settlement.

== Music career ==
In October 2017, Harper made his music debut by releasing his first single titled "Just for Me".

== Coaching career ==
Harper signed with Athletes Untapped as a private football coach on August 15, 2024.
