= Hailey Colborn =

American beauty pageant titleholder

- Born: October 10, 2000 (age 25); Wichita, Kansas, U.S.
- Education: Princeton University
- Height: 5 ft 4 in (1.63 m)
- Beauty pageant titleholder
- Title: Miss Kansas Teen USA 2018; Miss Teen USA 2018
- Hair color: Brown
- Eye color: Brown
- Major competitions: Miss Kansas Teen USA 2018; (Winner); Miss Teen USA 2018; (Winner)

Hailey Colborn (born October 10, 2000) is an American beauty pageant titleholder who was crowned Miss Teen USA 2018. She is the second entrant from Kansas to win the title after Keylee Sue Sanders won Miss Teen USA 1995.

== Life and career ==
=== Biography ===
Colborn was born in Wichita, Kansas to parents Kevin and Denise Colborn, and trained in classical ballet for 14 years. While a student, she started the mentorship program SelfPosi, which she uses to travel to middle schools to talk to girls about the importance of self-love. Colborn graduated from Wichita Northwest High School in 2018. While in high school, she was class president. Colborn attended Princeton University, studying English Literature and graduating in 2022. As of 2023, she leads an online Substack and TikTok community of "hot, cool, well-read people" called "Hot Literati."

=== Pageantry ===
In 2017, Colborn competed in the Miss Kansas Teen USA 2018 competition, representing Greater Wichita. She went on to win the competition, and was crowned Miss Kansas Teen USA 2018 by outgoing titleholder Malerie Moore. She had previously competed in the Miss Kansas' Outstanding Teen 2016 competition, where she was the first runner-up and a finalist in the fitness and talent categories. As Miss Kansas Teen USA 2018, Colborn earned the right to represent Kansas at the Miss Teen USA 2018 competition in Shreveport, Louisiana. She competed in the final on May 18, 2018 in Hirsch Memorial Coliseum, and was crowned the winner, besting first runner-up Kirby Elizabeth Self of South Carolina. She is the second entrant from Kansas to win the crown.

Colborn completed her reign on April 28, 2019, after crowning Kaliegh Garris of Connecticut as her successor at the Miss Teen USA 2019 competition in Reno, Nevada.

Awards and achievements
Preceded by (Missouri) Sophia Dominguez-Heithoff	Miss Teen USA; 2018	Succeeded by (Connecticut) Kaliegh Garris
Preceded by Malerie Moore	Miss Kansas Teen USA; 2018	Succeeded by Hunter Fraley
