= Miss Teen USA 2019 =

37th edition of the Miss Teen USA competition

- Date: April 28, 2019
- Presenters: Nia Sanchez; Tim Tialdo
- Venue: Grand Sierra Resort, Reno, Nevada
- Broadcaster: Facebook; PlayStation Network; Xbox Live; YouTube
- Entrants: 51
- Placements: 15
- Winner: Kaliegh Garris; Connecticut

Miss Teen USA 2019 was the 37th Miss Teen USA pageant. It was held at the Grand Sierra Resort in Reno, Nevada, on April 28, 2019, and was hosted by Miss USA 2014 Nia Sanchez and Tim Tialdo. Hailey Colborn of Kansas crowned her successor Kaliegh Garris of Connecticut at the end of the event. This was the first time in the history of Miss Teen USA winning back-to-back titles by African Americans.

The 2019 competition served as the second consecutive time that the pageant has been held concurrently with the Miss USA competition. For the first time, both the preliminary and final competitions were held on the same day.

== Pageant ==
=== Selection of contestants ===
51 delegates from the 50 states and the District of Columbia were selected in state pageants held from September 2018 to January 2019.

=== Preliminary round ===
Prior to the final competition, the delegates competed the preliminary competition, which involved private interviews with the judges and a presentation show where they competed in athletic wear and evening gown. It was held on April 28 at the Grand Sierra Resort in Reno-Tahoe. For the first time since 2017, the preliminary round was broadcast.

=== Finals ===
During the final competition, the Top 15 finalists competed in athletic wear, evening gown and in a customized final question round, and the winner was decided by a panel of judges.

=== Broadcasting ===
The pageant was webcast on the pageant's Facebook and YouTube pages, as downloadable live events available on the Asian and American PlayStation Stores for PlayStation 4 consoles and on Xbox Live in 41 regions for the Xbox One line of consoles via the Facebook Video application, with support for 4K Ultra HD, Dolby Vision and HDR10 video (Note: 4K/HDR video available on the Xbox One S and X models only) and Dolby Atmos spatial audio.

== Results ==
=== Placements ===
Placement	Contestant
Miss Teen USA 2019	Connecticut — Kaliegh Garris
1st Runner-Up	North Dakota — Caitlyn Vogel
2nd Runner-Up	Nevada — Erica Yvette Bonilla
3rd Runner-Up	Mississippi — Kaylee Brooke McCollum
4th Runner-Up	Alabama — Kalin Burt
Top 15	Arkansas — Maggie Williams; Illinois — A'Maiya Allen; Kansas — Hannah DeBok; Maryland — Amalia Sanches; Massachusetts — Annie Lu; Nebraska — Erin Shae Swanson; Oklahoma — Abigail Billings; South Carolina — Allie Richardson; Tennessee — Bailey Guy; Wyoming — Grace Turner

== Contestants ==
The 51 delegates were:

State	Contestant	Age (Note: Ages at the time of the pageant)	Hometown	Placement	Notes
Alabama	Kalin Burt	19	Tuscaloosa	4th runner-up	
Alaska	Meghan Scott	17	Eagle River		
Arizona	Jordan Waller	17	Peoria		
Arkansas	Maggie Williams	17	Piggott	Top 15	
California	Alina Rae Carranza	18	Los Angeles		
Colorado	Sydney Boehler	19	Fort Collins		Later Top 15 semifinalist at Miss Colorado USA 2021
Connecticut	Kaliegh Garris	18	New Haven	Miss Teen USA 2019	
Delaware	Myah Rosa-Scott	18	New Castle		
District of Columbia	Jaclyn Davis	19	Washington, D.C.		
Florida	Katia Gerry	17	Jacksonville		Later Teen Miss Earth USA 2021; Later top 15 at Miss California USA 2022
Georgia	Isabella Bloedorn	15	Acworth		
Hawaii	Leimakamae Freitas	18	Kailua-Kona		
Idaho	Tess Romani	19	Boise		
Illinois	A'Maiya Allen	19	Bolingbrook	Top 15	
Indiana	Catelyn Combellick	15	Carmel		
Iowa	Kristen Hovda	18	Cedar Rapids		Sister of Miss Iowa Teen USA 2009 Allyson Hovda
Kansas	Hannah DeBok	18	Olathe	Top 15	
Kentucky	Emma Johns	17	Pikeville		
Louisiana	Emma Brooks McAllister	16	Houma		
Maine	Mara Carpenter	17	Camden		Later 3rd runner-up at Miss Maine USA 2023
Maryland	Amalia Sanches	18	Bethesda	Top 15	
Massachusetts	Annie Lu	18	Cambridge	Top 15	
Michigan	Alexis Lubecki	17	Canton		
Minnesota	Olivia Herbert	16	Andover		
Mississippi	Kaylee Brooke McCollum	18	Amory	3rd runner-up	Later Miss Mississippi USA 2024
Missouri	Abilene Lortz	15	St. James		
Montana	Megan Brewer	17	Melstone		Later 1st Runner-Up at Miss Montana USA 2023
Nebraska	Erin Shae Swanson	18	Norfolk	Top 15	
Nevada	Erica Yvette Bonilla	18	Las Vegas	2nd runner-up	
New Hampshire	Jadyn McDonough	19	Bedford		Later Top 10 at Miss South Carolina USA 2022
New Jersey	Ava Tortorici	18	Montclair		
New Mexico	Angela Nañez	15	Clovis		
New York	Hailey Germano	18	Smithtown		
North Carolina	Eliza Minor	15	Charlotte		
North Dakota	Caitlyn Vogel	18	Minot	1st runner-up	Later Miss North Dakota USA 2021 and 1st runner-up at Miss USA 2021
Ohio	Isabelle Jedra	18	Mansfield		
Oklahoma	Abigail Billings	18	Woodward	Top 15	
Oregon	Mackenzie Peterson	17	Klamath Falls		
Pennsylvania	Julia Meckley	17	Villanova		
Rhode Island	Olivia Volpe	18	Cranston		
South Carolina	Allie Richardson	18	Lexington	Top 15	
South Dakota	Shelby Specht	18	Sioux Falls		
Tennessee	Bailey Guy	16	Hendersonville	Top 15	Later USA National Teen 2021
Texas	Kennedy Edwards	18	Houston		First African-American Miss Texas Teen USA
Utah	Kaylyn Slevin	18	Salt Lake City		Later became a member of the Los Angeles Charger Girls
Vermont	Jenna Howlett	16	Bridport		Later Miss Vermont USA 2023
Virginia	Morgan Duty	17	Lebanon		
Washington	Lily Lloyd	17	Orting		
West Virginia	Brennah Groves	18	Summersville		
Wisconsin	Sydney Bobinski	17	Mosinee		
Wyoming	Grace Turner	18	Jackson	Top 15	Later 1st Runner-Up at Miss Wyoming USA 2023

== Judges ==
- MJ Acosta – sports broadcaster
- Kristin Collin – businesswoman, music executive, and artist manager
- Ivette Fernandez – businesswoman and executive
- Katherine Haik – Miss Teen USA 2015 from Louisiana
- Shannon Keel – general manager of the Grand Sierra Resort
- Kristen Remington – news anchor, Miss Nevada Teen USA 1999
