= Miss Connecticut Teen USA =

Beauty pageant competition

- Formation: 1983
- Type: Beauty pageant
- Headquarters: Coral Springs
- Location: Florida
- Members: Miss Teen USA
- Official language: English
- Exec. Director: Barbara Ewald
- Budget: 300,000
- Website: Official website

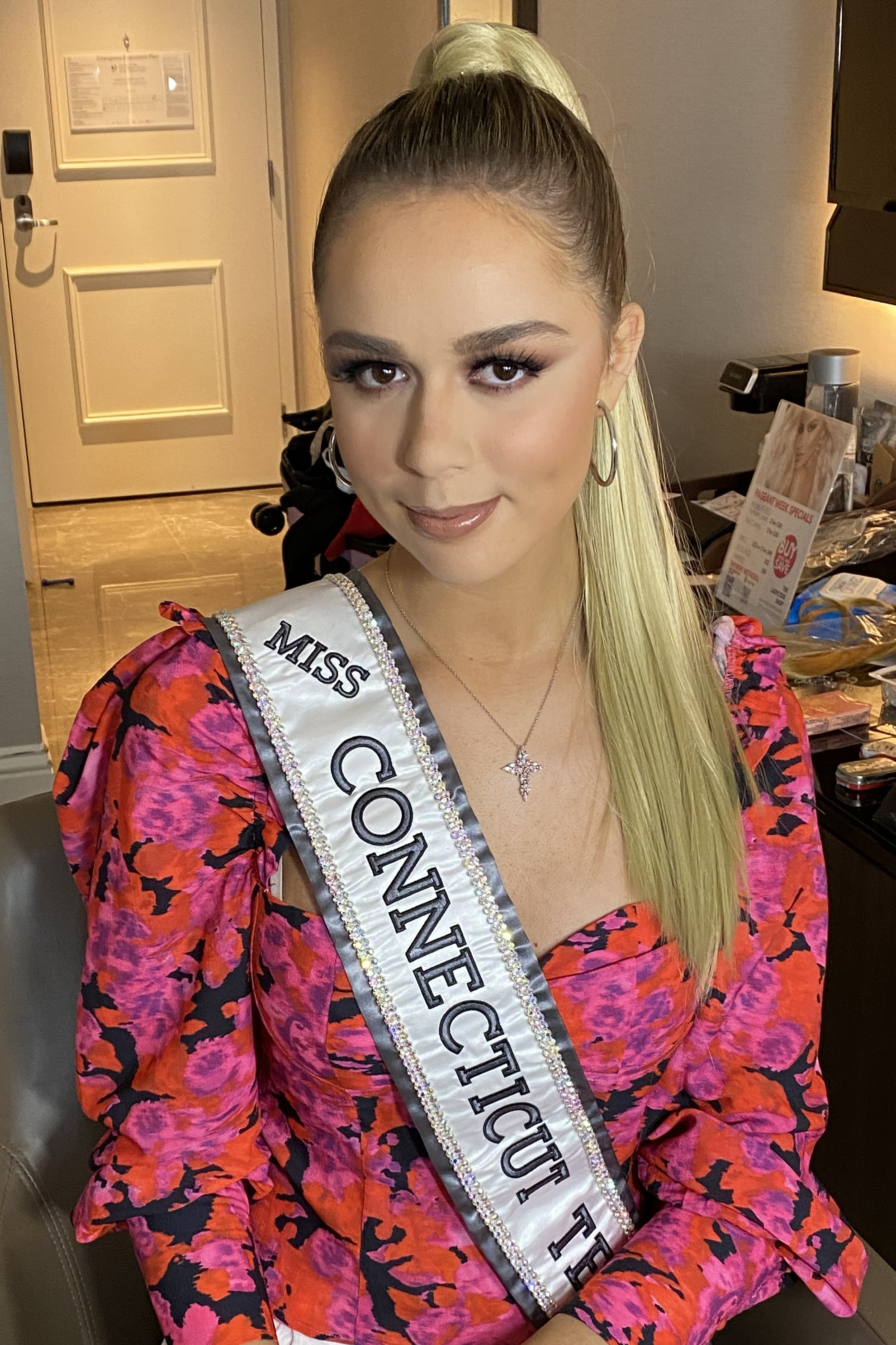
Miss Connecticut Teen USA 2020 Samantha Sarelli

The Miss Connecticut Teen USA competition is the pageant that selects the representative for the state of Connecticut in the Miss Teen USA pageant.

The state pageant directors are:

- Crown Productions from 2003 to 2008
- Sanders & Associates, Inc., dba- Pageant Associates based in Buckhannon, West Virginia from 2009 to 2017
- Five Crown Pageant Productions based in Washington, D.C. from 2018 to 2019
- Ewald Productions from 2020

Connecticut has been one of the least successful states at Miss Teen USA. In 2002, Ashley Bickford's placement followed the 4th runner-up placement of Miss Connecticut USA Alita Dawson, who had previously been Miss Connecticut Teen-USA 1997. This was Connecticut's highest joint placement, and the highest joint placement of any state that year. Dawson was one of four Miss Connecticut Teen-USA titleholder to later win the Miss Connecticut-USA title.

The state has produced two Miss Teen USA winners: Logan West who was crowned Miss Teen USA 2012, and Kaliegh Garris who was crowned Miss Teen USA 2019.

Maggie Peterson of Hartford was crowned Miss Connecticut Teen USA 2026 on May 24, 2026, at Marriott Airport Hotel in Windsor. She represented Connecticut at Miss Teen USA 2026.

== Results summary ==
=== Placements ===
- Miss Teen USAs: Logan West (2012), Kaliegh Garris (2019)
- Top 10: Ashley Bickford (2002)
- Top 12: Cynthia Schneck (1993)
- Top 16: Samantha Sarelli (2020)
- Top 20: Maggie Peterson (2026)

Connecticut holds a record of 6 placements at Miss Teen USA.

=== Awards ===
- Miss Congeniality: Allison Barbeau-Diorio (1987)
- Miss Photogenic: Maggie Peterson (2026)

== Winners ==
Color key

- Declared as Winner
- Ended as runner-up
- Ended as one of the finalists or semifinalists

Year	Name	Hometown	Age^{1}	Local title	Placement at Miss Teen USA	Special awards at Miss Teen USA	Notes
2026	Maggie Peterson	Hartford	17	Miss West Simsbury Teen	Top 20	Miss Photogenic	
2025	Daviana Mary Plaza	North Franklin	18	Miss Windham Teen			
2024	Ava Celentano	North Haven	14	Miss North Haven Teen			
2023	Jade Ferdinand	Stamford	19	Miss Stamford Teen			
2022	Mya Xeller	New Haven	17	Miss New Haven County Teen			
2021	Nikitha Kikanamada	South Windsor	19	Miss South Windsor Teen			First Indian American Miss Connecticut Teen USA
2020	Samantha Sarelli	Westport	18		Top 16		
2019	Kaliegh Garris	New Haven	18		Miss Teen USA 2019		
2018	Elle Sauli	Newtown	17				
2017	Lana Coffey	New Canaan	18				
2016	Katy Brown	Hebron	18				
2015	Savannah Marie Giammarco	Middletown	16				Previously National American Miss Junior Teen 2012–13; 1st runner-up at Miss Connecticut 2019 competition
2014	Sydney West	Vernon	16				Sister of Logan West, Miss Connecticut Teen USA 2012 and Miss Teen USA 2012
2013	Kendall Leary	Wallingford	17				
2012	Logan West	Southington	18		Miss Teen USA 2012		Sister of Sydney West, Miss Connecticut Teen USA 2014; Previously Miss Connecticut's Outstanding Teen 2010
2011	Samantha Mary Sojka	North Granby	19				Later Miss New Hampshire USA 2026
2010	Alyssa Taglia	Cheshire	16				
2009	Tiffany Ann Teixeira	Bridgeport	17				Later Miss Connecticut USA 2016; Top 10 at Miss USA 2016
2008	Brianne Shannon Hiltz	Shelton	18				
2007	Olga Yurievna Litvinenko	Greenwich	17				Emigrated from Ukraine to the US at age three; Later Miss Connecticut USA 2017
2006	Kristen Heide	Madison	18				
2005	Jennifer Brooks	Bristol	17				Top 10 at Miss Teen America 2003
2004	Christine "Chrissy" Perkins	East Lyme	17				
2003	Nina Musumeci	West Hartford	17				
2002	Ashley Bickford	Hartford	17		Semi-finalist		Triple Crown winner: Previously Miss Rhode Island 2007 and Preliminary Swimsuit Winner and Miss Photogenic at the Miss America 2008 pageant; Later Miss Connecticut USA 2010
2001	Marie-Lynn Piscitelli	North Haven	15				Later Miss Connecticut USA 2012
2000	Lisa DeLeo	Guilford	17				
1999	Bethany McGlynn	Preston	18				
1998	Natalie Perez	Meriden	18				
1997	Alita Hawaah Dawson	Hamden	18				Later Miss Teen All American 1998; Later Miss Connecticut USA 2002; 4th runner up at Miss USA 2002 pageant
1996	Marissa Perez	Meriden	18				Later Miss Connecticut 2001
1995	Tiffany-Anne Kosma	Voluntown					
1994	Stacey Ann Raffone	New Haven	18				
1993	Cynthia Schneck	Wilton	17		Semi-finalist		
1992	Tiffany Selivonchik	New Milford					
1991	Alison Benusis	Ridgefield					Later Miss Connecticut USA 1993
1990	Amy Raboin	Bristol	17				
1989	Suzanne Ianucci	West Haven	18				
1988	Bobbi-Jo Shanahan	East Hartford	17				
1987	Allison Dawn Barbeau-Diorio	Fairfield				Miss Congeniality	Later Miss Connecticut USA 1990
1986	Karen Zawacki	Danbury					
1985	Kristine "Kris" Kunst	Wallingford	16				
1984	Monique Savorey	Monroe	17				
1983	Beth Waldron	Fairfield	14				

^{1} Age at the time of the Miss Teen USA pageant
