= Miss Teen USA 2018 =

36th edition of the Miss Teen USA competition

- Date: May 18, 2018
- Presenters: Cecilio Asuncion; Erin Lim
- Venue: Hirsch Memorial Coliseum, Shreveport, Louisiana
- Broadcaster: Facebook; PlayStation Network; Xbox Live; YouTube
- Entrants: 51
- Placements: 15
- Winner: Hailey Colborn; Kansas

Miss Teen USA 2018, the 36th Miss Teen USA pageant, was held on May 18, 2018, at Hirsch Memorial Coliseum in Shreveport, Louisiana. Sophia Dominguez-Heithoff of Missouri crowned Hailey Colborn of Kansas as her successor at the end of the event. She is the second entrant from Kansas to win the title after Keylee Sue Sanders won Miss Teen USA 1995.

For the first time, the pageant was held concurrently with its sister pageant Miss USA 2018, which was held three days later on May 21, also taking place in Shreveport.

== Results ==
=== Placements ===
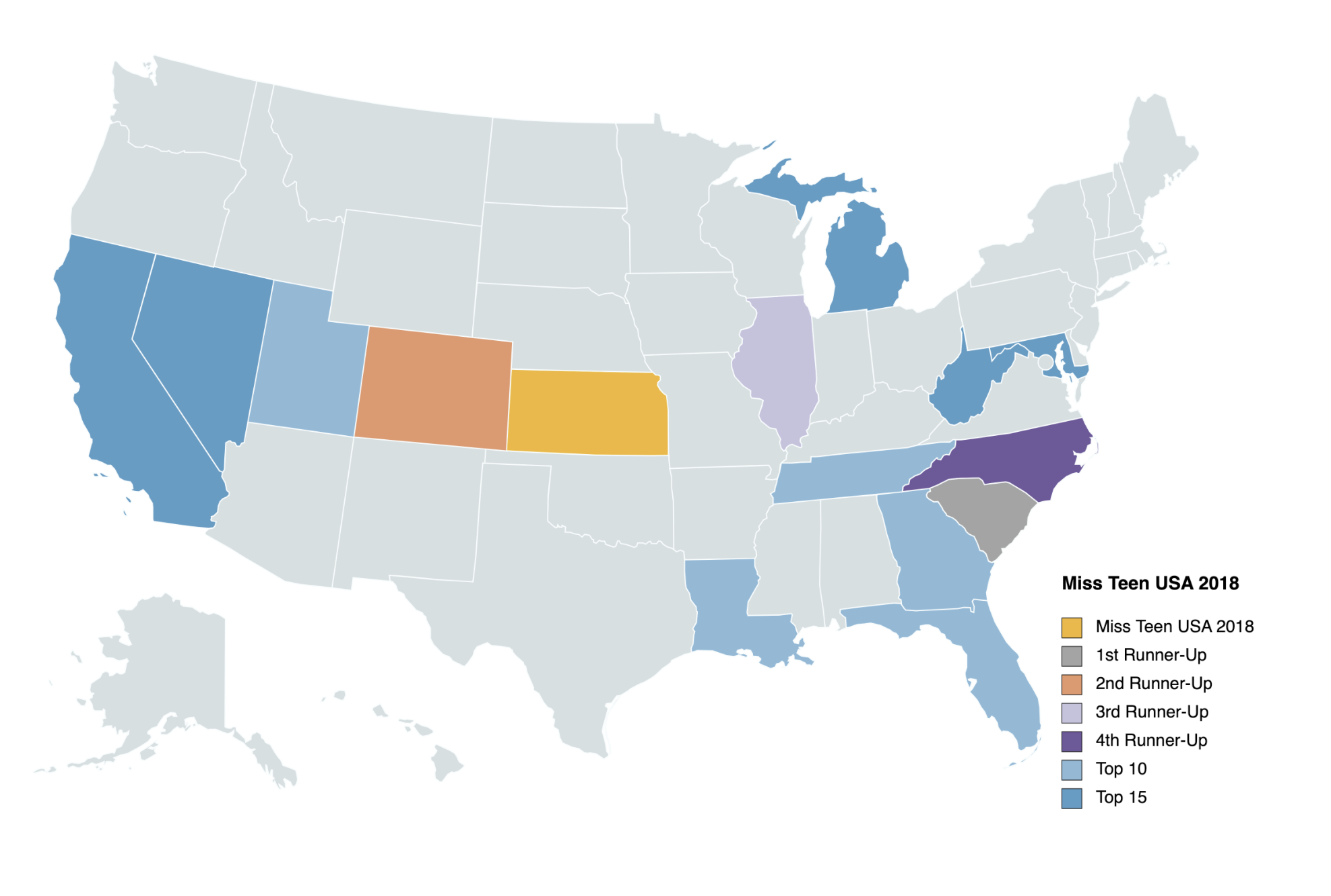
Miss Teen USA 2018 Final Results

Placement	Contestant
Miss Teen USA 2018	Kansas – Hailey Colborn
1st Runner-Up	South Carolina – Kirby Elizabeth Self
2nd Runner-Up	Colorado – Chloe Zambrano
3rd Runner-Up	Illinois – Sydni-Dion Bennett
4th Runner-Up	North Carolina – Kaaviya Sambavisam
Top 10	Florida – Lou Schieffelin; Georgia – Savannah Miles; Louisiana – Lindsey Conque; Tennessee – Sofie Rovenstine; Utah – Madilen Kellogg
Top 15	California – Janeice Love; Maryland – Caleigh Shade; Michigan – Anane Loveday; Nevada – Britney Barnhart; West Virginia – Trinity Tiffany

== Contestants ==
All 51 delegates have been confirmed:

State	Contestant	Age (Note: Ages at the time of the pageant)	Height	Hometown	Placement	Notes
Alabama	Kennedy Cromeens	17	5 ft 8 in (1.73 m)	Birmingham		
Alaska	McKinley Wooten	17	5 ft 7 in (1.70 m)	Wasilla		
Arizona	Macy Deak	16	5 ft 7 in (1.70 m)	Scottsdale		
Arkansas	Mackenzie Hinderberger	19	5 ft 7 in (1.70 m)	Fayetteville		Later Miss Arkansas USA 2023
California	Janeice Love	17	5 ft 8 in (1.73 m)	Barstow	Top 15	
Colorado	Chloe Zambrano	17	5 ft 8 in (1.73 m)	Fruita	2nd runner-up	
Connecticut	Elle Sauli	17	5 ft 1 in (1.55 m)	Newtown		
Delaware	Brynn Close	18	5 ft 8 in (1.73 m)	Middletown		
District of Columbia	Madison Chambers	18	5 ft 9 in (1.75 m)	Washington, D.C.		
Florida	Lou Schieffelin	17	5 ft 10 in (1.78 m)	Winter Park	Top 10	Later Miss Florida USA 2025
Georgia	Savannah Miles	17	5 ft 9 in (1.75 m)	Lawrenceville	Top 10	Later Miss Georgia USA 2025
Hawaii	Kylyn Rapoza	18	5 ft 7 in (1.70 m)	Hilo		
Idaho	Jacy Uhler	18	5 ft 6 in (1.68 m)	Boise		
Illinois	Sydni-Dion Bennett	17	5 ft 7 in (1.70 m)	Chicago	3rd runner-up	First African American Miss Illinois Teen USA; Later Miss Illinois USA 2021 and 3rd runner-up at Miss USA 2021
Indiana	Ella Harrison	17	5 ft 8 in (1.73 m)	New Albany		
Iowa	Isabella Russell	17	5 ft 6 in (1.68 m)	Marshalltown		
Kansas	Hailey Colborn	17	5 ft 4 in (1.63 m)	Wichita	Miss Teen USA 2018	
Kentucky	Jordan Crozier	19	5 ft 4 in (1.63 m)	Somerset		Later top 16 at Miss Kentucky USA 2020
Louisiana	Lindsey Conque	17	5 ft 6 in (1.68 m)	Lafayette	Top 10	
Maine	Erin McPherson	17	5 ft 6 in (1.68 m)	Hartford		
Maryland	Caleigh Shade	18	5 ft 9 in (1.75 m)	Cumberland	Top 15	Later Miss Maryland USA 2022
Massachusetts	Lexi Woloshchuk	18	5 ft 7 in (1.70 m)	Monson		
Michigan	Anane Loveday	16	5 ft 2 in (1.57 m)	Grosse Ile	Top 15	Born in Ethiopia
Minnesota	Peyton Schroeder	18	5 ft 5 in (1.65 m)	Rosemount		
Mississippi	Julieanna Jackson	15	5 ft 7 in (1.70 m)	Mize		
Missouri	Chloe Bartlett	19	5 ft 8 in (1.73 m)	Liberal		
Montana	Elley Munson	17	5 ft 7 in (1.70 m)	Billings		
Nebraska	Michaela Edstrand	17	5 ft 8 in (1.73 m)	Omaha		Later 1st runner-up at Miss Nebraska USA 2023
Nevada	Britney Barnhart	16	5 ft 9 in (1.75 m)	Las Vegas	Top 15	Sister of Miss Nevada Teen USA 2008 Lauren Hudman and daughter of Miss Oklahoma USA 1982 Jill Barnhart.
New Hampshire	Natalie Jenkins	17	5 ft 7 in (1.70 m)	Nashua		
New Jersey	Diana Smerina	16	5 ft 4 in (1.63 m)	Freehold		
New Mexico	Madison Turner	18	5 ft 7 in (1.70 m)	Mosquero		
New York	Saige Guerin	17	5 ft 5 in (1.65 m)	Staten Island		
North Carolina	Kaaviya Sambasivam	18	5 ft 10 in (1.78 m)	Winston-Salem	4th runner-up	Later 1st runner-up at Miss North Carolina USA 2021
North Dakota	Ashlyn Erickson	18	5 ft 8 in (1.73 m)	Fargo		
Ohio	Sofia Durina	18	5 ft 5 in (1.65 m)	Columbiana		
Oklahoma	Zoe Ferraro	17	5 ft 9 in (1.75 m)	Bixby		Later Miss Oklahoma USA 2025
Oregon	Jaycie Forrester	16	5 ft 9 in (1.75 m)	Tualatin		
Pennsylvania	Kailey Grill	18	5 ft 5 in (1.65 m)	Mars		
Rhode Island	Aliyah Moore	18	5 ft 9 in (1.75 m)	Pawtucket		
South Carolina	Kirby Elizabeth Self	18	5 ft 9 in (1.75 m)	Greenwood	1st runner-up	Later Miss South Carolina USA 2023
South Dakota	Shania Knutson	18	5 ft 9 in (1.75 m)	Viborg		Later Miss South Dakota USA 2022
Tennessee	Sofie Rovenstine	19	6 ft 2 in (1.88 m)	Franklin	Top 10	Appeared in the 2018 Victoria's Secret Fashion Show
Texas	Brenna Flynn	18	5 ft 5 in (1.65 m)	Fort Worth		
Utah	Madilen Kellogg	19	5 ft 9 in (1.75 m)	Layton	Top 10	
Vermont	Alexandra Diehl	17	5 ft 7 in (1.70 m)	St. Albans		Previously Miss Vermont's Outstanding Teen 2016
Virginia	Himanvi Preeti Panidepu	18	5 ft 5 in (1.65 m)	Centreville		First East Indian American Miss Virginia Teen-USA; Later Miss Virginia USA 2024
Washington	Summer Keffeler	17	5 ft 7 in (1.70 m)	Monroe		Sister of Stormy Keffeler, original titleholder of Miss Washington USA 2016; Later Miss Nevada USA 2022
West Virginia	Trinity Tiffany	16	5 ft 7 in (1.70 m)	Huntington	Top 15	
Wisconsin	Alexis Maria Loomans	16	5 ft 9 in (1.75 m)	Waunakee		Later Miss Wisconsin USA 2023
Wyoming	Mackenzie Kern	18	5 ft 7 in (1.70 m)	Casper		Later Miss Wyoming USA 2021 and Miss Wyoming 2023

== Judges ==
- Ashley Fox – sports journalist
- Kalani Hilliker – dancer, actress, model, and reality television personality
- Brittney Rogers Collins – reality television personality and Miss Louisiana USA 2003
- Bia Roldan – journalist and news anchor
- Crystle Stewart – television host, model, actress, and Miss USA 2008 from Texas
- Marta Topran – beauty director at Seventeen, Cosmopolitan, and Women's Health
