= Erin Brady =

American television host, model and beauty pageant titleholder

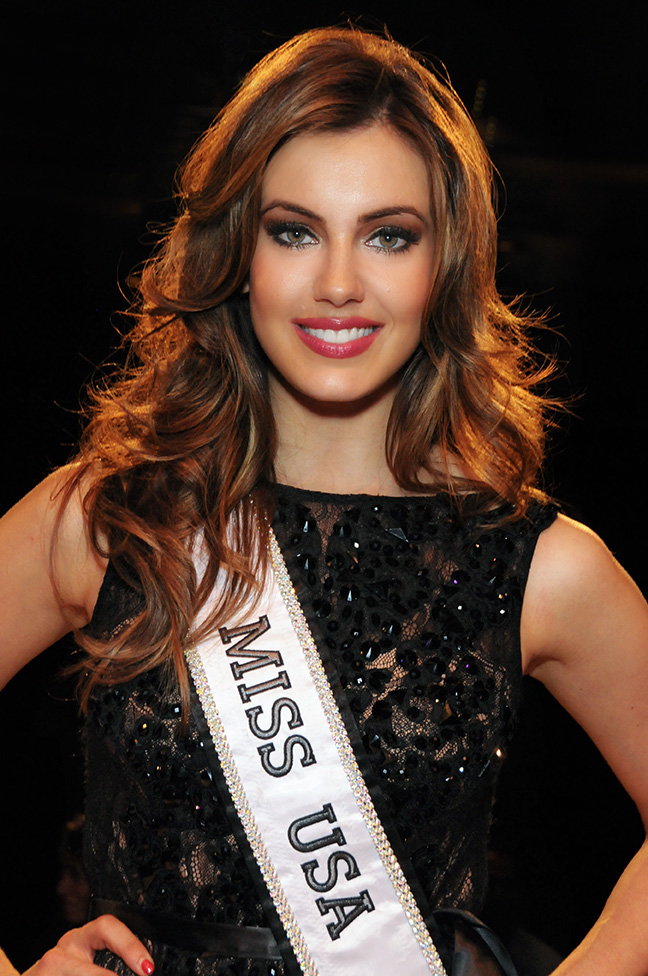
- Erin Brady as Miss USA
- Born: Erin Joyce Brady; November 5, 1987 (age 38); East Hampton, Connecticut, U.S.
- Education: Central Connecticut State University (BS)
- Height: 5 ft (1.5 m)
- Spouses: Tony Capasso (m. 2014; div. 2016) Antonio Colagiovanni (m. 2020)
- Beauty pageant titleholder
- Title: Miss Connecticut USA 2013; Miss USA 2013
- Hair color: Brown
- Eye color: Green
- Major competitions: Miss Connecticut USA 2012 (1st Runner-Up); Miss Connecticut USA 2013 (Winner); Miss USA 2013 (Winner); Miss Universe 2013 (Top 10)

Erin Joyce Brady (born November 5, 1987) is an American TV host, model and beauty pageant titleholder who won Miss USA 2013. She then represented the US at Miss Universe 2013 in Moscow, Russia, on November 9, where she placed in the Top 10. Brady is the first woman from the state of Connecticut ever to be crowned Miss USA.

== Pageants ==
=== Miss Connecticut USA 2013 ===
Brady was crowned Miss Connecticut USA 2013. This was her second attempt at the state title, having placed 1st runner-up the previous year.

=== Miss USA 2013 ===
Brady competed in the Miss USA 2013 competition on June 16, 2013, representing the state of Connecticut. She was crowned the new Miss USA by the outgoing titleholder Nana Meriwether, Miss USA 2012. Brady became the first delegate from the state of Connecticut to be crowned Miss USA.

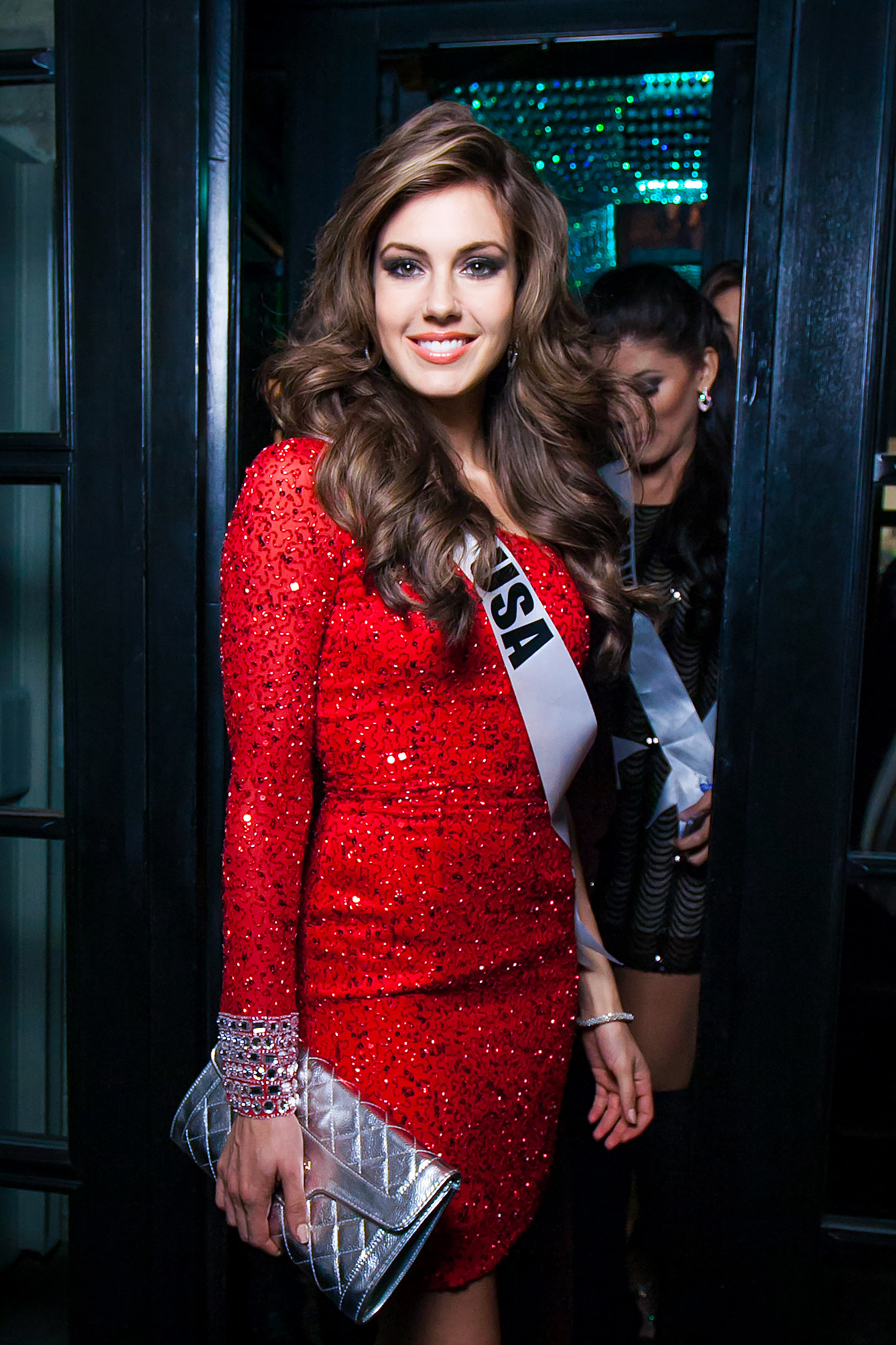
Erin Brady at the Miss Universe 2013 Night Out Party

=== Miss Universe 2013 ===
Erin represented the United States at the 62nd annual Miss Universe competition on November 9, 2013, vying to succeed outgoing titleholder Miss Universe 2012, Olivia Culpo of the U.S. Her national costume was a Transformer. She took 6th place.

== Personal life ==
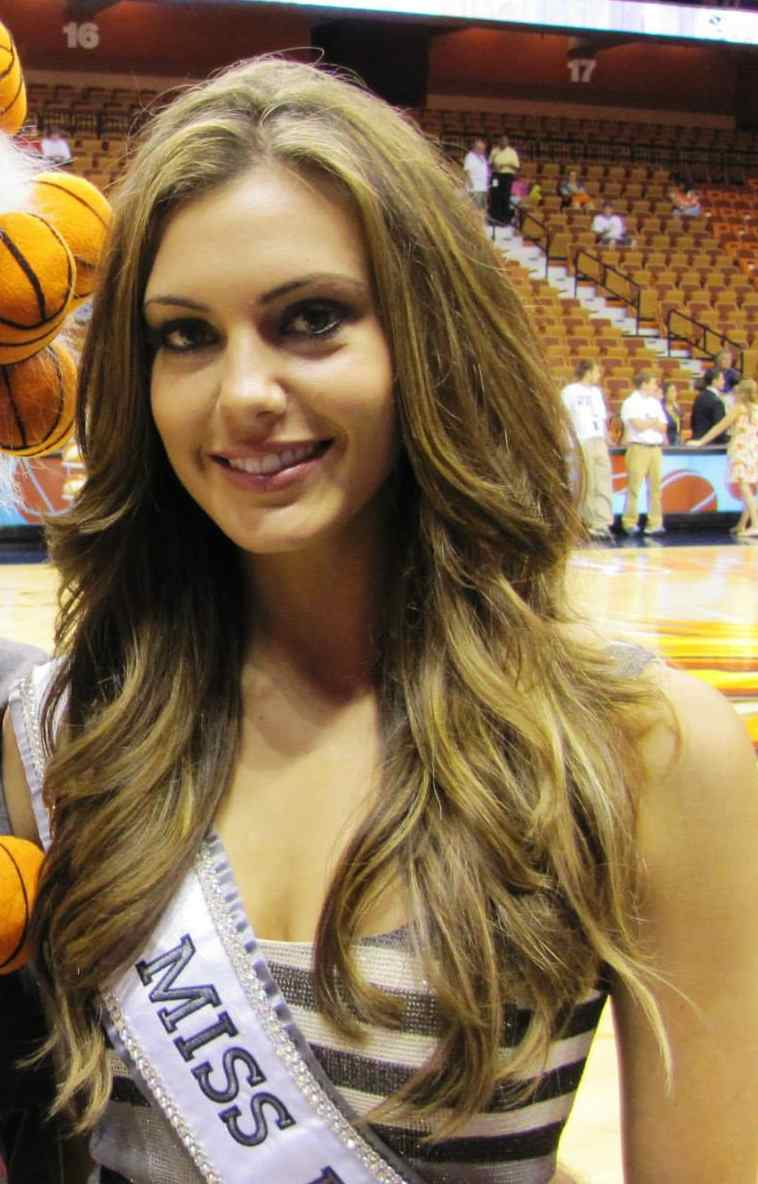
Erin Brady, at 2013 WNBA All-Star game

Brady graduated from Portland High School in 2005, then went on to graduate from Central Connecticut State University in 2010 with a degree in finance and a minor in criminal justice. In 2014, she gave the address at CCSU's undergraduate commencement. She is a financial accountant for Prudential Retirement in Hartford, Connecticut.

She has helped with the Ferrari and Friends Concorso, which works closely with the Children's Medical Hospital and the "Make-A-Wish Foundation"; Susan G. Komen, Walk for The Cure and Habitat for Humanity as her charities of choice. It is her goal to be an advocate for children of alcohol addicts, a decision influenced by her own childhood.

In August 2013, she was inducted in the New York City's Ride of Fame.

Brady married Tony Capasso on December 13, 2014. The couple were scheduled to marry on November 9, 2013, the same day she competed in the Miss Universe pageant in Moscow. In accordance with the Miss USA rules, Brady and Capasso had to wait until Brady had completed her year as the titleholder. In 2020, Brady married Nick Colagiovanni. Her cousins are Marc and Dean.

Awards and achievements
Preceded by Nana Meriwether	Miss USA; 2013	Succeeded by Nia Sanchez
Preceded by Marie-Lynn Piscitelli	Miss Connecticut USA; 2013	Succeeded by Desirée Pérez
Preceded by The Mowgli's	Ride of Fame; 2013	Succeeded by Mariano Rivera
