= CitiApartments =

American real estate company

CitiApartments, Inc.
- Type: privately held corporation
- Industry: real estate
- Founded: 1940s
- Founder: Frank Lembi
- Headquarters: San Francisco, California, San Francisco, CA, USA
- Key people: Frank Lembi, Founder and Chairman; Walter Lembi (deceased); David Raynal, managing partner and Chief Operating Officer;
- Services: apartment owner and manager
- Revenue: $80 million / yr
- Parent: Skyline Realty, Inc.

CitiApartments was one of the largest real estate companies in San Francisco, California, which at its peak owned and managed more than 300 buildings directly and through a number of affiliates. In recent years the companies suffered a financial downturn, and have been the subject of intense criticism and litigation for allegedly illegal business practices as a residential landlord.

== Corporate structure and holdings ==
CitiApartments, Inc. is a subsidiary of Skyline Realty, Inc., and also operates buildings owned by various limited liability companies, all of which are in turn owned by founder Frank Lembi and various members of his family. Among the most prominent of these are Trophy Properties and Ritz Apartments.

As of 2006 and 2007 CitiApartments and its affiliates owned 307 apartment buildings with a total of more than 6,500 apartment units housing more than 7,000 residents, making it the second-largest owner of residential rental property in San Francisco at the time.

It also owned five boutique hotels, two office buildings, a real estate brokerage, a mortgage brokerage, and a property management firm.

== History ==
=== Origins ===
Frank Lembi, originally a pharmacist, became a real estate broker after returning from military service in 1946. Shortly after, he formed Skyline Realty as a brokerage. He bought the business outright upon his business partner's death in 1968. Lembi's empire today includes: FirstApartments (created to substitute CitiApartments), Personality Hotels, CitiSuites, Hotel Diva.

=== Recent business developments ===
Beginning in the early 1990s Skyline Realty shifted its focus from brokering real estate to buying and managing apartments. CitiApartments has taken a buy and hold approach to its investments, making heavily leveraged purchases of mid-sized older buildings in nearly every neighborhood of San Francisco but mostly in the Tenderloin and Nob Hill. Because most of the city's housing stock comprises smaller buildings, with only several large complexes, the company achieved a dominant position within its market.

=== A family business ===
Founder Frank Lembi's son, Walter Lembi, was a significant owner until his death in 2010. Grandson Taylor Lembi also owns two apartment buildings and is part of the business. David Raynal, COO, is Frank Lembi's nephew. In various combinations and through affiliated companies they own the buildings managed by CitiApartments.

== Controversy ==
=== Lawsuits ===
On August 16, 2006, the Office of the City Attorney of San Francisco filed a lawsuit against CitiApartments and related companies and individuals claiming an "egregious pattern of illegal business practices" that amounted to a "panoply of lawlessness, intimidation tactics, [and] retaliation against residents." Among the city's claims are: intimidating tenants into leaving rent controlled units, unannounced visits by armed guards, illegally entering units, changing locks, shutting off utilities, retaliating against tenants who refused buy-outs, remodeling units without necessary permits or inspections, and illegally renting out residential units as hotel rooms and executive suites.

In April, 2006, 23 tenants filed a private lawsuit against the companies. Among the claims are intimidation of tenants by armed guards, harassment and threats, coercive interrogation sessions to pressure tenants into signing agreements, illegal construction intended to harass tenants, and tenant lockouts, all intended to force below-market rent controlled tenants to leave so the company could renovate and re-rent at a higher rate.

In July, 2009 several additional lawsuits were filed against CitiApartments Inc. and at least 56 related entities, including one class action suit, by former tenants alleging a deliberate pattern of illegally withholding and delaying return of rental deposits. CitiApartments was sanctioned more than $30,000 in one instance, and $50,000 in another, for what a judge described as "willful" failure to comply with document discovery requests.

=== Eliminating competition ===
CitiApartments often paid as much as 50% more for a building than its value to the rest of the market, and as a result may have raised overall market prices by 5-10%. This drove away competition from weaker and more cash-sensitive property investors. Starting in late 2006 it bought nearly all of the multi-unit apartments sold in the city as they became available. Critics claimed that the only reason CitiApartments could afford the premium was that it made more money on buildings than companies that operate within the limits of the law, or that it made unrealistically optimistic promises to its lenders about its ability to force rent-controlled tenants out of their apartments.

=== Shaky finances ===
CitiApartments and its sister companies bought buildings on credit from outside investors, with down payments as low as 5% of the total purchase price (as opposed to 30-40%, which is more common for comparable commercial real estate purchases). Because of the high prices paid for buildings, and the high amount financed, the buildings have negative cash flow and cannot support their mortgage. The company's lenders typically provided higher than usual loan reserves that would give CitiApartments sufficient money to make interest payments while also paying off or evicting existing tenants, based on a financial model by which it would replace at least 75% of the tenants within two years.

Critics long complained that in the event of a market downturn or other unexpected event, CitiApartments was in danger of defaulting on its mortgages and would have to sell them at distressed prices or in foreclosure, which would have a ripple effect that depresses commercial real estate throughout San Francisco. Such predictions came to pass in January, 2009, when the parent company had to assign 51 of its (then) 307 properties to one lender, UBS AG, in lieu of foreclosure, because they collectively had a negative cash flow of approximately $3 million per month.

In 2009, the Lembi Group was in financial distress due to a combination of softening rents due to the late 2000s recession (which hurt the effectiveness of its strategy of replacing existing rent-control tenants by attrition and eviction), inability to renew or refinance existing loans due to the 2008 financial crisis, and a resulting decrease in value and saleability of commercial properties that made it impossible to re-sell buildings to avoid foreclosure. Given the high financial leverage and the group's having initially paid above-market prices, many of their loans were underwater. As of that time the company was attempting to renegotiate approximately $1 billion in loans, and in possible default on another $164 million loan. By the summer of 2009 the company had transferred 51 properties to one lender in lieu of foreclosure, and was in foreclosure proceedings on more than 60 others.

On Oct. 29, 2009 the San Francisco Chronicle published a story stating the Clark County, Nev., district attorney's office, has "a warrant out for Walter Lembi, managing director of the financially troubled Lembi Group, for allegedly passing $298,500 worth of bad checks earlier this year at Caesar's Palace in Las Vegas."

=== Past controversies ===
Frank Lembi was Chairman of Continental Savings of America, a savings and loan institution that was taken over by the Office of Thrift Supervision to prevent insolvency due to bad high-risk real estate loans in the savings and loan crisis of the 1980s. Frank's son Walter was President starting in 1982 or 1983. He and son Walter were named in numerous lawsuits related to that company.

=== CitiApartments response ===
To promote its position as a caretaker of San Francisco's older housing stock, CitiApartments had co-hosted various housing-related and low-income charities and causes, and provided one nearly free studio apartment to a needy family. It disseminated numerous press releases on the subject since the inception of the lawsuits and adopted the slogan "Restoring San Francisco's Neighborhoods."

CitiApartments through interviews and press releases categorically denied all claims, and rejected all criticism made against it with respect to violating its tenants rights. It described itself as an upstanding property manager, and claimed that any disputes with tenants were groundless, minor, or normal and incidental for a landlord of its size.

=== Bankruptcy ===
In February 2020, Four real estate companies owned by San Francisco's largest landlord, the Lembi Group, filed a bankruptcy court in California for Chapter 11 protection. The companies are members of the CitiApartments Inc, Lembi Group's biggest shareholder of apartments in San Francisco. The four companies put 16 residential assets together, which became leverage for a $132.4 million loan.
