= Miss Connecticut's Teen =

- Formation: 2005
- Type: Beauty pageant
- Headquarters: Bristol
- Location: Connecticut
- Members: Miss America's Teen
- Official language: English
- Key people: Ashley Dalton (Executive Director)
- Website: Official website

The Miss Connecticut's Teen competition is the pageant that selects the representative for the U.S. state of Connecticut in the Miss America's Teen pageant.

Mia Mathewson of Milford was crowned Miss Connecticut's Teen on June 27, 2026, at the Rockwell Theater at the Bristol Arts and Innovation Magnet School (BAIMS) in Bristol, Connecticut. She competed for the title of Miss America's Teen 2027 on September 5, 2026, at the Kravis Center for the Performing Arts in West Palm Beach, Florida.

In January 2023, the official name of the pageant was changed from Miss Connecticut's Outstanding Teen, to Miss Connecticut's Teen, in accordance with the national pageant.

== Results summary ==
The results of Miss Connecticut's Outstanding Teen as they participated in the national Miss America's Outstanding Teen competition. The year in parentheses indicates the year of the Miss America's Outstanding Teen competition the award/placement was earned.

=== Placements ===
- 1st runners-up: Jainé Coann Truex LeFebvre (2013)

=== Awards ===
==== Preliminary awards ====
- Preliminary Evening Wear/On-Stage Question: Jainé Coann Truex LeFebvre (2013), Peyton Troth (2023)

==== Non-finalist awards ====
- Non-finalist Evening Wear/On-Stage Question: Logan West (2011)

==== Other awards ====
- JoAnna Adkisson Community Service Award: Acacia Courtney (2010)
- Teens in Action Finalist: Peyton Troth (2023)
- Top 3 Community Service Award: Cynthia Moura Dias (2014)
- Top 5 Interview Award: Jainé Coann Truex LeFebvre (2013)
- Top 10 Community Service Award: Jainé Coann Truex LeFebvre (2013)

== Winners ==
- Declared as Winner
- Ended as a runner-up
- Ended as a finalist or semi-finalist

Year	Name	Hometown	Age	Local title	Talent	Placement at MAO Teen	Special scholarships at MAO Teen	Notes
2026	Mia Mathewson	Milford	16	Miss Milford’s Teen	Lyrical Dance			
2025	Haylee Patton	Bristol	15	Miss Bristol's Teen	Jazz Dance			Cousin of Miss Connecticut's Teen 2022 and 2024, Peyton Troth and Camryn Patton.
2024	Camryn Patton	Bristol	17	Miss Constitution's Teen	Lyrical Dance			Cousin of Miss Connecticut’s Teen 2023 and 2025, Peyton Troth and Haylee Patton.
2023	Emily Anastasio	Meriden	18	Miss Bristol's Teen	Tap Dance			
2022	Peyton Troth	Bristol	14	Miss Hartford County's Outstanding Teen	Rhythmic Tap Dance, "Belle"		Teens in Action Finalist Preliminary Evening Gown/OSQ Award	Later Miss Massachusetts Teen Volunteer 2026; Top 10 at Miss Teen Volunteer America 2027; Cousin of Miss Connecticut’s Teen 2024 and 2026, Camryn and Haylee Patton
2021	Aicha Diallo	West Haven	17	Miss Greater Hamden's Outstanding Teen	Dance, "Brotsjor"			
2019-20	Lindiana Frangu	Woodbury	15	Miss Bristol's Outstanding Teen	Rhythmic Tap Dance, "Cold Hearted"			
2018	Morgan Mancini	Wolcott	16	Miss Farmingbury's Outstanding Teen	Tap Dance, "Happy"			
2017	Brooke Cyr	Waterbury	15	Miss Naugatuck Valley's Outstanding Teen	Lyrical Acrobatic Dance			3rd runner-up at Miss Connecticut 2023 and 2025
2016	Samantha Anderson	Wolcott	17	Miss Constitution's Outstanding Teen	Dance			
2015	Sapna Raghavan	Ellington	17	Miss Greater Rockville's Outstanding Teen	Bollywood Dance			Later Miss Connecticut 2021
2014	Cynthia Dias	Wolcott	14	Miss Wolcott's Outstanding Teen	Lyrical Dance			Later Miss Connecticut USA 2022, Top 12 at Miss USA 2022 & Fan Vote Winner
2013	Tiana Dyson	New Haven	15	Miss Elm City's Outstanding Teen	Dance			
2012	Jainé Coann Truex LeFebvre	Glastonbury	16	Miss Mountain Laurel's Outstanding Teen	Vocal	1st runner-up	Preliminary Evening Wear/OSQ Award Top 5 Interview Award Top 10 Community Service Award	
2011	Nicole Nemense	Watertown	15	Miss Westbury's Outstanding Teen	Tap Dance			
2010	Logan West	Southington	16	Miss Southington's Outstanding Teen			Non-finalist Evening Wear/OSQ Award	Later Miss Connecticut Teen USA 2012 Later Miss Teen USA 2012
2009	Acacia Courtney	Hamden	16	Miss Nutmeg's Outstanding Teen	Ballet en Pointe		Community Service Award	Later Miss Connecticut 2014; Top 16 at Miss America 2015 pageant Currently a TV reporter and paddock analyst for Gulfstream Park Later Miss Connecticut USA 2019
2008	Rachael Ramonas	Wolcott	16	Miss Wolcott's Outstanding Teen	Lyrical Dance, "Brave"			Stripped of title after police were called to her party at Ramonas' parents' home with numerous underage drinkers
2007	Karen Link	Terryville		Miss Bristol's Outstanding Teen	Spanish-influenced Tap Dance			Former NFL cheerleader and cheer captain for the New England Patriots
2006	Melanie Sanches	Prospect	16		Character Tap Dance			Former NFL cheerleader for the New England Patriots
2005	Sarah Lord	Norwich	17		Musical Theater Dance			
