= Logan West =

American beauty queen (born 1994)

- Born: June 20, 1994 (age 32); Southington, Connecticut, U.S.
- Height: 5 ft 7 in (1.70 m)
- Beauty pageant titleholder
- Title: Miss Connecticut's Outstanding Teen 2010; Miss Connecticut Teen USA 2012; Miss Teen USA 2012
- Hair color: Brown
- Eye color: Brown
- Major competitions: Miss America's Outstanding Teen 2010 (Unplaced); Miss Teen USA 2012 (Winner)

Logan West (born June 20, 1994) is an American beauty queen who competed and won Miss Connecticut Teen USA 2012, and was later crowned Miss Teen USA 2012. West was the first contestant from the state of Connecticut to win the title.

== Pageantry ==
Logan West held the Miss Connecticut's Outstanding Teen 2010 title and competed in Miss America's Outstanding Teen 2010. She did not place, but she did win an evening gown award.

Logan West won the Miss Connecticut Teen USA 2012 pageant in late 2011. This was her first attempt at the title.

Logan West won the Miss Teen USA 2012 pageant on July 28, 2012, becoming the first contestant from the state of Connecticut to win the Miss Teen USA title. West told media that she had suffered from bullying at school during seventh grade. She was told by a classmate that she "didn't act her skin color" and was "tortured and humiliated for six months," until she started an anti-bullying program and also got the girl who had bullied her removed from her school. West's anti-bullying program is now used in most schools in the state of Connecticut's school-system.

Awards and achievements
Preceded by (Texas) Danielle Doty	Miss Teen USA; 2012	Succeeded by (California) Cassidy Wolf
Preceded by Samantha Sojka	Miss Connecticut Teen USA; 2012	Succeeded by Kendall Leary
Preceded by Acacia Courtney	Miss Connecticut's Outstanding Teen; 2010	Succeeded by Nicole Nemense
