= Connecticut Department of Developmental Services =

State agency of Connecticut, United States

Agency overview
- Formed: 1975
- Jurisdiction: Government of Connecticut
- Headquarters: 460 Capitol Avenue Hartford, CT 06106
- Minister responsible: Elisa Velardo
- Website: http://www.ct.gov/dds/site/default.asp

The Connecticut Department of Developmental Services (DDS) is a state agency of Connecticut providing services to individuals with developmental disabilities and their families. Its headquarters are in Hartford. According to its official Twitter description, "CT DDS serves more than 20,000 individuals [with] intellectual disability and their families, including 4,000 infants and toddlers in the Birth to Three System."

In 2012, $30 million was cut from the DDS budget, and only $5 million was added back in 2014.

== History ==
The Department's roots are in the "Office of Mental Retardation," established in 1959 as part of the Department of Health. In 1975, it was established as the "Department of Mental Retardation" (DMR) in order to "administer the Training Schools, all other regional centers, and state operated community and residential facilities for the diagnosis, care and training of mentally challenged individuals." The Department changed its name to DDS in 2007.

== Commissioners ==
- Morna A. Murray (2015–Present)
- Terrence Macy (2011–2015)
- Peter H. O'Meara (1996–2011)
- Linda Goldfarb (Acting, 1995)
- Toni Richardson (1990-1994)
- Brian R. Lensink (1985-1989)
- Gareth D. Thorne (1975-1984)
