= Alexia Robinson =

Alexia Robinson may refer to:

- Alexia Robinson (Miss United States)
- Alexia Robinson (actress), American actress
