= Elms College =

Catholic college in Chicopee, Massachusetts, US

College of Our Lady of the Elms
- Latin: Collegium Dominae Nostrae In Ulmis
- Motto: Viam Veritatis Elegi
- Motto in English: "I Have Chosen the Way of Truth"
- Type: Private college
- Established: 1928
- Religious affiliation: Roman Catholic (Sisters of St. Joseph)
- Academic affiliations: Cooperating Colleges of Greater Springfield
- Endowment: US$12 million
- President: Harry Dumay
- Faculty: 52 full-time, 7 part-time
- Students: 1,268 (fall 2024)
- Undergraduates: 1,002 (fall 2024)
- Postgraduates: 266 (fall 2024)
- Location: Chicopee, Massachusetts, U.S. 42°8′32.15″N 72°36′5.00″W
- Campus: 22 acres (8.9 ha)
- Colors: Green, gold, white
- Nickname: Blazers
- Sporting affiliations: NCAA Division III
- Website: elms.edu

The College of Our Lady of the Elms, often called Elms College, is a private Catholic college in Chicopee, Massachusetts, United States.

== History ==
The Sisters of St. Joseph and the Diocese of Springfield co-founded Elms College as a preparatory academy for women in Pittsfield, Massachusetts, the Academy of Our Lady of the Elms, in 1897. In 1899, Rev. John McCoy and Bishop Thomas Beaven of the Springfield diocese purchased property in Chicopee and it became St. Joseph's Normal College.

In 1927, the Sisters of Saint Joseph petitioned the Commonwealth of Massachusetts to charter the school as a women's liberal arts college with a specialization in education, the charter was approved in 1928, and the name was changed to the College of Our Lady of the Elms with Rev. Thomas Michael O'Leary as the first president. Through the efforts of the Sisters of St. Joseph and the Springfield diocesan clergy, the curriculum was expanded through the 1940s and 1950s, and in 1953, an evening program was established.

To meet the needs of the surrounding community, Elms developed undergraduate programs in nursing, business management, and communication sciences and disorders during the 1960s and 1970s. In the late 1980s, Weekend College, paralegal studies and legal studies, and a Master of Arts degree program in teaching were instituted.

On October 7, 1997, the Elms College board of trustees voted 23–5 to begin admitting men, starting with the 1998–1999 school year.

== Campus ==
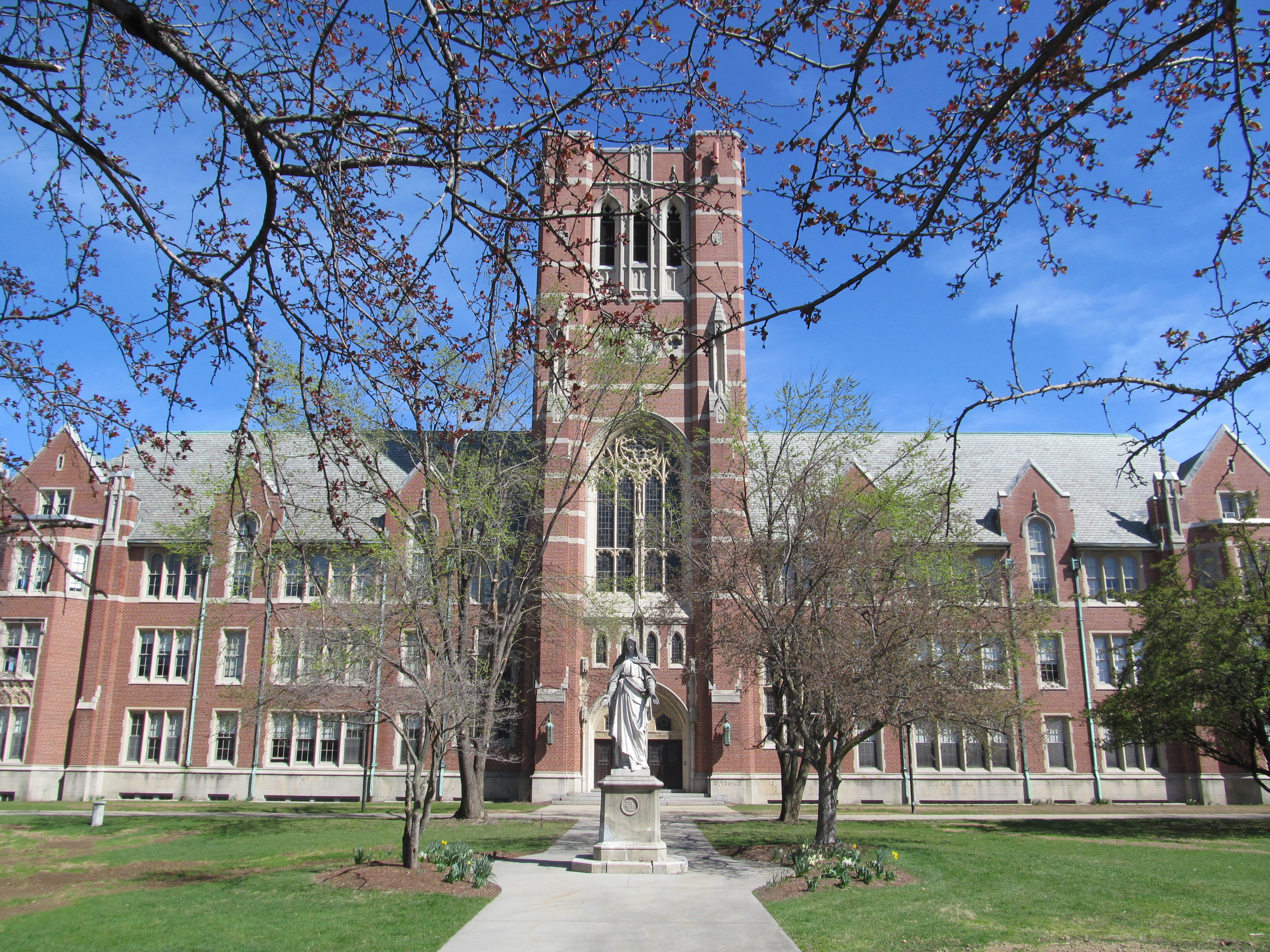
Berchmans Hall

The campus is about two miles north of Metro Center, Springfield, Massachusetts. It is focused on the Keating Quadrangle, which lies at its center, and has 14 buildings. In 2014, Elms College completed construction on the Center for Natural and Health Sciences, its first academic building in more than 30 years.

== Academics ==
Elms offers thirty-three academic majors to 814 full-time undergraduate students, and it employs 67 full-time faculty members.

Academically, the college is divided into the division of business, division of communication sciences and disorders, division of education, division of humanities and fine arts, division of natural sciences, mathematics and technology, and division of social sciences.

In 2013, the division of nursing became the school of nursing. On August 9 2023, Julie Beck was announced as the new dean of the School of Nursing (SON).

== Student body ==
In 2020 the school had about 1,100 students at the undergraduate level, with about 40% eligible for Pell grants. Fred Thys of WBUR wrote that year that "Elms caters to many students who are the first in their family to go to college."

== Athletics ==
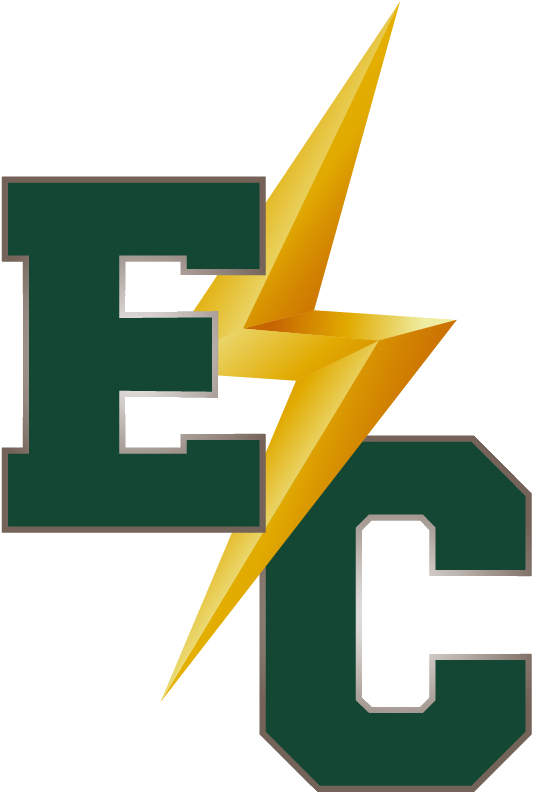
Elms Blazers logo

The Elms College teams participate at the Division III level of the National Collegiate Athletic Association. The team colors are green, gold, and white. The Elms athletic teams competes in the Great Northeast Athletic Conference and are known as the Blazers.

Men's sports	Women's sports
Baseball	Basketball
Basketball	Cross Country
Cross Country	Field hockey
Golf	Lacrosse
Lacrosse	Soccer
Soccer	Softball
Swimming	Swimming
Volleyball	Volleyball

=== Facilities ===
The majority of athletics at Elms College are based out of The Maguire Center, which features a physical therapy and training center, gym and weight room, six-lane swimming pool (Natatorium), 100-meter track, and the Picknelly Arena basketball court. In June of 2007, the college announced an athletic fields renovation project involving the soccer specific Leary Field being transformed into a multi-use artificial surface field and the construction of a new NCAA-compliant softball field. The baseball team travels to Mackenzie Stadium in Holyoke, Mass.

==== Cheryl R. Condon Field ====
The new softball field was built in for the 2008 season, it featured newly-added covered dugouts and a batting cage and extended the homerun wall a few feet. The field was dedicated to longtime winningest coach Cheryl R. Condon on April 23 2008.

== Notable people ==
=== Alumni ===
- Shirley Arriaga, Massachusetts politician of the Massachusetts House of Representatives
- Joan Hartley, Connecticut politician, Deputy President Pro Tempore of the Connecticut State Senate
- Barbara E. McGann, was one of the first women to achieve two-star rank in the United States Navy
- Andromeda Peters, crowned Miss United States 2018

=== Faculty ===
- Paul Jenkins, professor of poetry
- Thomas Michael O'Leary, co-founder and first president of Elms College
- John Elder Robison, adjunct professor, autistic author of two books, brother of Augusten Burroughs
- Christopher Joseph Weldon, president of Elms College from 1958 to 1977
