= Miss USA 2019 =

68th Miss USA pageant

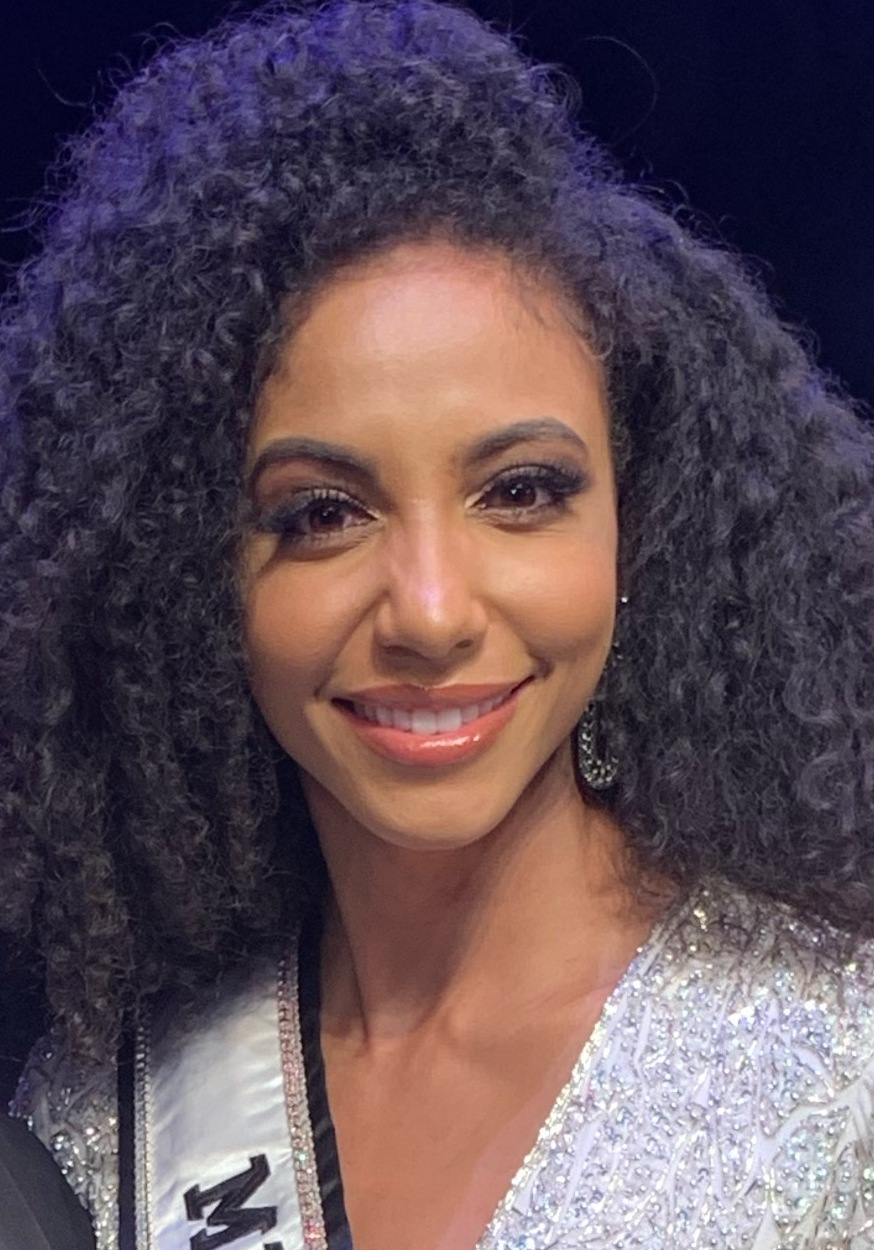
- Cheslie Kryst
- Date: May 2, 2019
- Presenters: Nick Lachey; Vanessa Lachey; Lu Sierra
- Entertainment: T-Pain; Nick Lachey
- Venue: Grand Sierra Resort, Reno, Nevada
- Broadcaster: Fox(KRXI-TV); Azteca
- Entrants: 51
- Placements: 15
- Winner: Cheslie Kryst; North Carolina
- Congeniality: Tate Fritchley, Indiana

Miss USA 2019 was the 68th Miss USA pageant, held at the Grand Sierra Resort in Reno, Nevada on May 2, 2019. The 2019 competition served as the second consecutive time that the pageant has been held concurrently with the Miss Teen USA competition. This was also the final pageant where it was televised on Fox.

The contest was won by Cheslie Kryst of North Carolina, who was crowned by Sarah Rose Summers of Nebraska. This was North Carolina's third time winning the Miss USA title, and its first in ten years. Kryst was the first non-consecutive African American to win the title and the third one in four years. Kryst represented the United States at Miss Universe 2019, placing in the top ten.

Contestants from fifty states and the District of Columbia competed in this edition. Nick Lachey and Vanessa Lachey served as hosts, while Lu Sierra served as commentator. T-Pain and Nick Lachey performed in this edition.

== Background ==
=== Location and date ===
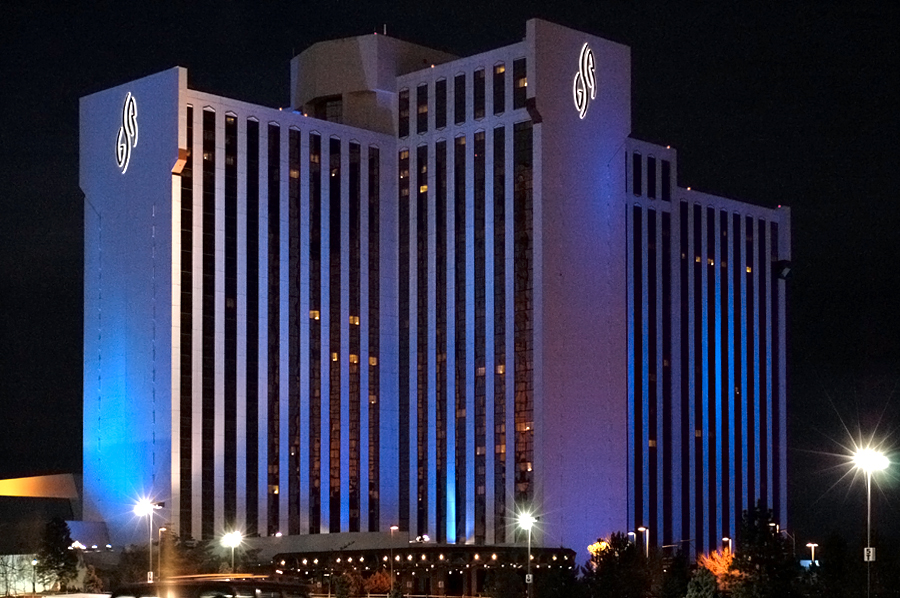
Grand Sierra Resort in Reno, Nevada, the host venue of the Miss USA 2019 competition.

On March 28, 2019, the Miss Universe Organization (MUO) confirmed that the pageant would be held on May 2 at the Grand Sierra Resort in Reno, Nevada. Shortly afterwards, it was confirmed that Miss USA 2018 hosts Nick Lachey and Vanessa Lachey would be returning to host the 2019 competition.

Following the announcement of Reno being selected as the competition's host city, it emerged that the MUO were originally planning on holding the competition in Honolulu, Hawaii. The plan was rejected by Hawaiian officials and relocated to Reno by the MUO after the Hawaii Tourism Authority (HTA) reported that they would be unable to secure the funds to host the competition that the MUO had requested, adding that they would be interested in hosting in the future.

=== Selection of participants ===
Delegates from 50 states and the District of Columbia were selected in state pageants that began in August 2018 and ended in January 2019. The first state pageant was Alaska, held on August 4, 2018, and the final pageants were California, Kentucky and New Mexico, both held on January 27, 2019. Seven of them were former Miss Teen USA state winners, three of them were former Miss America state winners and two of them were former Miss America's Outstanding Teen state winners. (Note: Savannah Skidmore, the reigning Miss Arkansas USA, previously inherited the Miss Arkansas title after Savvy Shields won Miss America 2017 but never competed in Miss America.)

== Results ==
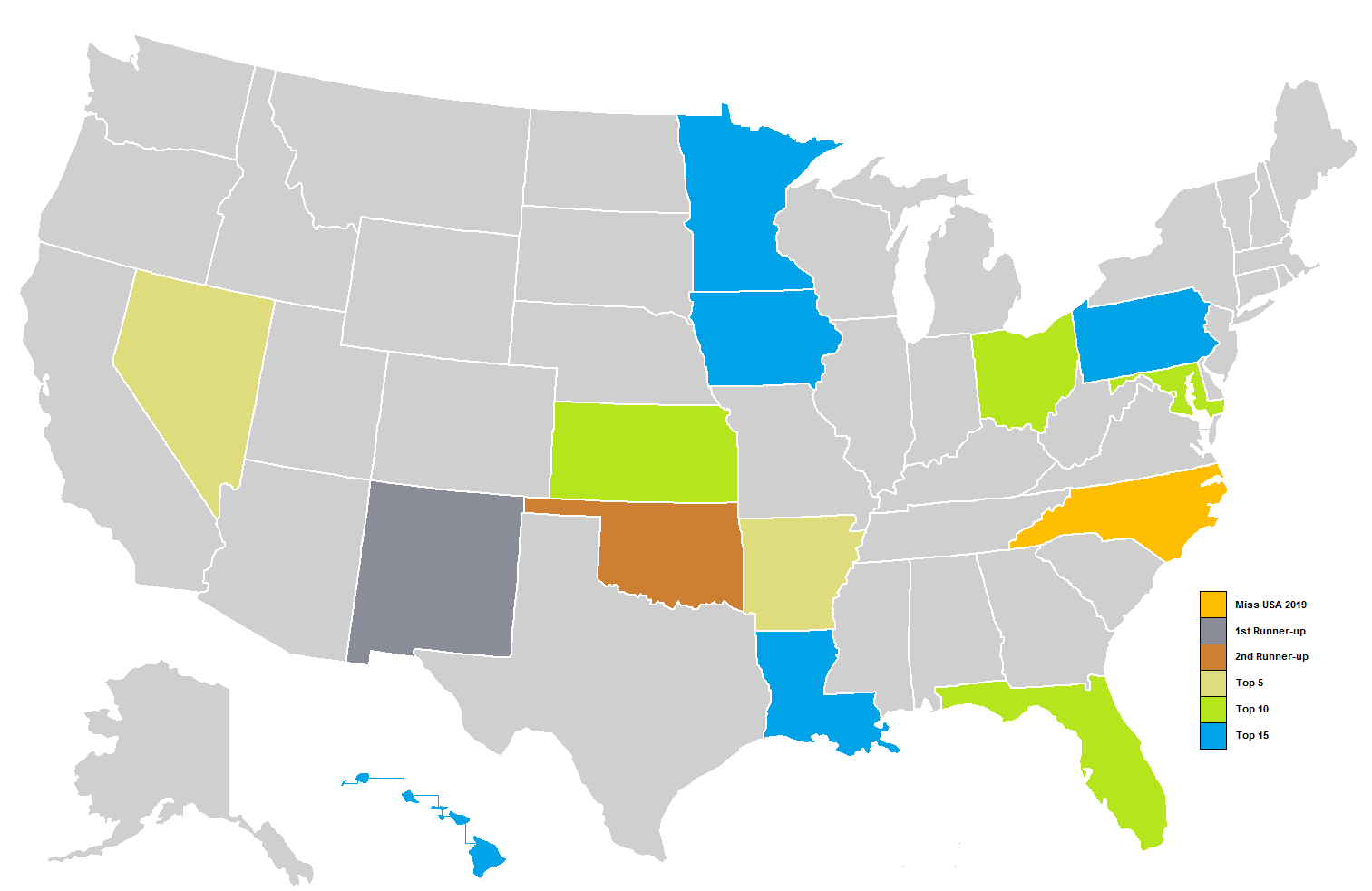
Miss USA 2019 results.

=== Placements ===
Placement	Contestant
Miss USA 2019	North Carolina – Cheslie Kryst
1st runner-up	New Mexico – Alejandra Gonzalez
2nd runner-up	Oklahoma – Triana Browne
Top 5	Arkansas – Savannah Skidmore; Nevada – Tianna Tuamoheloa
Top 10	District of Columbia – Cordelia Cranshaw; Florida – Nicolette Jennings; Kansas – Alyssa Klinzing; Maryland – Mariela Pepin; Ohio – Alice Magoto
Top 15	Hawaii – Lacie Choy; Iowa – Baylee Drezek; Louisiana – Victoria Paul; Minnesota – Catherine Stanley; Pennsylvania – Kailyn Marie Perez

=== Special awards ===
Award	Contestant
Miss Congeniality	Indiana – Tate Fritchley

== Pageant ==
=== Format ===
Same as the previous year, during the final competition, the results of the preliminary competition — which consisted of the swimsuit competition, the evening gown competition, and the closed-door interview determined the fifteen semi-finalists who advanced at the first cut. The fifteen semi-finalists competed in the swimsuit competition, while 10 competed in the evening gown competition. Five finalists were chosen to competed in a question round regarding current affairs, while three finalists competed in the final question round and final walk.

=== Judges ===
- Nicole Feld – businesswoman, producer, and vice president for Feld Entertainment, Inc.
- Kim Kaupe – businesswoman and co-founder of The Superfan Company
- Demi-Leigh Nel-Peters – Miss Universe 2017 from South Africa
- Ukonwa Ojo – marketing executive for CoverGirl, Rimmel, and Vera Wang
- Amy Palmer – journalist and media entrepreneur
- Denise Quiñones – Miss Universe 2001 from Puerto Rico
- Hillary Schieve – politician and Mayor of Reno, Nevada
- Patricia Southall – philanthropist and Miss Virginia USA 1994

== Contestants ==
Fifty-one contestants competed for the title.

State/district	Contestant	Age (Note: Ages at the time of the pageant)	Hometown	Notes
Alabama	Hannah McMurphy	21	Tuscaloosa	
Alaska	JoEllen Walters	25	Eagle River	
Arizona	Savannah Wix	23	Paradise Valley	Previously Miss Arizona Teen USA 2014
Arkansas	Savannah Skidmore	24	Calico Rock	Previously Miss Arkansas 2016
California	Erica Dann	27	San Francisco	
Colorado	Madison Dorenkamp	26	Lamar	
Connecticut	Acacia Courtney	26	Hamden	Previously Miss Connecticut's Outstanding Teen 2009; Previously Miss Connecticut 2014
Delaware	Jolisa Copeman	24	Middletown	
District of Columbia	Cordelia Cranshaw	26	Washington, D.C.	
Florida	Nicolette Jennings	22	Clearwater	
Georgia	Katerina Rozmajzl	21	Atlanta	
Hawaii	Lacie Choy	20	Honolulu	
Idaho	Shelby Brown	25	Boise	
Illinois	Alexandra Plotz	24	Geneva	Previously Miss Illinois Teen USA 2012; Later Miss Illinois World 2019
Indiana	Tate Fritchley	21	Evansville	
Iowa	Baylee Drezek	21	Davenport	
Kansas	Alyssa Klinzing	21	Olathe	Previously Miss Kansas Teen USA 2013; Later Miss California Earth USA 2021
Kentucky	Jordan Weiter	22	Louisville	
Louisiana	Victoria Paul	26	Alexandria	Contestant on season 24 of The Bachelor and season 7 of Bachelor in Paradise
Maine	Lexie Elston	23	Windham	
Maryland	Mariela Pepin	23	Severn	Previously Miss Maryland Teen USA 2014; Top 10 finalist at Miss World America 2017; Contestant on season 25 of The Bachelor and season 7 of Bachelor in Paradise
Massachusetts	Kelly O'Grady	28	Boston	
Michigan	Alyse Madej	26	Garden City	
Minnesota	Cat Stanley	23	Bloomington	Previously Miss Minnesota Teen USA 2014
Mississippi	Madeleine Overby	21	Columbus	Former New Orleans Saintsation cheerleader
Missouri	Miriah Jo Ludtke	25	St. Louis	
Montana	Grace Zitzer	27	Dillon	
Nebraska	Lex Najarian	25	Lincoln	
Nevada	Tianna Tuamoheloa	26	Las Vegas	
New Hampshire	Alexis Chinn	22	Manchester	Previously Miss Northwest Earth United States 2016
New Jersey	Manya Saaraswat	21	Marlboro	Later Miss Pennsylvania World 2020
New Mexico	Alejandra Gonzalez	26	Las Cruces	
New York	Florinda Kajtazi	27	Yonkers	
North Carolina	Cheslie Corrinne Kryst	28	Charlotte	
North Dakota	Samantha Redding	22	Burlington	
Ohio	Alice Magoto	21	Cincinnati	Previously Miss Ohio 2016
Oklahoma	Triana Browne	26	Tulsa	Previously Miss Oklahoma 2017
Oregon	Natalie Tonneson	28	Portland	
Pennsylvania	Kailyn Marie Perez	27	Camp Hill	Previously Miss Florida World 2015
Rhode Island	Nicole Pallozzi	23	Providence	
South Carolina	MaKenzie Divina	21	Clemson	
South Dakota	Abigail Merschman	22	Sioux Falls	
Tennessee	Savana Hodge	25	Nashville	
Texas	Alayah Benavidez	23	San Antonio	Previously Miss United States 2016; Contestant on season 24 of The Bachelor
Utah	Amanda Renée Giroux	23	Salt Lake City	
Vermont	Bethany Garrow	20	Rutland	
Virginia	Courtney Lynne Smits	22	Woodbridge	Previously Miss Georgia Teen USA 2012
Washington	Evelyn Clark	27	Cathlamet	
West Virginia	Haley Holloway	24	Morgantown	Previously Miss West Virginia Teen USA 2013
Wisconsin	Danika Tramburg	22	Hubertus	
Wyoming	Addison Treesh	19	Gillette	Previously Miss Wyoming's Outstanding Teen 2014
