= Addison Grace Hadley =

American beauty pageant titleholder

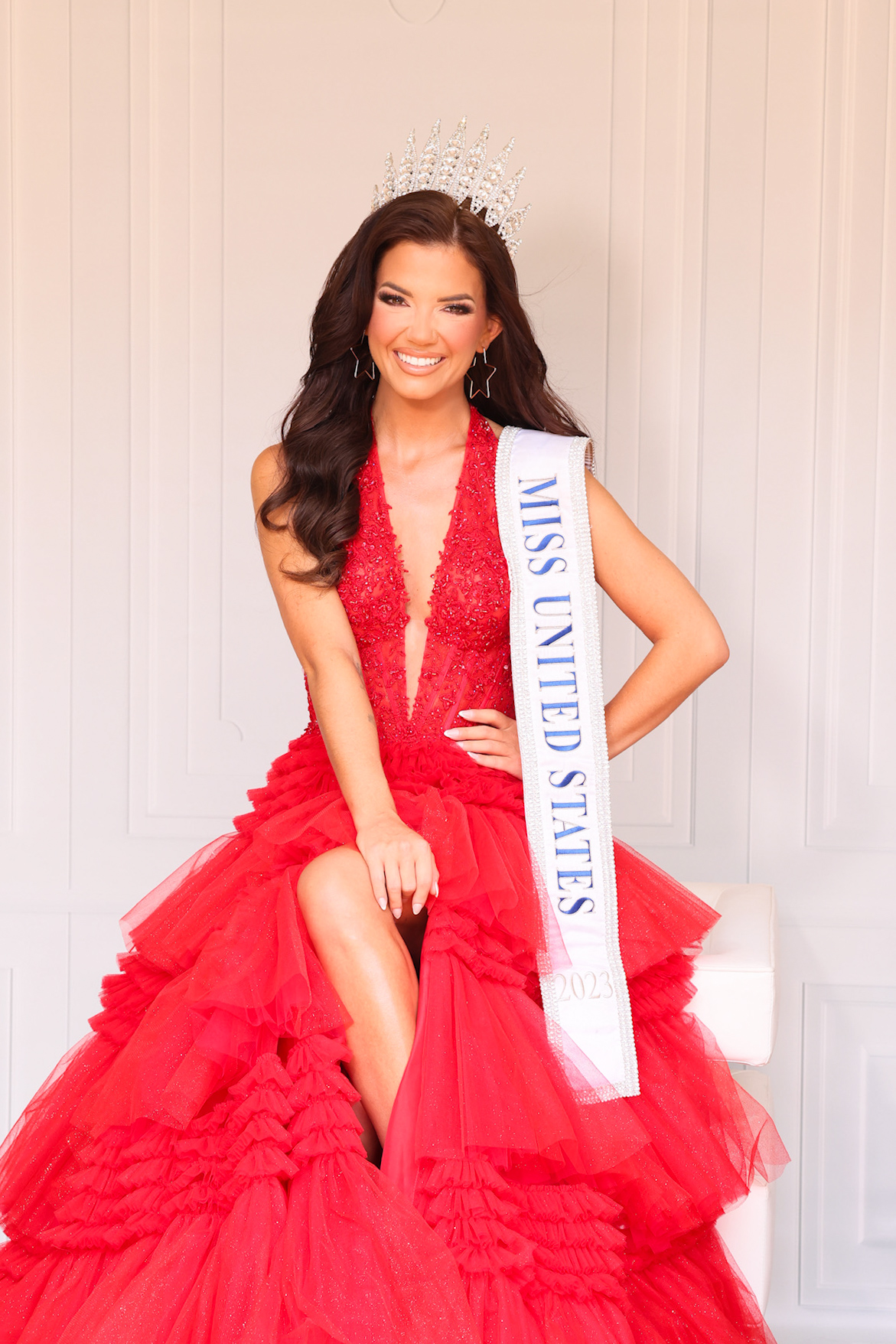
- Hadley as Miss United States in 2023
- Born: Tchula, Mississippi, U.S
- Education: Middle Tennessee State University (BS); Vanderbilt University (MEd)
- Occupation: Mental Health Counselor
- Beauty pageant titleholder
- Title: Miss United States 2023; Miss Tennessee US 2023; Miss Mississippi US 2022
- Years active: 2018–present
- Hair color: Brown
- Major competitions: Miss United States 2023 (Winner)

Addison Grace Hadley is an American beauty pageant titleholder that was crowned Miss United States 2023 on October 22, 2023, at the Cannon Center for Performing Arts in Memphis, Tennessee. Hadley is a professional mental health counselor. Her charitable platform is called "Volunteer to be the Village" and focuses on initiatives to help impoverished children.

== Early life and education ==
Hadley grew up on her family's farm in Tchula, Mississippi. Hadley grew up in an impoverished family and faced food insecurity as a child. Hadley holds a bachelor's degree in political science and psychology from Middle Tennessee State University and a M.Ed. from Vanderbilt University.

== Personal life ==
Hadley converted to Judaism while she was a graduate student at Vanderbilt University. Hadley is queer.

== Pageants ==
Hadley has competed in the Miss United States, Miss America, and Miss Volunteer America pageant systems. Within the Miss America system she held the title of Miss MTSU 2018 (Miss Tennessee). Within the Miss Volunteer America system, she held the titles of Miss Davidson County 2019 (Miss Tennessee Volunteer) and Miss Pine Grove 2021 (Miss Mississippi Volunteer). Within the Miss United States system, she held the titles of Miss Mississippi United States 2022, Miss Tennessee United States 2023, and Miss United States 2023.

Awards and achievements
Preceded by (New York (state)) Lily K. Donaldson	Miss United States; 2023	Succeeded by (Florida) Lindsey Langston
