= Anstett =

Anstett is a surname. Notable people with the name include:

- Dorothy Anstett (born 1947), American pageant titleholder who held the Miss USA 1968 title
- Andy Anstett (born 1946), Canadian politician
- Vincent Anstett (born 1982), French sabre fencer who won gold at the 2006 World Fencing Championships
