= Cory Mills =

American businessman and politician (born 1980)

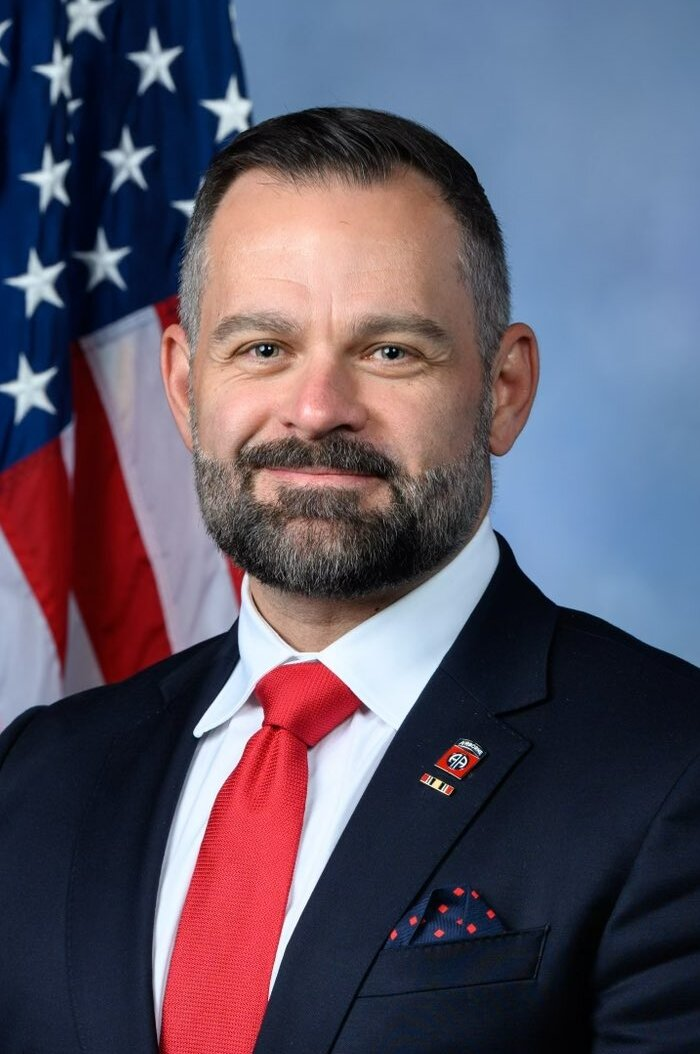
- Official portrait, 2022

Member of the U.S. House of Representatives from Florida's 7th district
- Incumbent
- Assumed office January 3, 2023
- Preceded by: Stephanie Murphy

Personal details
- Born: Cory Lee Mills; July 13, 1980 (age 46)
- Party: Republican
- Spouse: Rana Al Saadi (m. 2014; div. 2026)
- Domestic partner(s): Lindsey Langston (2021–2025)
- Children: 2
- Education: Florida State College at Jacksonville (AA); American Military University (BS, MA)
- Website: House website Campaign website

Military service
- Allegiance: United States
- Branch/service: United States Army
- Years of service: 1999–2003
- Rank: Sergeant
- Unit: 82nd Airborne Division
- Battles/wars: Yugoslav Wars; Kosovo War; Operation Allied Force; Iraq War
- Awards: Bronze Star

Cory Lee Mills (born July 13, 1980) is an American politician, businessman, and Army veteran who has served as the U.S. representative from Florida's 7th congressional district since 2023. A member of the Republican Party, he previously served as a Trump appointee on the Defense Business Board from 2020 to 2021.

Mills joined the United States Army in 1999 and received the Bronze Star while serving as a U.S. Army sniper during a deployment to Iraq in 2003.

Mills lost renomination in the 2026 primary election in part due to him facing multiple investigations involving sexual misconduct and campaign finance violations. His successor, Ryan Elijah, is currently under investigation for campaign finance violations.

== Early life and education ==
Cory Lee Mills was born on July 13, 1980 and raised in Auburndale, Florida. He earned an associate's degree from Florida State College at Jacksonville, followed by a bachelor's and master's degree from American Military University.

== Military service ==
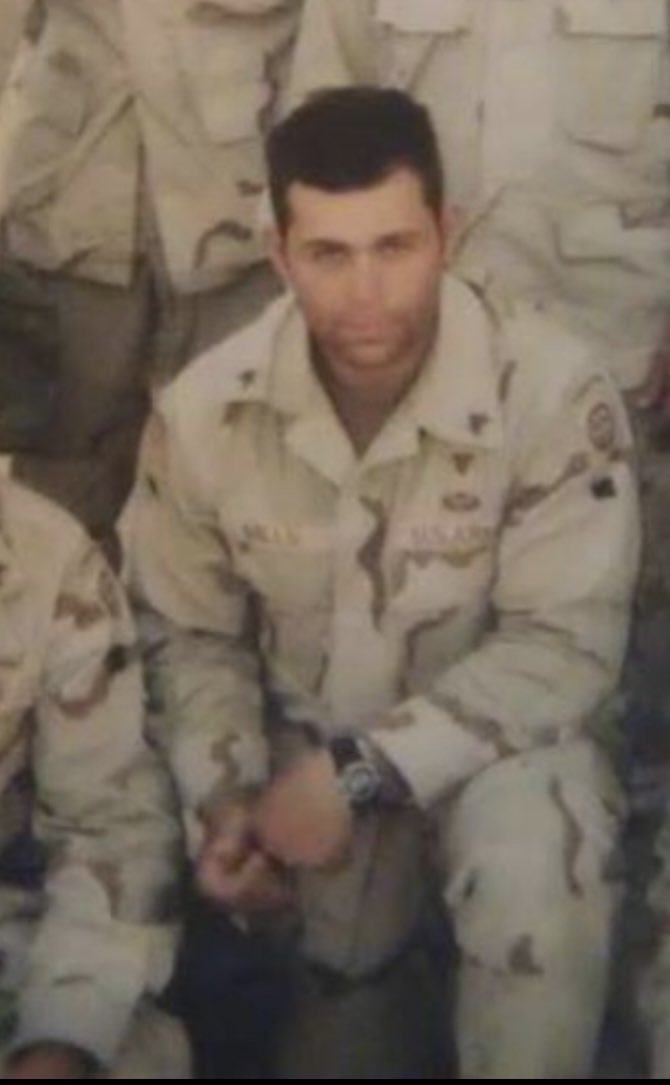
Mills on deployment to Iraq

After graduating from high school, Mills enlisted in the United States Army. He was a member of the 82nd Airborne Division from 1999 to 2003. He took part in Operation Allied Force during the Kosovo War in 1999. Mills was deployed to Iraq in 2003 and received the Bronze Star Medal for saving the lives of two fellow soldiers and other acts. In 2025, NOTUS published a report raising questions about the award following an Army investigation exonerating Mills. One of the two men who had allegedly received life-saving care from Mills under enemy fire said his injuries had not been life-threatening and he and the helicopter pilot did not remember Mills being there. The sergeant whom Mills had allegedly rescued from an enemy insurgent said that the incident did not happen.

After leaving the Army, he earned an associate's degree from Florida State College at Jacksonville.

== Business career ==
From 2005 to 2009, he was a military contractor for DynCorp, working overseas in Iraq and Afghanistan, before working as a maritime security specialist and anti-piracy adviser for Special Tactical Services. He then worked for federal contractors Chemonics International and Pax Mondial Ltd. and as a senior risk manager at Management Systems International.

In 2014, Mills co-founded Pacem Solutions, a risk management and consulting firm with his wife, Rana Al Saadi. The following year, he co-founded Pacem Defense, a private security company. In 2015, the United States Department of Defense facilitated a $228 million arms deal between Pacem and the government of Iraq.

As of 2023, Pacem is indebted $48 million to a Canadian lender and has been forced to close its munitions plant twice by the Florida Department of Financial Services for failing to pay workers' compensation insurance premiums. He is also co-founder of ALS Less-Lethal Systems, a company that manufactures equipment for military and law enforcement clients.

In December 2020, Mills was appointed to the Defense Business Board, a board established to provide independent advice on best business practices to senior leaders within the Defense Department. In February 2021, President Joe Biden ordered Secretary Lloyd Austin to suspend all members of the Pentagon's advisory boards (including the DBB) and to ask that all Trump appointees step down.

== U.S. House of Representatives ==
=== Elections ===
==== 2022 ====
Mills announced his candidacy for the U.S. House of Representatives in Florida's 7th district in April 2021, challenging incumbent Democratic representative Stephanie Murphy. Murphy's seat was a target for the National Republican Congressional Committee in the 2022 elections, but she announced her retirement in December 2021. Redistricting made the 7th significantly more Republican than its predecessor, cutting out its share of Orlando (including Murphy's home) while adding a slice of increasingly Republican Volusia County.

Mills faced a crowded primary, with his strongest opponent being state representative Anthony Sabatini. Mills won the primary election in August 2022, earning over a third of the vote and beating Sabatini by over 10,000 votes. Mills defeated Democratic nominee Karen Green in the November general election with 58.5% of the vote.

==== Evacuation of an American family from Afghanistan ====
Mills, as a congressional candidate, in September 2021, evacuated a woman and her three children from Afghanistan during the 2021 American withdrawal. Initially, he was going to attempt to perform an airlift, but U.S. Central Command and the State Department denied the request. Instead, he had to evacuate the family by land.

Mills had initially planned to travel to Afghanistan as part of a larger group. However, three members of the group later claimed that they saw Mills with a group of sex workers during a stopover in Tbilisi, Georgia. This led to Mills being ejected from the group, and he subsequently traveled to Afghanistan alone.

==== 2024 ====
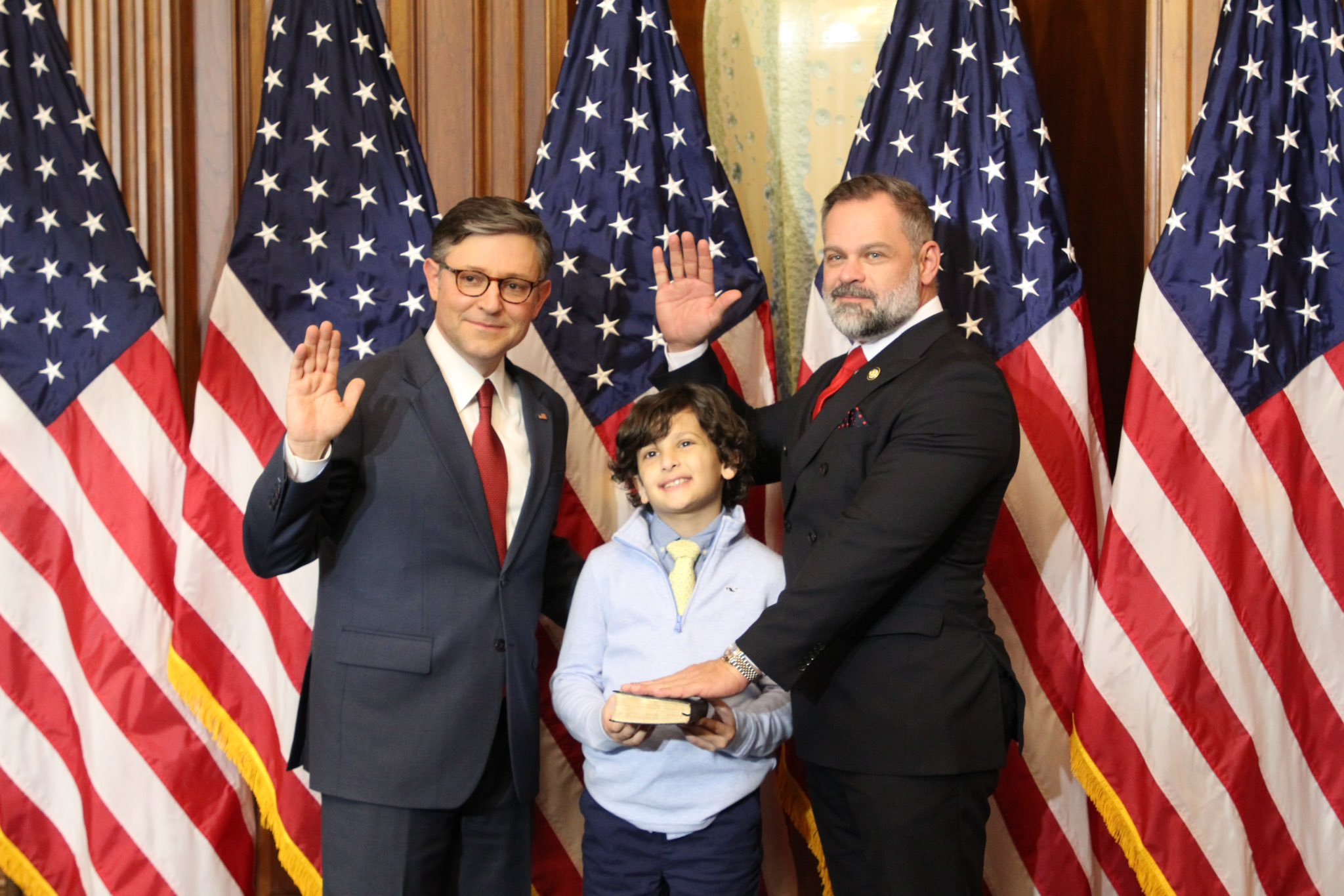
Mills being sworn in to the 119th Congress by Speaker Mike Johnson

In 2024, Mills was challenged in the Republican primary by former state senate candidate Mike Johnson (no relation to Speaker Mike Johnson). He defeated Johnson in the primary, receiving 80.9% of the vote. Mills went on to defeat Democratic nominee Jennifer Adams in the general election, receiving 56.5% of the vote.

=== Tenure ===
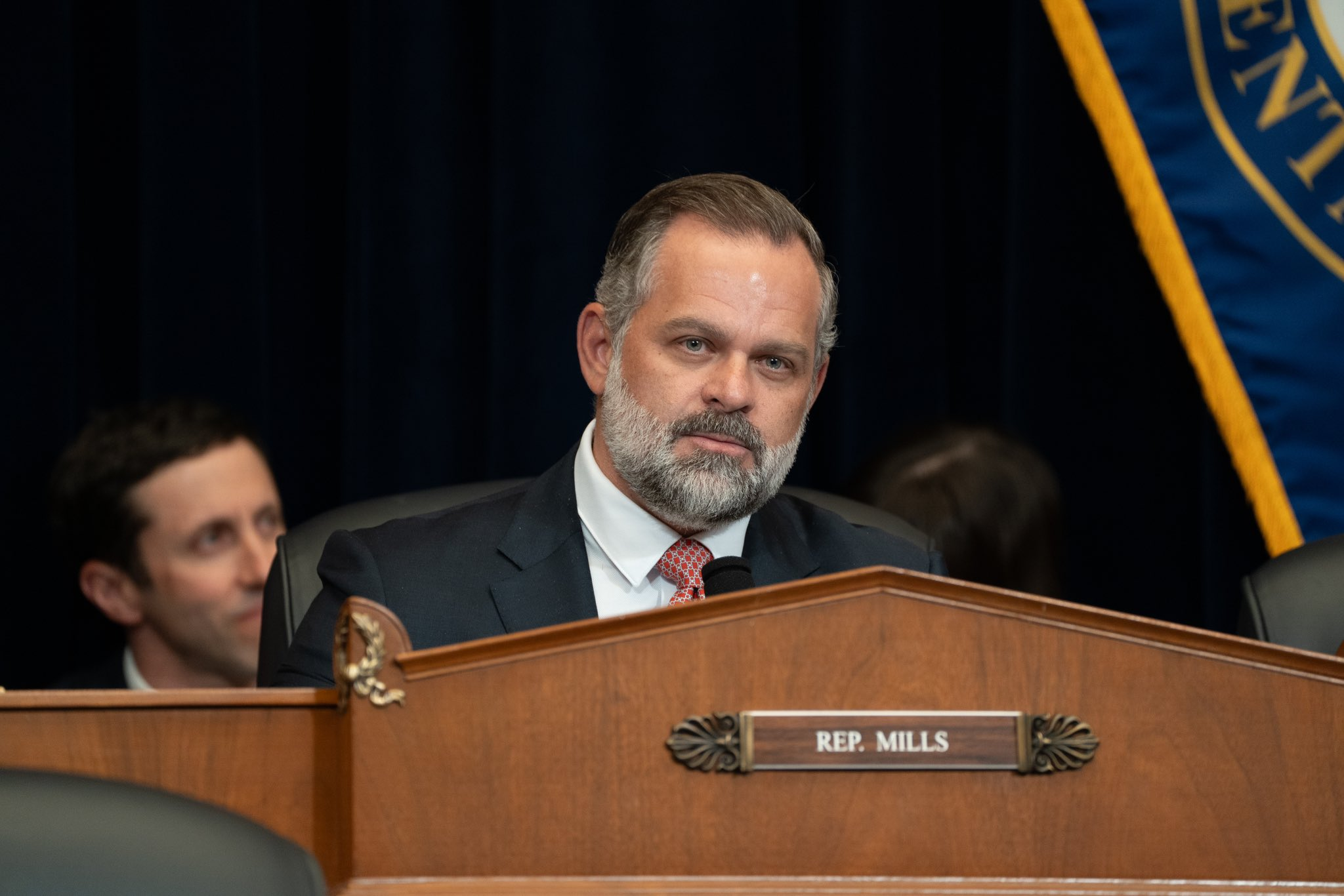
Mills presiding as Chair of the House Foreign Affairs Oversight and Intelligence Subcommittee, 2025

Mills handed out commemorative 40 mm grenades stamped with the Republican Party logo to fellow House members as a welcoming gift.

In May 2023, Mills co-sponsored a resolution by Marjorie Taylor Greene to impeach President Joe Biden over his handling of security at the United States-Mexico border. On May 23, 2023, he also co-sponsored Greene's resolutions to impeach Attorney General Merrick Garland, FBI director Christopher Wray, Secretary of Homeland Security Alejandro Mayorkas, and U.S. attorney for D.C. Matthew M. Graves.

In October 2023, Mills traveled to Israel to help evacuate 77 Americans in the wake of the October 7 attacks.

Mills also helped airlift 10 Americans who were volunteering at an orphanage in Haiti, amidst Haiti's state of crisis. He also criticized Biden's handling of the crisis and similar crises. Later, he helped rescue an additional 13 people.

==== Syria ====
In 2023, Mills was among 47 Republicans to vote in favor of H.Con.Res. 21, which directed President Joe Biden to remove U.S. troops from Syria within 180 days.

Following the fall of the Assad regime, Mills and fellow Republican representative Marlin Stutzman became the first American politicians to visit post-Ba'athist Syria. Both met Syrian president Ahmed al-Sharaa and the country's Christian leaders on April 18, 2025. The visit was made while the Trump administration was considering sanctions relief on Syria and Mills stated there was a "tremendous amount of opportunity here to help rebuild the nation but also to help with stabilization across the region."

==== 2024 presidential election ====
Mills became the fourth representative from Florida to endorse Donald Trump for president in the 2024 presidential election, citing the need for Republican unity following Trump's indictment.

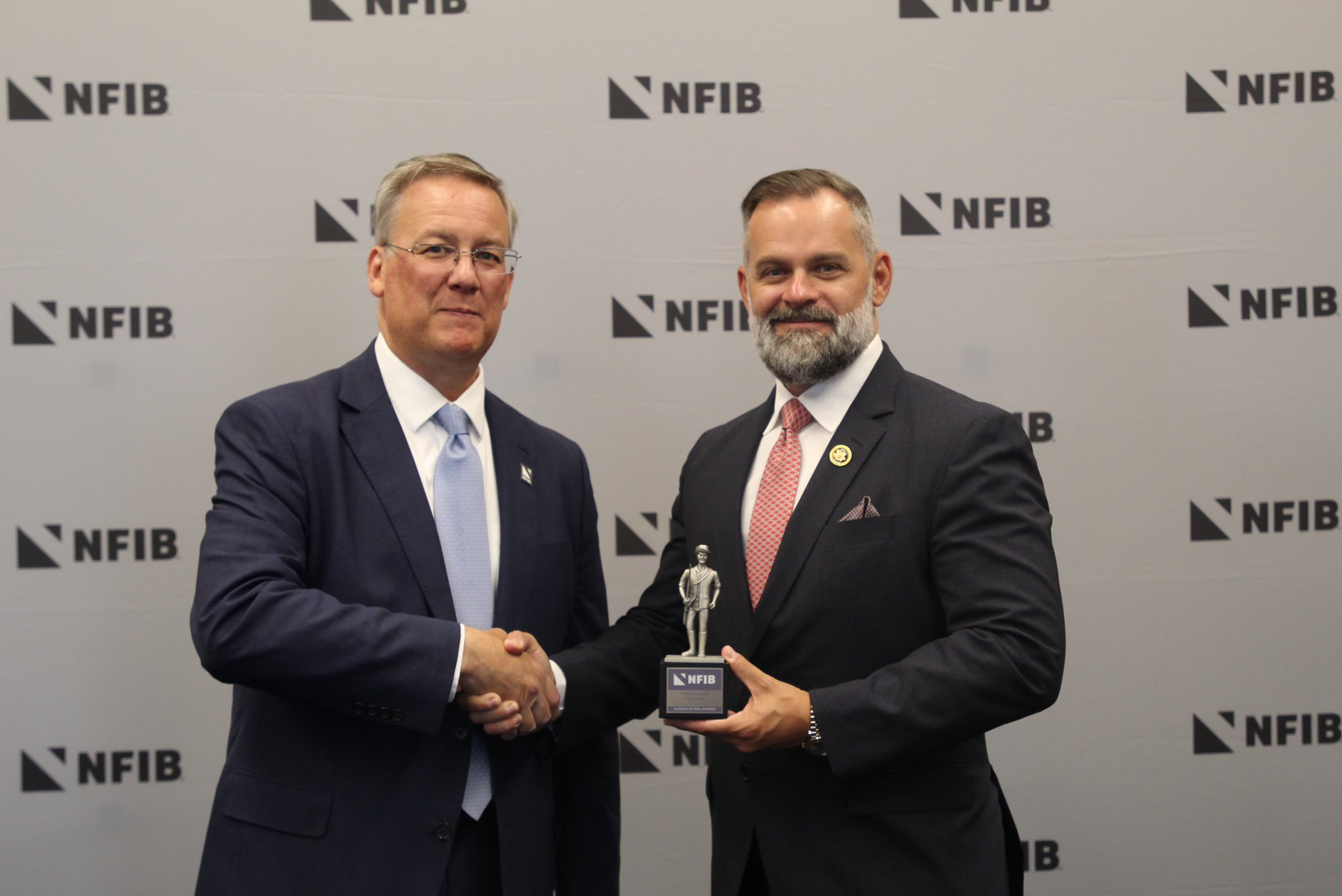
Mills receiving the "Guardian of Small Business Award" from the National Federation of Independent Business, 2024

=== Committee assignments ===
For the 118th Congress:

- Committee on Armed Services
  - Subcommittee on Intelligence and Special Operations
  - Subcommittee on Military Personnel
- Committee on Foreign Affairs
  - Subcommittee on Africa
  - Subcommittee on Oversight and Accountability

=== Ethics investigation ===
The board of the independent Office of Congressional Ethics investigated inconsistent financial statements in August 2024; their report stated "The OCE found that from January 2023 to present, Pacem Defense/ALS, has been actively contracting with the federal government, securing close to $1,000,000 in federal contracts for munitions and weapons, distributed to prisons across the country...Specifically, since January 9, 2024, 94 contracts have been awarded to entities owned by Rep. Mills."

Mills denied wrongdoing but did not cooperate with the OCE's investigations, refusing to provide tax returns or explain the ownership structure of his companies. On March 27, 2025, the House Ethics Committee announced it would investigate Mills for violating federal laws and House rules that prohibit members of Congress from contracting with the government.

On November 19, the House Ethics Committee announced it was forming an investigative subcommittee to investigate the previous allegations of fraud made against Mills, as well as two alleged incidents involving Mills' conduct with women.

== Personal life ==
In 2014, Mills married Rana Al Saadi, an Iraqi refugee who gained naturalized American citizenship and served in the first Trump administration, which was his second marriage. Mills has two sons. By 2015, Mills and Al Saadi were undergoing divorce proceedings. He began dating Lindsey Langston in 2021. Langston ended the relationship following his February 2025 arrest for assault.

Mills has been residing in a luxury Maryland Avenue SW penthouse with a rent of US$20,833 per month. On January 22, 2025, the property manager provided Mills with a ledger showing Mills had consistently paid his rent late, racking up nearly US$15,000 in late fees over the previous 18 months. By July 2025, Mills faced eviction as he did not pay more than US$85,000 in rent between March and July.

=== Domestic assault ===
On February 21, 2025, the Metropolitan Police Department of the District of Columbia announced they were investigating an alleged physical assault of a woman by Mills at his luxury penthouse. Although she listed the same address as her home, the woman was not Mills's wife. The police report describes Mills as her "significant other for over a year." According to the police report of the incident, the alleged victim stated that Mills "grabbed her, shoved her, and pushed her out of the door." Mills was not arrested because the alleged victim recanted details of the incident.

On February 24, it was revealed that the Metropolitan Police Department sent an arrest warrant for Mills to interim U.S. Attorney for the District of Columbia Ed Martin on February 21, but, for unclear reasons, it was not signed by Martin. This led to MSNBC News Producer Steve Benen speculating that the arrest warrant was not signed because Martin wanted to "go easy on a Republican member of Congress as part of a broader political agenda". Mills has repeatedly denied any wrongdoing in the matter.

=== Revenge porn allegations ===
On August 6, 2025, media outlets reported that Lindsey Langston, a Republican Party of Florida committee member and Miss United States 2024, had filed a lawsuit alleging that Mills threatened to release nude videos of her after she ended their relationship and that he threatened to harm any future romantic partners of hers. Langston told the Columbia County Sheriff's Department that she was in a relationship with Mills from November 2021 until February 2025, ending it after seeing reports of his alleged assault.

On October 14, 2025, a Florida judge granted Langston a restraining order against Mills through the end of 2025. The order was issued by the judge after he had concluded that "the woman was either a victim of dating violence or that she had reason to believe she was in danger of becoming a victim of dating violence."

== Electoral history ==
2022 Florida's 7th congressional district Republican primary
Party	Candidate	Votes	%
Republican	Cory Mills	27,452	38.06
Republican	Anthony Sabatini	17,059	23.65
Republican	Brady Duke	11,010	15.26
Republican	Ted Edwards	4,197	5.82
Republican	Russell Roberts	3,970	5.50
Republican	Erika Benfield	3,912	5.42
Republican	Scott Sturgill	3,055	4.24
Republican	Al Santos	1,480	2.05
Total votes		72,135	100.00

2022 Florida's 7th congressional district election
Party	Candidate	Votes	%
Republican	Cory Mills	177,966	58.53
Democratic	Karen Green	126,079	41.47
Write-in	Cardon Pompey	10	0.00
Total votes		304,045	100.00
Republican gain from Democratic			

2024 Florida's 7th congressional district Republican primary
Party	Candidate	Votes	%
Republican	Cory Mills (incumbent)	43,096	80.09
Republican	Mike Johnson	10,188	19.1
Total votes		53,284	100.00

2024 Florida's 7th congressional district election
Party	Candidate	Votes	%
Republican	Cory Mills (incumbent)	233,937	56.5
Democratic	Jennifer Adams	179,917	43.5
Total votes		413,854	100.00
Republican hold			

2026 Florida's 7th congressional district Republican primary
Party	Candidate	Votes	%
Republican	Ryan Elijah	31,532	47.3
Republican	Cory Mills (incumbent)	22,737	34.1
Republican	Sarah Ulrich	7,004	10.5
Republican	Mike Johnson	5,406	8.1
Total votes		66,679	100.00

== See also ==
- List of United States representatives who lost re-election in a primary

U.S. House of Representatives
Preceded by Stephanie Murphy	Member of the U.S. House of Representatives from Florida's 7th congressional district 2023–present	Incumbent
U.S. order of precedence (ceremonial)
Preceded by Max Miller	United States representatives by seniority 337th	Succeeded by Nathaniel Moran
