= Cannon Center for the Performing Arts =

Multi-purpose venue in Memphis, Tennessee, US

Coordinates: 35.1508°N 90.0512°W

The Cannon Center for the Performing Arts is a 2,051-seat multi-purpose venue in Memphis, Tennessee. Home to the Memphis Symphony Orchestra, it opened in 2003. It also hosts comedians, stage plays and children's theater, ballet, beauty pageants, concerts, and more. It has previously hosted the Memphis mayor's swearing in ceremony, the Memphis Music Hall of Fame ceremony, and the Miss United States pageant. The center had a complete cosmetic update, along with the associated Cook Convention Center, in 2018.
