= Andromeda Peters =

Ghanaian and American beauty pageant titleholder, model, and psychotherapist

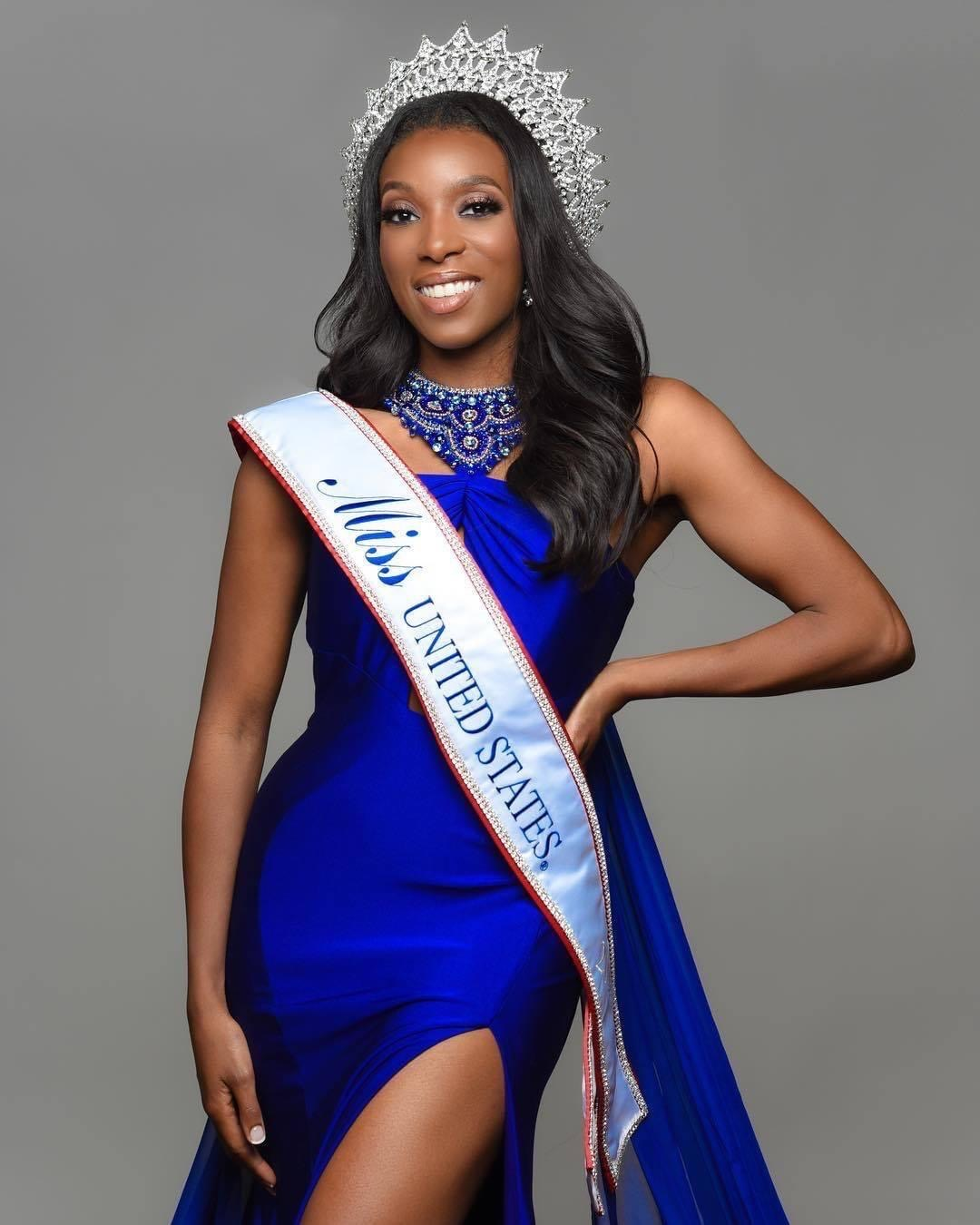
- Peters in 2018
- Born: Andromeda Peters; Springfield, Massachusetts, U.S
- Education: Elms College (BS); Springfield College (MSW)
- Occupations: Actress; psychotherapist
- Beauty pageant titleholder
- Title: Miss Universe Ghana 2025; Miss United States 2018; Miss Virginia United States 2018
- Years active: 2018–present
- Major competitions: Miss United States 2018 (Winner); Miss Universe Ghana 2025 (Winner); Miss Universe 2025 (Unplaced)
- Website: www.andromedapeters.com

Andromeda Osam-Peters (born June 11, 1998) is a Ghanaian beauty pageant titleholder who won Miss United States 2018, and Miss Universe Ghana 2025. She represented Ghana at Miss Universe 2025, and was unplaced.

== Early life and education ==
Peters was born in Springfield, Massachusetts. Her Ghanaian father is a highlife musician, and her mother, a nurse. She became involved in theatre and acting at the age of 11. Peters holds a Bachelor of Science in psychology with a minor in Theatre from Elms College and a Master of Social Work from Springfield College. Peters is a licensed psychotherapist providing therapy and life coaching with a focus on mindfulness, trauma, and neuroscience. She is an advocate for Mental healthawareness, and founder of her own mental health organization Your Mind Matters Global.

== Pageantry ==
Peters represented Virginia and won Miss United States 2018. Peters was appointed Miss Universe Ghana 2025 and represented Ghana at Miss Universe 2025, where she was unplaced.

== TV ==
She starred in the reality TV show My African Love With Efia Odo in 2022.

== Personal life ==
Peters' father was of Ghanaian descent, and her mother is of Black Foot and Wampanoag Native American, English, and Filipino descent.

Awards and achievements
Preceded by Alina Ponomarenko	Miss Universe Ghana; 2025	Succeeded by Belvy Ofori Naa
Preceded by Rachael Todd	Miss United States; 2018	Succeeded by Alexia Robinson
