= Tiffany Ann Rea =

American beauty pageant titleholder

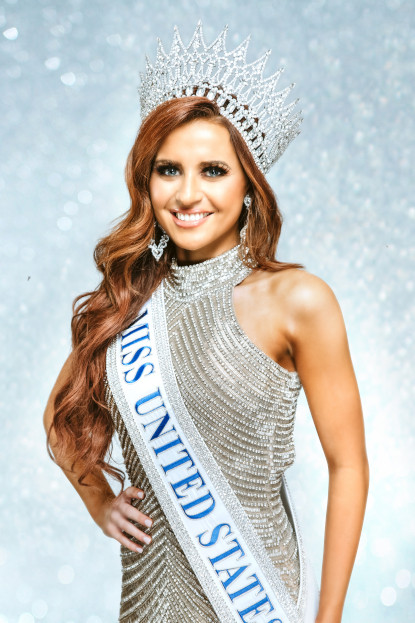
- Rea in 2020
- Born: October 27, 1996 (age 29); Lewiston, Idaho, U.S
- Education: Cerro Coso Community College; Liberty University
- Occupation: Community Outreach director
- Beauty pageant titleholder
- Title: Miss United States 2020; Miss Washington USA 2024; Miss Teen Earth United States 2014
- Years active: 2009–present
- Major competition: Miss United States 2020 (Winner)

Tiffany Ann Rea (born October 27, 1996) is an American beauty pageant titleholder who won Miss United States 2020. On June 27, 2024 Rea was crowned Miss Washington USA 2024 and represented Washington at Miss USA 2024, was unplaced.

== Early life and education ==
Tiffany Ann Rea was born in Lewiston, Idaho and moved to Tehachapi, California when she was a young child. She began competing in pageants at the age of nine. Rea has four brothers, and she is the youngest child in her family. She is the daughter of Ted and Debbie Rea.

Rea attended Cerro Coso Community College and Liberty University. She has degrees in crime scene investigation and psychology and studied latent fingerprint analysis.

Rea worked for the Tehachapi Police Department and for the City of Tehachapi during the COVID-19 pandemic and was part of the city's COVID-19 resource team. Rea is a Community Outreach director in Kern County, California.

== Pageantry ==
Rea's first won "Junior Miss East Kern County, California City" in 2009. Rea won the title of Miss Teen Earth United States in 2014. She has won Miss Tehachapi 2014, Miss Kern County 2019 and 2020, Miss California United States 2020, Miss United States 2020, and Miss Washington USA 2024. Rea won a pageant every year from 2009 to 2020, when she won the title of Miss United States 2020. After Miss United States, she continued to compete within the Miss USA organization.

Awards and achievements
Preceded by Samantha Gallia	Miss Washington USA; 2024	Succeeded by Carisa Erickson
Preceded by Alexia Robinson, Missouri	Miss United States; 2020	Succeeded by Samantha Keene Anderson, Arizona
