= Alayah Benavidez =

American beauty pageant titleholder

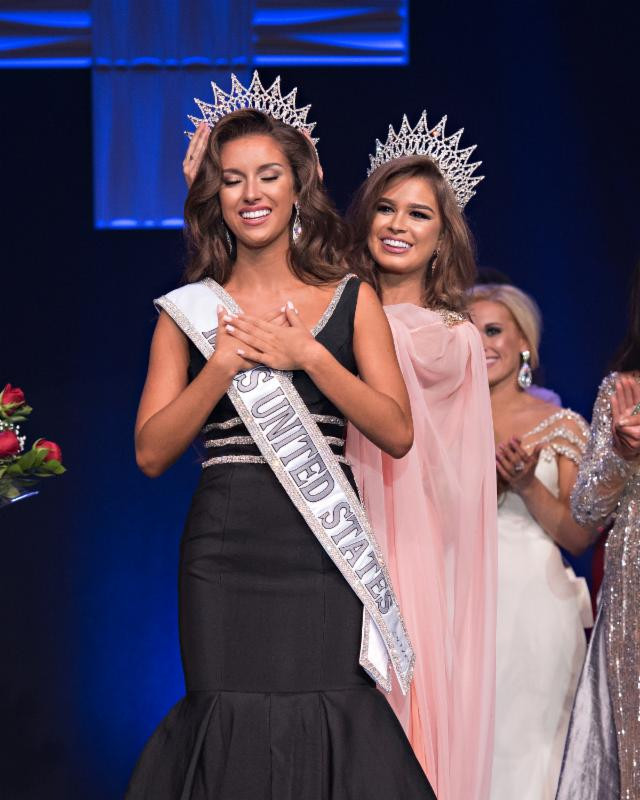
Miss United States 2015, Summer Priester, crowning Alayah Benavidez during the Miss United States 2016 competition.

Alayah Benavidez (born August 7, 1995) is an American beauty pageant titleholder from San Antonio, Texas, who was crowned Miss United States 2016. Benavidez was also crowned Miss Texas USA 2019, and represented Texas at Miss USA 2019. Benavidez appeared on The Bachelor Season 24. She attended the University of Texas at San Antonio.

Awards and achievements
Preceded by Logan Lester	Miss Texas USA; 2019	Succeeded by Taylor Kessler
Preceded by Summer Priester	Miss United States; 2016	Succeeded by Rachael Todd
