= Carisa Erickson =

American beauty pageant titleholder

- Height: 5 ft 7 in / 170cm
- Beauty pageant titleholder
- Title: Miss Washington USA 2025
- Hair color: Blond
- Eye color: Blue
- Major competitions: Miss Washington USA 2025 (Winner); Miss USA 2025 (Unplaced)

Carisa Erickson is an American model, mental health advocate, pageant titleholder and public figure from Washington State, best known for holding the title Miss Washington USA 2025 and competing in the Miss USA 2025 pageant.

== Early life and pageantry ==
Erickson studied political science and pre-law at Oregon State University.

Erickson began participating in pageants as a teenager. She competed in the Miss Oregon Teen USA 2005 pageant in November 2004 and came in first runner-up, winning the Miss Congeniality title. She entered the Miss Oregon USA pageant and came in the Top 10 in November 2005 for Miss Oregon USA. She participated in Miss Oregon USA again in November 2007 and became second runner-up in 2008.

In October 2008, Erickson competed in the Miss Washington USA 2009 pageant, becoming one of the Top 10 contestants. She stopped participating in pageants because of her marriage. She returned to the pageants in 2020 by winning the title of USOA Mrs. Washington 2021.

Erickson went back to school in 2020 to pursue studies in psychology at the University of Phoenix and Southern New Hampshire University. following a postpartum depression and anxiety that she suffered.

In January 2021, she was listed as a model with Hannah Noelle Models. Erickson participated in the Top Model Competition and formal runway competitions at the America's Most Beautiful Pageant in Dallas, Texas in July 2023. In June 2024, she participated as a model in the Rossario George Evolution in Fashion Runway Show in Seattle. She was also listed as a model with the Global Beauty Awards in April 2024.

In 2025, Erickson won the Miss Washington USA after winning first runner-up at Miss Washington USA 2024. She represented Washington at Miss USA 2025 in Reno, Nevada.

Awards and achievements
Preceded by Tiffany Ann Rea	Miss Washington USA; 2025	Succeeded by Ellise Kakazu
