= Samantha Keene Anderson =

American beauty pageant titleholder

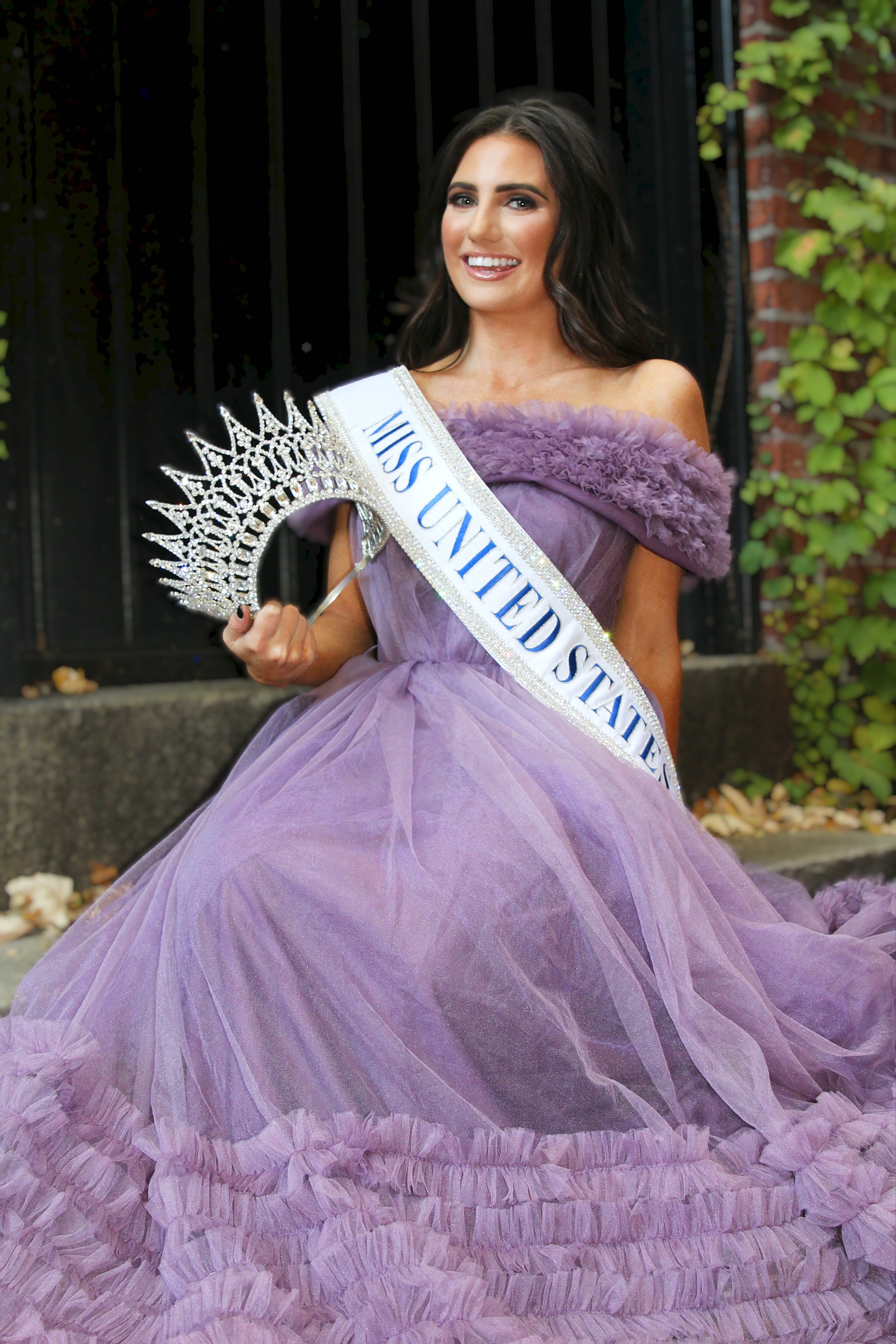
- Born: Samantha Keene Andersion; December 12, 1997 (age 28)
- Education: Virginia Tech; Loyola University Baltimore
- Beauty pageant titleholder
- Title: Miss United States 2021; Miss United Universe 2023; Miss Teen Arizona 2014
- Years active: 2014–present
- Major competition: Miss United States 2021 (Winner)

Samantha Anderson (born 1997) is an American beauty pageant titleholder from Chandler, Arizona, who won Miss United States 2021. She is a Montessori teacher and an advocate for women in aviation.

== Personal life ==
Anderson grew up in the Ahwatukee Foothills in Phoenix, Arizona. She attended Grace Community Christian School in Tempe and Desert Vista High School in Phoenix. Her father, Sherman, was a veteran of the war in Vietnam. Anderson was orphaned in 2014 when both of her parents were killed in a plane crash. Anderson's mother, Sherry, was one of the first female pilots to fly for a commercial airline and was a member of the International Society of Women Pilots (ISA-21). Anderson's mother also competed in pageants as a teen. Anderson won the title of Miss Teen Arizona (National American Miss) just two months after her parents' deaths.

After her parents' death, Anderson became an advocate for diversity in aviation. As of 2024, Anderson works as a partner relations specialist at NEXTGEN Aviators by Dynamic Aviation, a nonprofit that promotes STEM education and technical careers through aviation. Anderson identifies as LGBTQ and is a member of the National Gay Pilots Association.

As of 2021, Anderson resides in Blacksburg, Virginia.

== Education ==
Anderson completed a bachelor's degree in Family and Consumer Sciences from Virginia Tech in 2019. While at Virginia Tech, she was a member of the Kappa Alpha Theta sorority. She spend two years at Arizona State University before transferring to Virginia Tech. Anderson completed a master's degree in Elementary Education and Montessori Studies from Loyola University Baltimore in 2020.

== Pageants ==
Anderson previously held the title of Miss Teen Arizona 2014, Miss Virginia United States 2019, and Miss Virginia 2020 under the National American Miss (NAM) system. She won Miss United States in 2021. Anderson won Miss United States on October 10, 2021, in Las Vegas, Nevada. During her year as Miss United States, Anderson attended events promoting Girls in Aviation. In 2024, she won Miss United Universe with a platform to advocate sustainable living and environmental stewardship

Awards and achievements
Preceded by Tiffany Ann Rea, California	Miss United States; 2021	Succeeded by Lily K. Donaldson, New York
