= United States House Foreign Affairs Subcommittee on Oversight and Intelligence =

U.S. House subcommittee

The U.S. House Foreign Affairs Subcommittee on Oversight and Intelligence is a standing subcommittee within the United States House Committee on Foreign Affairs. It was established for the 118th United States Congress.

== Jurisdiction ==
There is no specific regional oversight focus of the Oversight and Intelligence Subcommittee. This subcommittee shall have functional jurisdiction over the following: (A) The United States Mission to the United Nations; (B) The Bureau of International Organizations Affairs; (C) Offices that report directly to the Secretary of State, to include: Office of the Ombuds, Office of Civil Rights, Office of Global Women's Issues, Bureau of Intelligence and Research, Bureau of Legislative Affairs, Office of the Legal Adviser, Office of Policy Planning, Office of the Chief of Protocol, Office of Diversity and Inclusion, and all Special Envoys and Special Representatives.

== Members, 119th Congress ==
Majority	Minority
Cory Mills, Florida, Chair; Scott Perry, Pennsylvania; Darrell Issa, California; Anna Paulina Luna, Florida; Warren Davidson, Ohio; Jim Baird, Indiana; Tim Burchett, Tennessee; Ronny Jackson, Texas	Jared Moskowitz, Florida, Ranking Member; Sarah McBride, Delaware

== Historical subcommittee rosters ==
=== 118th Congress ===
Majority	Minority
Brian Mast, Florida, Chair; Scott Perry, Pennsylvania; Darrell Issa, California; Tim Burchett, Tennessee; French Hill, Arkansas; Michael Waltz, Florida; Cory Mills, Florida; Nathaniel Moran, Texas	Jason Crow, Colorado, Ranking Member; Dina Titus, Nevada; Colin Allred, Texas; Andy Kim, New Jersey; Sheila Cherfilus-McCormick, Florida; Madeleine Dean, Pennsylvania
