= Madison Hickman =

Miss United States 2024

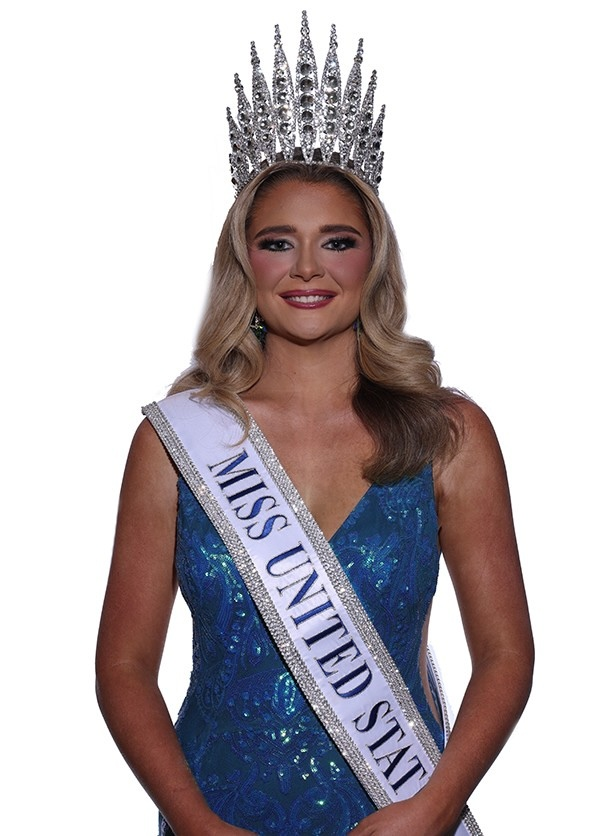
- Hickman as Miss United States in 2025
- Occupation: College Student
- Beauty pageant titleholder
- Title: Miss United States 2025
- Major competitions: Miss United States 2025 (Winner)

Madison Hickman is an American beauty pageant titleholder who won Miss United States 2025. She was crowned Miss United States in Las Vegas, Nevada, on November 4, 2025.

== Biography ==
Hickman is from San Antonio, Texas. She was raised by a single mother and has dyslexia. Hickman graduated from John Marshall High School in San Antonio in 2022. In high school, Hickman participated in her school's band as a saxophonist and drum major, was President of the Debate Team and Varsity Swim Team Captain.

As of 2025, Hickman is enrolled at a psychology major at Texas A&M University-Corpus Christi. Her pageant charitable platform is raising awareness about dyslexia. In September 2025, Hickman authored "The Dyslexic Strategy Workbook for Early Elementary" published by Barnes & Noble Press.

On November 4, 2025, Hickman was crowned Miss United States at the 2025 competition in Las Vegas, Nevada while representing her home state as Miss Texas.

Awards and achievements
Preceded by Lindsey Langston	Miss United States; 2025	Succeeded by incumbent
