= Lindsey Langston =

Miss United States 2024

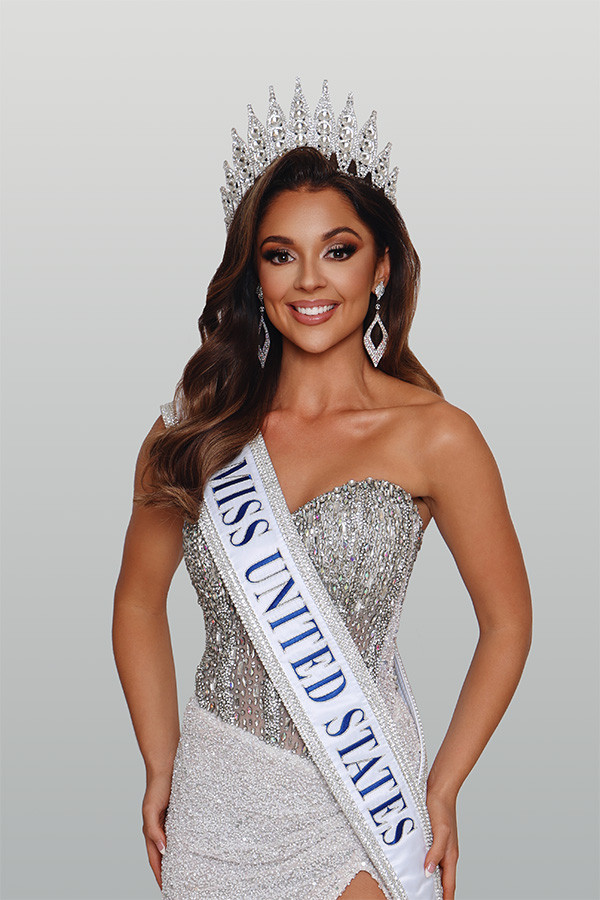
- Langston as Miss United States in 2024
- Born: April 1999 (age 27)
- Political party: Republican
- Beauty pageant titleholder
- Title: Miss United States 2024
- Major competitions: Miss United States 2024 (Winner)

Lindsey Langston (born April 18, 1999) is an American beauty pageant titleholder who won Miss United States 2024. She was crowned Miss United States in Memphis, Tennessee on October 8, 2024, while representing her home state as Miss Florida.

== Biography ==
Langston is from Lake City, Florida. In August 2024, she was elected as the Republican State Committeewoman for the Columbia County Florida GOP. Langston was previously Miss Florida United States 2024, USA National Miss Florida 2021, and Miss U.S. National Forestry 2023. Langston is a children's book author and advocate for the American Agriculture industry. In 2025, she competed for Maxim's cover girl competition to support a charity called Soldier's Angels which supports active military members and veterans.

On August 6, 2025, media outlets reported that Langston had filed a lawsuit alleging that U.S. Representative Cory Mills had threatened to release nude videos of her after she ended their relationship and threatened to harm any future romantic partners of hers. Langston told the Columbia County Sheriff’s Department that she was in a relationship with Mills from November 2021 until February 2025, ending it after seeing reports that he had allegedly assaulted another woman.

Awards and achievements
Preceded by Addison Grace Hadley	Miss United States; 2024	Succeeded by Madison Hickman
