= Miss Washington USA =

Beauty pageant competition

- Formation: 1952
- Type: Beauty pageant
- Headquarters: Puyallup
- Location: Washington
- Members: Miss USA
- Official language: English
- Website: misswashingtonusa.com

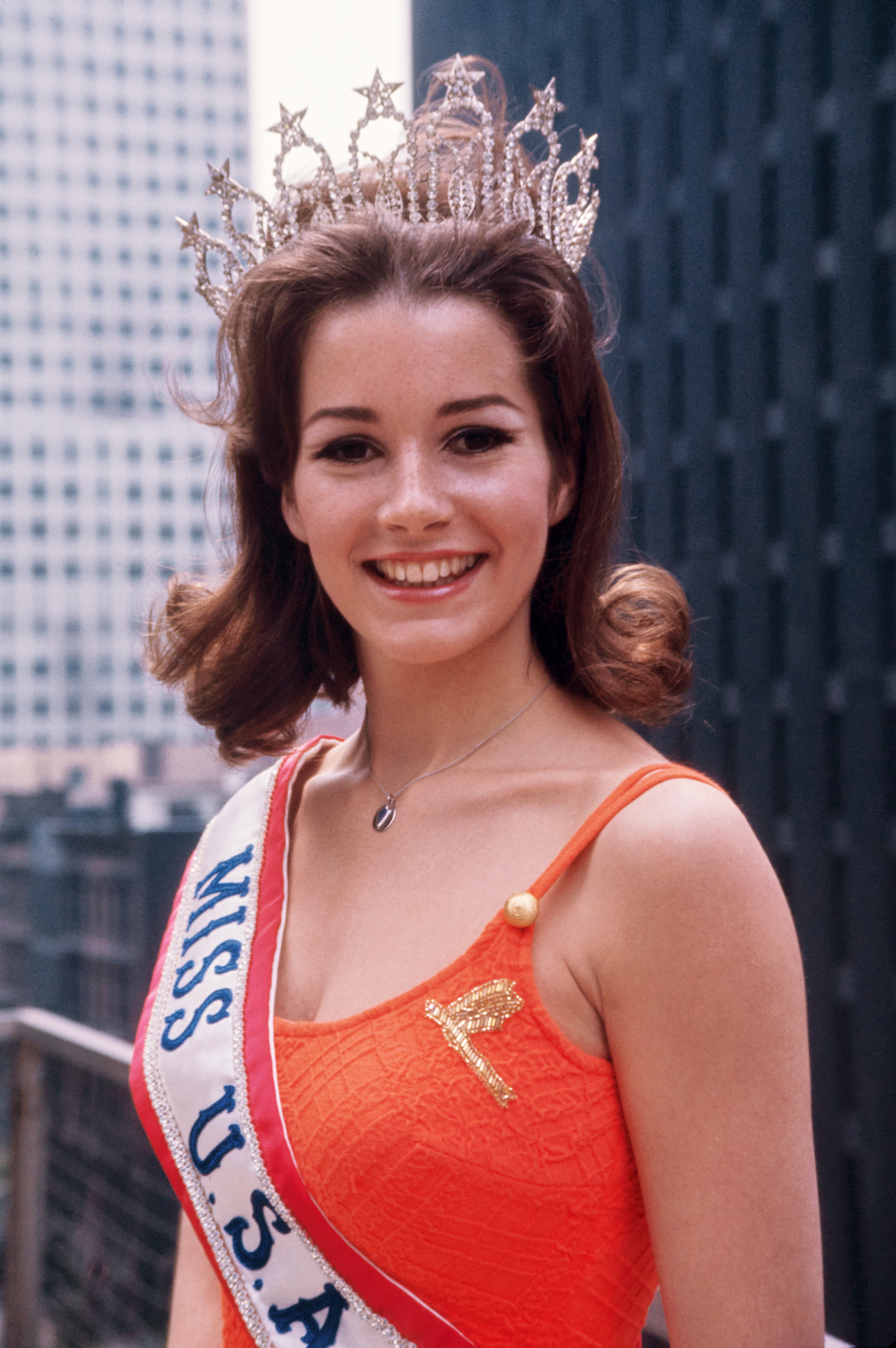
Dorothy Anstett, Miss Washington USA 1968 & Miss USA 1968

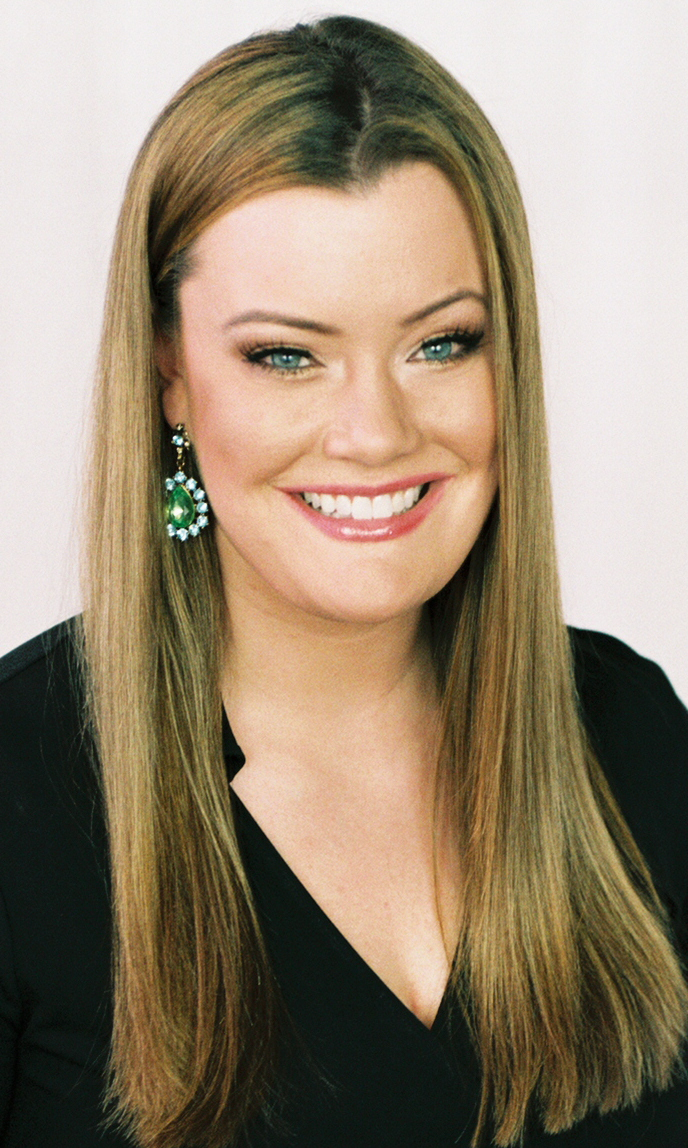
Jamie Kern, Miss Washington USA 2000

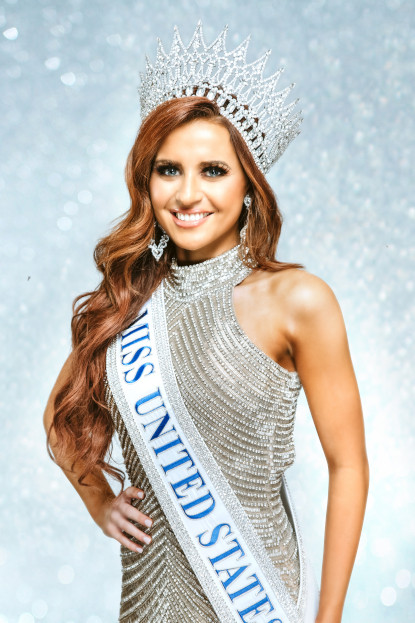
Tiffany Rea, Miss Washington USA 2024

The Miss Washington USA competition is the pageant that selects the representative for the state of Washington in the Miss USA pageant. It is currently produced by Pageants NW Productions based in Puyallup, Washington since 2002, which also produces Idaho and Oregon state pageants.

Washington has been moderately successful in terms of number of semi-finalists and placements, and has had one Miss USA. Dorothy "Didi" Anstett won the crown in 1968 and went on to place 4th runner-up at Miss Universe. The most recent placement was Samantha Gallia in 2023, placing Top 20.

Prior to 2017, no Washington delegate had previously competed at Miss Teen USA, although one has competed at Miss America. Alex Carlson-Helo, Miss Washington Teen USA 2012, became the last state to have made her the first Teen to Miss crossover for the state.

Ellise Kakazu of Pearl City, HI was appointed Miss Washington USA on July 30th, 2026 after the open casting call from Thomas Brodeur, the new owner of the national pageant. She will represent Washington at Miss USA 2026.

== Results summary ==
- Miss USA: Dorothy "Didi" Anstett (1968)
- 1st runner-up: Tracey Goddard (1979)
- 3rd runner-up: Nancy Petraborg (1953)
- Top 10/12: Norene Gilbert (1976), Kathi Tucker (1983), Natasha Vantramp (1998)
- Top 15/20: Shirley Givins (1955), June Svedin (1956), Diana Schafer (1957), Rose Nielsen (1958), Deborah Gieberson (1969), Susan Hyde (1970), Tara McCormick (2004), Samantha Gallia (2023)
- Washington holds a record of 14 Placements at Miss USA.

=== Awards ===
- Miss Congeniality: Breann Parriott (2003), Imani Blackmon (2020)

== Winners ==
Color key

- Declared as Winner
- Ended as runner-up
- Ended as one of the finalists or semifinalists

Year	Name	Age (Note: Age at the time of the Miss USA pageant)	Hometown	Local title	Placement at Miss USA	Special awards at Miss USA	Notes
2026	Ellise Kakazu	35	Pearl City, HI	Miss Hawaii Kai			
2025	Carisa Erickson	38	Seattle	Miss Columbia Basin			
2024	Tiffany Rea	27	Clarkston	Miss Clarkston			Previously Miss United States 2020
2023	Samantha Gallia	24	Seattle	Miss King County	Top 20		First dentist to ever compete at Miss USA; an oral and maxillofacial radiology resident at the University of Washington at the time of crowning
2022	Mazzy Eckel	21	Seattle				Eligible as a student of Seattle University at the time of crowning
2021	Christine Brodie	25	Seattle				
2020	Imani Blackmon	24	Tacoma			Miss Congeniality	Previously Miss Washington Teen USA 2013
2019	Evelyn Clark	27	Cathlamet				Competed at the state pageant in the Miss USA system on her 8th consecutive attempt, including top 5 placements in Miss Washington USA and Miss Oregon USA
2018	Abigail Hill	19	Enumclaw				
2017	Alex Carlson-Helo	22	Bothell				Previously Miss Washington Teen USA 2012
2016	Kelsey Schmidt	26	Bellevue				Originally first runner-up, assumed the title after Stormy Keffeler resigned the title in January 2016
2016	Stormy Keffeler	23	Redmond		did not compete		Former Seattle Mist player; Keffeler resigned the title due to having failed to disclose a DUI conviction from April 2015.
2015	McKenzie Novell	23	Spokane				Top 10 at Miss Washington 2013 as Miss Tahoma and top 10 at Miss Washington 2012 as Miss Spokane
2014	Allyson Rowe	25	Spokane				
2013	Cassandra Searles	24	Redmond				
2012	Christina Clarke	22	Snohomish				
2011	Angelina Kayyalaynen	20	Orchards				Born in Ukrainian SSR, in what was then part of Soviet Union
2010	Tracy Turnure	23	Seattle				Twin sister of Miss Washington USA 2009
2009	Tara Turnure	22	Seattle				Twin sister of Miss Washington USA 2010
2008	Michelle Font	26	Renton				
2007	LeiLani Jones	24	Tacoma				
2006	Tiffany Doorn	24	Woodinville				
2005	Amy Crawford	25	Auburn				Top 10 at National Sweetheart 2001
2004	Tara McCormick	24	Seattle		Top 15		
2003	Breann Parriott	25	Puyallup			Miss Congeniality	Previously Miss Washington 2001
2002	Carly Shorten	18	Shoreline				
2001	Bre Sakas	24	Yakima				
2000	Jamie Kern	22	Des Moines				Contestant on season 1 of Big Brother, finished in 4th Place. Co-founder and CEO of It Cosmetics.
1999	Tammy Jansen	19	Bellevue				
1998	Natasha Vantramp		22	Puyallup	Top 10		Later CNN Correspondent
1997	Sara Nicole Williams	24	Tacoma				
1996	Staci Baldwin	27	Kirkland				
1995	Theresa Cox		Stanwood				
1994	Angel Ward		Seattle				
1993	Kandi Fletcher		Longview				
1992	Stinha McLynne		Redmond				
1991	Lanae Williams		Burien				
1990	Melissa Dickson		Seattle				
1989	Chiann Fan Gibson		Seattle				
1988	Sandra Kord		Seattle				
1987	Jennifer Doerflinger		Seattle				
1986	Jacqueline McMahon		Orting				
1985	Sherry Rials		Bellevue				
1984	Sue Gerrish		Seattle				
1983	Kathi Tucker		Renton		Top 12		Mother of Tucker Perry, Miss Tennessee USA 2010, who placed in the Top 10 at Miss USA 2010
1982	Jana Minerich		Seattle				
1981	Leila Wagner		Seattle				
1980	Janet Brown		Seattle				
1979	Tracey Goddard		Seattle		1st runner-up		
1978	Barbara Ann Bogar		Seattle				
1977	Ivy Lynn Reed		Lynnwood				Later Miss Washington World 1978 and contestant at Miss World America 1978.
1976	Norene Gilbert		Custer		Top 12		Represented Washington in Miss World USA 1974 did not place
1975	Cindy Baxter		Kirkland				
1974	Cheryl Rutledge		Yakima				
1973	Cindi Arnett		Bellevue				
1972	Connie Ambrose		White Swan				
1971	Christine "Chris" McComb		Bothell				Finalist at Miss Washington USA 1970
1970	Susan Hyde	20	Seattle		Top 15		
1969	Deborah Gieberson		Seattle		Top 15		
1968	Dorothy Catherine "Didi" Anstett	20	Kirkland		Miss USA 1968	Top 15 Best in Swimsuit	4th runner-up at Miss Universe 1968
1967	Diana Lee Bateman		Moses Lake				
1966	Sandra Carlile		Yakima				
1960–65	No national representative						
1959	Leah Robinson						
1958	Rose Nielsen				Top 15		
1957	Diana Schafer				Top 15		
1956	June Svedin				Top 15		
1955	Shirley Jean Givins	20	Seattle		Top 15		
1954	Darlene Shride	–		–			
1953	Nancy Petraborg	18	Seattle		3rd runner-up		
1952	Adele Slaybaugh	18	Kennewick				
