= Paul Jenkins (poet) =

American academic

- Occupation: Professor
- Writing career
- Genre: Poetry

Paul Jenkins is an American academic. He is Professor of Poetry at Hampshire College.

Jenkins received an M.A. and a Ph.D. degree from the University of Washington, Seattle. Before moving to Hampshire, Jenkins taught at Elms College and the University of Massachusetts Amherst.

== Bibliography ==
- Forget the Sky. Fort Collins, Colorado: L'Epervier Press, 1979.
- The Conservative Rebel: A Social History of Greenfield, Massachusetts. Greenfield, MA: Town of Greenfield, Massachusetts, 1982.
- Radio Tooth. New York: Four Way, 1997. ISBN 1-884800-11-4
- Six Small Fires. New York: Four Way, 2002. ISBN 1-884800-33-5
