= Alexia Robinson (Miss United States) =

American beauty pageant titleholder

Alexia Robinson is an American beauty pageant titleholder] from St. Louis, Missouri who won Miss United States 2019. She was one of six African-American beauty pageant competitors to win major titles in 2019. Robinson is an advocate for domestic violence awareness. She has previously competed for Miss Missouri USA.

Awards and achievements
Preceded by Andromeda Peters	Miss United States; 2019	Succeeded by Tiffany Ann Rea
