= Dorothy Anstett =

American pageant titleholder

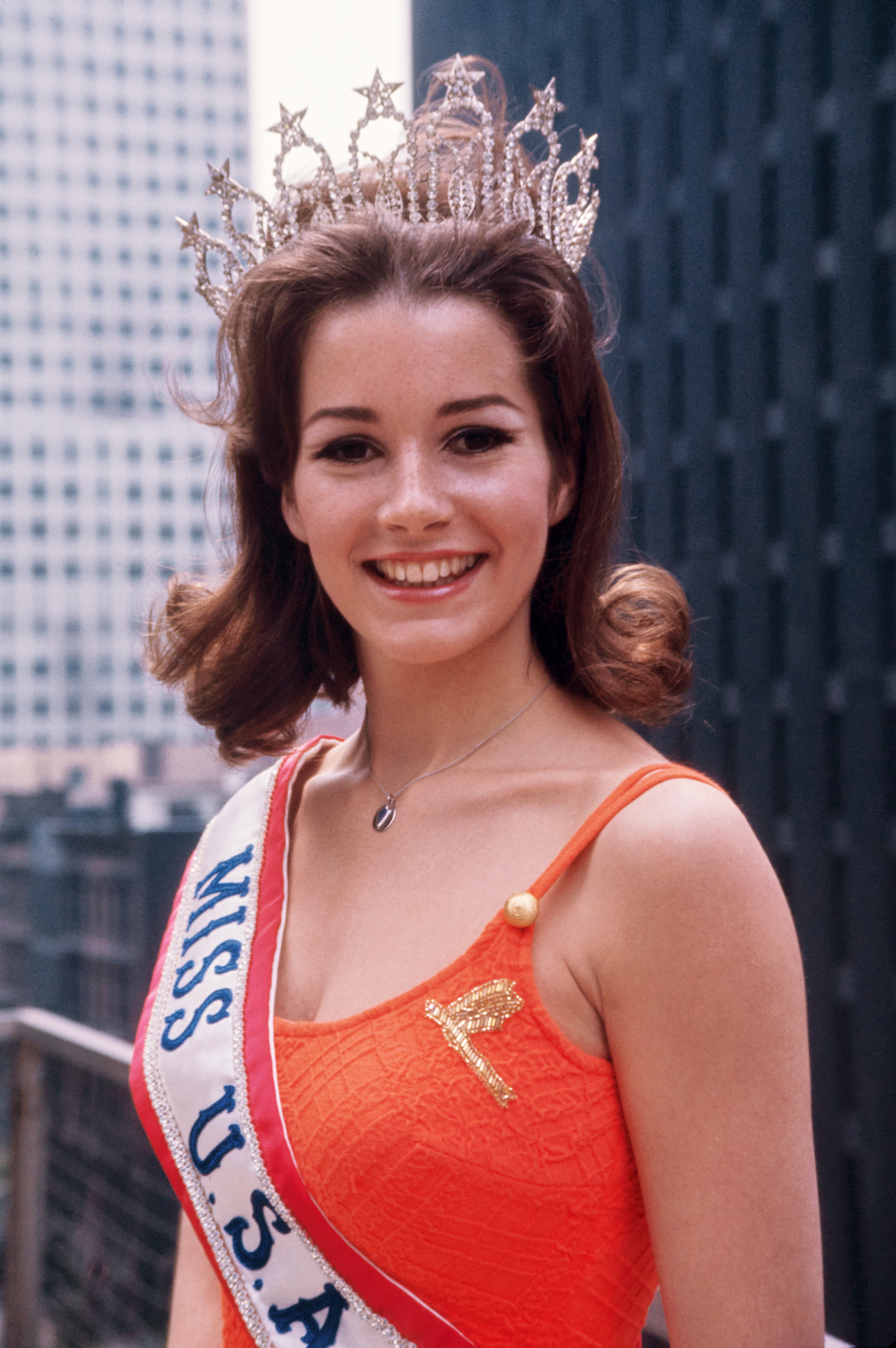
- Dorothy Anstett, Miss USA, 1968
- Born: Dorothy Catherine Anstett; June 28, 1947 (age 79); Kirkland, Washington, U.S.
- Other name: Didi Anstett
- Height: 5 ft 9 in (1.75 m)
- Beauty pageant titleholder
- Title: Miss Washington USA 1968; Miss USA 1968
- Hair color: Brown
- Eye color: Brown
- Major competitions: Miss Washington USA 1968; (Winner); Miss USA 1968; (Winner); Miss Universe 1968; (4th Runner-Up)

Dorothy Catherine Anstett (born June 28, 1947) is an American pageant titleholder who held the Miss USA 1968 title.

Anstett competed in the Miss Washington pageant in July 1967 and placed first runner-up. In April of the following year she won the Miss Washington USA 1968 crown title. She won the Miss USA 1968 title on May 18, 1968, and represented the United States at Miss Universe 1968 in July, where she placed fourth runner-up.

Anstett, one of nine children of an aircraft plant worker, was an English major at the University of Washington at the time of her win. She was married to legendary basketball player Bill Russell in 1977. They divorced in 1980.
