= Miss United States =

American beauty pageant

- Type: Beauty pageant
- Headquarters: Rochester, New York
- Location: United States
- Official language: English
- President: Tony Ilacqua
- Website: www.unitedstatescrown.com/divisions/miss-united-states

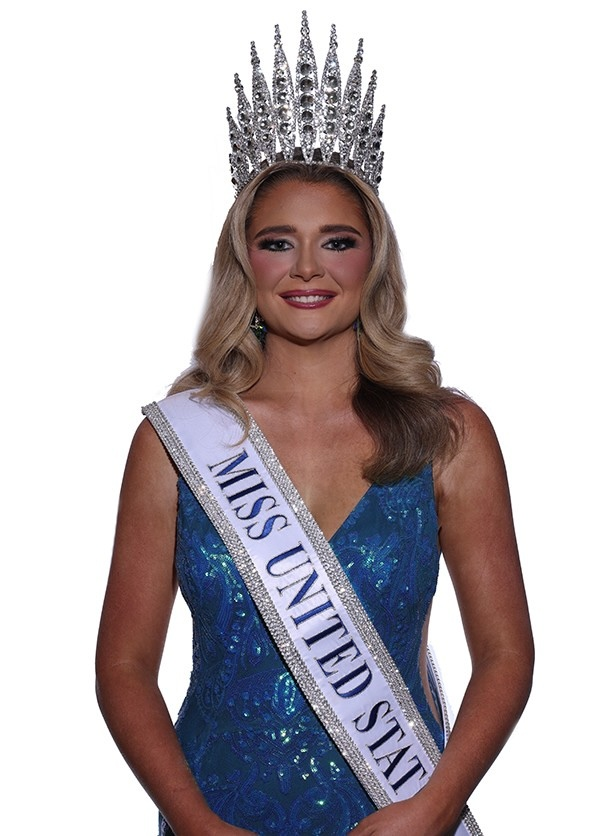
Miss United States 2025 - Madison Hickman

Miss United States is a pageant held in the United States for unmarried women between the ages of 20 and 29. The pageant includes women selected to represent all 50 states, District of Columbia, American Samoa, Guam, Commonwealth of the Northern Mariana Islands, Puerto Rico, and the U.S. Virgin Islands.

The Miss United States pageant's mission is to "celebrate intelligent women of all walks of life." The Miss United States pageant includes the following competition segments: Private Interview (a 3-minute private interview with judges about the delegate's career, academic, and charitable accomplishments), Evening Gown (a runway walk in formalwear to demonstrate the delegate's poise), Swimsuit (a runway walk in swimwear to display the delegate's physical fitness and on-stage confidence), and Personal Platform Promise (a 60-second 'pitch' of the delegate's chosen charitable cause followed by an onstage question). All four competition segments are worth 25% of the delegate's overall score.

Miss United States is part of the pageant system known as Mrs. United States Pageant, Inc. (DBA United States National Pageants) which has eight divisions: Little Miss United States, Miss Pre-Teen United States, Miss Jr. Teen United States, Miss Teen United States, Miss United States, Ms. United States, Ms. Woman United States, and Mrs. United States. United States National Pageants is the official and exclusive owner of the "Miss United States" trademark. In 2016, Miss United States organizers held the national pageant in Las Vegas, where it initially was held, for a 30th anniversary celebration. The upcoming 2025 pageant will be returning to Las Vegas.

The reigning Miss United States is Madison Hickman, who was crowned on November 4, 2025 in Las Vegas, Nevada.

Notable recent Miss United States titleholders include Miss United States 2013 Candiace Dillard, who was a reality television personality on Bravo's Real Housewives of Potomac; Miss United States 2022 Lily K. Donaldson, who was the first Miss United States to visit all 50 states during her reign; and Miss United States 2014 Elizabeth Safrit, who also represented the United States at Miss World 2014 in London, England on December 14, 2014, where she placed as 2nd runner-up and earned the title of Continental Queen of Beauty of the Americas.

== Titleholders ==
Year	Miss United States	State Represented	Host city	Notes
2025	Madison Hickman	Texas	Las Vegas, Nevada	
2024	Lindsey Langston	Florida	Memphis, Tennessee	
2023	Addison Grace Hadley	Tennessee	Memphis, Tennessee	Hadley was previously Miss Mississippi US.
2022	Lily K. Donaldson	New York	Memphis, Tennessee	Donaldson was previously Miss Tennessee US 2021. She is the first Miss United States to visit all 50 states during her reign.
2021	Samantha Keene Anderson	Arizona	Las Vegas, Nevada	Anderson also held the following pageant titles: Miss Teen Arizona US 2014, Miss Vermont US 2018, Miss Virginia US 2019, Miss Arizona US 2021.
2020	Tiffany Ann Rea	California	Palm Beach, Florida	Rea also held the title of Miss Washington USA 2024.
2019	Alexia Robinson	Missouri	Las Vegas, Nevada	Robinson was one of six African-American beauty pageant competitors to win major titles in 2019, the others including Miss Universe, Miss America, Miss USA, Miss Earth USA and Miss Teen USA.
2018	Andromeda Peters	Virginia	Orlando, Florida	Later appointed as Miss Universe Ghana 2025.
2017	Rachael Todd	Florida	Orlando, Florida	Todd also held the title of Miss Florida 2010 (Miss America system).
2016	Alayah Benavidez	Texas	Las Vegas, Nevada	Later Miss Texas USA 2019.
2015	Summer Priester	South Carolina	Washington, District of Columbia	
2014	Elizabeth Safrit	North Carolina	Washington, District of Columbia	Miss World 2014 – 2nd Runner-up; *Miss Multimedia; *Top 5 Performing Talent; *Top 19 Interview Scores
2013	Candiace Dillard	District of Columbia	Washington, District of Columbia	Previously appeared on The Real Housewives of Potomac
2012	Whitney Miller	Texas	Washington, District of Columbia	
2011	Ashley Smith	Virginia	Las Vegas, Nevada	
2010	Jessica Black	Georgia	Las Vegas, Nevada	
2009	Erin Grizzle	Georgia	Las Vegas, Nevada	
2008	Brittany Williams	Nevada	Las Vegas, Nevada	
2007	Ashley Kazian	South Carolina	Raleigh, North Carolina	
2006	Shannon Haggard	North Carolina	Raleigh, North Carolina	
2005	Nicole Falsone	Arizona	Los Angeles, California	
2004	Brandy Baham	Louisiana	Houston, Texas	
2003	Lacie Lybrand	South Carolina	New York City	
2001	Starla Smith	Alabama	New York City	Smith was also Miss Teen United States 2000. This is the first Miss United States pageant held by the current owners, Mrs. United States Pageant, Inc., and followed the release of the 2000 film Miss Congeniality.
Organizers of the pageant that chooses the U.S. representative to Miss World used the title "Miss United States" from 1958 to 1961 and the American contestant sent to Miss Universe was known as "Miss United States of America" from 1952 to 1962. From 1962 to 1999, the Miss Universe organization held the trademark to "Miss United States", but did not hold a "Miss United States" pageant, instead calling their representative to Miss Universe "Miss USA".
1940*	Barbara Dean	unknown	unknown	
1939*	Hilda Williams	Georgia	Virginia Beach, Virginia	
1938*	unknown	unknown	unknown	Several newspaper articles say that R.H. Thompson, promoter of the Miss United States 1937 pageant, would hold another Miss United States pageant along with a Miss Universe pageant during Labor Day weekend 1938, whether these pageants were actually held is unknown. One source says the pageant is to take place in Biloxi, and another says Thompson plans to hold the 1938 pageant in Miami, instead.
1937*	Margaret Smith	Tennessee	Biloxi, Mississippi	Women from 16 states competed at a Miss United States pageant held in Biloxi, Mississippi in September 1937; the contestants competed in a pajama parade, bathing suit parade, and talent contest, and Mississippi senator Pat Harrison crowned the winner. Smith received a crown, diamond-encrusted watch, and a trip to Hollywood as prizes. The pageant was held by promoter R.H. Thompson.
1936*	unknown	unknown	Idaho Falls, Idaho	The Post Register noted in an August 1936 article that "Miss United States" would be selected at an American Legion conference the following day.
1935	Louise Lyman	New York	appointed	Lyman (originally from New York) was appointed to be the United States representative to Miss Universe (International Pageant of Pulchritude) after she participated in Miss Europe 1934 as Miss Atlantique.
1934*	unknown	unknown	Miami	The Worcester Democrat noted in an August 1934 article that "Miss United States" would be selected at the national American Legion conference to be held in October 1934 in Miami.
1933*	Gene Handley	Texas	Big Spring, Texas	Miss United States and Miss West Texas were named in a 1933 revue held by the Big Spring Chamber of Commerce with a theme of "an imaginary trip to Mars". Handley is named in one source as the daughter of the pageant organizer, Mrs. Lee Weathers.
1932	Helen Cant	New York	Buffalo, New York	Held as part of the International Pageant of Pulchritude. Cant was selected represent the U.S. at Miss Universe 1932 which was held in Spa, Belgium.
1931	Anne Lee Patterson	Kentucky	Galveston, Texas	Held as part of the International Pageant of Pulchritude. Patterson was crowned as Miss Northern Kentucky.
1930	Dorothy Dell Goff	Louisiana	Galveston, Texas	Held as part of the International Pageant of Pulchritude. Goff was crowned as Miss New Orleans.
1929	Irene Ahlberg	New York	Galveston, Texas	Held as part of the International Pageant of Pulchritude. Ahlberg was crowned as Miss Greater New York.
1928	Ella Van Hueson	Illinois	Galveston, Texas	Held as part of the International Pageant of Pulchritude. Hueson was crowned as Miss Chicago.
1927	Dorothy Britton	New York	Galveston, Texas	Held as part of the International Pageant of Pulchritude. Britton was crowned as Miss New York.
1926	Catherine Moylan	Texas	Galveston, Texas	Held as part of the International Pageant of Pulchritude. Britton was crowned as Miss Dallas.
1880	Myrtle Meriwether	Pennsylvania	Rehoboth Beach, Delaware	The veracity of the 1880 Miss United States competition is contested.

*From 1933 to 1952 (with the exception of 1935), "Miss United States" pageants may have been held by different organizations across the U.S., but there was no centralized organization or trademark.

== In popular media ==
In the 2000 American comedy film Miss Congeniality, the FBI asks tomboy agent Gracie (Sandra Bullock) to go under cover as a contestant when a terrorist threatens to bomb the Miss United States pageant. The film also popularized the pop-culture phrase "she's beauty and she's grace" from the Miss United States song which has lyrics "she's beauty and she's grace, she's Miss United States."

== History ==
=== Rehoboth Beach 1880 pageant ===
The very first use of the title "Miss United States" allegedly goes back as far as 1880, when Rehoboth Beach, Delaware, held the first recorded "beauty pageant" in the United States searching for "the most beautiful unmarried woman in our nation" and awarding her the title of 'Miss United States'. Some attribute this 1880 pageant to P.T. Barnum, although, this may be confused with P.T. Barnum's unsuccessful effort in the 1850s to start a live beauty contest. Several sources, including PBS and the History Channel, cite Thomas Edison as a judge of the 1880 Miss United States pageant. However, the very existence of this 1880 pageant is contested.

=== 1920s–1930s ===
Many news articles about the current Miss United States organization cite the first Miss United States pageant as taking place in 1937 with the title being award to Miss California, however, other sources point to the first Miss United States title as being awarded in 1925 to Miss California. A 1937 Albuquerque newspaper names the 1937 Miss United States winner as Margaret Smith of Tennessee. One source says the pageant was put on hold during World War 1, and then re-established in 1937, however, the Boston Globe published a 1929 article naming Irene Ahlberg as Miss United States 1929 and Universal Newsreel footage from 1931 shows Miss United States 1931, Anne Lee Patterson. Some of this confusion stems from the conflation of the original Miss Universe (International Pageant of Pulchritude) which also selected a 'Miss United States' and the modern Miss Universe pageant which began in 1952 and where from 1952 to 1961, the U.S. representative was called 'Miss United States of America' before the title was renamed to 'Miss USA' in 1962. The International Pageant of Pulchritude, which existed from 1920 to 1935, was the first international beauty pageant and crowned both a 'Miss United States' and 'Miss Universe'.

Additionally, national "Miss United States" pageants were held after 1935 by several different entities across the United States including American Legion auxiliaries and Biloxi event promoter R.H. Thompson. Patriotic festivals/parades also often had a young woman play "Miss United States" for the festivities, unrelated to a pageant or competition.

=== 1950s–1990s ===
The title "Miss United States" was trademarked by Catalina Swimwear (which founded the Miss USA and Miss Universe pageants) in 1957. Catalina Swimwear's competitions, which began in 1952, included both "Miss Universe" and "Miss United States of America", which would be renamed to "Miss USA" in 1962. The "Miss United States" trademark was then transferred in accordance with the change of Miss USA ownership, including to Donald Trump's pageant business "Trump Pageants, L.P." in 1996 and to the Miss Universe organization in 1997, although the pageant never used the title "Miss United States" or "Miss United States of America" after 1962. Organizers of the pageant that chooses the U.S. representative to Miss World used the title "Miss United States" from 1958 to 1961.

=== 2000s–current ===
In December 2000 (one year after the expiration of the 'Miss United States' trademark), the film Miss Congeniality (which was centered around a 'Miss United States' pageant) was released grossing $212 million worldwide against its $45 million budget. The following year, Mrs. United States Pageant, Inc. (who previously held 'Mrs. United States' and 'Miss Teen United States' pageants) held a "Miss United States" pageant for the first time, with their former Miss Teen United States, Starla Smith, taking the crown. Mrs. United States Pageant, Inc. currently owns the "Miss United States" trademark which was applied for in 2005, and registered in 2008. In 2012, the Mrs. United States Pageant, Inc. sued organizers of a "Miss United States of America" pageant for trademark infringement, and won.

The "Miss United States" pageant is held annually alongside the corporation's Little Miss United States, Miss Pre-Teen United States, Miss Jr. Teen United States, Miss Teen United States, Ms. United States, Ms. Woman United States, and Mrs. United States pageants.

== Gallery of Past Titleholders ==
Gallery of Miss United States Titleholders
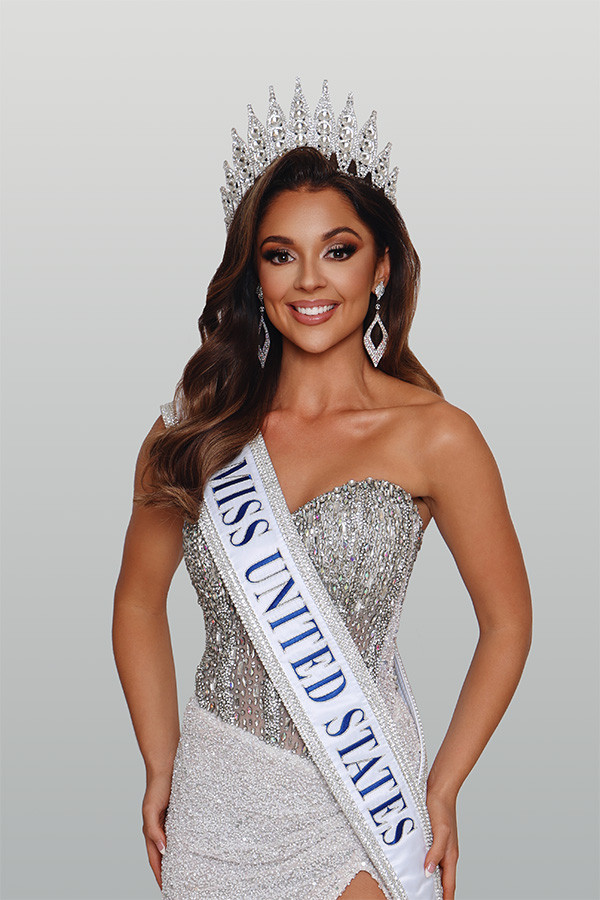
2024 – Lindsey Langston

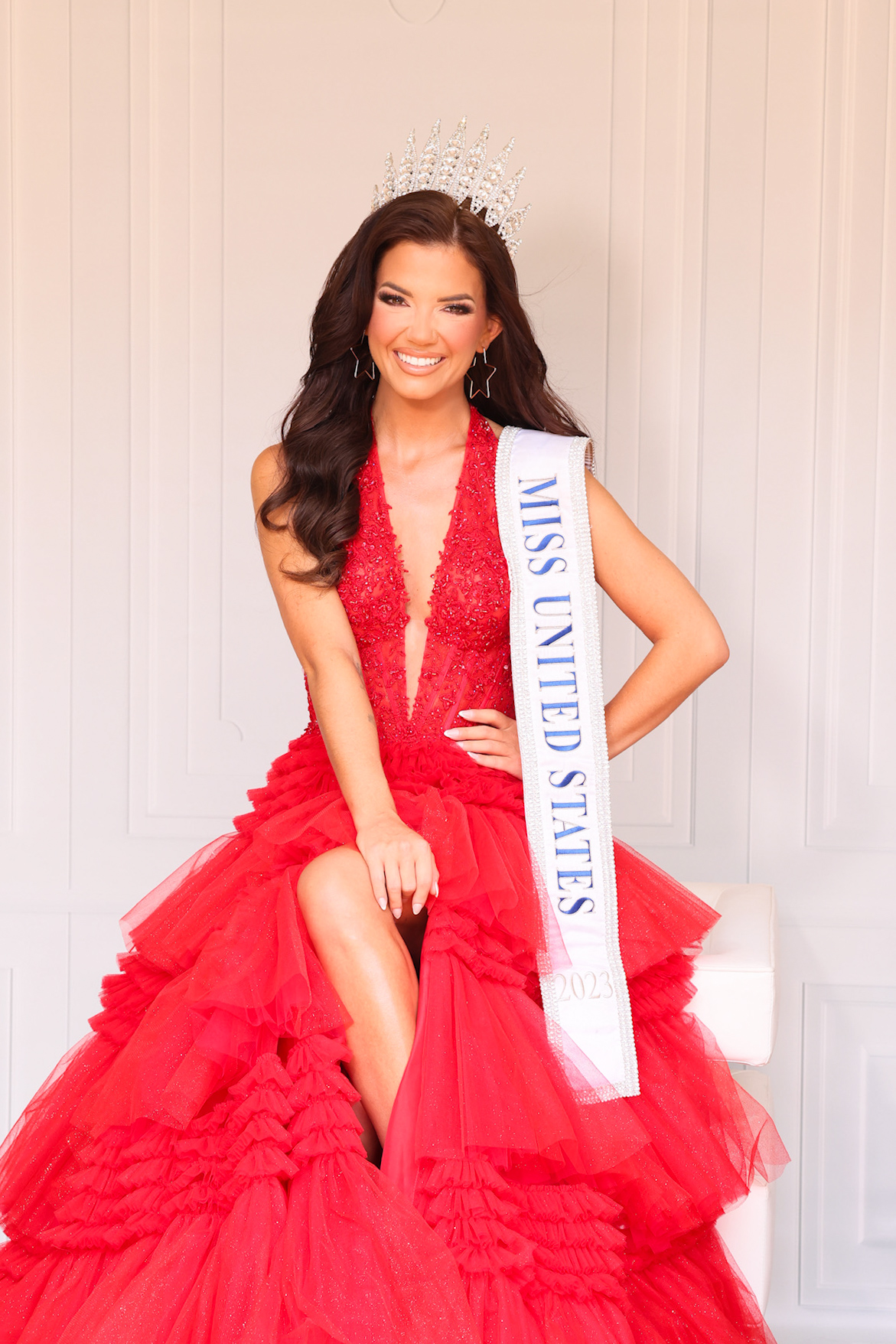
2023 – Addison Grace Hadley

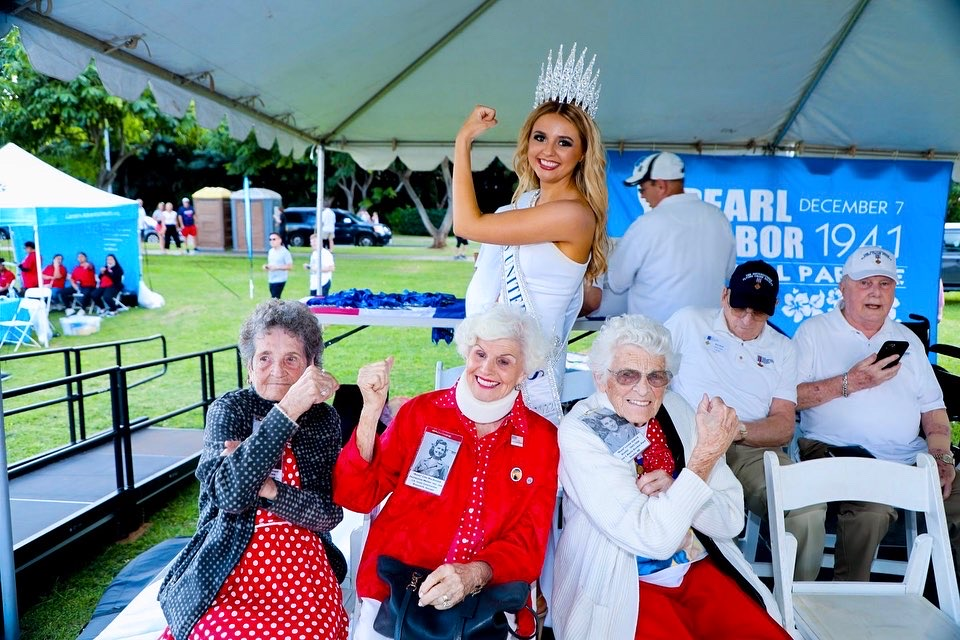
2022 – Lily K. Donaldson, at the 2022 Pearl Harbor Memorial Parade

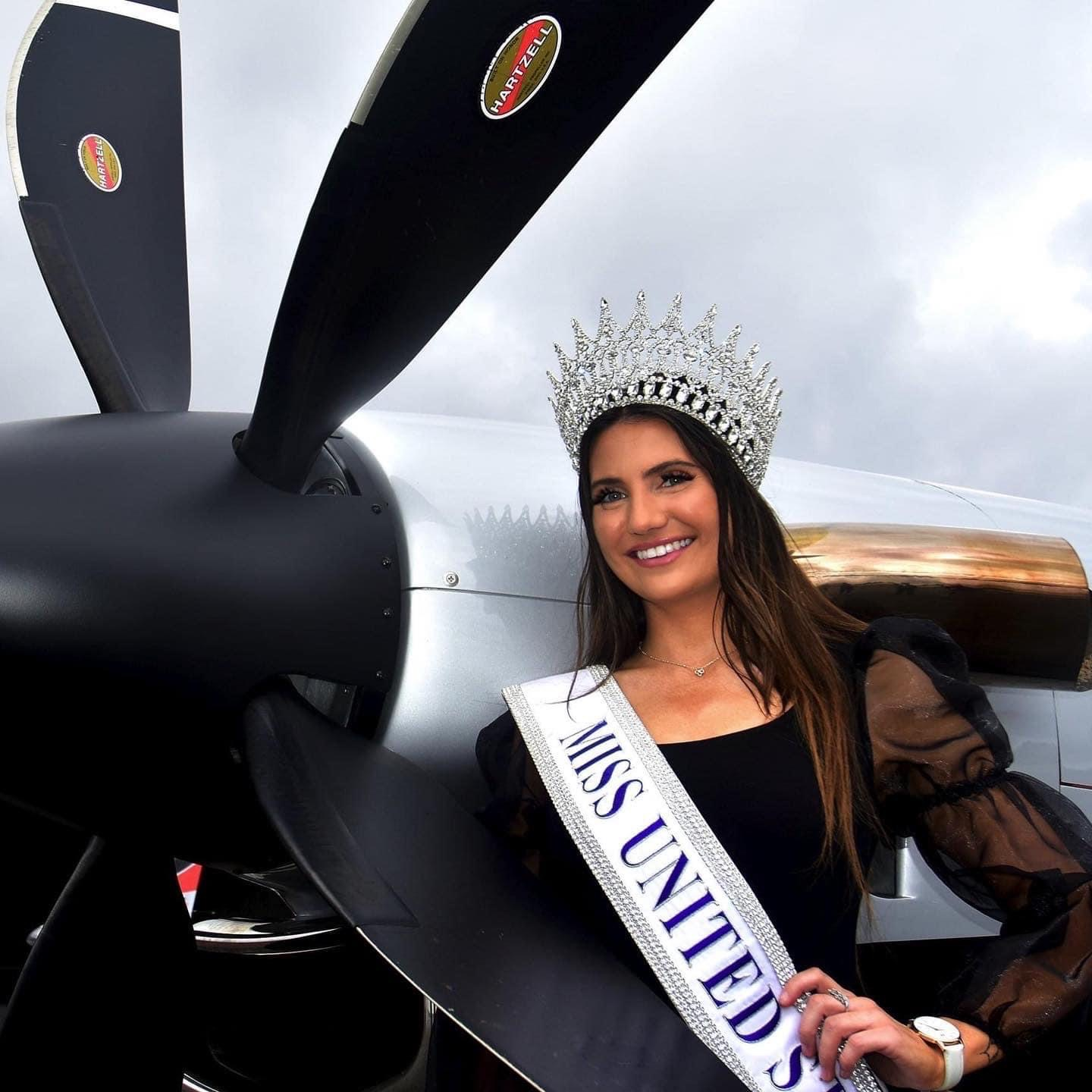
2021 – Samantha Keene Anderson

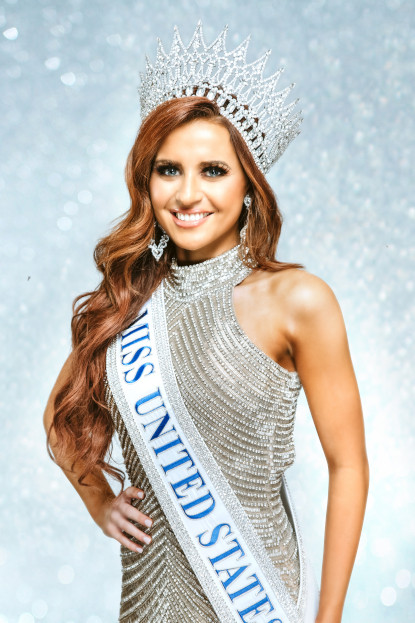
2020 – Tiffany Ann Rea

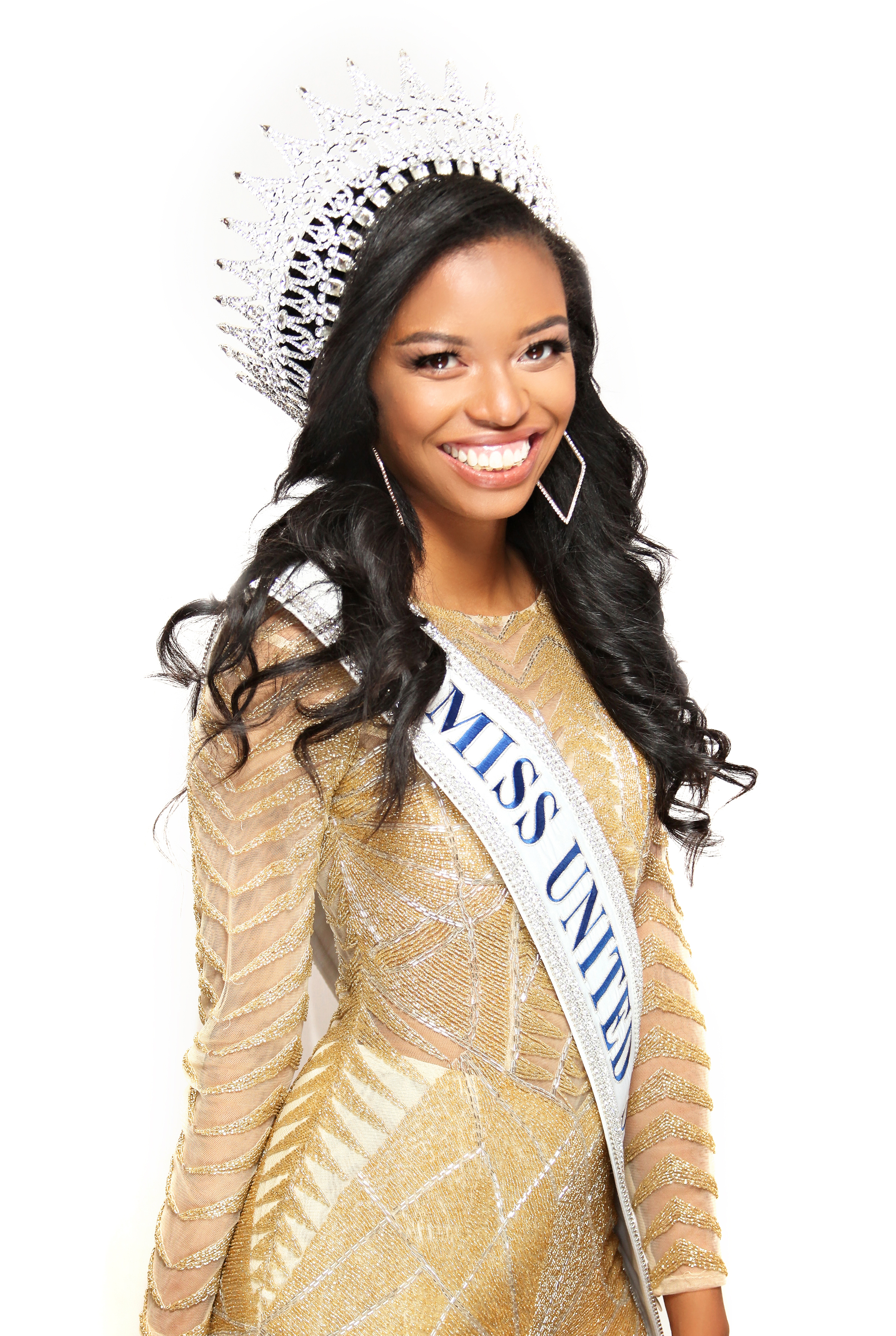
2019 – Alexia Robinson

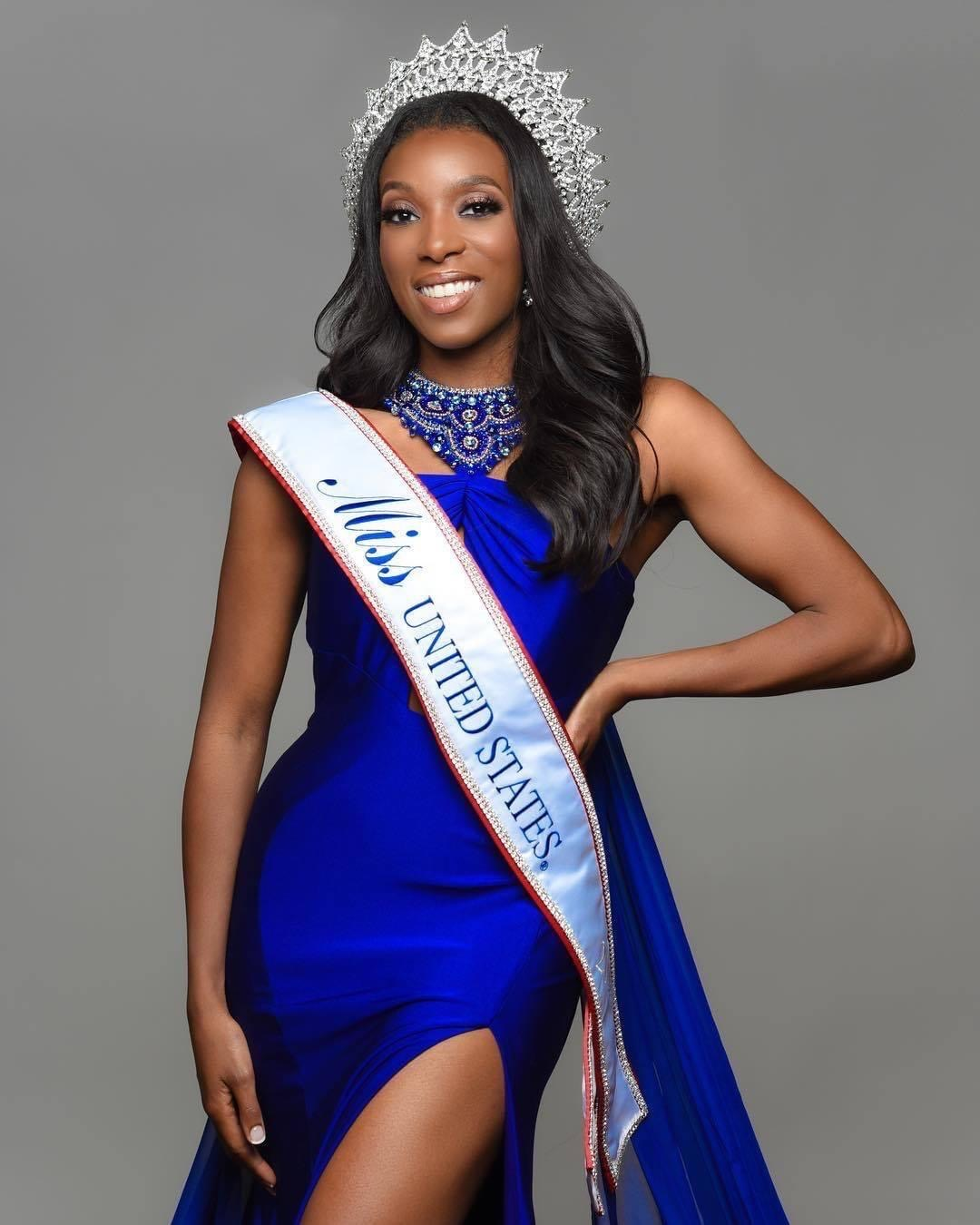
2018 – Andromeda Peters

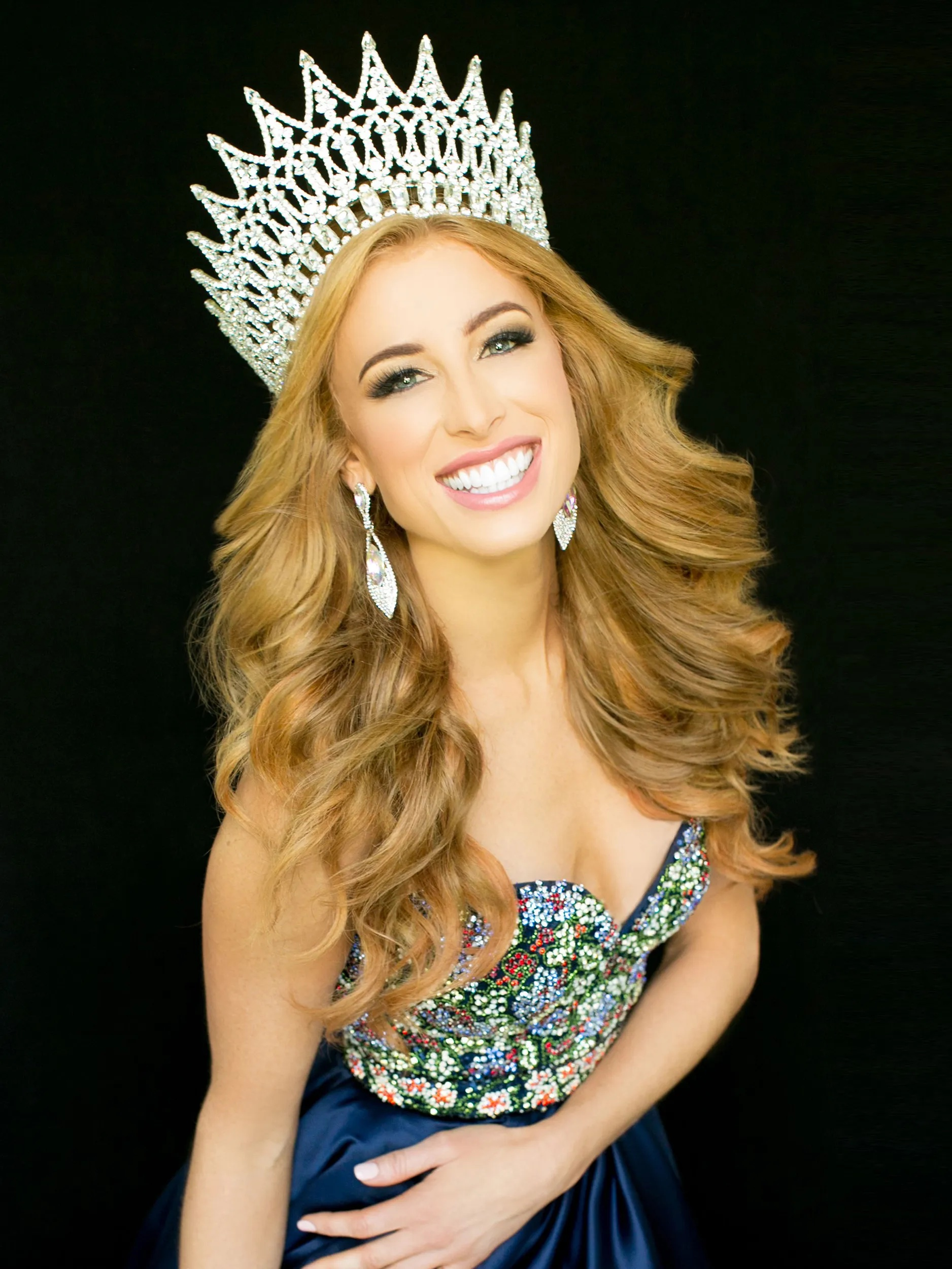
2017 – Rachael Todd

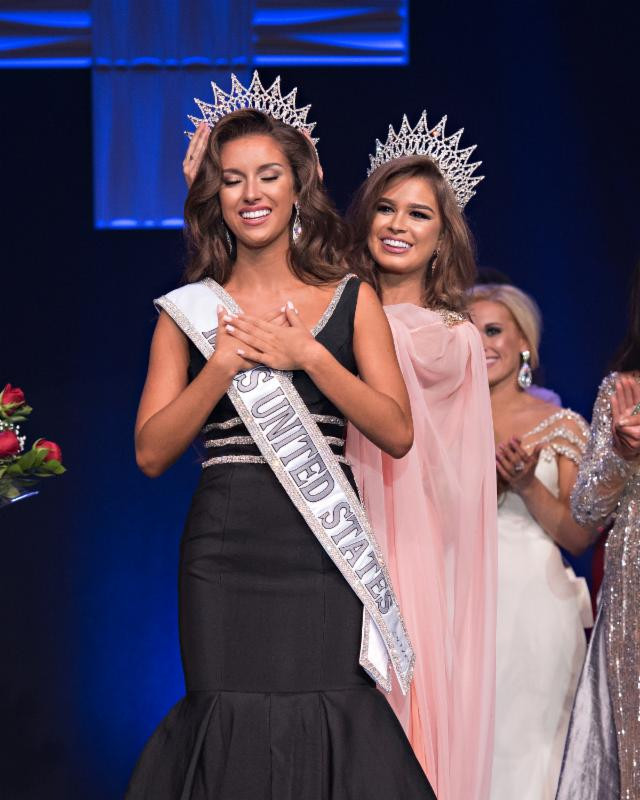
2015 – Summer Priester, crowning Alayah Benavidez in 2016

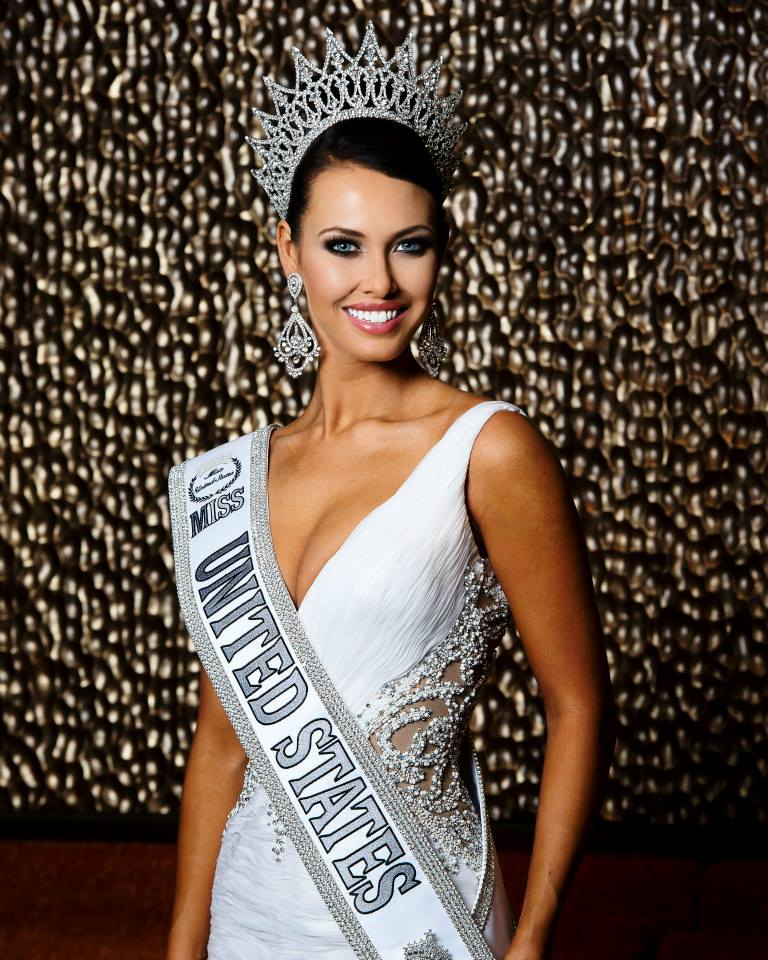
2014 – Elizabeth Safrit

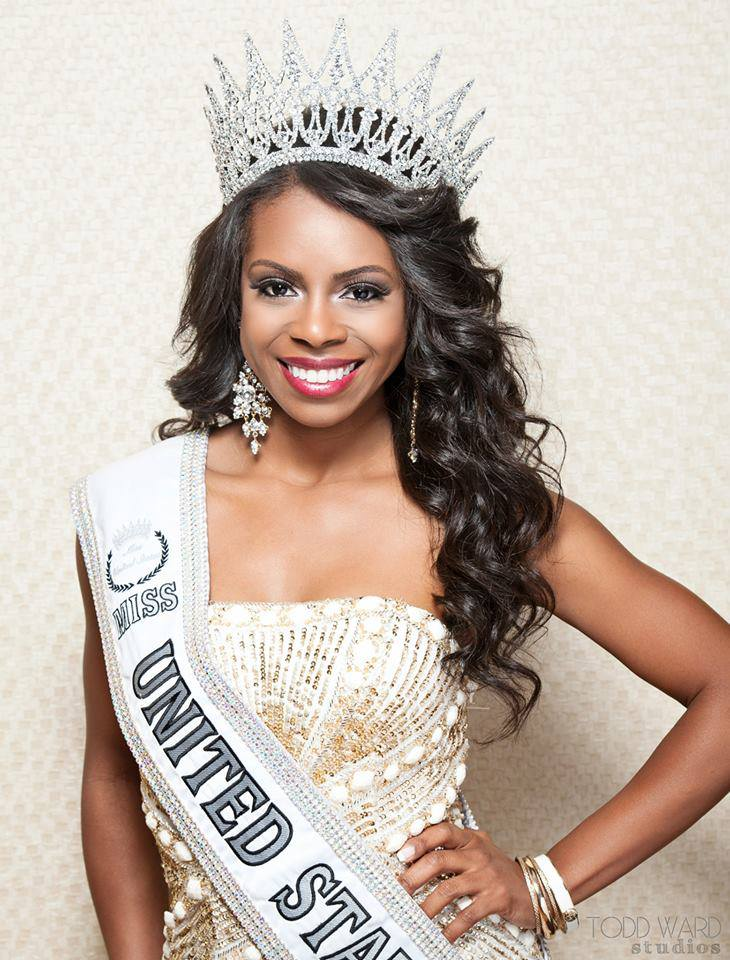
2013 – Candiace Dillard Bassett

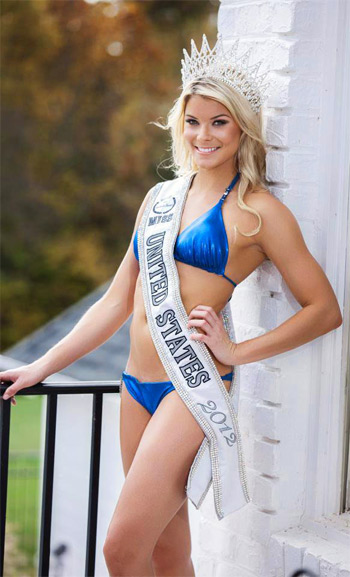
2012 – Whitney Miller
