= Injury-induced stem-cell niche =

An injury-induced stem-cell niche is a cellular microenvironments generated during tissue injury. These environments are triggered by injury and the local responses of support cells, and enable the possibility of repair by endogenous or transplanted neural stem cells. These environments have been demonstrated in several injury models, most notable in the CNS. The term was coined by Jaime Imitola and Evan Y. Snyder when they demonstrated that astrocytes and endothelial cells during stroke are able to create a permissive environment for neural regeneration, that is most striking for exogenous transplanted neural stem cells. Previous work by the Snyder Laboratory have shown that the interactions between NSCs and local cells is reciprocal, underlying a bystander beneficial effect of neural stem cells without neural differentiation, once thought to be the only mechanism for therapeutical benefit of stem cells in CNS injury.

More recently these findings have been reproduced and extended by others to different models of CNS injury, such as experimental autoimmune encephalomyelitis (EAE), a model of Multiple sclerosis, where transplanted neural stem cells persisted undifferentiated in perivascular areas, also called atypical stem cell niches, work that was done by Gianvito Martino and Stefano Pluchino.

== See also ==
- Induced pluripotent stem cell
