= Jaime Imitola =

American neuroscientist and immunologist

- Born: Barranquilla, Colombia
- Citizenship: United States
- Known for: Stem cells and multiple sclerosis research
- Awards: John N. Whitaker
- Scientific career
- Fields: Stem cells Neuroscience; Computational biology Neuroimmunology; Medical genetics
- Workplaces: Harvard University; Harvard Medical School

Jaime Imitola is an American neuroscientist, neurologist and immunologist. Imitola's clinical and research program focuses on Progressive Multiple Sclerosis and the molecular and cellular mechanisms of neurodegeneration and repair in humans. His research includes the translational neuroscience of neural stem cells into patients. Imitola is known for his discoveries on the intrinsic immunology of neural stem cells, the impact of inflammation in the endogenous neural stem cell in multiple sclerosis, and the ethical implications of stem cell tourism in neurological diseases.

== Early life and education ==
Imitola earned his M.D. degree from the University of Cartagena in 1993. He went on to receive postdoctoral training at Harvard University, Imitola completed postdoctoral fellowships at Harvard Medical School in 2005 with Samia J. Khoury in collaboration and guidance from Evan Y. Snyder and Christopher A. Walsh in stem cell biology and neuroimmunology, later that year joined the faculty at Harvard Medical School as an instructor in neurology.

He trained at the Ann Romney Center for Neurologic Diseases at the Brigham and Women's Hospital at Harvard Medical School. Here, he studied the molecular biology of neural stem cells (NSCs) and neuroimmunology. As a faculty at Harvard University, and affiliate faculty of the Harvard Stem Cell Institute (HSCI), he established novel techniques in imaging to study the immunology of neural stem cells and microglia that lead to the discovery of the mechanisms of migration of Neural stem cells in Stroke and the alteration of neural stem cells self-renewal capacity in models of Multiple sclerosis by microglia activation. Imitola has authored more than 100 publications, abstracts, and book chapters in scholarly journals. His discovery of the molecular mechanisms of neural stem cells to CNS injury have been replicated by additional groups. Imitola is highly cited for his work in neural stem cells migration.

== Academic career ==
The mechanisms of how neural stem cells migrate to injury are critical to understanding repair. The role of the chemokines in the migration of stem cells was demonstrated in 1997 when it was discovered that bone marrow stem cells could migrate to the chemokine SDF-1 alpha. However, the migration of stem cells in the brain to injury was less understood. In 2004, Imitola and his colleagues demonstrated an inflammation-dependent mechanism for the responses of NSCs to CNS injury by astrocytes. They showed that the inflammatory chemokine Stromal cell-derived factor 1 alpha released by astrocytes during stroke was responsible for the directed migration of human and mouse NSCs to areas of injury in mice, creating Injury induced stem cell niches elucidated by reporter stem cells, as proposed by Professor Evan Y. Snyder to denote the regenerative (micro-environments) areas created after CNS damage and the ability to visualize these areas by using stem cells expressing reporter genes (i.e. LacZ).

This discovery paved the way for the study of the responses of endogenous neural stem cell migration in regeneration in other neurological diseases. The work has been extensively cited and reproduced by multiple labs, and firmly established chemokines as important modulators of migration of neural stem cells not only in CNS development but also repair.

Imitola has received awards for his research in stem cells including the John N. Whitaker, MD Award for Multiple Sclerosis research
