= SMART Team =

SMART (Students Modeling A Research Topic) Team is a science outreach program that allows high school students to work with a researcher to learn about a specific protein and construct a three-dimensional model of that protein. This program started at the Milwaukee School of Engineering (MSOE) in Milwaukee, Wisconsin and has partnered with researchers at the University of Wisconsin-Madison, Rutgers University and others.
