= Endeavorist =

American Internet company

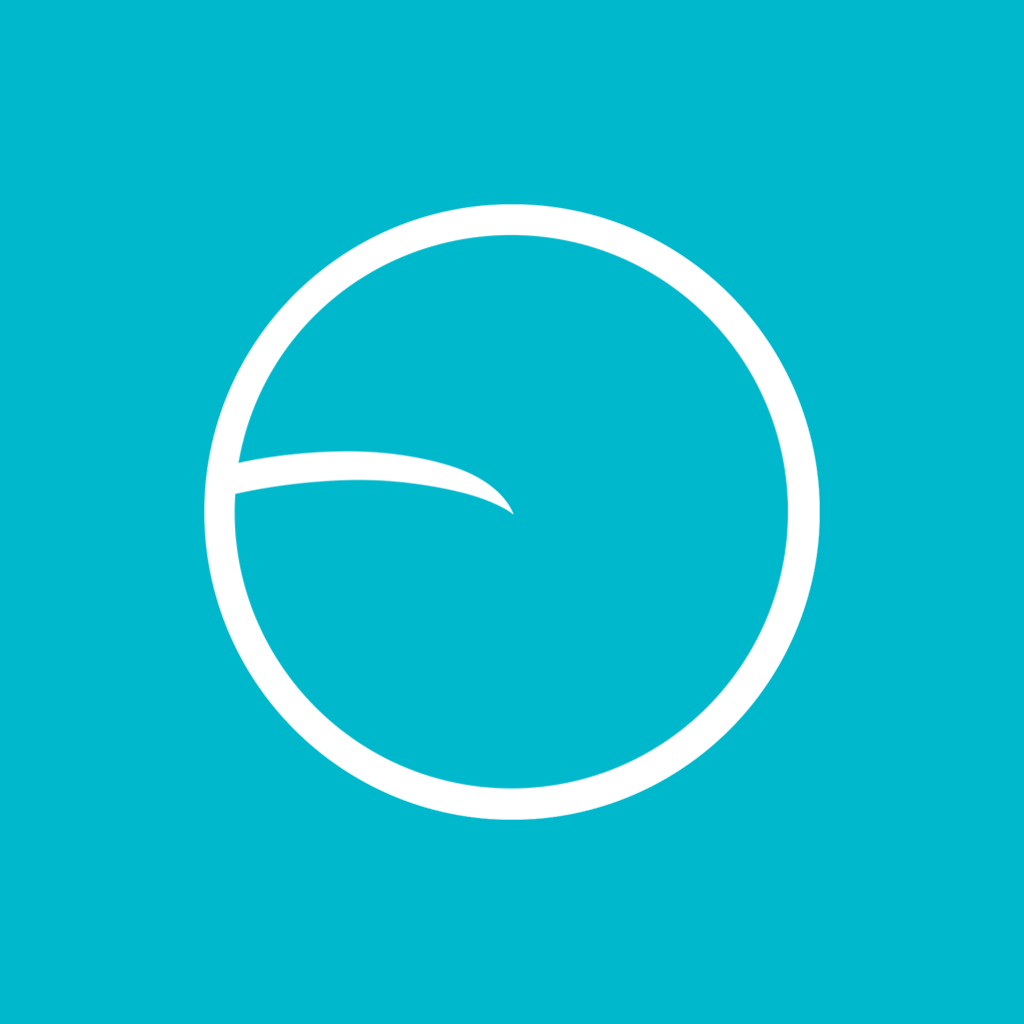
- Website type: Social networking, Crowdfunding
- Headquarters: Washington, D.C., {{{location_country}}}
- Website: www.endeavorist.org

Endeavorist (/ɛnˈdɛvərɪst/) is a science-oriented web application incorporating social networking, crowdfunding, and research collaboration services within a central "curiosity network". The platform is designed to increase public accessibility to scientific endeavors and products thereof. The stated mission of Endeavorist is "to democratize the pursuit of knowledge and drive scientific endeavor through human curiosity."

Endeavorist is currently publicly available as an open beta. The planned duration of the open beta period is unknown.

== History ==
Endeavorist, LLC was founded on April 24, 2012, in Fairfax Station, Virginia, a suburb in the Washington metropolitan area. The website remained in closed development for over two years before becoming available to the public as an open beta, launched on April 26, 2014, at the USA Science and Engineering Festival.

== See also ==
- Crowdfunding
- Open Science
- Basic Research
