= Science festival =

Festival for showcasing science and technology

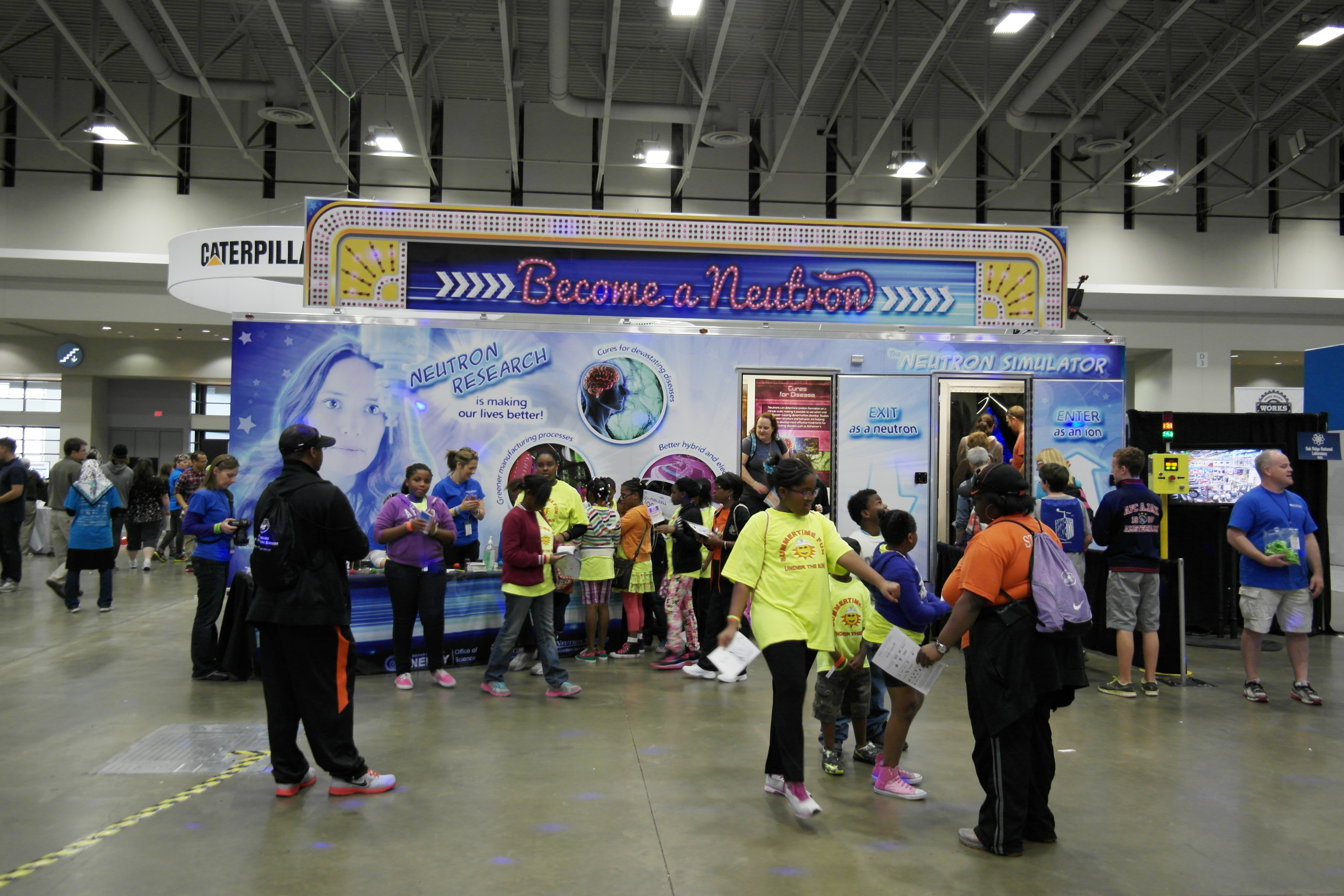
"Become a Neutron" booth at the 2014 USA Science and Engineering Festival

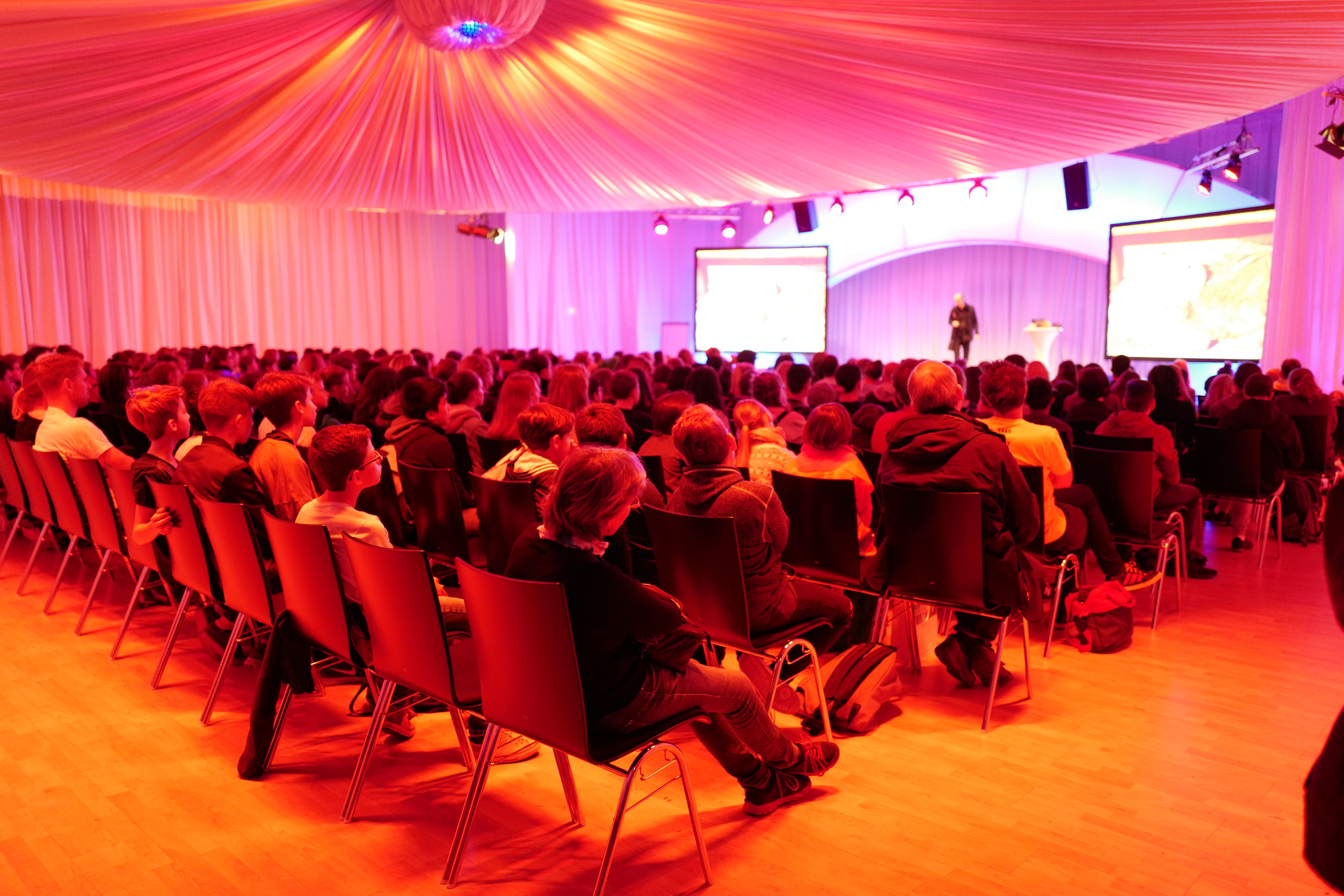
Audience and speaker at a Science Day event in Rust, Germany

A science festival is a festival that showcases science and technology with a similar atmosphere to an arts or music festival, and that primarily targets the general public. These public engagement events can be varied, including lectures, exhibitions, workshops, live demonstrations of experiments, guided tours, and panel discussions. There may also be events linking science to the arts or history, such as plays, dramatised readings, and musical productions. The core content is that of science and technology, but the style comes from the world of the arts.

== History ==
The modern concept of a science festival comes from the city of Edinburgh in 1989. The choice of Glasgow as European Capital of Culture for 1990 took Edinburgh by surprise and stimulated it to rebrand itself as a city of science, building on the success of a series of big urban developments led by its Economic Development Department. A senior member of the development team, Ian Wall, proposed that Edinburgh should highlight its new image by complementing its world-famous autumn arts festival with a new type of spring event for which he coined the phrase 'science festival'. Reaction was mixed, with some organisations doubting whether science could be packaged in an arts format. Even so, the city put resources behind the idea, appointing a director and project team, and in April 1989 the first Edinburgh International Science Festival took place.

Edinburgh's success led to the development of science festivals in many other parts of the world. The British Science Association restructured its annual meeting, originally established in 1831 as a discussion forum for scientists, to turn it into the British Science Festival of today. The town of Cheltenham—famous for its jazz, music, and literature festivals—added science to its portfolio with the creation of the Cheltenham Science Festival in 2002.

Realizing the key importance of science festivals science organizations and funding bodies put ever more emphasis on outreach to foster public understanding both of the results and the wider relevance of science. Recent years have seen the creation of a number of new science festivals as forms of public engagement. An umbrella organization for European science festivals and other science communication events, the European Science Events Association (EUSEA), was formed in 2001 and now has approximately 100 member organizations from 36 countries.

The concept spread to Sweden in 1997 with The International Science Festival in Gothenburg which is an annual festival in central Gothenburg, Sweden with thought provoking science activities for the public. The festival is visited by about 100,000 people each year. This makes it the largest popular science event in Sweden and one of the largest popular science events in Europe.

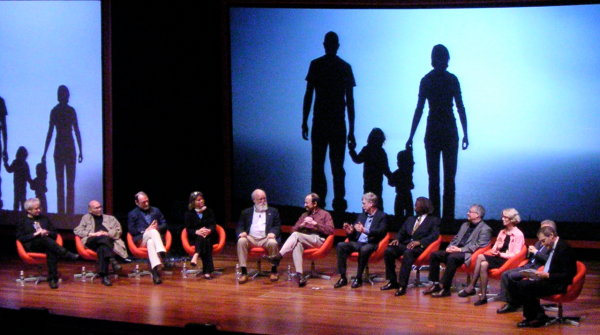
Panel discussion "What it Means to Be Human" at the 2008 World Science Festival in New York City

The spread of science festivals within the United States is relatively recent. One of the earliest examples is Wonderfest, an annual Bay Area science festival that began in 1998. Additionally, the annual meeting of the American Association for the Advancement of Science includes a number of public events. Focusing on one particular science, the physics festival "Mastering the Mysteries of the Universe", was held in Atlanta, Georgia, in 1999 in association with the centennial of the American Physical Society. Since 2004, there has been a science festival in Pittsburgh (the SciTech festival; from 2005 on known as the SciTech Spectacular), and new science festivals have been held in Cambridge, Massachusetts (the Cambridge Science Festival, first held in April 2007); and in New York City (the World Science Festival held at the end of May 2008); and in March 2009, San Diego hosted the first west coast science festival, the San Diego Science Festival founded by Larry Bock.

As of 2009 the Science Festival Alliance, a consortium of major festivals formed with a 3-year NSF grant, has supported the growth of independent regional science festivals, with an initial emphasis on celebration in communities throughout the US.

In September 2010, the North Carolina Science Festival became the first statewide science festival in the United States, presenting more than 400 events across the state over a two-week span. The second NC Science Festival was held April 13–29, 2012, and the festival is now an annual event. Morehead Planetarium and Science Center at UNC-Chapel Hill founded the North Carolina Science Festival and continues to administer it.

In late October 2010, the USA Science and Engineering Festival was the "country’s first national science festival". This national emphasis was based partly on encouraging local events to coincide with the major event in Washington DC.

Festivals can vary greatly in size, scope, and their overall purpose. Involved partners may have different aims, methods, and motivations to participate and deliver such festivals. A university might stage a small festival in its hometown. On the other end of the scale, the 2006 British Association Festival of Science held on September 2–9 in Norwich, England, was attended by more than 174,000 visitors.

== Typical festival events ==
Science festivals feature a wide variety of events. As they offer an enjoyable setting with social interaction, visitors tend to develop increased interest in curiosity about science, and also value the opportunity to interact with scientific research through different forms of public engagement. Those can include conventional methods of science communication found in science museums and centres. Differing from them in their focus on current scientific research and their temporary nature. Because of this, science festivals have high amounts of volunteering scientists, university students, technologists and engineers.

Science festivals are also aimed at playing an important, if informal part in secondary science education. Many have events specifically aimed at students or teachers, such as workshops or offering curriculum-linked workshops, and science shows to regional schools throughout the year.

A typical format for a science festival is to have a series of lectures, with topics ranging from cutting-edge research to unusual perspectives on science. For instance, the 2007 Edinburgh festival "Big Ideas" series included talks on what makes racing cars fast, the molecular basis of food preparation, the neurobiology of love and beauty, and the properties of quarks. Most science festivals include hands-on activities similar to those found in science centers. Another popular theme is the interaction of science and culture, including the arts.

Generally speaking, science engagement can be separated into three orders of engagement. Irwin's conceptional 'third-order thinking' model defines 'first order' engagement to merely promote science learning, and the overall awareness and interest of science. The 'second order' of public engagement describes two-way 'dialogue', where both experts and laypeople can learn from each other by exchanging knowledge and valuable information. Connecting the wider social context of techno-scientific advancements to social needs in defining a 'third order' of engagement, involving pluralistic debates and discussions on how science can best serve societal needs. Science festivals are quite unique for the opportunity to combine diverse engagement formats, covering all of the previously mentioned orders of engagement in an informal setting.

== Strengths & Challenges ==
=== Strengths ===
The strengths of science festivals lie in their unique role of creating strong and memorable impressions due to their time-limited nature and the variety of different engagement forms. Compared to science broadcasting, festivals allow visitors to engage in discussions with experts about more complex topics. This enables visitors to dive deeper into science, benefitting from their immediacy and interactivity, while scientists get the chance to enthuse them about their work and connect to a non-expert audience.

Far beyond just conveying information, science festivals provide visitors with the conceptional tools to understand scientific development in different areas of science. In addition, festivals are often perceived to be more open and honest about uncertainties in the nature of scientific processes compared to the 'ready made' contents from some public relations end of science engagement.

=== Challenges ===
Existing research does not always focus enough on the need to complement impact evaluation research on the effectiveness of science festivals with insights about visitor perspectives. Most attendees already share a significant interest in science or self-report that they are culturally active in general. Jensen and Kennedy suggest that science festivals face challenges in terms of reaching out to as wide a public as possible, being much more inclusive to the actual population. To foster socio-economic inclusivity, science festivals should be brought to the public through new creative ways, such as school visits - reaching diverse audiences with increasingly diverse backgrounds and previous interest in science.

== List of science festivals ==
=== United Kingdom ===
- British Association British Science Festival, England
- British Science Festival, Newcastle, England
- Caithness International Science Festival, Wick, Scotland
- Cambridge Science Festival, Cambridge, England
- Cheltenham Science Festival, Cheltenham, England
- Edinburgh International Science Festival, Edinburgh, Scotland
- Glasgow Science Festival, Glasgow, Scotland
- Manchester Science Festival, Greater Manchester, England
- New Scientist Live, Greater London, London
- Nottingham Festival of Science and Curiosity, Nottingham, England
- Oxford Science and Ideas Festival, Oxford, England
- Pint of Science, Bath, Belfast, Birmingham, Bournemouth, Bradford, Brighton, Bristol, Cambridge, Colchester, Coventry & Warwickshire, Crewe, Darlington, Dundee, Durham, Edinburgh, Egham, Exeter, Glasgow, Guildford, Hull, Kent, Lancaster, Leeds, Leicester, Lincoln, Liverpool, London, Manchester, Middlesbrough, Newcastle, Norwich, Nottingham, Oxford, Portsmouth, Reading, Salisbury, Sheffield, Southampton, St. Andrews, Stoke-on-Trent, Suffolk, Whitehaven, York

=== Continental Europe ===
- Science festival in Warsaw, Poland
- Lower Silesian Science Festival, Wrocław, Poland
- BergamoScienza, Bergamo, Italy
- Copernicus Festival, Kraków, Poland
- Festival della Scienza, Genoa, Italy
- Highlights der Physik, various cities, Germany
- The International Science Festival in Gothenburg, Sweden
- Uchenye protiv mifov, Moscow and St Peterburg, Russia
- Silesian Science Festival, Katowice, Poland

=== United States ===
- Bay Area Science Festival, San Francisco, California
- Los Alamos ScienceFest, Los Alamos, New Mexico
- Cambridge Science Festival, Cambridge, Massachusetts
- North Carolina Science Festival
- USA Science and Engineering Festival, Washington DC
- World Science Festival, New York City
- Michigan State University (MSU) Science Festival, East Lansing, Michigan

=== Canada ===
- Science Rendezvous, Toronto, Ontario
- Festival Eurêka!, Montréal, Québec

=== Australasia ===
- New Zealand International Science Festival, Dunedin, New Zealand
- World Science Festival Brisbane, Brisbane, Australia
- Sydney Science Festival, Sydney, Australia

== See also ==
- Science museum
- Science outreach
- Physics Outreach
- Public science
