= Renée Watson =

Renée Watson may refer to

- Renée Watson (author) (born 1978), American teaching artist and author of children's books
- Renée Watson (scientist), science communicator and entrepreneur
