= Science outreach =

Public relations by scientific organizations

Science outreach, also called education and public outreach (EPO or E/PO) or simply public outreach, is an umbrella term for a variety of activities by research institutes, universities, and institutions such as science museums, aimed at promoting public awareness (and understanding) of science, including trust-building, and making informal contributions to science education.

== Scope and history ==
While there have always been individual scientists interested in educating the public, science outreach has recently become more organized. For example, the National Aeronautics and Space Administration (NASA) now requires all of its projects to organize suitable outreach activities. Also working to inform the public are organizations such as Communicating Astronomy to the Public and the Washington Declaration on Communicating Astronomy to the Public that organize conferences for the public on science issues and make efforts to put outreach on a more general institutional footing.

Recently, an increasing number of projects have hired designated outreach scientists (part-time or full-time) that handle public relations for their project. There are also specialized outreach providers such as the Education branch of the Space Science Institute in Boulder, Colorado and the Education and Public Outreach Group at Sonoma State University which offer to organize a project's outreach activities on a contractual basis.

In addition to outreach by research institutions, an important part of informal science education are outreach programs such as science museums and science festivals.

== Activities ==
Science outreach can take on a variety of forms.

=== Public talks, lectures, and discussions ===
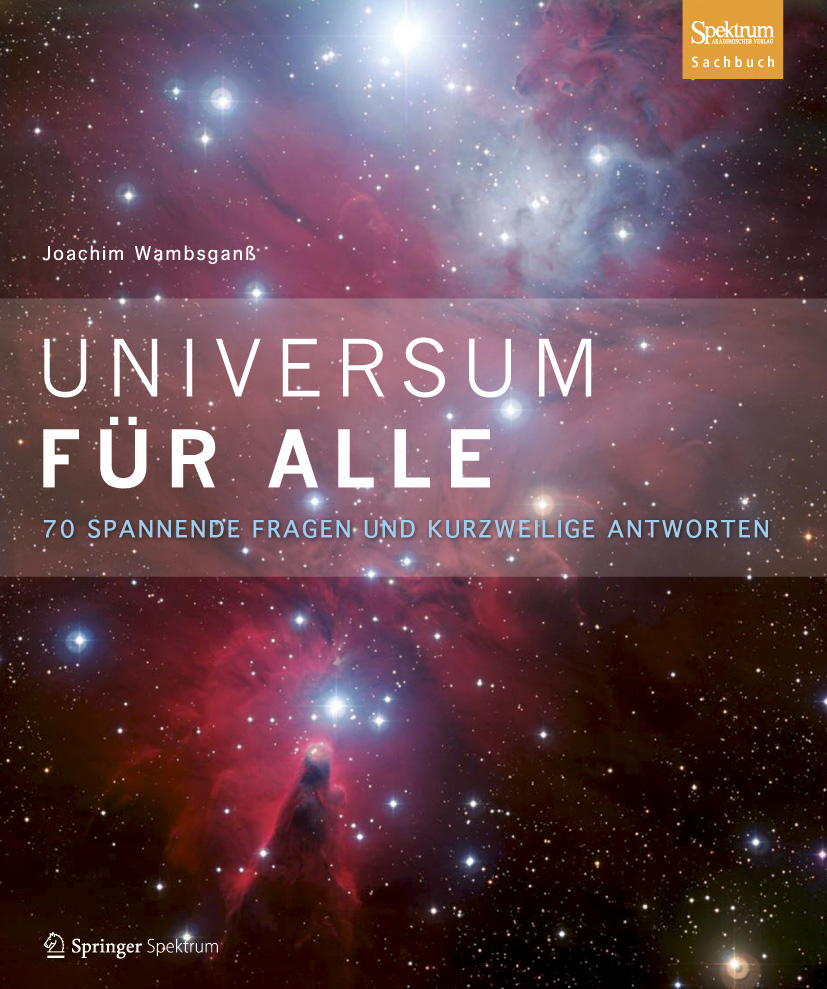
Universum für Alle: 70 short popular lectures at Heidelberg University, Germany.

Lectures are probably the oldest form of science outreach, dating back to the 1820s when Michael Faraday organized the first of the Royal Institution's Christmas Lectures.

Public talks can be part of a lecture series, given at a science festival or in cooperation with a special interest group such as a local astronomy club. Public presentations can have a variety of formats, including straightforward lecture formats with or without experimental demonstrations, guided live interviews, and discussions with several participants and a moderator. There are also less formal initiatives such as Café Scientifique, in which a café or bar is the venue for regular meetings involving guest scientists that come to talk about their work or take part in discussions with members of the public, and collaborations with museums

=== Visiting primary and secondary schools ===
School students and teachers are an important target group for science outreach. Outreach activities can include scientists visiting schools, giving talks at assemblies, discussions with students, or participation in events such as career fairs and science and technology camps. One organization that focuses on this kind of science outreach is Robogals. Many universities also have science outreach programs that are dedicated to building relationships between high school students, university scientists, and K–12 teachers. A few of the most prominent university science outreach programs include Carolina Science Outreach, the Vanderbilt Student Volunteers for Science, the Rockefeller University Science Outreach Program, the Present Your Ph.D. thesis to a 12-Year Old Outreach Project at University of Texas at Austin in Austin, Texas, the Present Your PhD graduate organization at Baylor University in Waco, Texas, the Discover STEM Polymer Day and Energy and U at the University of Minnesota, and the Stanford University Office of Science Outreach. Using Canada as an example, it has been estimated that with sufficient organization, every classroom from kindergarten through graduation could in practice receive a visit from one or more scientists annually with participation from only 10-15% of the scientific enterprise. Some examples of science outreach programs in Canada include: Let's Talk Science, Actua, The Chemical Institute of Canada, and Science Rendezvous.

=== Workshops and schools for teachers or students ===
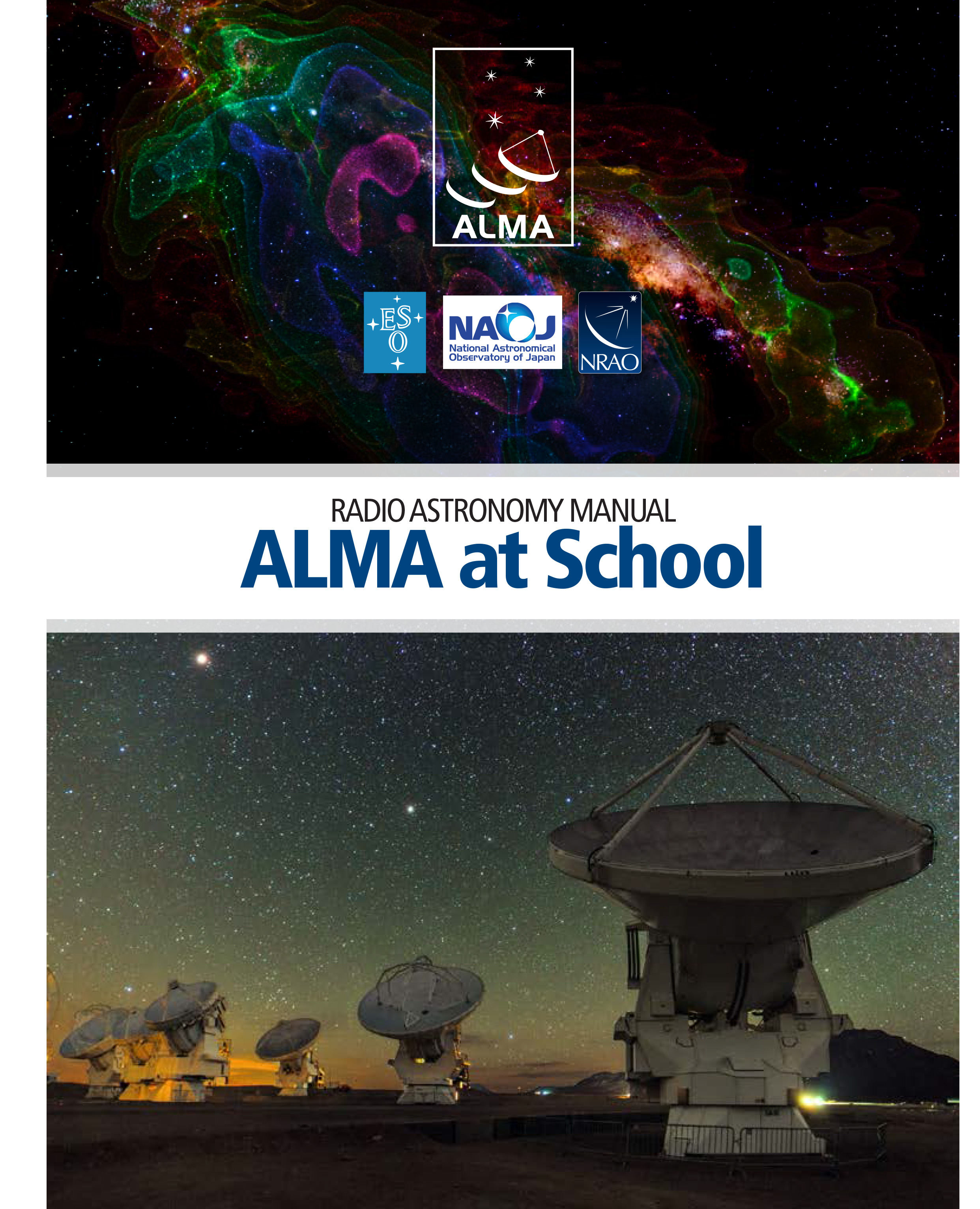
Cover of the ALMA radioastronomy manual.

Inviting groups of school students to a research institution for a workshop is another popular form of outreach. Formats range from a one-day visit to more involved week-long events such as Perimeter Institute's International Summer School for Young Physicists, a two-week-long program for a total of a hundred Canadian and international students from grade 11.

Another method of science outreach invites school teachers to participate in workshops where they are able to learn effective strategies to engage students in science. This approach was especially embraced by the Canadian Space Agency (CSA) which held an annual "Space Educators" conference up until 2012 to provides teachers with access to resources to educate their students in space-related science.

=== Supporting science fairs and similar events ===
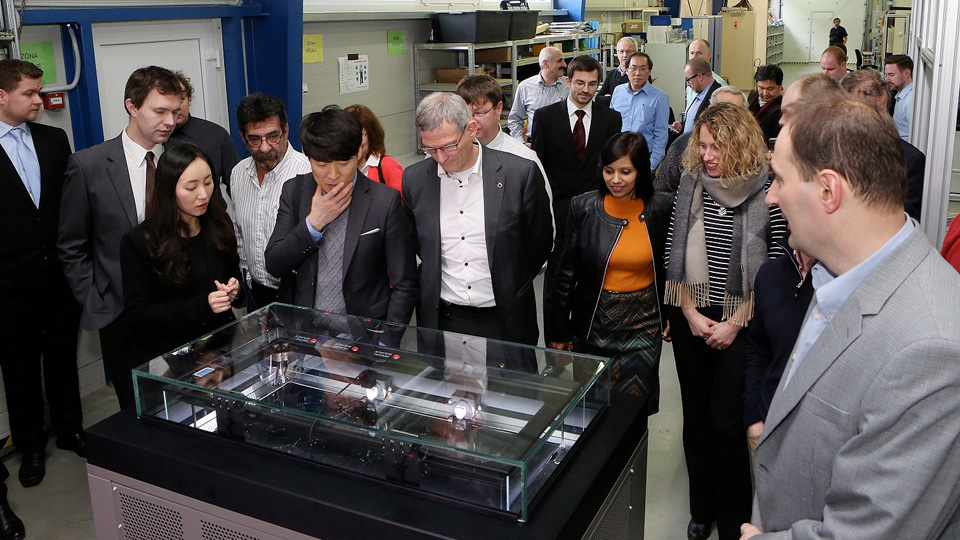
One of the major goals of science festivals is to make science more accessible to general public. Cloud chambers are popular at science fairs for their capacity to visualize the otherwise invisible radiation which surrounds us.

Besides organizing independent events, many outreach organizations sponsor existing events that promote sciences awareness. A notable examples are science fairs, public science events in which working scientists can participate both as judges and as sponsors of student projects.

=== Online aggregation of science activities, resources, and programs ===
The internet is a rich source of science activities, resources, and programs. For example, research laboratories often maintain educational outreach projects aimed at translating their science into something meaningful for the general public, often K–12 students, as an effort to increase research broader impacts required by funding agencies such as the National Science Foundation (NSF). These may include activities using fast-growing plants that exhibit distinctive mutants with unique phenotypes useful to teach K–12 students about both Mendelian and molecular genetics. Some institutions and organizations maintain large or small aggregations of their activity resources, outreach programs, upcoming events calendars, and partnering programs.

== Awards ==
A number of awards honor commitment to science outreach. Examples include:

- Award for Public Understanding of Science and Technology, American Association for the Advancement of Science
- Descartes Prize for Excellence in Science Communication, European Commission
- Michael Faraday Prize for communicating science to a UK audience (Royal Society)
- Communicator award, Deutsche Forschungsgemeinschaft
- Synapse Mentorship Awards, often given for exceptional contributions to science outreach, Canadian Institutes of Health Research
- Nicholson Medal for Human Outreach, American Physical Society
- Charles A. Black Award, for exemplary contributions to public understanding of food and agricultural science
- Kalinga Prize for popularisation of science is an award given by UNESCO since 1952 for exceptional skill in presenting scientific ideas to lay people

== See also ==
- List of Astronomy Outreach Resources in Europe
- Science Communication Observatory
- Science festival
- Science museum
- Scientific literacy
- Physics Outreach
- Popular science
- Public science
