= Stefano Pluchino =

Italian researcher

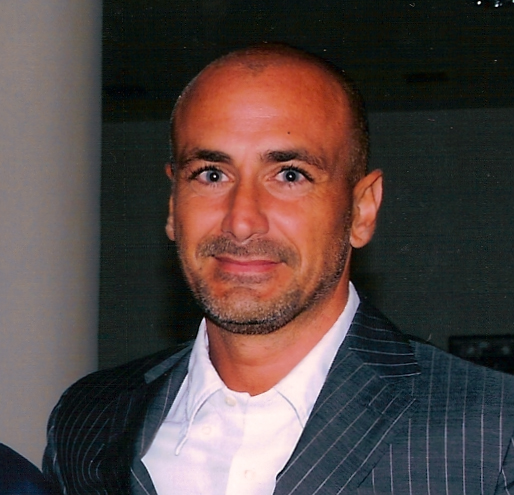
- Born: May 31, 1971 (age 55); Ragusa, Italy
- Education: University of Siena (BA, MD, PhD)
- Known for: Neural Stem Cells; Exosomes; Advanced Therapeutics
- Scientific career
- Fields: Regenerative Medicine; Neuroscience; Neuroimmunology; Advanced Therapeutics
- Workplaces: University of Cambridge
- Thesis: Development of a neural stem cell-based therapy for experimental multiple sclerosis in mice (2004)
- Doctoral advisor: Gianvito Martino

Stefano Pluchino (born May 31, 1971) is Professor of Regenerative Neuroimmunology, within the Department of Clinical Neurosciences, at the University of Cambridge. His research studies whether the accumulation of neurological disability observed in patients with chronic inflammatory neurological conditions can be slowed down using next generation molecular therapies. The overarching aim is to understand the basic mechanisms that allow exogenously delivered stem cells, gene therapy vectors and/or exosomes to create an environment that preserves damaged axons or prevents neurons from dying. Such mechanisms are being harnessed and used to modulate disease states to repair and/or regenerate critical components of the nervous system.

His research focuses on understanding and modifying the mechanisms underlying neurological disability in chronic inflammatory neurological conditions, with the aim of developing next-generation molecular therapies. His pioneering work established, through two landmark Nature papers, that adult neural stem cells (NSCs) could induce recovery in models of chronic multiple sclerosis (MS), laying the foundation for the regenerative neuroimmunology field. Since then, his research has delved into the mechanisms behind the therapeutic effects of NSCs, including their immunomodulatory and pro-regenerative properties.

Key discoveries from his lab include:

- Demonstrating how directly induced NSCs (iNSCs) respond to the immunometabolite succinate to suppress neuroinflammation, revealing a novel immune-metabolic crosstalk.
- Identifying mitochondrial complex I in microglia as a regulator of chronic CNS inflammation, providing a new metabolic target for neuroprotection and therapeutic intervention.
- Showing that iNSCs promote remyelination in chronic MS-like lesions by supporting endogenous repair mechanisms and directly generating myelin-producing cells.

His work on the interaction between stem cells and immune cells has demonstrated that advanced stem cell therapies exert their effects not only through cellular replacement but also via modulation of mitochondrial function and neuroinflammatory pathways. This perspective has inspired first-in-kind clinical trials of allogeneic neural stem cells in patients with progressive MS, including a pioneering Phase I trial demonstrating the safety and feasibility of intracerebroventricular NSC transplantation.

Further, his recent research employs advanced 2D and 3D stem cell models using patient-derived cells, revealing that neural progenitors from people with progressive MS exhibit a senescent, inflammatory phenotype that can be reversed with agents such as simvastatin. His lab also identified MS-specific epigenetic changes and a previously unrecognized population of immature, senescent, proinflammatory radial glia-like cells (DARGs), which spread inflammation and senescence, offering new avenues for personalized treatments.

Overall, Stefano Pluchino’s work integrates stem cell biology, neuroimmunology, immunometabolism, and patient-specific modelling to develop targeted therapies aimed at slowing or reversing MS progression. His insights into mitochondrial function, immune regulation, and regenerative strategies continue to shape cutting-edge approaches in neurodegenerative disease research with the goal of accessible, effective, patient-centred treatments.

== Education ==
Born in 1971, Pluchino grew up in Ragusa, Italy. He attended liceo classico Umberto I in Ragusa. He earned an M.D., a full residency in Neurology and a Ph.D. in Experimental Neurosciences from the University of Siena, Italy (joint with San Raffaele Scientific Institute, Milan), under the mentorship of Gianvito Martino in 2004. The title of his PhD thesis was 'Development of a neural stem cell-based therapy for experimental multiple sclerosis in mice'.

He then completed his post-doctoral research at San Raffaele Scientific Institute, and Vita-Salute San Raffaele University, Milan. He was also an instructor in Experimental Neurosciences at University Vita-Salute San Raffaele, Milan until 2010.

In 2010, Pluchino joined the faculty at the University of Cambridge – School of Clinical Medicine, with a laboratory at the Van Geest Centre for Brain Repair, on the Forvie site of the Cambridge Biomedical Campus. He became University Lecturer and Honorary Consultant in Neurology, as well as principal investigator at the Wellcome–MRC Cambridge Stem Cell Institute. He was promoted to University Reader in Regenerative Neuroimmunology in 2016. In 2021, Pluchino was further promoted to Professor of Clinical Regenerative Neuroimmunology, in the Department of Clinical Neurosciences.

== Research and career ==
Pluchino's research studies whether the accumulation of neurological disability observed in patients with chronic inflammatory neurological conditions can be slowed down using next generation molecular therapies. The overarching aim is to understand the basic mechanisms that allow exogenously delivered stem cells, gene therapy vectors and/or exosomes to create an environment that preserves damaged axons or prevents neurons from dying. Such mechanisms may be harnessed and used to modulate disease states to repair and/or regenerate critical components of the nervous system.

== Awards and honors ==
- 2003 AINI Award
- 2003 European Charcot Foundation (ECF) Award
- 2004 SIICA Award
- 2006 Serono Foundation Multiple Sclerosis Award;
- 2007 FISM Rita Levi-Montalcini Award;
- 2008 Regional Agency for Instruction, Formation and Work (ARIFL) Research and Internationalization Award;
- 2010 Royan International Research Award;
- 2025 UConn Health Petit Family, Distinguished Visiting Professor in Multiple Sclerosis and Neuroimmunology
- 2026 Elected Fellow of the Academy of Medical Sciences
