= New Zealand International Science Festival =

Biennial science festival in Dunedin, New Zealand

The New Zealand International Science Festival is a biennial science festival in Dunedin, New Zealand, which takes place over six days and involves talks, hands-on events, and presentations by international keynote speakers.

The festival was first held in 1998 and its aim is to celebrate, promote and raise awareness of science, technology and the environment. The festival encourages people and organisations (educational, research, business, and community) to participate in the promotion of their work in science and its applications and contributions to society. They also aim to highlight the excellence of achievements in these fields by Dunedin, Otago and New Zealand scientists.

NZISF staff produce the events, along with external event organisers, and a range of local and national sponsors and funders. Up to 40 individual volunteers help run festival events, and thousands of visitors from all over New Zealand participate. In 2023, 90 events were held at more than 50 Dunedin locations. Following the cancellation of the 2020 Science Festival due to the COVID-19 pandemic, the main festival alternated with a smaller week-long "Nano Fest" held every other year. The last Nano Fest, with 60 events, was held in 2026, by which time attendance had grown enough for a full sized festival every year from 2027. The 2028 festival is planned to coincide with the 22 July total solar eclipse in Dunedin.

Beside private sponsors, core contributors to the festival are the Dunedin City Council, The Community Trust of Otago, and the University of Otago. Children are one of the festival's key audiences. The festival is held during the winter school holidays, and most events for children are free.

2026 NZISF Festival Hub

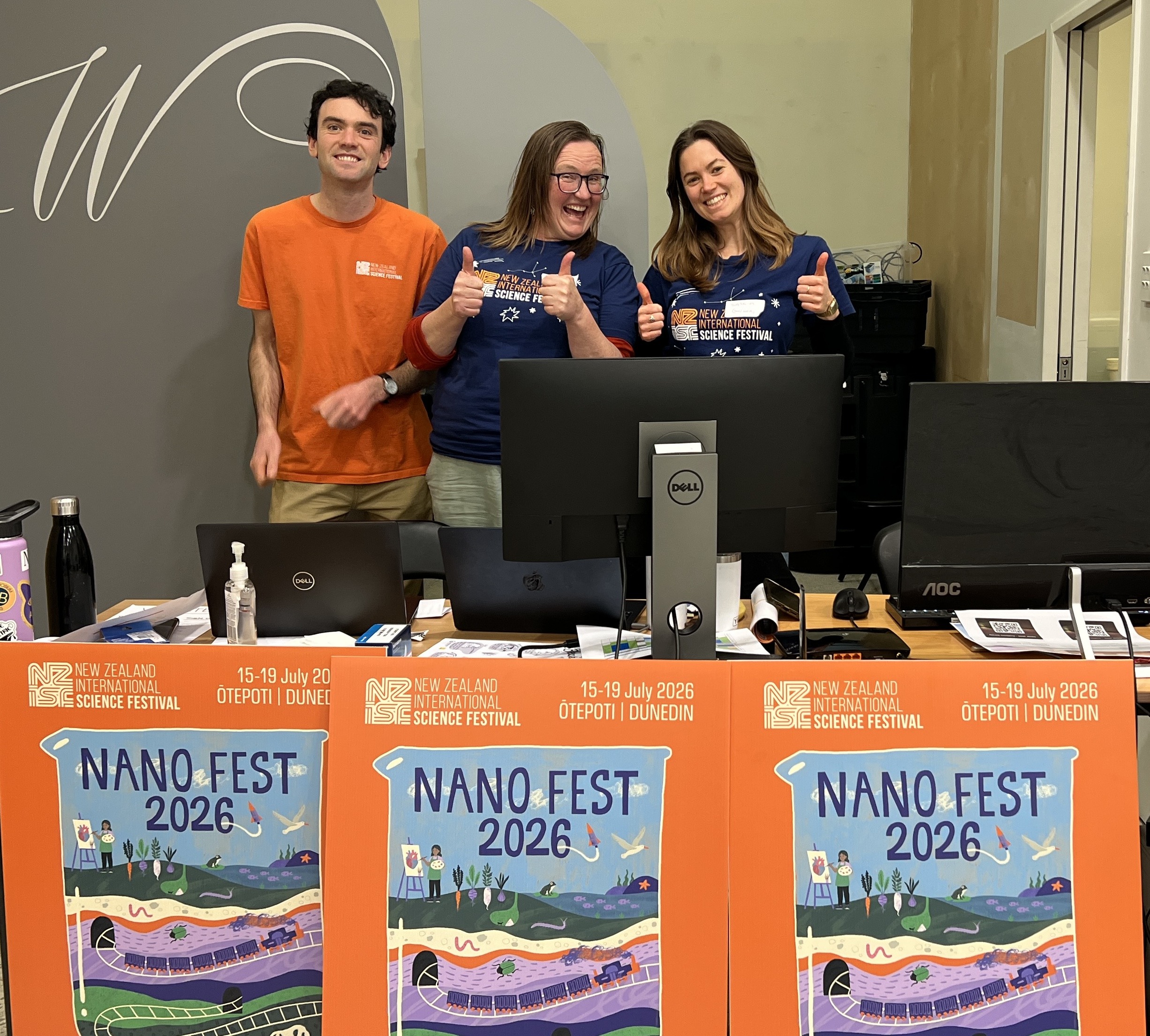
Organisers

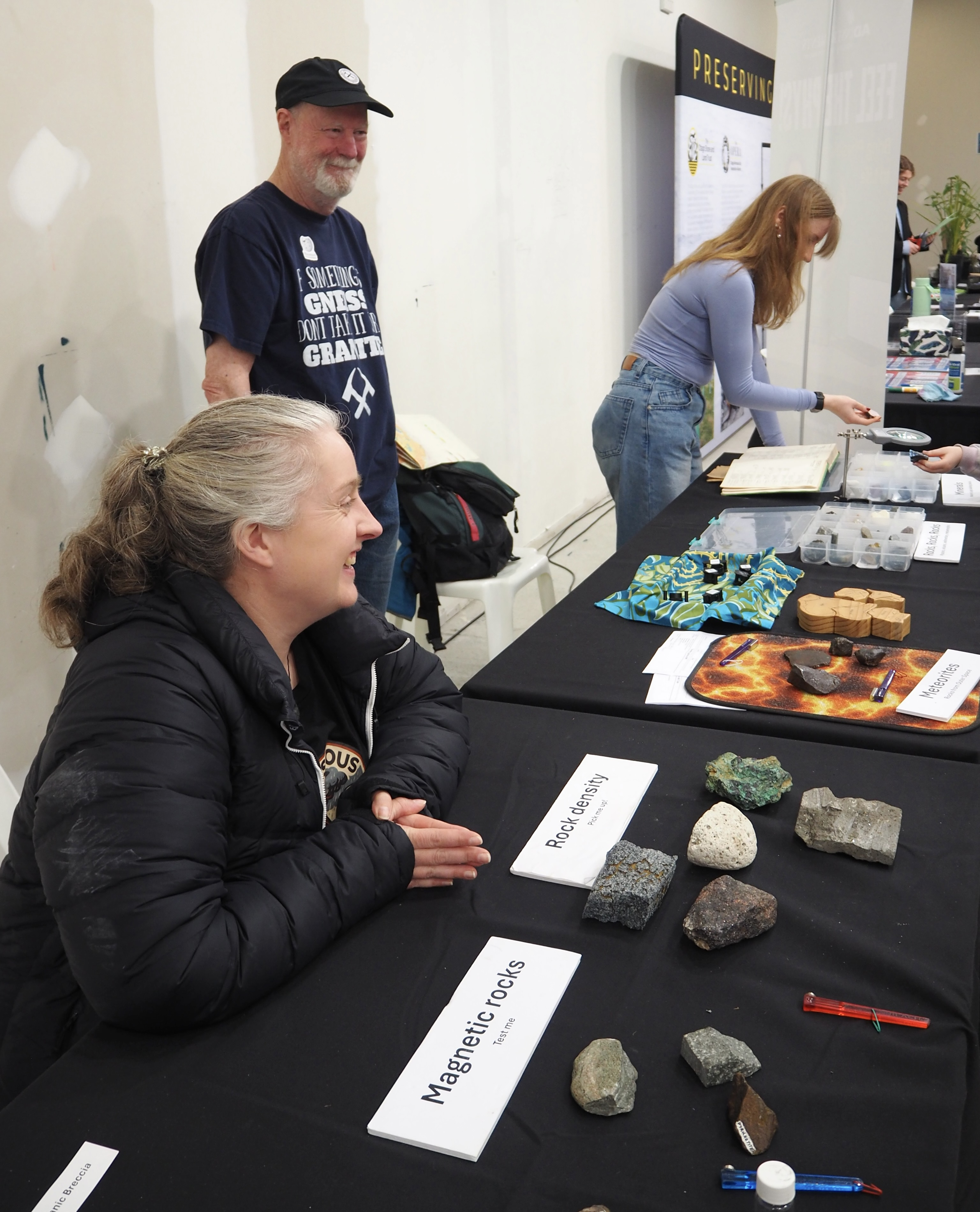
Hands-on geology table

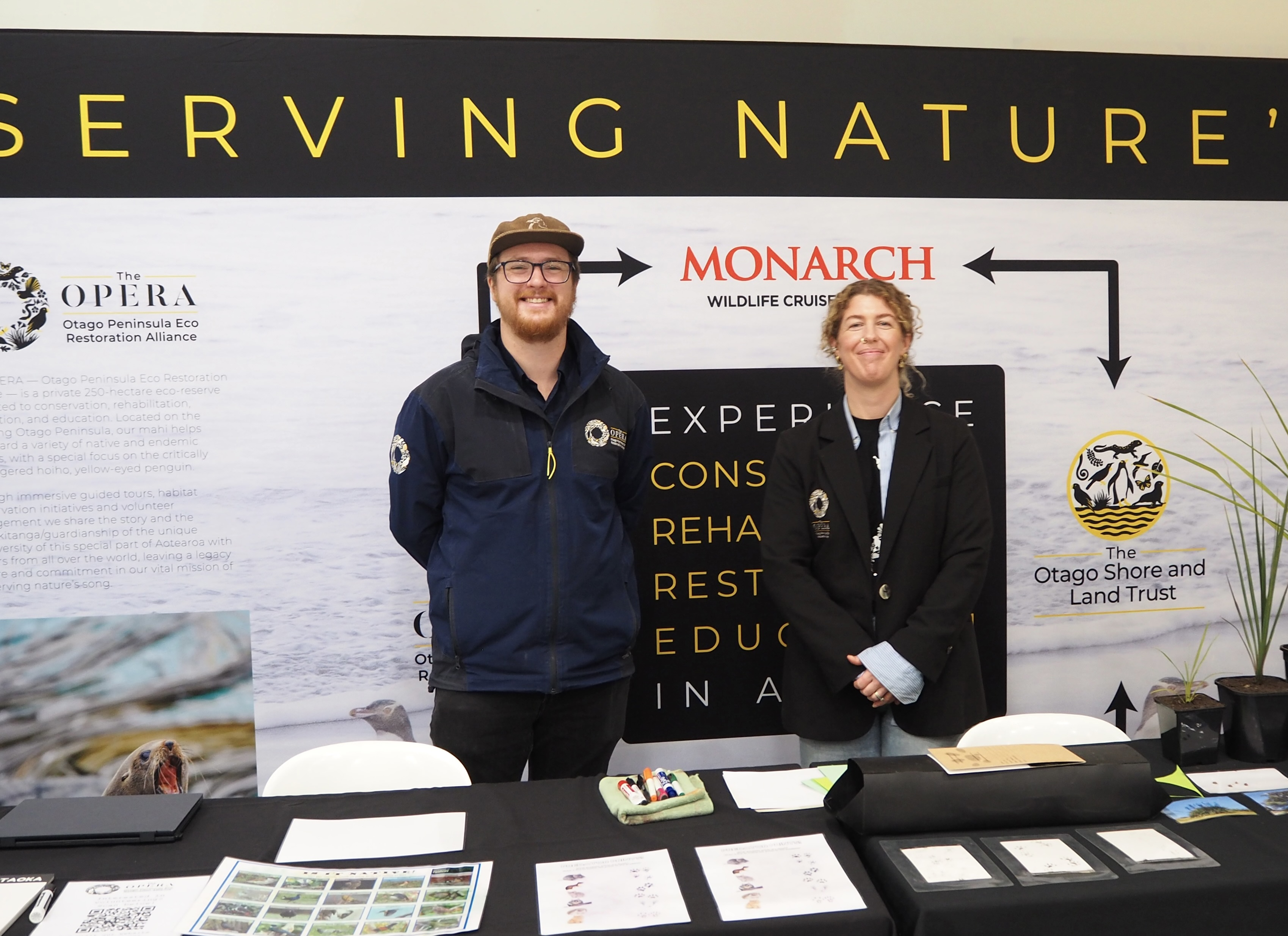
Otago Peninsula Ecological Restoration Alliance

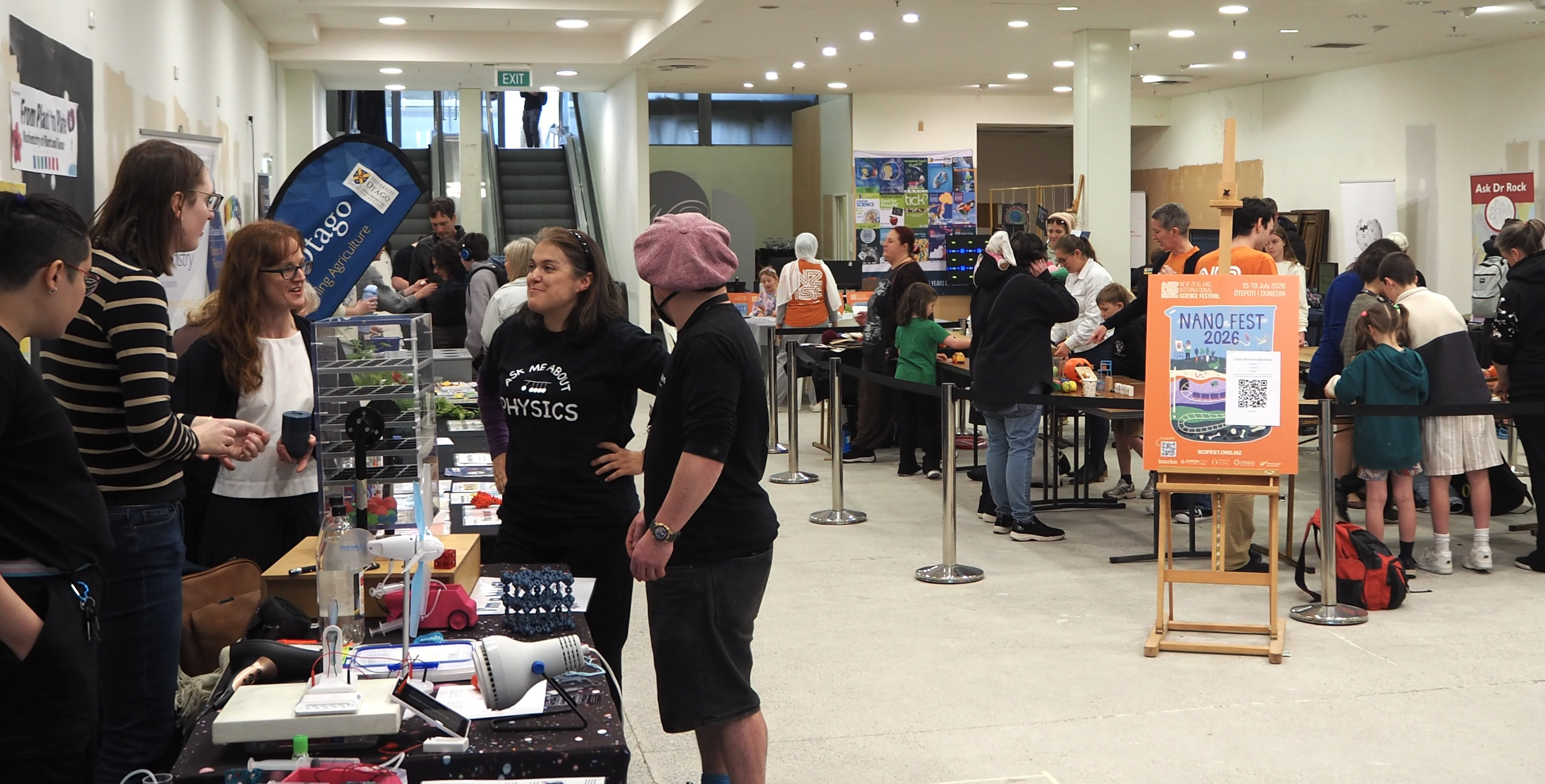
