= Public science =

Research conducted amongst, or including, the public

Public science is research that is conducted amongst, or includes, the public. Two traditions of public science have emerged, one based on participatory action research and another based on science outreach.

== Participatory action research ==
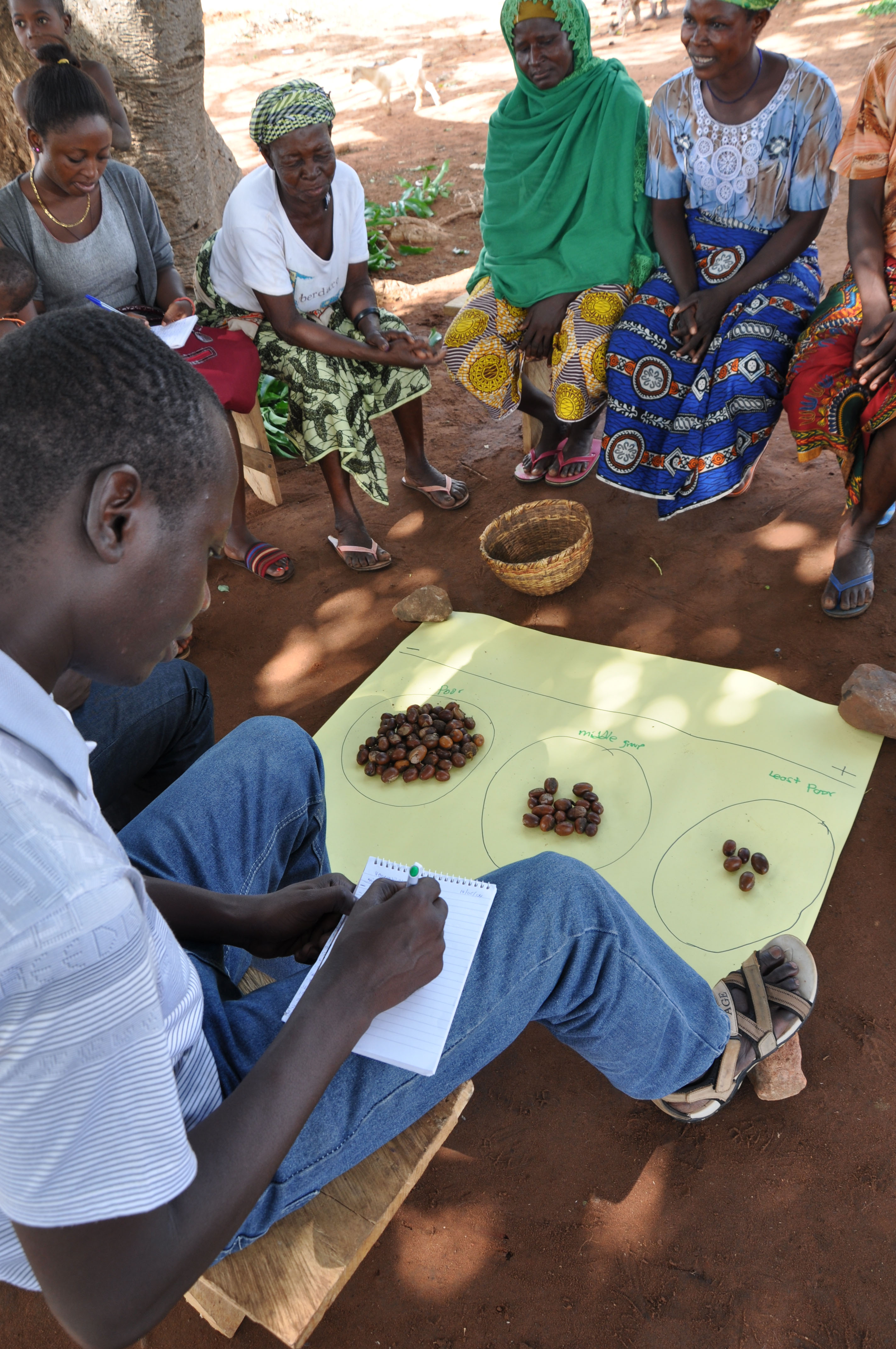
Participatory action research in Ghana

The participatory action research approach seeks to develop a critical framework for making systematic inquiry and analysis a public enterprise. It is committed to valuing knowledges that have been historically marginalized and delegitimized (i.e., youth, prisoner, immigrant, farmer) alongside traditionally recognized knowledges (i.e., scholarly). Through the formation of research collectives, it aims to share the various knowledges and resources held by its individual members so members can participate as equally as possible. The choice of appropriate research questions, design, methods and analysis as well as useful research products are decided collectively. Institutions for this form of public science include the Public Science Project. Examples of public science projects in the participatory action research tradition include the Morris Justice Project.

== Science outreach ==
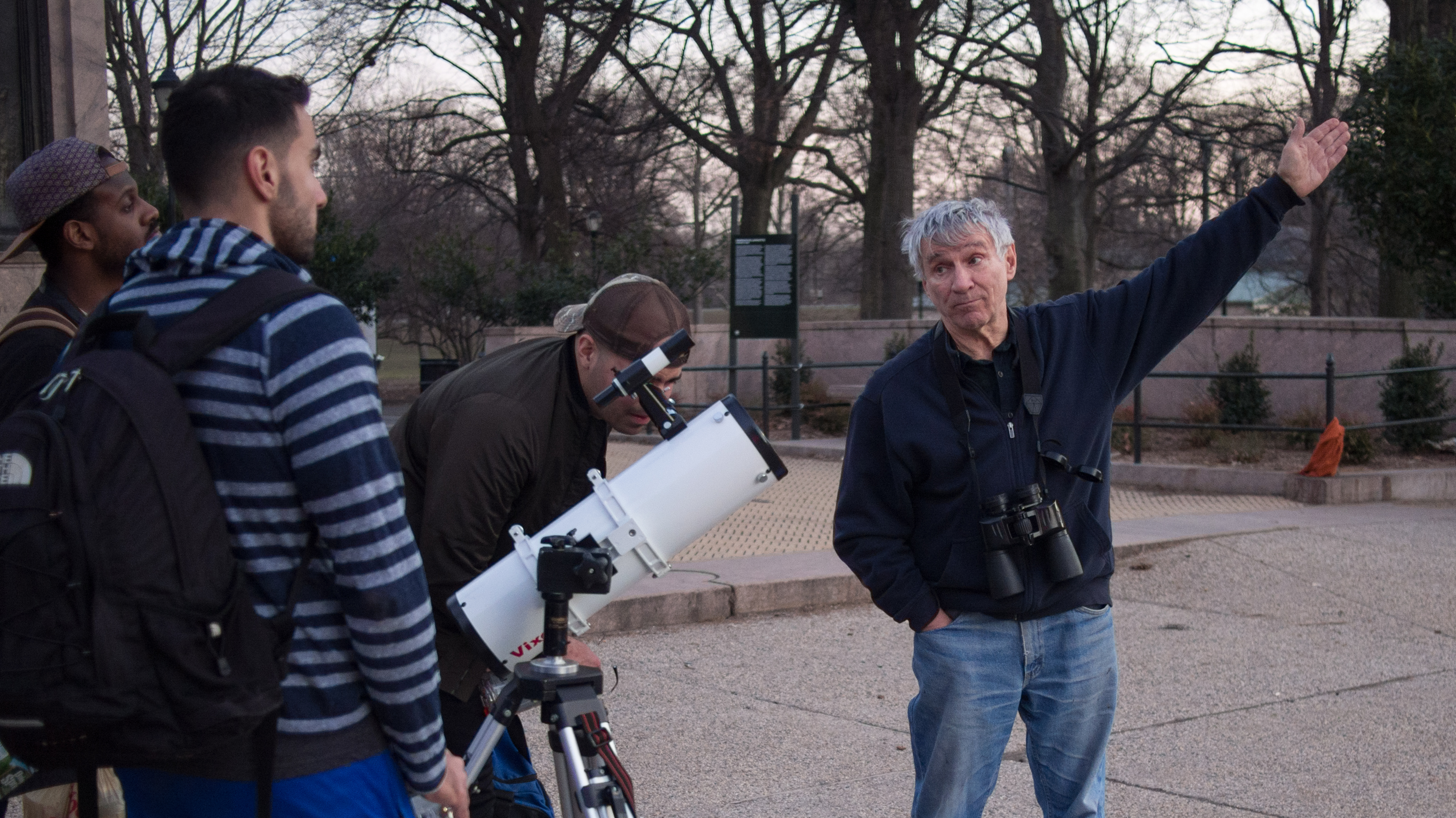
Man in Brooklyn's Prospect Park inviting passersby to use his telescope and talk about an astronomical phenomenon

The science outreach approach has some similarities to citizen science but typically describes projects that are conducted outdoors or in another type of public or accessible space such as a public park, metro stop, library, university campus, etc. Similar to public art, it includes aspects of collaboration, community support and involvement, and site specificity.

Public science efforts in the science outreach tradition include Science on the Buses, in which city buses in many major European Union cities were decorated with large informational science posters in November 2002. Likewise, a project in Toronto placed "advertisements" with science facts on buses in Toronto during July 2009.

Science City was a public science initiative that ran from June 1994 through May 1995. Created by staff and consultants from the New York Hall of Science, Science City was an outdoor exhibition that utilized the street, fences, buildings and other public structures in New York City to attract the "non-museum-going" public to the science in everyday life. The exhibition asked questions such as "Why is it warmer in the city?", "What pulses under the street?" and "What's under the sidewalk?" to help increase public awareness about the science and technology that runs invisibly underneath modern urban life.

Science Cafés, founded by the public science pioneer Duncan Dallas, are public science events that initiate a discussion on a science topic in pubs or cafes, usually with a local researcher in attendance to answer questions and present information.

Science festivals can also be grouped into this category of public science efforts, with modern incarnations of festivals including a range of learner-centered activities and events conducted in public spaces.

Public science initiatives often attempt to reach new audiences (particularly, non-experts who might not actively seek out science), in addition to existing science outreach audiences, by hosting events in alternative informal learning environments. By definition, such public science projects are outside the walls of the science centre or science museum, where the main focus of the particular space is not typically science outreach.

An example of a specific public science initiative in astronomy is From Earth to the Universe (FETTU), a project of the International Year of Astronomy 2009 (IYA2009). FETTU displayed large-scale images of astronomical objects with contextual information and supplementary materials and activities in non-traditional and mostly public locations such as parks, airports, art festivals, and shopping malls. By 2011, FETTU had been exhibited at about 1000 sites worldwide, with 50 sites in the United States. One result from FETTU demonstrated a trend towards more non-self-selective audiences for science communications in these public spaces.
