= Glasgow Science Festival =

Annual science festival in Scotland

Glasgow Science Festival (GSF) is a science festival held every June in Glasgow, Scotland. It was founded in 2007 and provides science-themed events for children, schools and adults at various venues in the city, including lecture theatres, laboratories, cafes, pubs, theatres and cinemas.

The majority of events are free of charge to promote accessibility and events are developed primarily with practicing scientists in order to showcase real research.

Events include science comedy nights, pub quizzes, whisky tastings, art classes, workshops and tutorials on the science of 'zombie-ism'. Science Sunday is a day of family activities at the University of Glasgow which coincides with the West End Festival.

The festival is primarily funded by the University of Glasgow and the Scottish Government. It also involves partnerships with a variety of organisations including the University of Strathclyde, Glasgow Caledonian University, the MRC, Kelvingrove Art Gallery & Museum, the RPSB, Glasgow School of Art, the British Science Association, Glasgow Botanic Gardens and Glasgow Science Centre

The festival director is Dr Deborah McNeill, a marine biologist and Head of Public Engagement in STEM at the University of Glasgow.

In 2013 the festival was launched on a barge on the Forth and Clyde Canal, chartered by The Clipperton Project and attended by Scottish Minister Alasdair Allan.

In 2017 the festival was awarded a Herald Higher Education Award for Outstanding Contribution to the Community for gravitational waves-inspired show 'Chasing the Waves'. 'Chasing the Waves' was also a finalist in the Times Higher Education Awards

== Other projects ==
Outside of the festival period in June, the festival delivers a range of public engagement projects that bring STEM subjects to new audiences:

- 'A Shed Load of Science', funded by the Royal Society of Chemistry, involved working with scientists and artists to deliver free arts-science activities for communities in the North of Glasgow, including Possilpark and Lambhill.
- 'Cleaner Canal Science' was a collaboration with Scottish Canals and the Scottish Waterways Trust, funded by Zero Waste Scotland. This project engaged primary schools, community groups and local businesses in hands-on science, as a means of tackling the problem of litter on canals in Maryhill, Firhill and Clydebank.
- 'CLAN' (Community Led Ambassador Network) was funded by a Scottish Government Talking Science grant and connected University of Glasgow researchers with communities in the top 0.5% most deprived in Scotland, through free community-led public engagement activity.
- 'Panto Science: The Periodic Fable' is a theatre show which blends pantomime with science. The idea was conceived by Dr Zara Gladman, Public Engagement Co-ordinator for Glasgow Science Festival. The story was developed by Dr Gladman with University of Glasgow researchers and comedian Bruce Morton, who wrote the script for a live show. The show aims to promote the message of gender equality in STEM to children.
- 'Chasing the Waves' was a live, musical show co-written by Dr Zara Gladman and Emily Benita which shared the story of how Glasgow scientists helped detect gravitational waves. The show was the first of its kind to bring gravitational waves to the theatre.
