= Samantha Yammine =

Canadian neuroscientist and science communicator

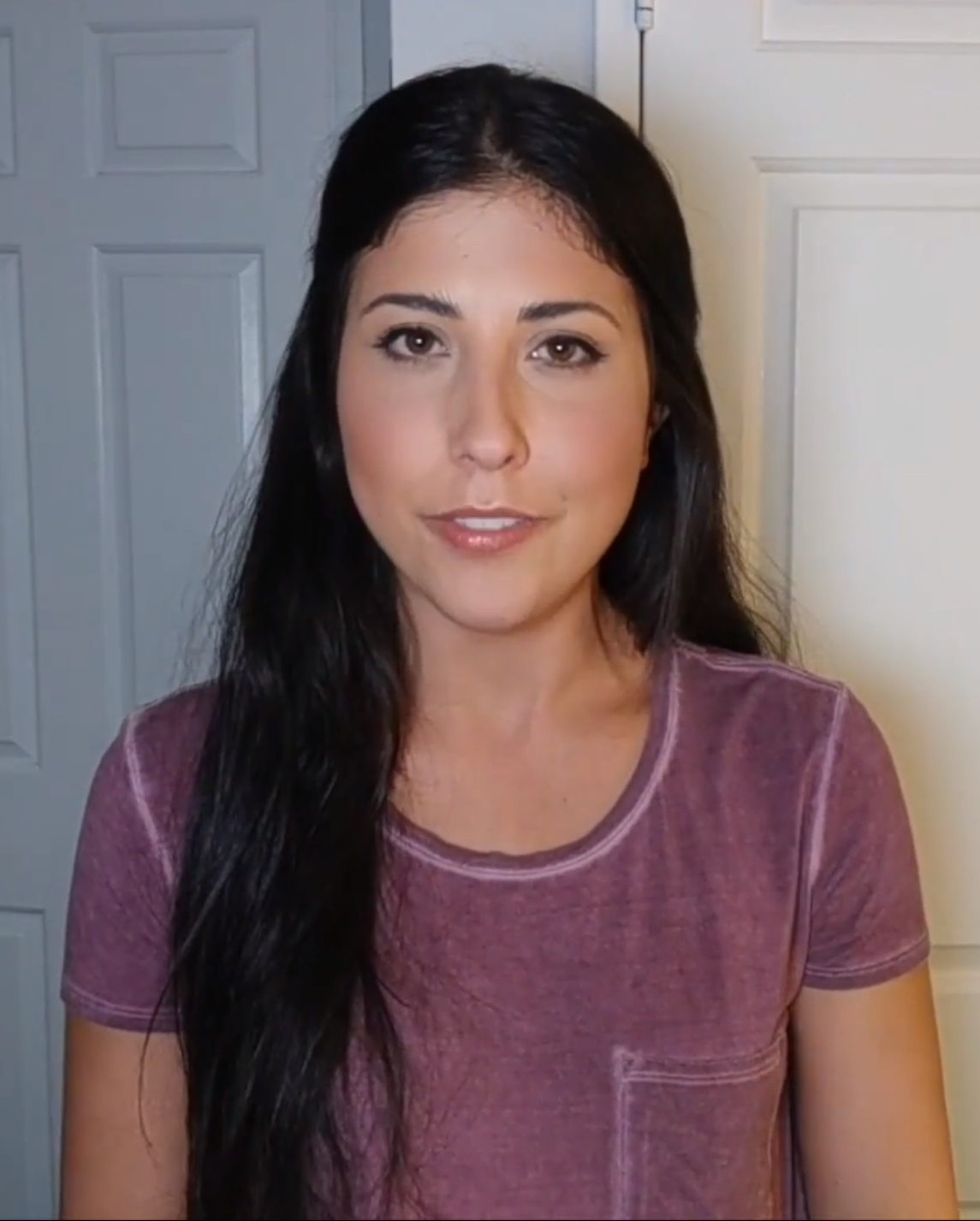
- Education: University of Toronto (PhD)
- Occupations: Science communicator, neuroscientist
- Website: samanthayammine.com

Samantha Yammine is a Canadian neuroscientist and science communicator. She completed her PhD in 2019 at the University of Toronto.

== Education ==
Yammine earned her PhD in the Department of Molecular Genetics researching in Derek van der Kooy's neurobiology lab at the University of Toronto. She investigated activation and quiescence of neural stem cells and the fate specification of their progeny using clonal lineage tracing and single cell transcriptomics strategies.

== Career ==
Yammine is a science communicator. On social media, she goes by the name Science Sam. Her primary platform is Instagram, where she shares photographs, neuroscience news and facts, and items pertaining to daily life as a scientist.

In August 2017, she joined a group of science communicators to launch the Scientist Selfies project, a crowd-funded experiment using social media to test whether scientists sharing science through selfies on Instagram are rated differently in terms of warmth, trustworthiness, and competency. Using the hashtag "#ScientistsWhoSelfie", the international and interdisciplinary team raised over $10,000 and collected over one thousand images from across the world. Yammine was given a bursary as an 'emerging producer' by the World Congress for Science and Factual Producers in 2017. She was an invited speaker at the 2018 USA Science and Engineering Festival and the 2018 Science Writers and Communicators of Canada.

In March 2018, Science magazine published a personal essay by a PhD candidate that critiqued academia's readiness to celebrate Yammine's and others' use of Instagram as a way to correct for systemic gender biases in STEM fields. Yammine and three coauthors replied with a letter in Science the following month.

With co-producers Shawn Hercules, Geith Maal-Bared, Daniel Celeste, and Carrie Boyce, she created the event Science is a Drag, during which scientists give lip sync performances and speak about their scientific research while wearing drag. The first event was held in Toronto in 2019 with support from the Royal Canadian Institute. In March 2019, Yammine and television host Pierre-Yves Lord conducted an interview of Canadian astronaut David Saint-Jacques live while he was at the International Space Station.

Beginning in January 2020, Yammine began publishing short videos on the science of COVID-19. The following year Toronto Life magazine named her "The Covid queen of TikTok" for her videos covering "big-picture concepts" concerning COVID-19 vaccines and vaccine mandates in Ontario. The magazine reported that her videos on social media were viewed more than five million times a month and that she was the "go-to Covid news source for the TikTok gen." She is one of the spokespersons for ScienceUpFirst, a science communication initiative aiming at reducing the impact of COVID-19 misinformation online.

== Selected publications ==
- Paige Brown Jarreau, Imogene A Cancellare, Becky J Carmichael, Lance Porter, Daniel Toker, Samantha Z Yammine. 2019. Using selfies to challenge public stereotypes of scientists. PLoS ONE; 14(5): e0216625. doi:10.1371/journal.pone.0216625.
- Samantha Z Yammine, Christine Liu, Paige B Jarreau, Imogen R Coe. 2018. Social media for social change in science. Science; 360(6385): 162–163. doi:10.1126/science.aat7303.
- Rachel L Reeve, Samantha Z Yammine, Cindi M Morshead, Derek van der Kooy. 2017. Quiescent Oct4 + Neural Stem Cells (NSCs) Repopulate Ablated Glial Fibrillary Acidic Protein + NSCs in the Adult Mouse Brain. Stem Cells; (9): 2071–2082. doi:10.1002/stem.2662.
- Samantha Yammine. 2020. Fight coronavirus misinformation. Nature; 581: 345-346.
