= Caithness International Science Festival =

Annual event in Caithness, Scotland

The Caithness International Science Festival is an event which is held annually in Caithness, Scotland. The science festival features talks, tours and exhibitions for in locations around Wick, Thurso and rural Caithness. It is aimed at children, families and adults and has been held each March since 2003.

== History ==
The festival was first held in 2003. The festival aims to encourage young people to study science.

The Caithness International Science Festival is one of the largest science festivals in Scotland and thousands of people in the Highlands attend the festival every year at around a hundred events held in schools, local countryside with workshops, evening lectures and public open days all of which are free of charge. The festival was founded by Professor Iain Baikie, who remains as chair and Colin Mathieson as treasurer. Patrons are John Thurso and Lord Lieutenant Anne Dunnet. Sponsors have included the Scottish Executive, KP Technology, Kongsberg and Dounreay and Subsea 7

Speakers have included STS 109 Astronaut Duane Carey, Professor Louise Dolan, Lord Advocate Colin Boyd, Astronomer Royal John C Brown, Emeritus Professor Hugh Pennington, Entrepreneur Fraser Doherty, Chief Scientific Advisor Professor Anne Glover, Professor Martin Hendry, Professor Chris Speed, Tania Johnston, Professor Chris Speed Robin Grimes, among many others.
