= Scientists in School =

Canadian educational charity

- Founded: 1989
- Founder: Erica Bruce, Nancy Williams
- Type: Charitable organization
- Purpose: Education, outreach, science
- Headquarters: Pickering, Ontario
- Location: Canada
- Method: Hands-on workshops
- Website: scientistsinschool.ca

Scientists in School is a Canadian science, technology, engineering and mathematics (STEM) education charitable organization that offers curriculum-aligned hands-on workshops for students from Kindergarten to Grade 8 across Canada. Workshops are offered in English and French and are led by presenters. The organization also offers community workshops for libraries, summer camps, daycares, after-school programs and community groups. It has reached more than 10 million children and youth since 1989.

The organization states that its mission is to encourage scientific curiosity in children, help them connect scientific knowledge to the world around them, and build interest in careers in STEM.

== History ==
Scientists in School was founded in 1989 by Erica Bruce and Nancy Williams on behalf of the Ajax-Pickering branch of the Canadian Federation of University Women (CFUW). At first the organization followed the CFUW's mandate that women graduates use their education to effect social change. In 1999, when it was reaching more than 100,000 students a year, it incorporated as a non-profit charity under founding executive director Cindy Adams.

The program began with 40 classrooms in Durham Region, then expanded to Toronto in 1997 and Guelph in 1999. It later reached schools in Peel, Waterloo, Halton, Niagara and Ottawa. The first branch outside Ontario opened in Lethbridge, Alberta, in 2010, again with the local CFUW branch.

Scientists in School reached their 5 millionth student and a French language workshop stream was developed for Eastern Ontario (2012). A community workshop program was launched (2013), providing workshops to daycares, summer camps, libraries and community groups.

In 2014, Scientists in School celebrated their 25th year and officially added a second Alberta branch in Calgary. Their focus on equity expanded with the launch of the Adopt-a-School initiative, fully supporting schools serving under-resourced communities with complimentary workshops for every classroom. With the help of visionary partners, 33 schools were adopted, giving 17,800 children the opportunity to experience Scientists in School.

In 2019, Scientists in School reached their 8 millionth young scientist. Their Adopt-a-School impact almost tripled to supporting 47,500 students in 88 schools serving low-income communities across Ontario and Alberta. Scientists in School launched a Lift-a-School initiative, which like Adopt-a-School, supports schools serving low-income communities that are unable to afford the workshop fee, providing complimentary workshops on a one-to-one match for every workshop paid for by the school.

In 2020, Scientists in School reached their 10 millionth student.

Scientists in School responded to the pandemic by launching a virtual delivery model that includes delivering topic-curated mini science bags for every student in advance of the workshop. The virtual program includes over 40 virtual community and classroom workshops combined. The virtual model enabled Scientists in School to become a national organization delivering workshops in every province from coast to coast.

In 2020, Spotlight with Scientists in School, an original STEM career interview series was launched. Interviews highlight scientists who are trailblazers in their fields exploring science topics trending in the news with a focus on ways to increase diversity, equity, and inclusion in STEM. Spotlight with Scientists in School premieres on their Facebook page and YouTube channel. In 2022, Spotlight with Scientists in School aired on Rogers TV in eight regions across Ontario including Durham, Ottawa, London, Uxbridge, Georgina, Orangeville, Keswick, and Owen Sound. Rogers premieres Spotlight episodes bi-weekly.

In 2021 Scientists in School rebranded with a new look that included fonts, icons, colours, and a new logo . The logo features a hand to signify the importance of the hands-on element in all the workshops. The hand image also features a "loop" to signify the infinite possibilities of STEM. In 2022 Scientists in School launched a fully accessible user-friendly new website.

== Awards ==
- Conference Board of Canada's Top 100 Best Community-Business-Education Partnerships (1997)
- Michael Smith Award for Excellence in Science Promotion by The Natural Sciences and Engineering Research Council of Canada (NSERC)
- YWCA Durham Region Women of Distinction Award to Executive Director Cindy Adams (2003)
- Ajax/Pickering Board of Trade 2009 Business Excellence Award
- Ajax-Pickering Board of Trade Award in 2017

== Impact By Numbers ==
- 700,000 children and youth inspired annually through workshops
- 25,000 investigative workshops delivered annually
- 250,000 of the children reached live in communities where they face barriers to educational enrichment including low-income, Indigenous, rural, remote, and newcomer communities
