= Oxford Science and Ideas Festival =

Oxford Science Science and Ideas Festival, also known as IF Oxford, is an annual science festival held in October in Oxford, England, and produced by an independent charity, the Oxfordshire Science Festival. The festival runs annually for two or three weeks, involving over 100 events across Oxford and surrounding communities.

== Origins ==
The festival dates back to 1992, when the Oxford Trust, a charitable organisation founded by Sir Martin and Lady Audrey Wood put on a "Festival of Science" from 13 to 18 January. The first event was hosted at Oxford's Old Fire Station arts centre. The festival became an annual event, and in its first ten years ran events at 48 venues, and attracted more than 75,000 visitors.

For many years, the festival operated under the name 'Oxfordshire Science Festival', and in 2018 was renamed 'IF Oxford'. The 29th festival, in 2020, was run entirely online due to the COVID pandemic. It returned to an in-person festival in 2021.

Over the years the festival has expanded both in terms of the number of venues, and duration. In the early 2000s, the festival ran in January and February, and later, in June. It has run annually in October since 2018.

== Programme ==
Each year, the programme features hands-on activities, exhibitions, talks and tours, with an emphasis on making science accessible to all, on exploring the intersections between art, creativity and science, and a diverse programme with many events run in outlying communities of the city of Oxford. The 2023 festival programme was launched over the August Bank Holiday weekend, with the festival running from 6 October to 29 October.

The 2024 science and ideas festival ran across Oxford from 6 October to 3 November, with 'Super Science Sunday' held at Science Oxford, and over 100 other events held at more than 40 venues around the city. One of the presenters at the 2024 festival was Natty Mark Samuels, an Oxford-based folklorist and story-teller.

The 2025 science and ideas festival ran a family science and outdoor theatre event at the newly created Fallaize Park, part of the Oxford North innovation district. The activities were themed to link with a new 3D-artwork your planetary assembly, created by Icelandic artist Olafur Eliasson.

The 2026 festival marked the 35th anniversary of the event, and ran across multiple venues in and around Oxford, in October 2026. Activities included a science activity zone in Oxford North, the annual 'explorazone' in Bonn square, Oxford, and hands-on sessions on "metals and colour from the Earth" at Rose Hill community centre.

== Festival directors ==
Renée Watson was festival manager from 2008 to 2017. Dane Comerford has been the festival's director since 2017.
