= Science Rendezvous =

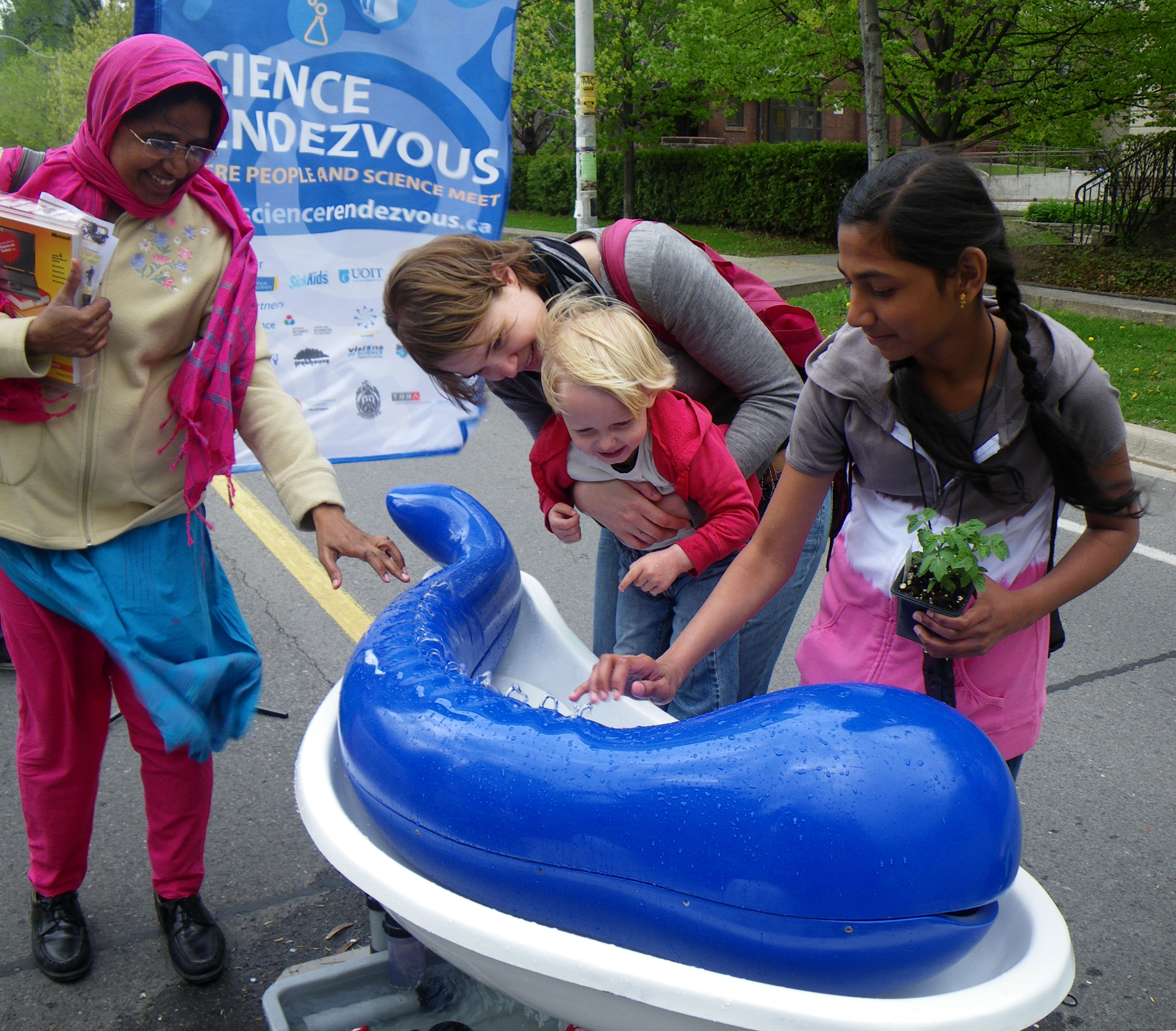
Science Rendezvous signage and logo in background together with exhibit on States-of-Matter, hydraulophone, and H2Orchestra, at University of Toronto, 2009. Science Rendezvous makes science accessible to people of all-ages, including children.

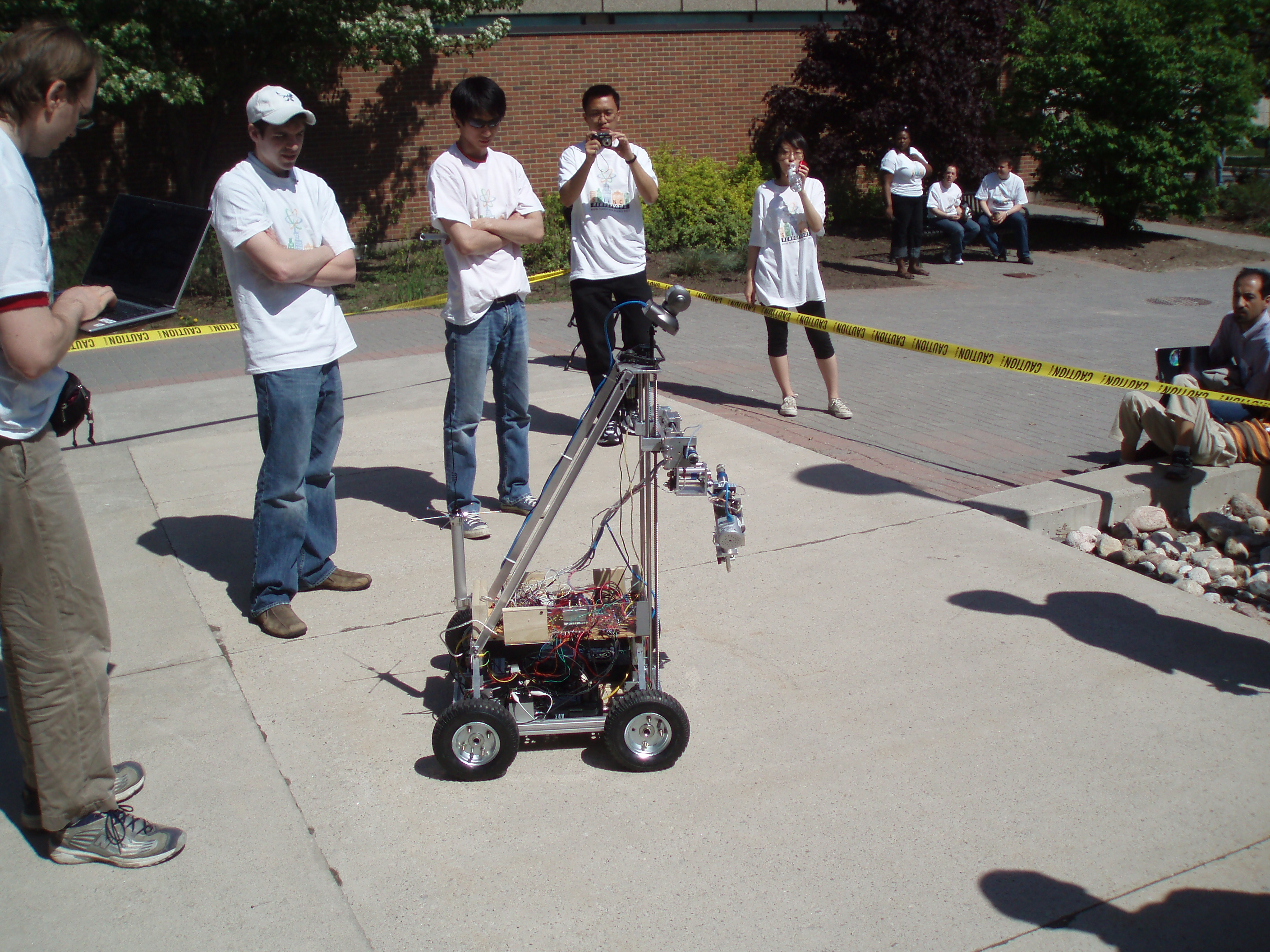
The York University Rover Team showing their rover during the event

Science Rendezvous is the largest science festival in Canada; its inaugural event happened across the Greater Toronto Area (GTA) on Saturday, May 10, 2008 with the support from the University of Toronto, Ryerson University (now Toronto Metropolitan University), York University and Ontario Tech University. By 2011 the event had gone national, with participation from most major research institutes, universities, science promotion groups and the Canadian public. Science Rendezvous is a registered not-for-profit organization dedicated to making science accessible to the public. In 2019, there were more than 300 festival events in 30 cities across Canada.

This free all-day event aims to promote scientific awareness and literacy in Canada. The target audience is the general public, specifically families, with an ultimate aim of improving enrollment and investment in technology and sciences in the future.

== Programs ==
There are a number of different programs that people can participate in, including:

INVENTours: Laboratory and facility tours, demonstrations, activities and lectures at a number of science, technology, research and educational institutes.

Sipping Science: Hosted in cafes, these are discussions with scientists on current hot science topics.

Science Carnival: Demonstrations and hands-on activities in fun carnival atmosphere.

The Amazing Science Chase: First hosted by the University of Toronto. Teams of 2-4 participants compete in an Amazing Race-style event. Participants solve clues and apply their scientific knowledge to solve challenges as part of an immersive story.

== Sites/Groups that have Participated in Science Rendezvous ==
In the Greater Toronto Area

- Harbourfront Centre
- Hospital for Sick Children
- Let's Talk Science
- MaRS Discovery District
- Mt. Sinai Hospital's Samuel Lunenfeld Research Institute (with participation from St. Michael's Hospital, Toronto)
- Ontario College of Art and Design
- Ontario Genomics Institute
- Ontario Institute for Cancer Research
- Ontario Science Centre
- Scientists in School
- Toronto Metropolitan University
- Toronto Public Library
- Toronto Zoo
- Treehouse Group
- University Health Network
- Ontario Tech University
- University of Toronto Mississauga
- University of Toronto Scarborough
- University of Toronto St. George
- Xerox
- York University (including the Observatory) and Main Street, Markham
- Youth Science Ontario

Other Ontario Sites

- Carleton University
- Durham College
- George Brown College
- Queen's University (Science Rendezvous Kingston at the Leon's Centre)
- University of Guelph
- University of Guelph-Humber
- University of Ottawa
- University of Waterloo
- University of Windsor
- Western University
- McMaster University

Across Canada

- Cape Breton University
- Dalhousie University
- Inner City Science Centre: Niji Mahkwa School, Winnipeg
- Kwantlen Polytechnic University
- University of British Columbia
- McGill University
- Memorial University of Newfoundland
- Simon Fraser University
- Universite de Montreal
- Concordia University
- TELUS World of Science, Edmonton (with support from CIC Edmonton Local Section, Concordia University College, The King’s University College, MacEwan University, NAIT, University of Alberta, University of Alberta Campus Saint-Jean )
- University of Calgary
- University of Manitoba
- University of Regina
- University of Victoria
- University of Alberta
- Southern Alberta Institute of Technology
- University of Winnipeg
- University of Saskatchewan
- Aurora Research Institute
- College of the North Atlantic- Labrador City
- Upstream Research, Imperial Oil Campus, Calgary
- COSIA – Canadian Oil Sands Innovation Alliance
