= Mind Trekkers =

Mind Trekkers is a traveling festival that uses hands-on activities to encourage learning and exploration of STEM (science, technology, engineering, and mathematics) fields. The Mind Trekkers program is one component of the Center for Pre-College Outreach at Michigan Technological University. In the program, Michigan Tech student volunteers demonstrate scientific principles in an appealing way using hands-on activities. The target audience for the program is middle and high school students. Mind Trekkers events take place in a non-traditional atmosphere similar to a carnival in which all of the activities relate to STEM. The Mind Trekkers team members act as role models and near-peer mentors as they help students define their interests and aptitudes in these high-energy events full of activities lasting between 30 seconds to 3 minutes.

== Hands-on Festivals ==
Mind Trekkers creates STEM festivals in partnerships with community educators and officials. Middle and High School students in the area of the festival typically get a field trip day on the first day of the event. Those students spend half their day engaging in STEM themed Experiential Learning. Students at these festivals are free to move about the festival and explore at their own pace. This non-traditional learning setting increases interest in the areas covered by the activities. The following day is generally a free event open to the community. The Mind Trekkers organization is also the official traveling component of the USA Science & Engineering Festival.

== History ==
The Mind Trekkers STEM Road Show was created in 2010, hosting over 35,000 Boy Scouts at the 2010 National Jamboree through their science filled 40’x60’ tent over 5 days. Since then, Mind Trekkers has grown in scope and scale, participating in and hosting STEM Festivals from San Francisco to Washington D.C. Tailoring their events to groups of students from grades PK-12, the program has found a special niche with upper elementary and middle school students. Mind Trekkers looks to span the ‘attraction gap’ created when these students begin to self-select out of engagement in STEM courses. During these years students find these courses move from exploration to work. Mind Trekkers utilizes innovative and engaging activities to raise interest in STEM for young participants. Mind Trekkers volunteers, consisting of undergrad/grad students, ignite inquisitiveness in each participant through explorative learning.

== Purpose ==
1. Creating a student organization provided an opportunity for Mind Trekkers to attend bigger festivals and expand outreach potential.
2. The student organization created capacity to effectively recruit, actively train, and regularly engage volunteers across Michigan Tech's campus.
3. Networking within the team provides opportunities for students involved with Mind Trekkers to connect with other activities and groups.
4. Michigan Tech students are given an opportunity to be creative, grow, teach and LEARN from Mind Trekkers. Leadership development is another benefit.

== Current Membership ==
There are over 1000 undergrad and grad students on the Mind Trekkers mailing list and approximately 200 active members, with a leadership team of six.

=== Leadership ===
The student leadership of the organization consists of six students which is reelected each spring. The term limit for each office is 2 years.

- President
- Vice-President
- Vice-President of Membership
- Vice-President of Archives
- Vice-President of Science & Innovation (x2)

== Events ==
Mind Trekkers has attended events across the continental U.S. and currently has plans to expand their coverage area.

See list of Mind Trekkers events

== Funding ==
Mind Trekkers is funded by a variety of sources which includes: foundations, governmental agencies, corporations, Michigan Tech, and private/public institutions. Organizations that are interested in energizing students about learning from school Parent/Teacher Organizations to industry (AT&T, 3M, Dow Chemical, Chevron etc.) are supporting Mind Trekkers to inspire students about STEM.
