= List of Mind Trekkers events =

This is a list of Mind Trekkers events.

Event title	Event date	Location
Grand Rapids Griffins Score with Science	November 16, 2009	Grand Rapids, MI
FIRST Robotics Regional Championship	April 2010	Minneapolis, MN
BSA National Scout Jamboree	August 2010	Washington, DC
USA Science & Engineering Festival	October 10–24, 2010	Washington, DC
Einstein Project Science Expo	January 2011	Green Bay, WI
Cranbrook Institute Boy Scout Workshop	January 2011	Bloomfield Hills, MI
Detroit Science Center	February 2011	Detroit, MI
AT&T Roadshow	May 3, 2011	Traverse City, MI
AT&T Roadshow	May 4, 2011	Sault Ste. Marie, MI
AT&T Roadshow	May 5, 2011	Escanaba, MI
AT&T Roadshow	May 6, 2011	Iron Mountain
Destination Imagination Global Finals	May 2011	Knoxville, TN
Houghton County Fair	August, 2011	Hancock, MI
Einstein Project Science Expo	January 2012	Green Bay, WI
Southwestern Michigan College	February 2012	Dowagiac, MI
USA Science & Engineering Festival	April 2012	Washington, DC
Sheboygan Science & Engineering Festival	May 2012	Sheboygan, WI
Oak Ridge Associated Universities	May 2012	Oak Ridge, TN
Iron Mountain Science & Engineering Festival	May 2012	Iron Mountain, MI
Destination ImagiNation Global Finals	May 2012	Knoxville, TN
Girl Scout Jamboree	Summer 2012	Green Bay, WI
Upper Peninsula State Fair	August 2012	Munising, MI
Houghton County Fair	August 25, 2012	Hancock, MI
YES! Expo	November 1, 2012	Detroit, MI
Einstein Project Science Expo	January 12, 2013	Green Bay, WI
Kaleidoscope	March 2, 2013	Marquette, MI
College of Lake County Science Festival	April 12, 2013	Grayslake, IL
NWTC Science & Engineering Festival	April 18, 2013	Green Bay, WI
Bemis Science & Engineering Festival	April 19–20, 2013	Appleton, WI
Touch the Future	May 7, 2013	Houghton, MI
Imagination Sensation	May 9, 2013	Sault Ste. Marie, MI
Destination ImagiNation Global Finals	May 22–25, 2013	Knoxville, TN
BSA National Jamboree	July 15–23, 2013	Mount Hope, WV
Great Lakes Bay Science & Engineering Festival	October 4–5, 2013	University Center, MI
MI STEM Partnership	October 22, 2014	Houghton, MI
Bay Area Science & Engineering Festival	November 2, 2013	San Francisco, CA
AAAS Family Science Days	February 13, 2014	Chicago, IL
NBA All Star Jam	February 15, 2014	New Orleans, LA
Munising Family Fun Night	March 18, 2014	Munising, MI
Iron River Science Fair	March 20, 2014	Iron River, MI
Independence School District	April 24, 2014	Newark, DE
USA Science & Engineering Festival	April 25–27, 2014	Washington, DC
AT&T Roadshow	May 5, 2014	Ludington, MI
AT&T Roadshow	May 6, 2014	Harrison, MI
AT&T Roadshow	May 7, 2014	Alpena, MI
Sheboygan Science & Engineering Festival	May 9–10, 2014	Sheboygan, WI
Destination ImagiNation Global Finals	May 21–23, 2014	Knoxville, TN
Dow Great Lakes Bay Regional Science & Engineering Festival	September 23–27, 2014	University Center, MI
Iron Range Science & Engineering Festival	October 3–4, 2014	Virginia, MN
Gull Lake Science & Engineering Festival	November 7–8, 2014	Richland, MI
