= Niagara Region =

Niagara Region can refer to:

- Buffalo Niagara Region, which includes parts of both the United States and Canada
- Buffalo–Niagara Falls metropolitan area, two counties in New York, United States
- Regional Municipality of Niagara, a Canadian regional municipality comprising 12 cities, towns and townships.
- Niagara Peninsula, a geographic area of Canada
