= BergamoScienza =

- Genre: Science Communication
- Locations: Bergamo, Italy
- Founded: 2003
- Attendance: 72,000 (2008); 153,141 (2017)
- Website: Official website

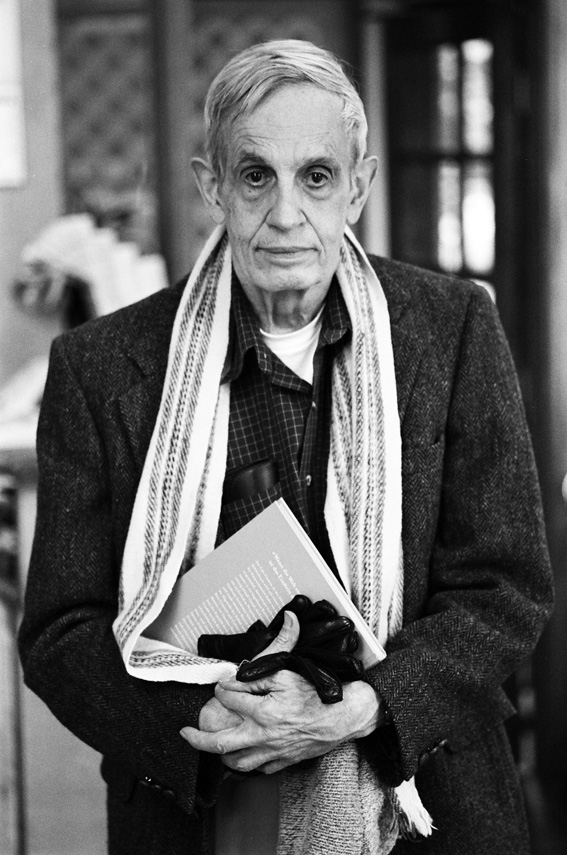
Nobel laureate in Economic Sciences John Nash attended BergamoScienza in 2013.

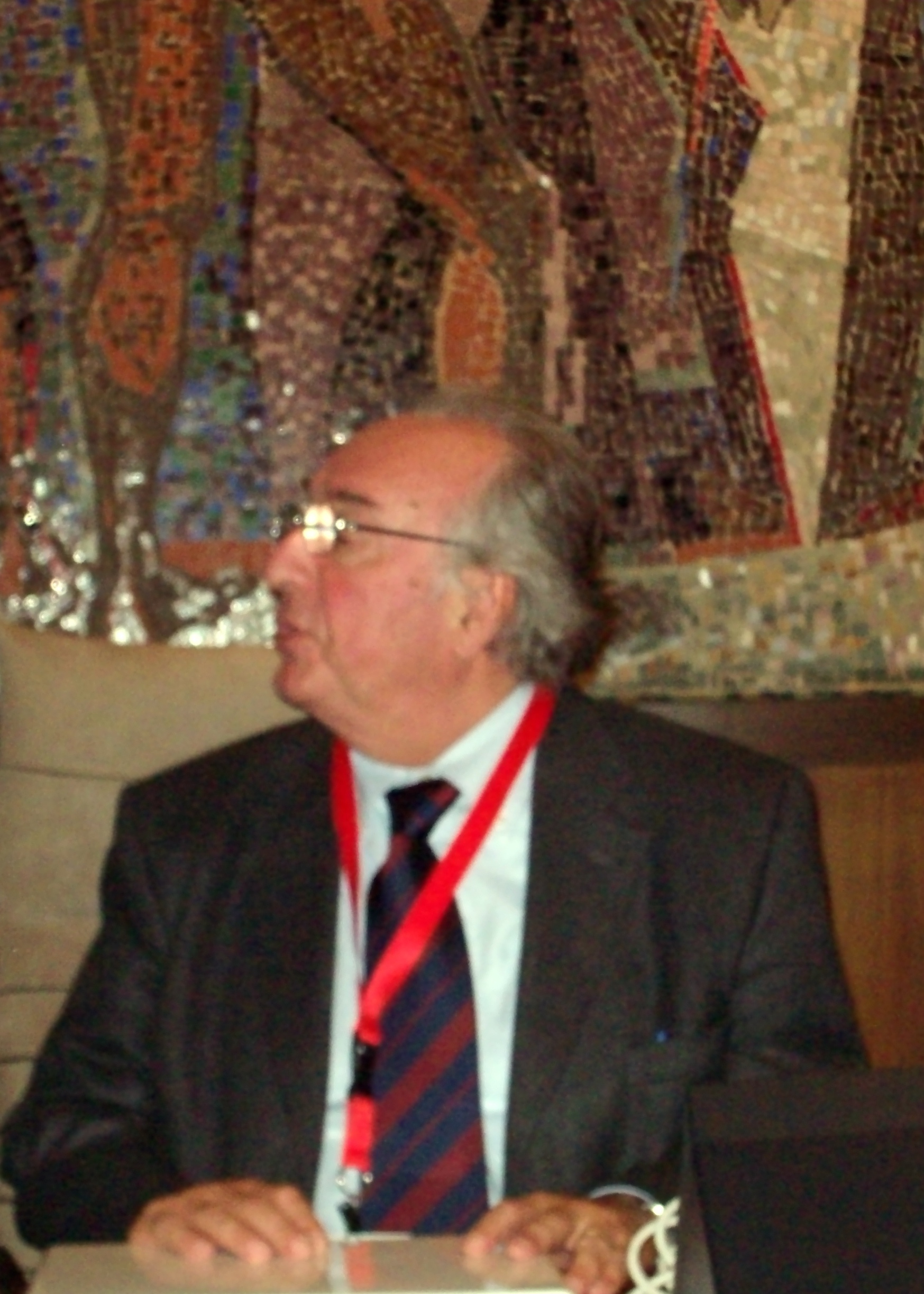
Luciano Maiani at BergamoScienza 2008.

BergamoScienza is a science festival held annually in Bergamo, Italy. Established in 2003, its purpose is to promote the popularization of science. The festival consists of lectures, exhibitions, interactive workshops, as well as meetings with scientists. The event BergamoScienza is organized by the Non-profit organization BergamoScienza, whose founders were a group of friends. 24 Nobel Prize laureates have participated to BergamoScienza since 2003, among them John F. Nash, Kari Mullis, Paul Crutzen, Roald Hoffman, Peter Agre, Aaron Ciechanover, Martin Chalfie, Eric Kandel, Barry Marshall, R. Timothy Hunt, Linda Buck, Bruce Beutler, James Dewey Watson. Among innovative personalities, Wikipedia founder Jimmy Wales attended the conference in 2009.

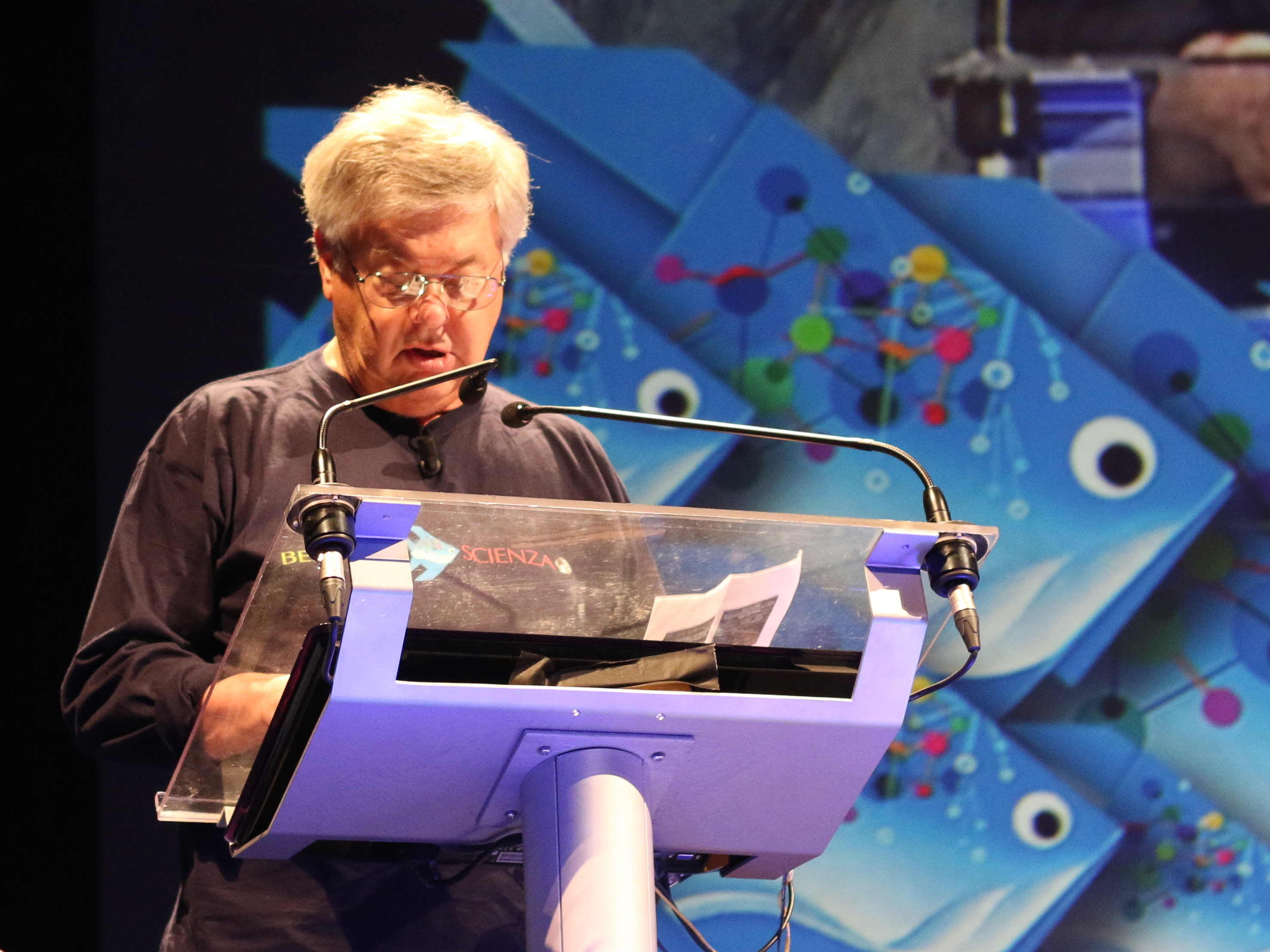
Nobel laureate Michael Stuard Brown at BergamoScienza 2014

In 2004, there were over 35,000 attendees; by 2008, over 72,000 people attended the festival; in the 2011 edition, 112 500. There has never been any charge for admission.

Notable past presenters include Burt Rutan (2004), Marvin Minsky (2006), and Luciano Maiani (2008). The 2009 festival included a presentation regarding Wikipedia, as well as the exhibition "From the Moon to the Earth", organized by the Museo di Scienze Naturali Enrico Caffi.
