= Renée Watson (scientist) =

Australian science communicator and entrepreneur

Renée Watson is an Australian-born science communicator and entrepreneur. She is the founder of The Curiosity Box.

== Background ==
Born in Queanbeyan, Australia, Watson attended the Australian National University, graduating in 2000 and moved to the UK during the same year. In 2008, Watson founded a business called WATS.ON, an association development company which worked with scientific societies and associations, helping them become sustainable and increase outward looking, high-impact work.

From 2008 to 2017, Watson managed the Oxfordshire Science Festival.

== The Curiosity Box ==
The Curiosity Box is an Oxfordshire-based company and the UK's first STEM subscription box, providing science-oriented activities for children aged 7 to 11. It began as a Kickstarter campaign in 2016. Watson won the 2017 Women In Science England (WISE) Toy Award for the creation of The Curiosity box and was awarded Let Toys Be Toys 'Toymark' Good Practice Award

== Talks and interviews ==
- TEDxAthens: ‘Is curiosity the secret to a wonder-filled life?’
- Bustle Six Women in STEM to Watch Out for in 2018
- Top Hat: This Entrepreneur Is Making Kids Fall in Love With Science
- Humans in Business blogpost: Meningitis to Melinda: My 2018
- Goldieblox - STEM role model call: 10 inspiring women in STEM
- Adafruit celebrating the work of Renée Watson, scientist & educator on Ada Lovelace Day
- Stories from Science: Ep 8 – Destination Detonation: Renee Watson and her journey to The Curiosity Box
- Muddy Stilettos: Real Resolutions 2018
- Enterprising Oxford: Entrepreneurs Uncovered
- Critchleys Conversation: Local Business Heroes

== Awards ==
Watson has won numerous awards for her work, including Institute of Directors Director of the Year London & South Finalist Innovation 2019, and 2018, Inclusive Tech Alliance Diversity in Tech, Entrepreneur of the Year Winner 2019 Tech Alliance UK Entrepreneur award Nominated, Blenheim Start Up Finalist 2018, WISE Toy of the Year award winner 2017 Business Magazine Spotlight on Women in STEM finalist Sep 2017, and WOBA Innovation Award winner 2017.
