= John N. Whitaker =

American neurologist (1940–2001)

- Born: John Nicholas Whitaker; November 13, 1940; Memphis, Tennessee
- Died: August 29, 2001 (aged 60); Birmingham, Alabama
- Education: Hendrix College, University of Tennessee College of Medicine
- Spouse: Elaine
- Scientific career
- Fields: neurology, immunology
- Workplaces: University of Alabama, Birmingham

John Nicholas Whitaker (November 13, 1940 – August 29, 2001) was an American neurologist and immunologist dedicated to multiple sclerosis research. He was a pioneer in the field of neuroimmunology and contributed with the identification of myelin basic protein production in urine.

== Biography ==
Whitaker was born in Memphis, Tennessee. He graduated from Hendrix College, after which he earned his medical degree from the University of Tennessee College of Medicine. From 1985 until his death in 2001, he served as chairman of the neurology department at the University of Alabama at Birmingham.

== Research ==
Whitaker published more than 200 papers pertaining to multiple sclerosis.

== Service ==
From 1995 to 1997, Whitaker was president of the American Neurological Association. He was also chair of the medical advisory board of the National Multiple Sclerosis Society from 1994 to 1997. At the time of his death, Whitaker was also on the editorial boards of fourteen academic journals, and an associate editor of four others.

== Awards ==
Whitaker was a member of Alpha Omega Alpha. He also received a Javits Neuroscience Investigator Award, as well as the Outstanding Alumnus of the Year Award from the University of Tennessee College of Medical Alumni Association.
