= List of Astronomy Outreach Resources in Europe =

This is a List of Astronomy Outreach Resources in Europe originally started as an initiative within the framework of the Astronet EU FP7 project.

== Scientific Institutions, Observatories, and National Scientific Societies ==
=== Scientific institutions and Observatories ===
- List of astronomical observatories (not only outreach)
- IAU Office for Astronomy Outreach
- European Southern Observatory (ESO)
- ESO Science Outreach Network (ESON)
- European Space Agency (ESA)
- CERN outreach
- Instituto de Astrofísica de Canarias (IAC, Spain)
- Instituto de Astrofísica de Andalucía (IAA-CSIC, Spain)
- Spanish National Observatory
- Centre of AstroBiology (CAB-CSIC, Spain)
- University of La Rioja (Spain)
- Dublin Institute for Advanced Studies (Ireland)
- Queen Mary Astronomical Observatory (UK)
- University of Oxford Dept of Physics (UK)
- Nottingham Trend University Observatory (UK)
- University of Glasgow A&A group (UK)
- Observatoire de Paris
- Observatoire de Bordeaux
- Institut de Radioastronomie Millimétrique (IRAM)
- GLObal Robotic-telescopes Intelligent Array (GLORIA Project)
- EU-HOU network of demonstration radio telescopes
- Italian National Institute for Astrophysics (INAF)
- Educational resources of INAF (work in progress)
- Osservatorio Astronomico di Cagliari (Italy)
- Onsala Space Observatory (Sweden)

=== National Astronomical Societies ===
- List of astronomical societies
- AstroWeb
- Sociedad Española de Astronomía (SEA)
- Royal Astronomical Society (UK)
- Swedish Astronomical Society (Sweden)

== Science Museums and Planetaria ==
- International Planetarium Society
- Haus der Astronomie Heidelberg
- CosmoCaixa Barcelona (Spain)
- The Observatory (Greenwich) Science Centre (UK)
- The Jodrell Bank Discovery Centre (UK)
- NUI Galway Centre for Astronomy (UK)
- University of Cambridge Centre for Astronomy (UK)
- Herschel Museum of Astronomy (UK)
- National Museums Scotland (UK)
- Deutsches Museum (Germany)
- Cité de l’Espace Toulouse
- Tycho Brahe Planetarium (Denmark)

== Projects ==
- Hands on Universe (EU-HoU)
- EU Universe Awareness (UNAWE)
- Europlanet
- EuroVO AIDA project
- Creative Space (UK)

== Amateur astronomy groups ==
- AstroWeb (2007)

== Magazines, publications, and resources on the web ==
=== Publications ===
- The ESO Messenger
- Revista AstronomíA (Spain)
- Astronomy Now (UK)
- Astronomie Magazine (France)
- Populär Astronomi (Sweden)
- TUIMP "The Universe In My Pocket", free astronomy booklets in many languages

=== Blogs, social networks, and resources on the web ===
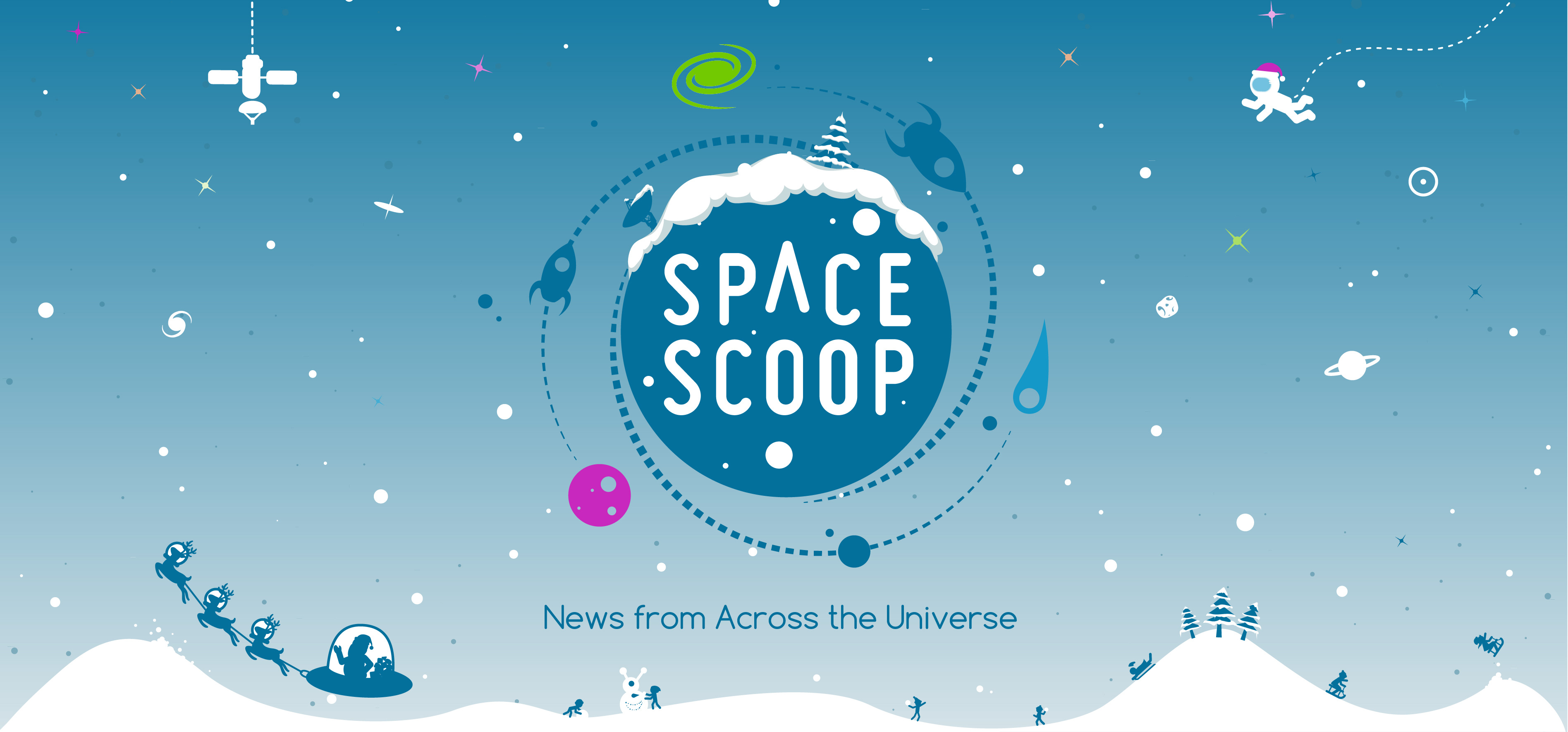
Banner of the Space Scoop webpage.

- Space and Astronomy websites
- UNAWE Space Scoop
- Henrietta Leawitt (videos, Spanish)
- SpaceWeather
- Radioastronomy from Home
- Beginners Guide to Astronomy

=== Campaigns ===
- Globe at night

== Commercial companies, astronomical lodging, star parties ==
- Astronomy events calendar
- Turismo estelar (Spain)
- European AstroFest 2015 (UK)
- EducaCiencia.es (Spain)

== Other resources ==
- IAU network of contact points for outreach
- IAU directory
- IAU “Why is Astronomy important?”
- Astronomy resources in Europe
- Map of astronomical resources in project Radionet FP7
