= International Science Festival in Gothenburg =

Annual festival in Gothenburg, Sweden

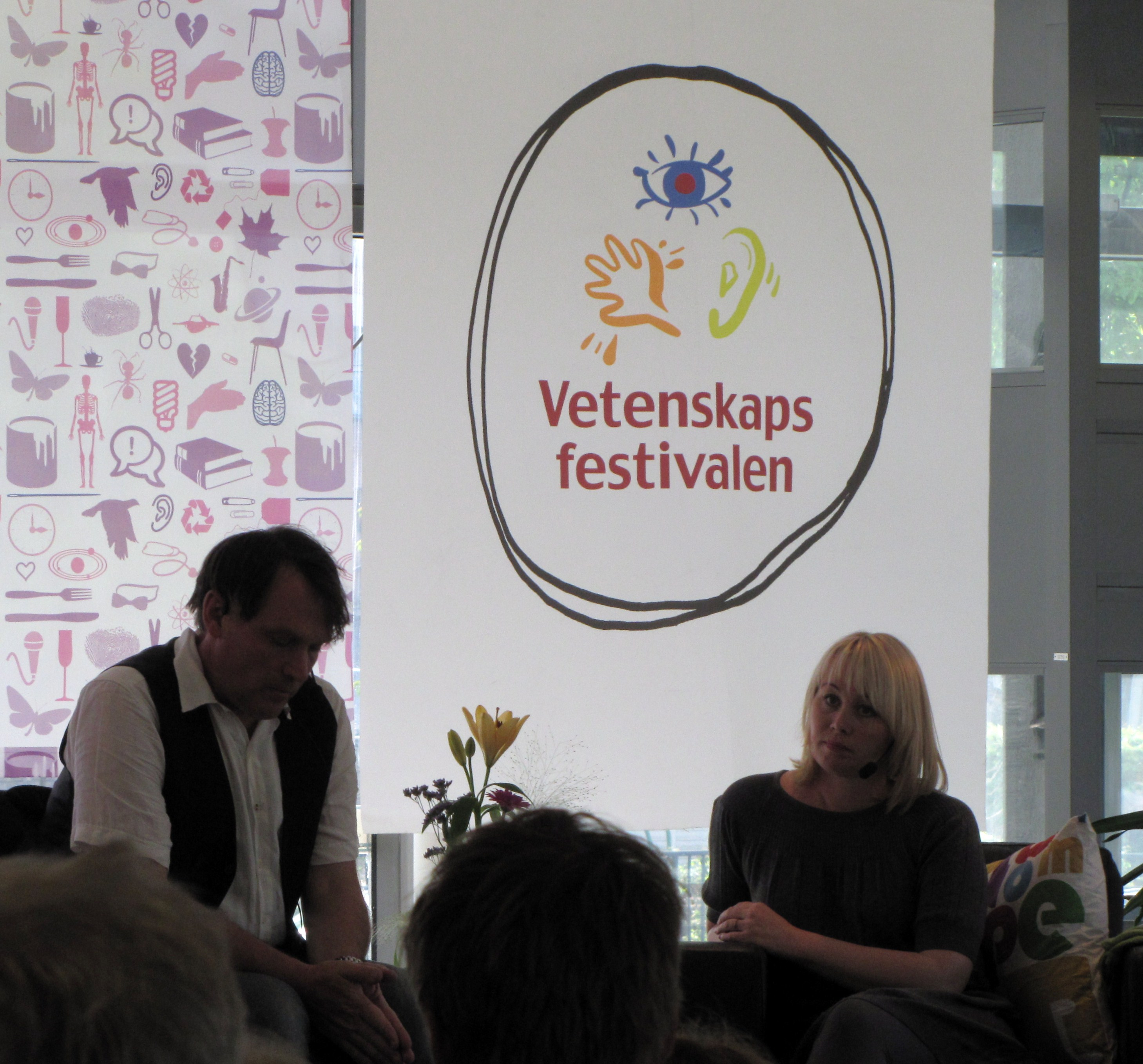
Torgny Nordin converses with Ann Heberlein during the festival of 2011

The International Science Festival in Gothenburg (Swedish: Vetenskapsfestivalen) is an annual festival in Gothenburg with science activities.

== About the festival ==
The International Science Festival in Gothenburg took place for the first time in April 1997 and is since then an annual recurrent event. The purpose is to communicate science to the public and schools in an easy accessible and in a thought provoking manner. Another objective is to create a positive attitude to research and science which is intended to encourage higher education.

About 100 000 visitors come each year. This makes it the largest popular science event in Sweden and one of the largest popular science events in Europe.

University of Gothenburg and Chalmers University of Technology contributes with the knowledge.

The International Science Festival in Gothenburg is a member of the European Science Events Association, EUSCEA.

== Theme ==
Each year a special theme that the festival focuses on is chosen: (translated)

- 2001: Food and eatables
- 2002: Travel and science expeditions, Life and Medicine
- 2003: Love and energy
- 2004: The meaning of life and sustainable development
- 2005: Design, physics, Finland
- 2006: Athletics & health
- 2007: Passion, pistil and personality
- 2008: Let's play
- 2009: Civilization in all times and countries
- 2010: Sustainable feature with small and large changes
- 2011: Creativity
- 2012: It's all in the brain
- 2013: Control or No Clue
- 2014: Act : React : Interact
- 2015: Life and Death
- 2016: Same but Different, 13-17 April

== See also ==
- Universeum - Public science centre in Gothenburg, Sweden
- Hackerspace - Space for people into technology
