= USA Science and Engineering Festival =

Bi-annual science festival in the U.S.

USA Science & Engineering Festival

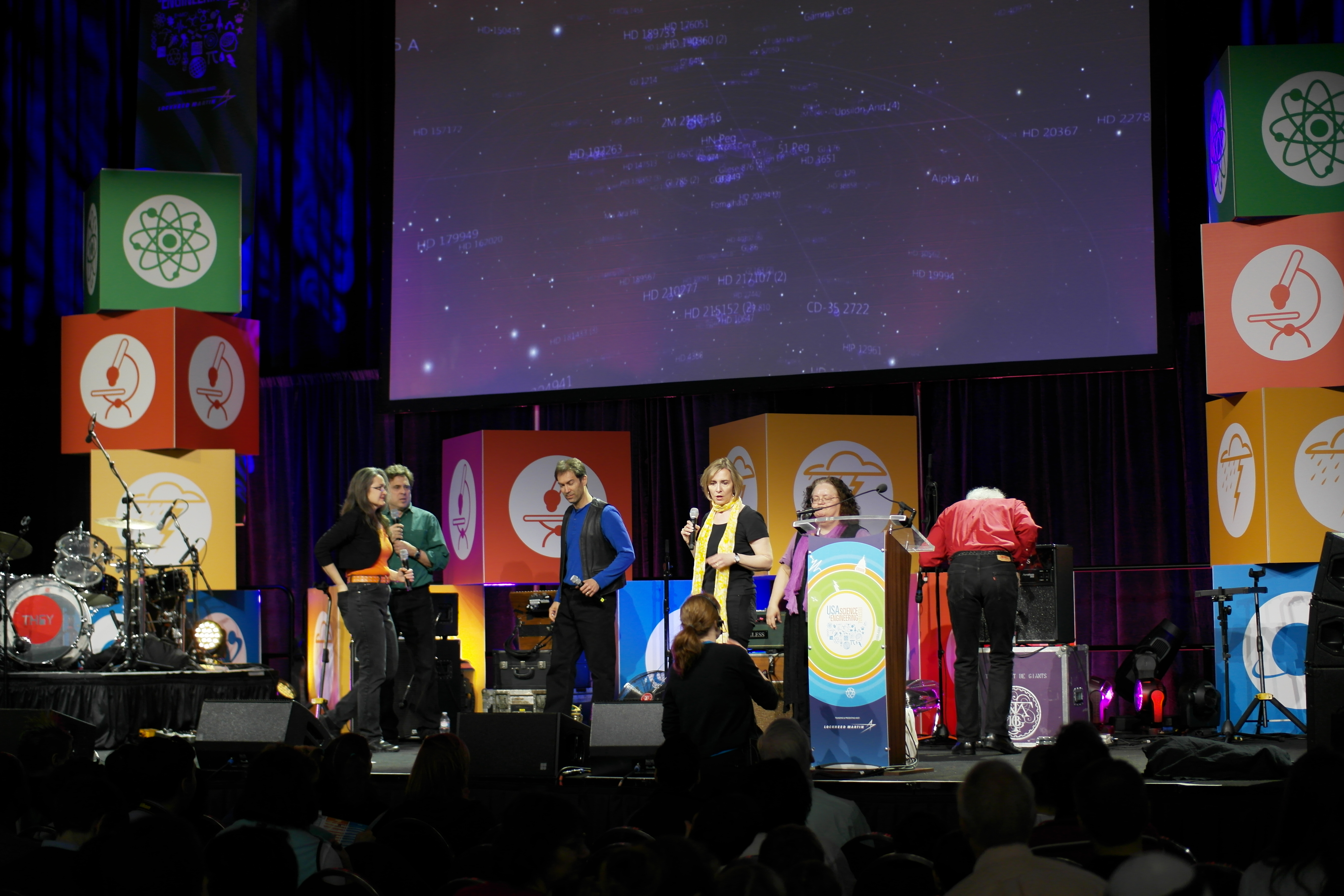
- Status: Active
- Genre: Science festival
- Frequency: Biennial
- Location: Washington, D.C.
- Country: United States
- Years active: 16
- Inaugurated: October 10, 2010
- Founder: Larry Bock
- Most recent: 8 April 2018
- Attendance: 365,000+
- Sponsors: Lockheed Martin, Northrop Grumman Foundation, MedImmune
- Website: www.usasciencefestival.org

The USA Science & Engineering Festival is a biennial science festival held in Washington, D.C. Founded in 2010 by Larry Bock, the festival is the largest celebration of science, technology, engineering, and mathematics (STEM) disciplines in the United States. The inaugural event was held on October 10–24, 2010, the second festival was April 27–29, 2012, the third festival was April 24–27, 2014, the fourth festival was April 16–17, 2016, and the fifth festival was April 7–8, 2018.

== Organization History ==
=== 2010 Festival ===
The 2010 festival lasted for two weeks and culminated with an October 23–24 Expo on the National Mall. The Expo featured interactive hands-on science activities presented by over 550 U.S. science and engineering organizations. 125 universities/research institutes, 125 professional science societies, 50 government agencies, 30 high tech and life science companies and 150 informal science outreach organizations participated in the festival.

==== Nifty Fifty ====
The Nifty Fifty program was a group of fifty nominated professionals in various areas of science and engineering who interacted and spoke about their work and careers to middle and high school students across Washington, D.C., in the fall of 2010. Speakers' backgrounds were varied and spanned chemistry, biotechnology, engineering, math, computer science, medicine, green technology, nanotechnology, business, physics, astronomy, and energy.

==== Lunch With a Laureate ====
The "Lunch with a Laureate" program was focused on a small group of middle and high school students across the greater Washington, D.C., Northern Virginia, and Maryland areas. The purpose of the program was to engage students in informal conversations with a Nobel Prize–winning scientist over a brown-bag lunch. The twelve laureates that participated in this program were Leon M. Lederman, John C. Mather, William Daniel Phillips, Robert H. Grubbs, Alan J. Heeger, Dudley R. Herschbach, Phillip A. Sharp, Kary B. Mullis, Kurt Wuthrich, Douglas D. Osheroff, Baruch Samuel Blumberg and Sir Harry Kroto.

==== Expo ====
The two-week festival ended with a two-day expo on the National Mall that featured over 500 U.S. science organizations. The list of exhibitors included universities, colleges, high school science clubs, student organizations, research institutes, informal science outreach organizations, community organizations, professional science & engineering societies, life science and high tech companies, and other types of science organizations. About 500,000 people reportedly attended the event.

The second expo took place in Walter E. Washington Convention Center in Washington, D.C., on April 27–29, 2012. The third expo took place in the Walter E. Washington Convention Center on April 26–27, 2014.

==== Satellite festivals ====
Satellite festivals were being planned in 2010 at a number of locations throughout the United States, including: Arizona: Tucson; California: Los Angeles, Oakland, San Francisco, Santa Ana; Florida: Gainesville, Jacksonville, Ruskin, West Palm Beach; Idaho: Pocatello; Illinois: Chicago, DeKalb; Maryland: Middle River, Rockville; New Jersey: Clifton; New York: New York City, Rochester; North Carolina: Chapel Hill (North Carolina Science Festival); Ohio: Cleveland, Columbus; Texas: Austin, Dallas, San Antonio; Virginia: Fairfax, Falls Church, Hampton, Reston; Washington: Vancouver (Pacific Northwest Science & Engineering Festival). Michigan Tech's Mind Trekkers is also a traveling component of the USA Science & Engineering Festival.

==== Government support ====
The festival had a bipartisan Honorary Congressional Host Committee of over 100 members. House Resolution 1660 and Senate Resolution 656 were unanimously approved in support of the goals of the USA Science & Engineering Festival.

The White House scheduled its inaugural science fair to coincide with the inaugural USA Science & Engineering Festival. President Obama referenced the importance of this Festival in his keynote address at the White House Science Fair.

President Obama created a dedicated public service announcement inviting the general public to the USA Science & Engineering Festival.

Over 50 major government officials attended or participated directly in the USA Science and Engineering Festival including: Chief Science Advisor John Holdren, Secretary of Transportation Ray LaHood, Head of R&D for Department of Defense Zachary Lemnios, Head of R&D for Office of Naval Research Michael Kassner talks about ONR's involvement with the USA Science and Engineering Festival, Head of R&D for the National Park Service Gary Machlis was involved with the festival's Nifty Fifty program, Head of R&D for EPA Paul Anastas was involved with both the Nifty Fifty program and the kick off of the festival, William Brinkman of the Department of Energy and NIH Director Francis Collins was a Nifty Fifty speaker as well as he performed his own songs at the festival's expo.

==== Science celebrities' support for the festival ====
Many science celebrities participated in the inaugural USA Science & Engineering Festival, including Bill Nye the Science Guy; Jamie Hyneman, Adam Savage, and Kari Byron from the television show MythBusters; Sid the Science Kid; cast members of NCIS; and Ernő Rubik.

=== 2012 Festival ===
The 2012 USA Science & Engineering Festival was at the Walter E. Washington Convention Center on April 28–29, 2012, and Sneak Peek Friday was April 27, 2012. The 2nd USA Science & Engineering Festival hosted programs leading up to the festival, including Nifty Fifty, Lunch with a Laureate, Satellite Events, Sneak Peek Friday and more.

==== Attendees of the 2012 Festival ====
Including attendees, exhibitors, volunteers and staff over 200,000 people actively participating in this momentous Festival celebration over the three-day period. The DC Convention Center has reported that the 2nd USA Science & Engineering Festival is the second most attended event in the history of the Center! Sneak Peek Friday more than doubled in size based on the number of students who had pre-registered, and included nearly 28,000 students, teachers, military families, government officials and press.

The festival was attended by key White House officials such as Valerie Jarrett, Senior Advisor and Assistant to the President for Intergovernmental Affairs and Public Engagement; President Obama's daughters, Sasha and Malia, attended a Nifty Fifty presentation; senior leaders from other countries attended, including Prince Mohammed from Saudi Arabia.

==== Science celebrities ====
Jamie Hyneman and Adam Savage, of Discovery Channel's MythBusters performed at the 2012 Festival. Science celebrities included Bill Nye the Science Guy, Mayim Bialik, Apollo Robbins, Sid the Science Kid, Samantha Yammine, cast members of NCIS Los Angeles, U.S. Olympic Speed Skaters and more. Elon Musk, Richard Garriott and George T. Whitesides were on hand to host a panel discussion. Other celebrities included NASA astronauts, authors, scientists and engineers.

=== 2014 Festival ===
The 3rd USA Science & Engineering Festival featured nationwide contests and school programs during the 2013/2014 school year, including the popular "Nifty Fifty" science speaker program. The festival culminated in a two-day Grand Finale Expo on April 26–27, 2014, with Sneak Peek Friday on April 25, and the U.S. News STEM Solutions Conference on April 23–25. The third festival featured the first X-STEM Symposium. The new X-STEM Symposium- presented by Northrop Grumman Foundation - an Extreme STEM Symposium was conducted for middle and high school students on April 24. The second X-STEM Symposium was held as a stand-alone event in April 2015 and continues on an annual basis. X-STEM features interactive presentations aimed to inspire kids to pursue careers in STEM. X-STEM is open to students in grades 6-12. The Festival organizers are seeking to make X-STEM a national program with events across the country.

==== Attendees of the 2014 Festival ====
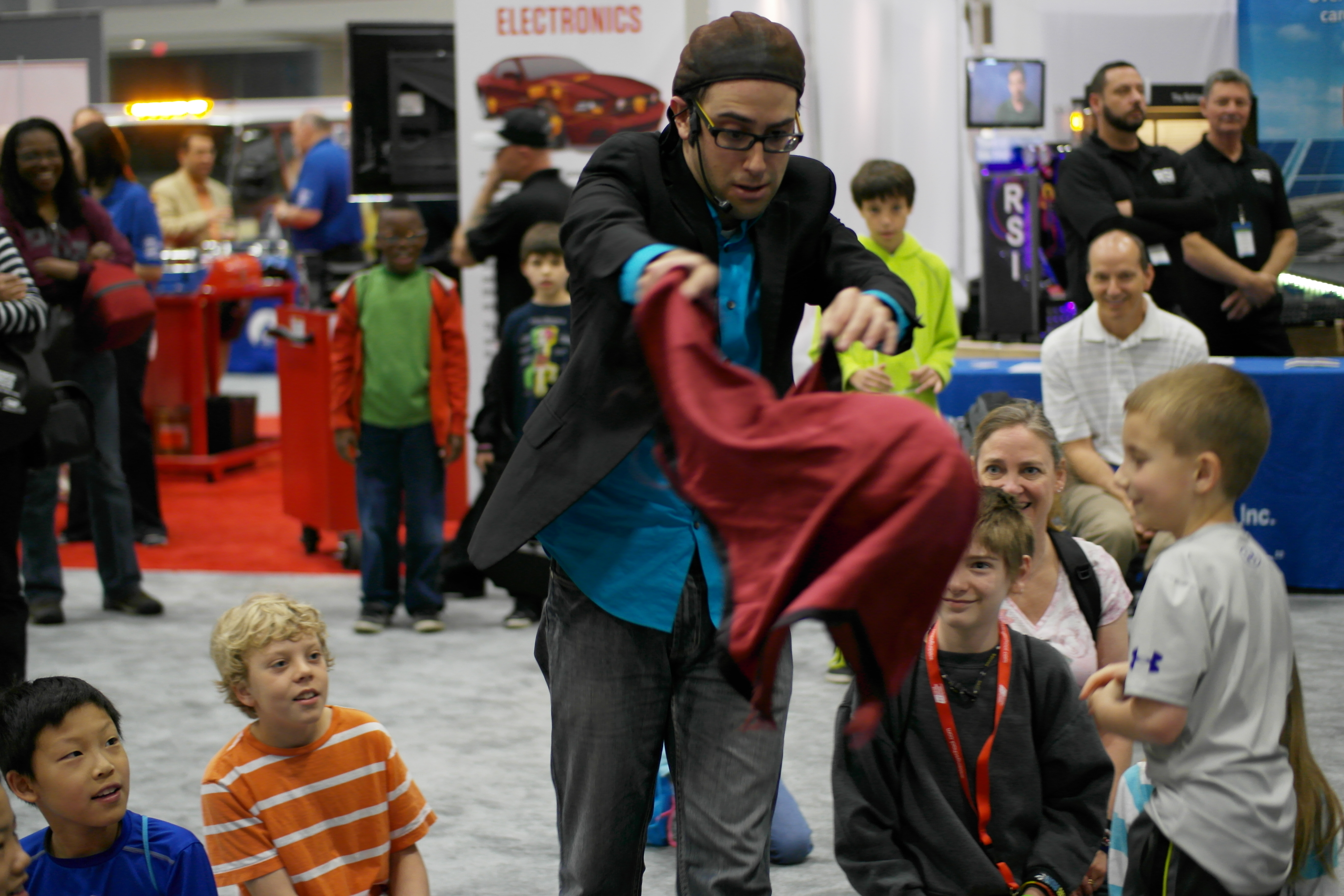
A presenter demonstrating at an exhibit.

The festival, like in previous years, took place at the Walter E. Washington Convention Center. Based on estimated numbers from the Convention Center, more than 325,000 people attended over the 4 days (X-STEM and Sneak Peek Friday included). Exhibitors stated that roughly 11,000 visitors stopped by their booth over the course of the three-day Expo. Attendees from all 50 states in the U.S. and international attendees from over 20 different countries visited the festival. Sneak Peek Friday included 40,000+ students, teachers, military families, government officials and press – a 30% increase from 2012. Sneak Peek Friday attendees included students from 38 states – and three countries. More than 4,000 students and teachers from area and underserved schools, homeschoolers, and military families attended the inaugural X-STEM Symposium.

=== 2016 Festival ===
The 4th USA Science & Engineering Festival culminated in a two–day Grand Finale Expo on April 16–17, 2016 at the Walter E. Washington Convention Center in Washington, D.C. Over 1,000 leading STEM organizations presented hands-on science and engineering activities. Sneak Peek Friday took place on April 15, 2016. The X-STEM Symposium was held as a stand-alone event on April 14, 2016, and featured presentations and workshops by leaders in science, technology, engineering and mathematics.

== Partners ==
Partners of the festival included the National Academy of Engineering, National Academy of Sciences, American Association for the Advancement of Science (AAAS), American Physical Society, American Chemical Society, Institute of Electrical and Electronics Engineers (IEEE), Association for Women in Science, Society of Hispanic Professional Engineers, National Society of Black Engineers, Harvard University, Massachusetts Institute of Technology, Princeton University, Georgetown University, University of California, San Diego, University of California, Berkeley, Johns Hopkins University, United States Naval Academy, Duke University, University of Maryland, J. Craig Venter Institute, Carnegie Institution for Science, National Institutes of Health (NIH), National Science Foundation (NSF), National Aeronautics and Space Administration (NASA), Office of Naval Research, U.S. Department of Energy, Air Force Research Laboratory, Lawrence Berkeley National Laboratory, Fermi National Accelerator Laboratory (Fermilab), Princeton Plasma Physics Laboratory, Lockheed Martin, Agilent Technologies, Google, Baxter International, ResMed, Hitachi, Smithsonian Institution, American Museum of Natural History, United States Botanic Garden, Marian Koshland Science Museum, For Inspiration and Recognition of Science and Technology (FIRST), Girls, Inc., Girl Scouts of the United States of America and Boy Scouts of America.

== See also ==
- List of festivals in the United States
