= Gianvito Martino =

Italian neuroscientist

Gianvito Martino (born 9 August 1962) is an Italian neuroscientist.

== Life and work ==
A native of Bergamo, Martino studied medicine and neurology at Pavia University and carried out periods of study and research at the Karolinska Institute in Stockholm and at the University of Chicago.

He is the current Director of the Division of Neuroscience of San Raffaele Hospital in Milan, he teaches biology at the Vita-Salute San Raffaele University and is honorary professor at the Queen Mary University of London.

He is one of the founders of BergamoScienza and the author of several scientific publications in top international journals.

For the Editrice San Raffaele (San Raffaele Press) he has edited, along with Edoardo Boncinelli, the book

- Il cervello. La scatola delle meraviglie (The brain. Box of delights) (2008)

and published

- La medicina che rigenera. Non siamo nati per invecchiare (Regenerative medicine. We were not born to grow old) (2009)
- Identità e Mutamento. La biologia in bilico (Identity and Change. Biology poised) (2010), winner of the tenth edition of Fermi Award-Città di Cecina for science popularization.
