= Jastrow =

Jastrow may refer to:

- Jastrowie (German: Jastrow), a town in Poland

As a surname, it may refer to:

- Elisabeth Jastrow (1890–1981), German-born classical archaeologist
- Ignaz Jastrow (1856–1937), German economist and historian
- Joseph Jastrow (1863–1944), Polish–American psychologist
- Julie Jastrow, American terrestrial ecologist
- Marcus Jastrow (1829–1903), Prussian-born American Orthodox Jewish rabbi and Talmudist
  - Morris Jastrow, Jr. (1861–1921), Polish–American Orientalist, son of Marcus
- Robert Jastrow (1925–2008), American astronomer and planetary physicist
- Otto Jastrow (born 1942), German Arabist and Syriacist

As a book, it may refer to:

- The famous work of Marcus Jastrow: Dictionary of the Targumim, Talmud Bavli, Talmud Yerushalmi, and Midrashic Literature

== See also ==
- Jastrow illusion
