= Sarcone =

Sarcone is a surname. Notable people with the surname include:

- C. Robert Sarcone (1925–2020), American politician
- Gianni A. Sarcone (born 1962), Italian visual artist and science writer

== See also ==
- Zarcone
