= Lily K. Donaldson =

Beauty pageant winner

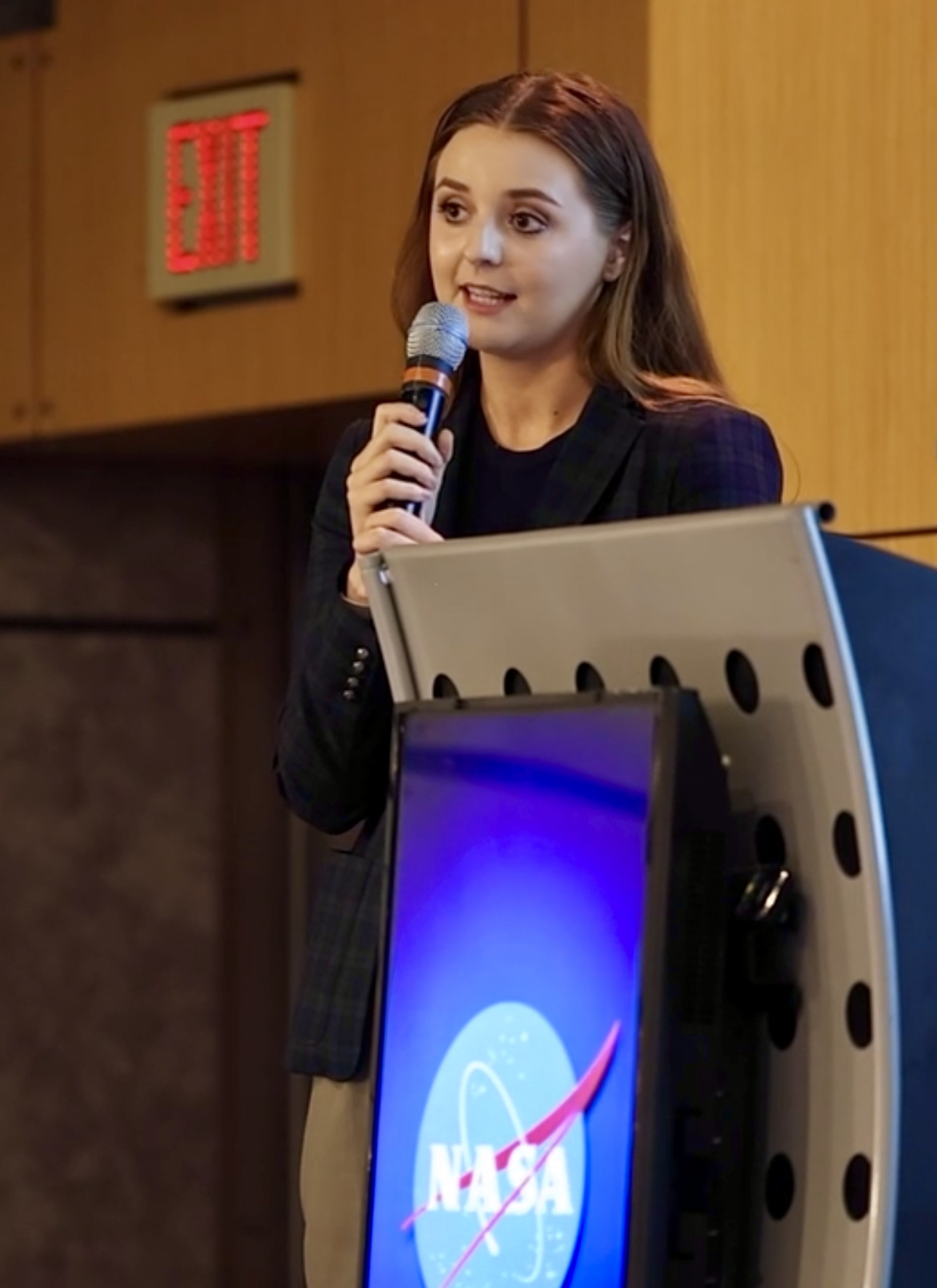
- Born: 1999 (age 26–27); Indianapolis, Indiana, U.S
- Education: American University (BS); Rensselaer Polytechnic Institute (MS); Rensselaer Polytechnic Institute (PhD) (current)
- Occupation: Ph.D. Candidate
- Beauty pageant titleholder
- Title: Miss United States 2022; Miss New York US 2022; Miss Tennessee US 2021
- Years active: 2015-2023
- Major competition: Miss United States 2022 (Winner)
- Website: www.lilykdonaldson.com

Lily K. Donaldson (born 1999) is an American beauty pageant titleholder who won Miss United States 2022. She was the first Miss United States to visit all 50 states during her reign. Donaldson was crowned Miss United States 2022 in her hometown Memphis, Tennessee on October 16, 2022.

== Early life and education ==
Donaldson was born in Indianapolis, Indiana and grew up in Memphis, Tennessee. She has a twin sister. Donaldson attended McCordsville Elementary School in Indianapolis, Newburgh Elementary School in Newburgh, Indiana, Bon Lin Middle School in Bartlett, Tennessee, and Bolton High School. Donaldson participated in student theatre and student journalism programs while growing up. She participated in the International Baccalaureate Diploma Programme.

As of 2023, Donaldson is a Ph.D. candidate at Rensselaer Polytechnic Institute studying controlled environment agriculture within a School of Architecture built ecologies program. Donaldson has a Bachelor of Science in Computer Science from American University and a Master of Science in lighting from Rensselaer Polytechnic Institute. While at American University, she worked in vision scientist Arthur Shapiro's lab.

== STEM and arts education advocacy ==
Donaldson directs a nonprofit based in Memphis, Tennessee called Art Technically which promotes STEM (Science, Technology, Engineering, and Math) and Arts education for disadvantaged students at Title 1 and rural K-12 schools. She founded Art Technically after attending Title 1 schools with underserved arts and science programs. Art Technically provides disadvantaged K-12 students with free STEM and Arts workshops, free STEM and STEAM books, STEM and Arts themed toy donations including teddy bears in scientist costumes, or "Science Bears", and a program called Love Letters, where students learn to code Valentine's Day cards for Meals on Wheels programs. Art Technically has also hosted a science-journalism program for students funded by Society for Science in 2022.

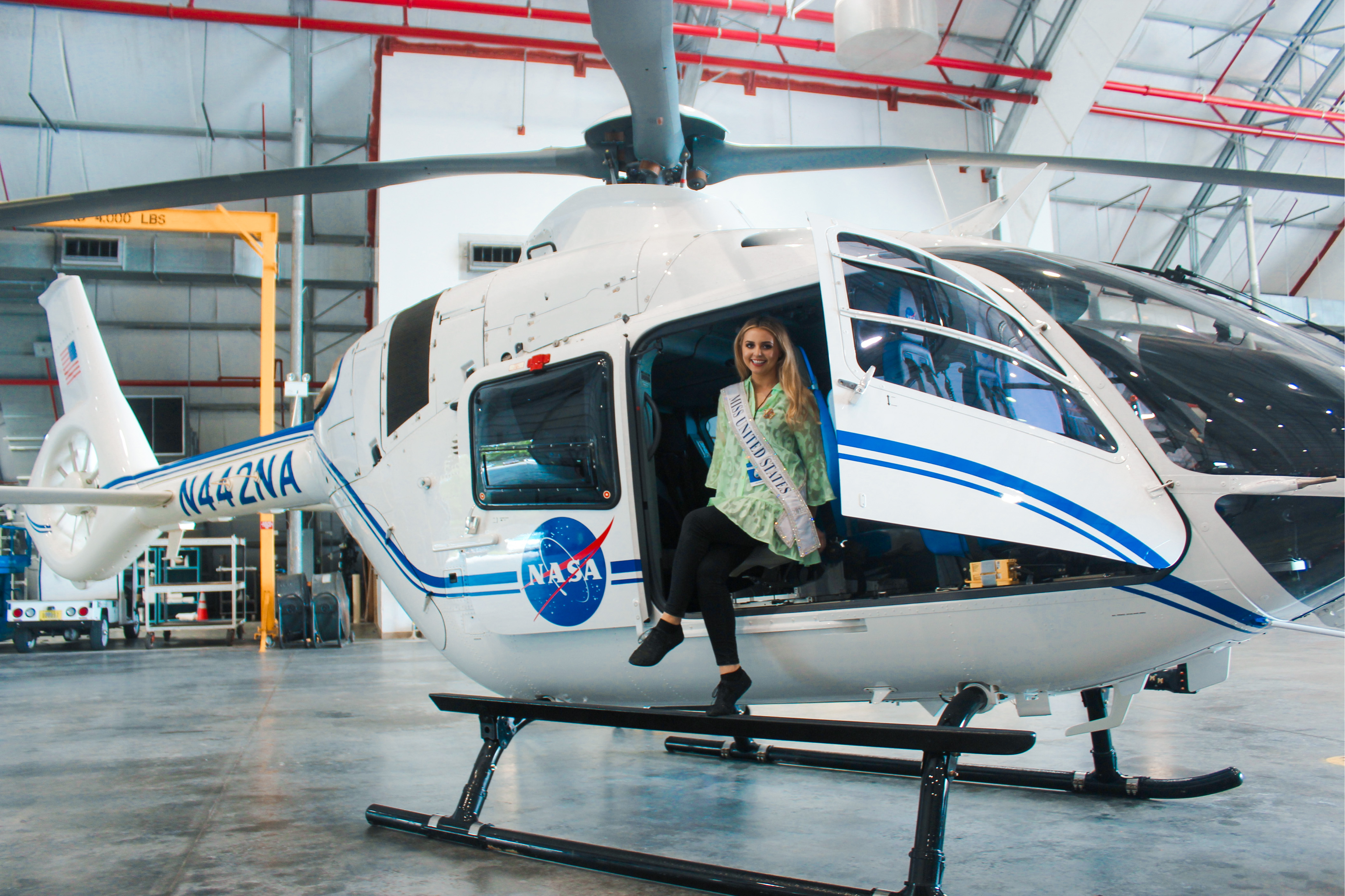
Miss United States 2022, Lily K. Donaldson, sits in a NASA helicopter during a tour of Kennedy Space Center to promote STEM education.

In 2022, Donaldson wrote an article about her work with Art Technically for the United States Department of Education. In 2023, Donaldson led an event with NASA where students at Brighton Elementary School in Tipton County, Tennessee asked questions of astronauts onboard the International Space Station. In 2024, Donaldson gave a keynote on the importance of STEM education at the AI Expo for National Competitiveness in Washington, DC.

== Civil service ==
While she was an undergraduate student at American University, Donaldson worked for the United States Department of Homeland Security as a student trainee, under grant from the NASA DC Space Grant Consortium, and on a capstone project with the United States Department of Energy.

In 2023, Donaldson became a research assistant at NASA's Climate Change Research Initiative at the Goddard Institute for Space Studies. The program has educators and graduate students work directly with NASA scientists to lead research teams in a NASA research project related to climate change. While at GISS, Donaldson led an ISS downlink with NASA where students at Brighton Elementary School in Tipton County, Tennessee asked questions to astronauts aboard the International Space Station, taught solar eclipse programming and distributed eclipse glasses to students in Auburn, New York, and hosted an astrobotany workshop for students at Rensselaer Polytechnic Institute's Black Families Technology Awareness Day.

== Pageantry ==
Donaldson has held the titles of Miss Memphis US 2021, Miss Tennessee US 2021, Miss New York US 2022, and Miss United States 2022. On October 16, 2022, Donaldson was crowned Miss United States at the Cannon Center for the Performing Arts in Memphis, Tennessee. At Miss United States 2021, while representing Tennessee, Donaldson was second runner-up and received the People's Choice award.

Donaldson has also held the titles of Miss Mid-South's Miss America's Outstanding Teen 2015 (Tennessee), Miss Tipton County's Outstanding Teen 2016 (Tennessee), Miss District of Columbia State Finalist 2018 and 2019, and Miss Franklin County 2022 (Tennessee). She performed Irish dance for her talent and won awards for charitable fundraising and was third place at the Women in Business interview award at Miss Tennessee 2022 and the STEM Award at Miss District of Columbia 2019.

Donaldson competed at Miss District of Columbia USA 2020 and reached the top 12.

=== Miss United States ===
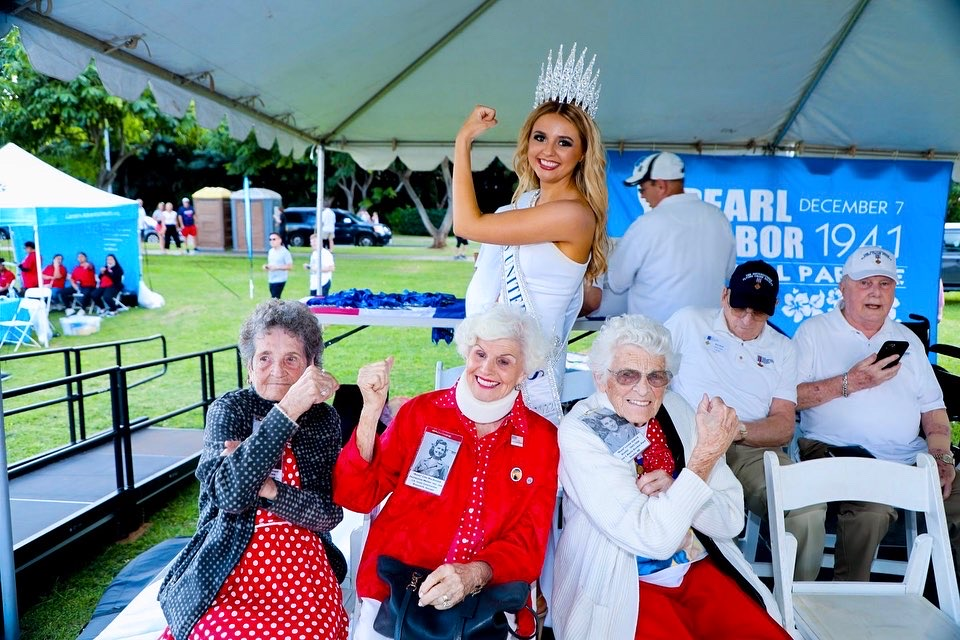
Donaldson with WWII Rosies at the Pearl Harbor Memorial Parade

Donaldson won Miss United States 2022 in her hometown, Memphis, Tennessee on October 16, 2022. She was the first Miss United States to visit all 50 states during her reign. During her year as Miss United States, Donaldson guest-wrote an article about her work with Art Technically for the U.S. Department of Education and was named to the Memphis Flyer newsweekly's 2023 Memphis 20 under 30 list.

Awards and achievements
| Preceded by Samantha Keene Anderson, Arizona | Miss United States; 2022 | Succeeded by Addison Grace Hadley, Tennessee |
