= North Carolina Science Festival =

- Abbreviation: NCSF
- Formation: September 11, 2010; 16 years ago
- Purpose: STEM outreach and education
- Headquarters: Chapel Hill, North Carolina
- Region served: North Carolina
- Parent organization: Morehead Planetarium and Science Center, University of North Carolina at Chapel Hill
- Affiliations: USA Science and Engineering Festival
- Website: www.ncsciencefestival.org

The North Carolina Science Festival (NCSF) is a month-long, yearly celebration encompassing hundreds of events throughout the state of North Carolina. The festival is organized by Morehead Planetarium and Science Center on the University of North Carolina at Chapel Hill campus with the goal of highlighting the educational, cultural and economic impact of science in the state. NCSF events include hands-on activities, talks, lab tours, exhibits and performances for all ages. The event has grown into the largest science festival in the world.

== History ==
=== 2010 ===
The first North Carolina Science Festival was held Sept. 11–26, 2010, featuring Bugfest at the North Carolina Museum of Natural Sciences as its kick-off event. The festival coordinated with the USA Science and Engineering Festival and Observe the Moon night

The festivals activities were hosted by museums and universities, others were hosted by businesses with science connections. The state's wine industry was showcased in events featuring the science of winemaking. The University of North Carolina hosted Jamie Hyneman and Adam Savage of MythBusters for a program at the Smith Center with nearly 5,000 in attendance. East Carolina University and Go-Science hosted more than 2,000 participants for the Eastern Regional Science Expo with exhibitions and demonstrations. The festival concluded with the UNC Science Expo at the University of North Carolina at Chapel Hill.

The inaugural festival in 2010 included events at 89 participating organizations, with 22 percent of these programs in the mountain region, 63 percent in the piedmont region and 15 percent in the coastal region. As of Oct. 7, 2010, 60 host organizations had already reported attendance for 98 events totalling 89,494 participants.

Sponsors for the 2010 North Carolina Science Festival were Burroughs Wellcome Fund, Time Warner Cable and SAS (platinum level); Biogen Idec, Lenovo, Magellan Science, The News & Observer and UNC Health Care (gold level); Inspire Pharmaceuticals, NC STEM Community Collaborative and UNC School of Education (silver level); BB&T, The Research Triangle Park, Life Technologies Foundation, Dr. Nicholas B. Duck and family and the NC GlaxoSmithKline Foundation.

Governor Roy Cooper proclaims April as STEM Education Month at the beginning of the 2017 festival

=== Later festivals ===
Following the inaugural North Carolina Science Festival, organizers and board members moved the festival's annual schedule from fall to spring. The second North Carolina Science Festival was held April 13–29, 2012, again offering a series of science expos, guest speakers, tours, activities and other events across the state.

Signature events included presentations by Neil deGrasse Tyson at UNC-Chapel Hill and by Adam Savage and Jamie Hyneman at UNC-Charlotte Signature events in 2013 included presentations by Alton Brown in Durham and Charlotte as well as a State Wide Star Party at 45 sites across the state.

The 2017 festival was kicked off by Apollo 13 astronaut Jim Lovell and a proclamation by Roy Cooper naming April STEM Education Month in the state. The 2017 festival also marked the first year with events in each of North Carolina's 100 counties.

Year	Dates	Notes	Number of Events	Total Participants
2010	September 11–26	First statewide science festival in the nation	413	85,860
2012	April 13–29		566	233,750
2013	April 5–21	Debut of the Statewide Star Party	677	151,678
2014	March 28 – April 14		401	333,789
2015	April 10–26	The Festival welcomed its one-millionth participant	960	380,203
2016	April 8–24	Hosted event in every NC State Park	918	410,935
2017	April 7–23	Every county in the state participated	850	240,139
2018	April 1–30	First month-long festival, welcomed two-millionth participant	936	444,966
2019	April 1–30		362	118,122
2020	April 1–30	Virtual due to the COVID-19 pandemic	n/a	n/a
2021	April 1–30		842	92,850
2022	April 1–30	Welcomed three-millionth participant	327	135,403
2023	April 1–30		Over 400	not found
2024	April 1–30		1,047	196,861
2025	April 1–30		1,291	185,361
2026	April 1–30		487	154,887
