= Jastrow illusion =

Optical illusion

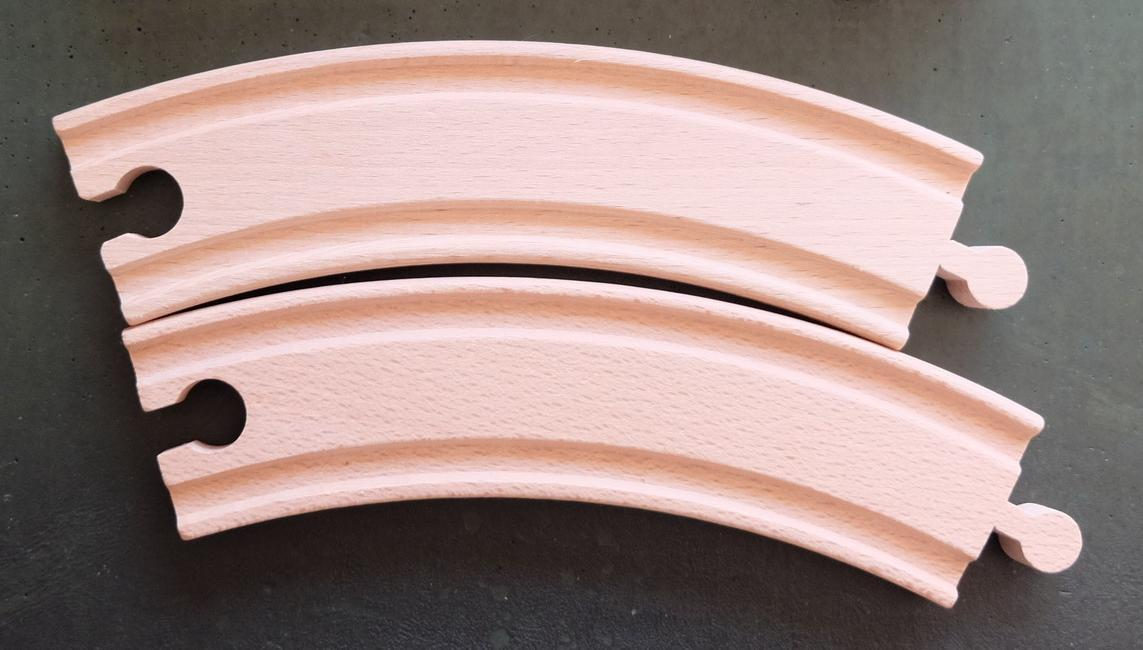
Identical toy railway tracks as a real example of a Jastrow illusion

The Jastrow illusion is an optical illusion attributed to the Polish-American psychologist Joseph Jastrow. This optical illusion is known under different names: Ring-Segment illusion, Jastrow illusion, Wundt Area illusion, Wundt-Jastrow illusion, or the Boomerang Illusion.

The illusion also occurs in the real world. The two toy railway tracks pictured are identical, although the lower one appears to be larger. There are three competing theories on how this illusion occurs.

This illusion is often included in magic kits and several versions are sold in magic shops, where it is commonly known under the name Boomerang Illusion.

== Origin ==
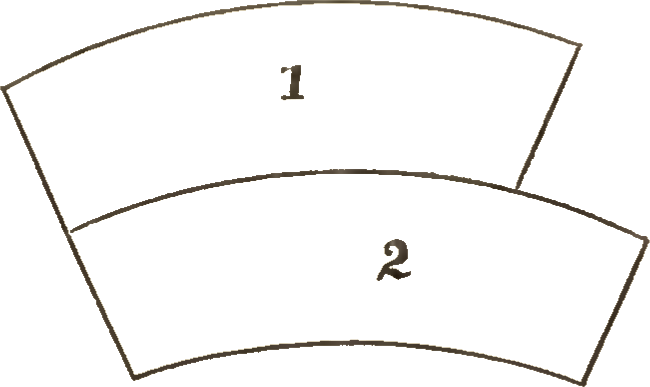
The World of Wonders.

The oldest reference to this illusion can be found in The World of Wonders, an 1873 book about curiosities of nature, science and art. The two arches are placed on top of each other. They are similar in size, but not the same. The inner radius of the upper arch is the same as the outer radius of the lower arch.

The first psychologist to describe this illusion was German psychologist Franz Müller-Lyer in 1889. His article presents a collection of geometrical illusions of size, including what is now known as the Müller-Lyer illusion. His paper also includes the ring segments which we now know as the Jastrow Illusion.

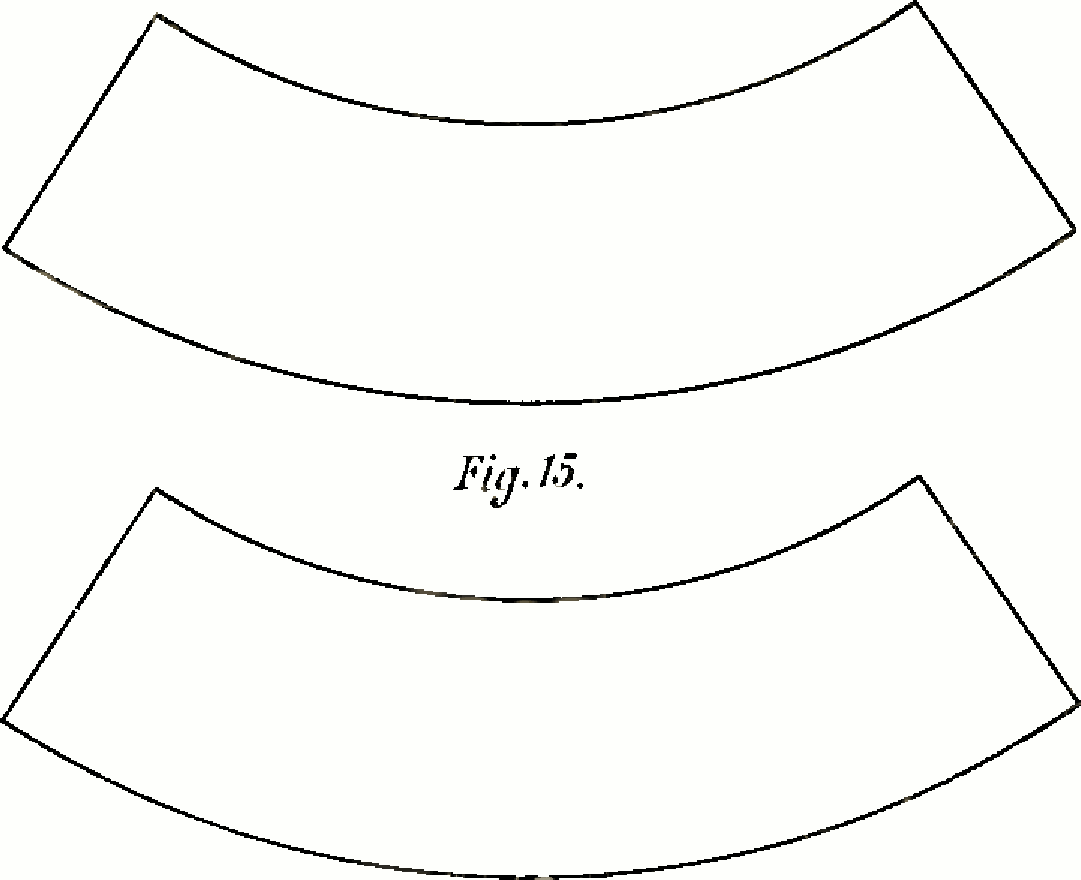
Wundt Area Illusion.

Joseph Jastrow extensively researched optical illusions, the most prominent of them being the rabbit–duck illusion, an image that can be interpreted as being both a rabbit or a duck. In 1892 he published a paper which introduced his version of what is now known as the Jastrow illusion. His version is different from the commonly used figure because the two arches taper to one end.

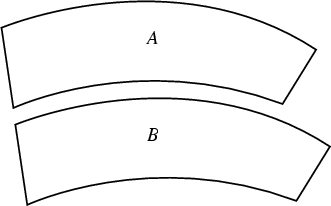
Jastrow Illusion.

On the other side of the Atlantic, German scientist Wilhelm Wundt was also pioneering in psychology research. He wrote one of the first books about geometric optical illusions in which he copied the design previously published by Müller-Lyer.

== Cause ==
It's unclear why this illusion happens, but there are several competing explanations of why the brain perceives the difference in size between the ring segments, none of which has been accepted as definitive.

One explanation relates to how the mind interprets the two-dimensional images on the retina as a three-dimensional world. Another explanation relates to the fact that the mind can only attend to a small field of vision, which is reconstructed by our consciousness. The most commonly used explanation is that the brain is confused by the difference in size between the large and the small radius. The short side makes the long side appear longer, and the long side makes the short side appear even shorter.

== Similarity to other optical illusions ==
The Jastrow illusion has been compared with other optical illusions, such as the Fat Face illusion, the Leaning Tower illusion and the Ponzo illusion.

Masaki Tomonaga, a researcher at Kyoto University, compared the Jastrow Illusion with the so-called Fat Face Illusion. He conducted experiments with people and chimpanzees to compare this illusion with the classical Jastrow Illusion. Animals are known to observe many of the same optical illusions as humans do, but this was the first study to demonstrate that the Jastrow illusion is also experienced by chimpanzees. The Fat Face illusion happens when two identical images of the same face are aligned vertically, the face at the bottom appears fatter. The effect is much smaller than the Jastrow Illusion, with a size difference of only four percent. The experiment showed that both humans and chimpanzees were fooled by the Jastrow Illusion. As a comparison, none of the subjects picked the wrong rectangle. Human subjects showed a strong Fat Face illusion, but chimpanzees did not perceive the top face as being thinner.

== Perception research ==
Japanese psychologist Shogu Imai experimented with different versions of the Wundt Illusion in 1960 to find out which combination of measurements creates the strongest illusion. He varied the inner and outer radius, the opening angle of the segment, and the angle of the ends. He also looked at whether the distance between the two shapes, or whether they are horizontally or vertically influences the strength of the illusion. Imai showed different versions of the illusion to a group of people and asked them to rate the perceived difference in size. Imai found that the maximum reported difference was about ten percent. He also found that the inner radius should be 60% of the outer radius to achieve the maximum effect. The ideal opening angle was found to be 80 degrees. The cut angle is most effective at zero degrees, which occurs when the line extends through the centre of the circle segments. He also found that the illusion is strongest when the segments are horizontal and that the ideal distance is just above each other. Overlapping the segments or moving them too far apart destroys the illusion.

Manfredo Massironi and his colleagues from the universities of Rome and Verona modified the Jastrow illusion to develop a diagnostic test for unilateral spatial neglect. People that suffer from neglect do not experience the illusion when the overlapping part of the segments is on the side where their perception is missing. When the segments are reversed, they perceive the illusion in the same way as people that do not suffer from neglect.

Researchers have also examined the susceptibility of people with autism to a range of optical illusions. This research seems to indicate that people with autism don't experience visual size illusions. This finding is consistent with the idea that autism involves an excessive focus on details. These findings have recently been contradicted. Recent research, which included the Jastrow illusion, placed these findings in doubt.

The Jastrow illusion has been used to see whether young children are deceived by geometric optical illusions. Researchers used ring segments that were not equal in size so they could simulate both illusionary and real size differences. They showed the two segments in three configurations. The smaller shaded smaller segment was placed on top to emphasise the difference in size. In the other positions, the smaller piece was placed below or above the larger piece to create the illusion it is bigger. The children were asked to play a game called "Big and Little" and point out which segment was really bigger than the other. In a second version of the test the kids were asked to point out which one looks bigger. The results show that children from the age of five are capable of distinguishing between real differences in size and an apparent difference.
