= Best Illusion of the Year Contest =

- Awarded for: Contributions that promote public understanding of illusory perception and cognition
- Country: United States
- Presented by: Neural Correlate Society
- First award: 2005
- Website: illusionoftheyear.com

The Best Illusion of the Year Contest is an annual recognition of the world's illusion creators awarded by the Neural Correlate Society. The contest was created in 2005 by professors Susana Martinez-Conde and Stephen Macknik as part of the European conference on Visual Perception in La Coruna, Spain. It has since transitioned to an online contest where everyone in the world is invited to submit illusions and vote for the winner.

The contest decides on the most impressive perceptual or cognitive illusion of the year (unpublished, or published no earlier than the year prior to the most recent competition). An illusion is a perceptual or cognitive experience that does not match the physical reality (e.g. the perception of motion where no such motion physically exists).

As human experience is generated indirectly by brain mechanisms that interact with the physical reality, the study of illusions offers insight into the neural bases of perception and cognition. The community includes neuroscientists, ophthalmologists, neurologists, and visual artists that create illusions to help discover the neural underpinnings of illusory perception.

The Best Illusion of the Year Contest consists of three stages: submission, initial review, and voting of winners. The initial review is conducted by a panel of judges who are world experts in the science, art, and science education. The judge panel narrows the submissions to the Top Ten finalists, and viewers from all over the world can vote for the winner online. The top three winners receive cash awards.

== Neural Correlate Society ==
The Neural Correlate Society (NCS) is a nonprofit 501(c)3 organization that promotes research into the neural basis of perception and cognition. The organization serves a community of neuroscientists, ophthalmologists, neurologists, and artists who use a variety of methods to help discover the underpinnings of the human experience.

The NCS hosts a variety of events, including the Best Illusion of the Year Contest, that highlight important new discoveries to the public.

== The Illusions ==
=== Award recipients ===
The following table details the first, second, and third place recipients from each year of the contest since its inception.

Year	First place	Second place	Third place
2005	Title: Motion Illusion Building Blocks; Created by: Arthur Shapiro & Justin Charles	Title: Two-Stroke Apparent Motion; Created by: George Mather	Title: Elusive Arch; Created by: Dejan Todorović
2006	Title: The Freezing Rotation Illusion; Created by: Max Dürsteler	Title: The Infinite Regression Illusion; Created by: Peter Tse	Title:The Bar-Cross-Ellipse Illusion; Created by: Gideon Caplovitz & Peter Tse
2007	Title: The Leaning Tower Illusion; Created by: Frederick Kingdom, Ali Yoonessi, & Elena Gheorghiu	Title: The Illusory Contoured Tilting Pyramid; Created by: Pietro Guardini & Luciano Gamberini	Title: Where Has All the Motion Gone? Created by: Arthur Shapiro & Emily Knight
2008	Title: Filling in the Afterimage After the Image; Created by: Rob van Lier & Mark Vergeer	Title: Ghostly Gaze; Created by: Rob Jenkins	Title: Rolling Eyes on a Hollow Mask; Created by: Thomas Papathomas
2009	Title: The Break of the Curveball; Created by: Arthur Shapiro, Zhong-Lin Lu, Emily Knight, & Robert Ennis	Title: Color Dove Illusion; Created by: Yuval Barkan & Hedva Spitzer	Title: The Illusion of Sex; Created by: Richard Russell
2010	Title: Impossible Motion: Magnet Slopes; Created by: Kokichi Sugihara	Title: Counter-Intuitive Illusory Contours; Created by: Bart Anderson	Title: Two Sinusoids: 6-1 Perceptions; Created by: Jan Kremlacek
2011	Title: Silencing Awareness of Change by Background Information; Created by: Jordan Suchow & George Alvarez	Title: Grouping by Contrast; Created by: Erica Dixon, Arthur Shapiro, & Kai Hamburger	Title: The Loch Ness Aftereffect; Created by: Mark Wexler
2012	Title: The Disappearing Hand Trick; Created by: Roger Newport, Helen Gilpin, & Catherine Preston	Title: When Pretty Girls Turn Ugly: The Flashed Face Distortion Effect; Created by: Jason Tangen, Sean Murphy, & Matthew Thompson	Title: Color Wagon Wheel; Created by: Arthur Shapiro, William Kistler, & Alex Rose-Henig
2013	Title: Rotation Generated by Translation; Created by: Jun Ono, Akiyasu Tomoeda, & Kokichi Sugihara	Title: Tusi or not Tusi; Created by: Arthur Shapiro & Alex Rose-Henig	Title: Through the Eyes of Giants; Created by: Arash Afraz & Ken Nakayama
2014	Title: The Dynamic Ebbinghaus; Created by: Christopher D. Blair, Gideon P. Caplovitz, and Ryan E.B. Mruczek	Title: Flexible Colors; Created by: Mark Vergeer, Stuart Anstis, and Rob van Lier	Title: A Turn in the Road; Created by: Kimberley D. Orsten & James R. Pomerantz
2015	Title: Splitting Colors; Created by: Mark Vergeer	Title: Ambiguous Garage Roof; Created by: Kokichi Sugihara	Title: The Day it Rained on Lowry; Created by: Michael Pickard
2016	Title: Motion Integration Unleashed: New Tricks for an Old Dog; Created by: Mathew T. Harrison and Gideon P. Caplovitz	Title: Ambiguous Cylinder Illusion; Created by: Kokichi Sugihara	Title: Silhouette Zoetrope; Created by: Christine Veras
2017	Title: Shape from motion only Created by: Hedva Spitzer, Dana Tearosh, Niv Weisman	Title: Skye Blue Café Wall Illusion; Created by: Victoria Skye	Title: Dynamic Müller-Lyer Illusion; Created by: Gianni A. Sarcone
2018	Title: Triply Ambiguous Object; Created by: Kokichi Sugihara	Title: Movement Illusion with a Twist; Created by: David Phillips, Priscilla Heard and Christopher Tyler	Title: The Worm’s Eye View Illusion; Created by: Michael Pickard and Gurpreet Singh
2019	Title: Dual Axis Illusion; Created by: Frank Force	Title: Change the Color; Created by: Haruaki Fukuda	Title: The Rotating Circles Illusion; Created by: Ryan E.B. Mruczek and Gideon Paul Caplovitz
2020	Title: 3D Schröder Staircase; Created by: Kokichi Sugihara	Title: The Real Thing?? Created by: Matt Pritchard	Title: Impossible grid typography Created by: Daniël Maarleveld
2021	Title: The Phantom Queen; Created by: Matt Pritchard	Title: The Changing Room Illusion; Created by: Michael A. Cohen	Title: The Double Ring Illusion; Created by: Dawei Bai & Brent Strickland
2023	Title: Platform 9 3/4s Created by: Matt Pritchard	Title: Tower of Cubes? Created by: John Salmon	Title: Cornelia; Created by: Wendy van Boxtel
2024	Title: The Static Spin; Created by: Saleeta Qadir and Bernhard Egger	Title: Dollusion; Created by: Duška Milosavljević	Title: Tri-form Prism; Created by: Hiroaki Hamanaka, Ryohei Miki, Kyota Yamamoto
