= Gianni A. Sarcone =

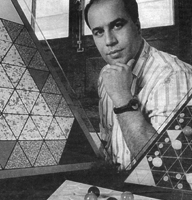
- Born: 20 March 1962 (age 64); Vevey, Switzerland
- Occupations: Visual artist and writer
- Known for: Op art, optical illusions, visual creativity, and recreational mathematics
- Website: www.giannisarcone.com

Gianni A. Sarcone (born March 20, 1962) is a visual artist and author who collaborates with educational publications, writing articles and columns on topics related to art, science, and mathematics education. He has contributed to several science magazines, including Focus Junior (Italy), Query-CICAP (Italy), Rivista Magia (Italy), Alice & Bob / Bocconi University (Italy), Brain Games (USA), and Tangente (France). Sarcone has over 30 years of experience as a designer and researcher in the areas of visual creativity, recreational mathematics and educational games.

== Visual research ==
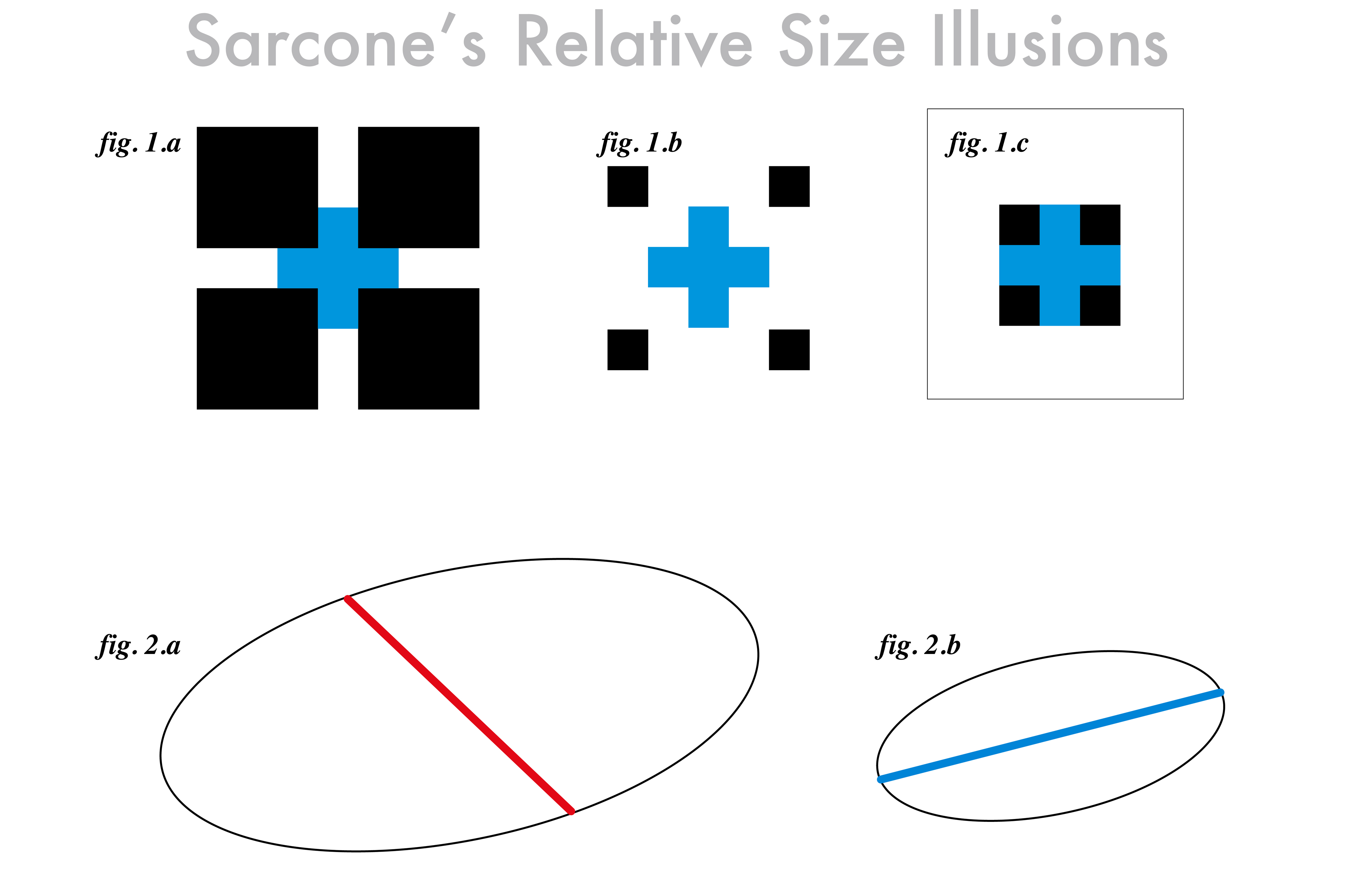
Here are two relative size illusions described by Italian visual researcher Gianni A. Sarcone in 1997 and 2013. The first relative-size illusion called Sarcone's Crosses contradicts Ebbinghaus illusion (aka Titchener Circles, 1898) and Obonai square illusion (1954). Sarcone's cross illusion consists of a cross (the test shape) surrounded by sets of squares of distinct size (the inducing shapes). As shown in the diagram, the three blue crosses in fig. 1.a, 1.b and 1.c are exactly the same size; the one on the left (fig. 1.a), however, appears larger. The illusion works even when the small squares completely occlude the blue cross (see fig. 1.c). In conclusion, there isn't always correlation between the size of the surrounding shapes and the relative size perception of the test shape. In fig. 2.a and 2.b, by effect of assimilation, the diagonal red line within the large ellipse seems subjectively longer, but in fact the blue line is objectively the longest of both lines.

Considered a leading authority on visual perception by academic institutions, Sarcone was invited to serve as a juror at the Third Annual "Best Illusion of the Year Contest" held in Sarasota, Florida (USA). His optical illusion projects 'Mask of Love' and 'Autokinetic Illusion' were named among the top 10 best optical illusions in the 2011 and 2014 "Best Illusion of the Year Contests", respectively. In 2017, he placed third in the contest for his ‘Dynamic Müller-Lyer Illusion’.

Amongst other notable projects, he created and designed an “hypnoptical” visual illusion that was used in the logo and institutional signage of the 2014 Grec Festival of Barcelona, a significant cultural event featuring avant-garde musical, dance, and theater performances.

His joint work, “Moona Lisa”, a mosaic of lunar images that, when viewed from a distance, forms the iconic portrait of Leonardo da Vinci's Mona Lisa, was featured as NASA’s Astronomy Picture of the Day (APOD) twice: on October 16, 2021, and again on September 14, 2024, in celebration of International Observe the Moon Night.

Since May 16, 2022, in honor of the International Day of Light established by UNESCO, the University of Florence (UniFi) has permanently hosted Sarcone's optical art works in the Department of Physics and Astronomy in Sesto Fiorentino. This exhibition, titled “Enlightening Mind”, is freely accessible and organized by the Degree Course in Optics and Optometry.

== Honors and awards ==
Award	Organization	Year	Result
Best Illusion of the Year 2011	Best Illusion of the Year Contest	2011	Top Ten Finalist
Best Illusion of the Year 2014	Best Illusion of the Year Contest	2014	Top Ten Finalist
Best Illusion of the Year 2017	Best Illusion of the Year Contest	2017	Won
Royal Society Young People's Book Prize 2018	Royal Society Prizes for Science Books	2018	Won
Best Illusion of the Year 2019	Best Illusion of the Year Contest	2019	Top Ten Finalist

== Educational project ==
G. Sarcone has authored and published numerous educational textbooks and illustrated books in English, French and Italian on brain training and the mechanism of vision. He is the founder of Archimedes-lab.org a consulting network of experts specializing in improving and enhancing creativity - for which he has been commended with a long list of accolades and awards, including the 2003 Scientific American Sci/Tech Web Award in Mathematics and received recognition in the US from: CNN Headline News, National Council of Teachers of Mathematics (NCTM), and NewScientist.com.

== Notable inventions ==
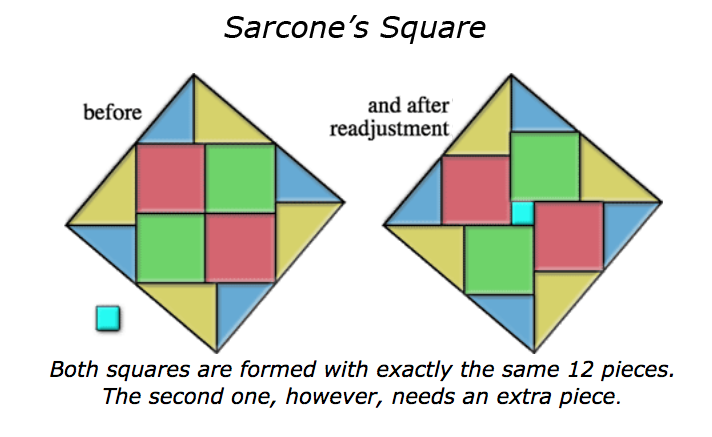
Sarcone's Puzzle (also known as Puzzle Quirinus or the Quadrix Puzzle), invented by Gianni Sarcone. A geometrically paradoxical puzzle made of 12 pieces.

Sarcone has developed a number of visual puzzles, games, and conceptual objects that combine elements of geometry, color, perception, and philosophical reflection, often grounded in mathematical principles.

- Quirinus – The Amazing Paradoxical Puzzle (1992) – A 16-piece geometric puzzle from the *Quadrix* series that presents a vanishing-area paradox: an additional square appears to fit within a completed shape without altering its perceived dimensions.
- TangraMagic Puzzle – A reimagined ten-piece tangram that introduces L-shaped elements and a small square to produce an optical illusion of area disappearance. The puzzle includes a 20-page illustrated booklet designed for educational and recreational use.
- Trama – A two-player abstract strategy game designed in the early 1990s. Played on a triangular board with black, white, and neutral gray pieces, the game introduces a shared neutral component that adds a layer of tactical depth.
- Architempo – The Hological Watch – A conceptual watch using a two-color pattern to visually represent the passage of time in an hourglass-like display. Conceived in the late 1980s, the design explores alternative ways of perceiving time through graphical interaction.

== Media and broadcasting ==
Some of Sarcone's artworks such as The Other Face of Paris or Flashing Star have gone viral on the Internet. His works were also presented in several national and international television programs, including 'Rai 3' Italy, 'RTL 9 Channel' France, 'TSR 1 Channel' Switzerland, and in the following TV series:

- ‘Nippon Television Network’ / NTV (Japan): "Fukashigi"; Japanese: 不可思議探偵団 (2012).
- ‘National Geographic Television’ (US): "Brain Games Science" (2014).
- ‘Beyond Production’ PTY LTD (Australia): "Wild But True" – Season 1 (2014).
- "Masahiro Nakai’s Useful Library"; Japanese: 中居正広の身になる図書館, a widely followed Japanese TV program (June, 2015).

== Selected works ==
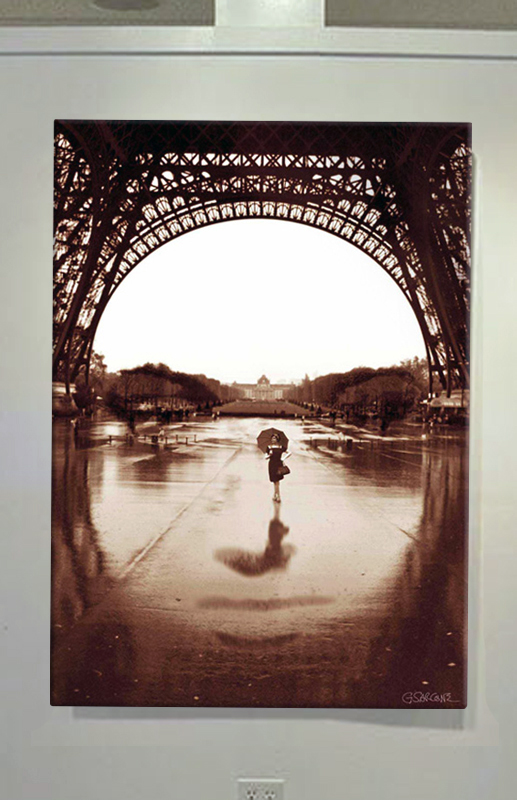
Gianni Sarcone, 1998, The Other Face of Paris (aka The Eiffel Girl), photograph, 66 x 91 cm, Private collection, Paris (France).

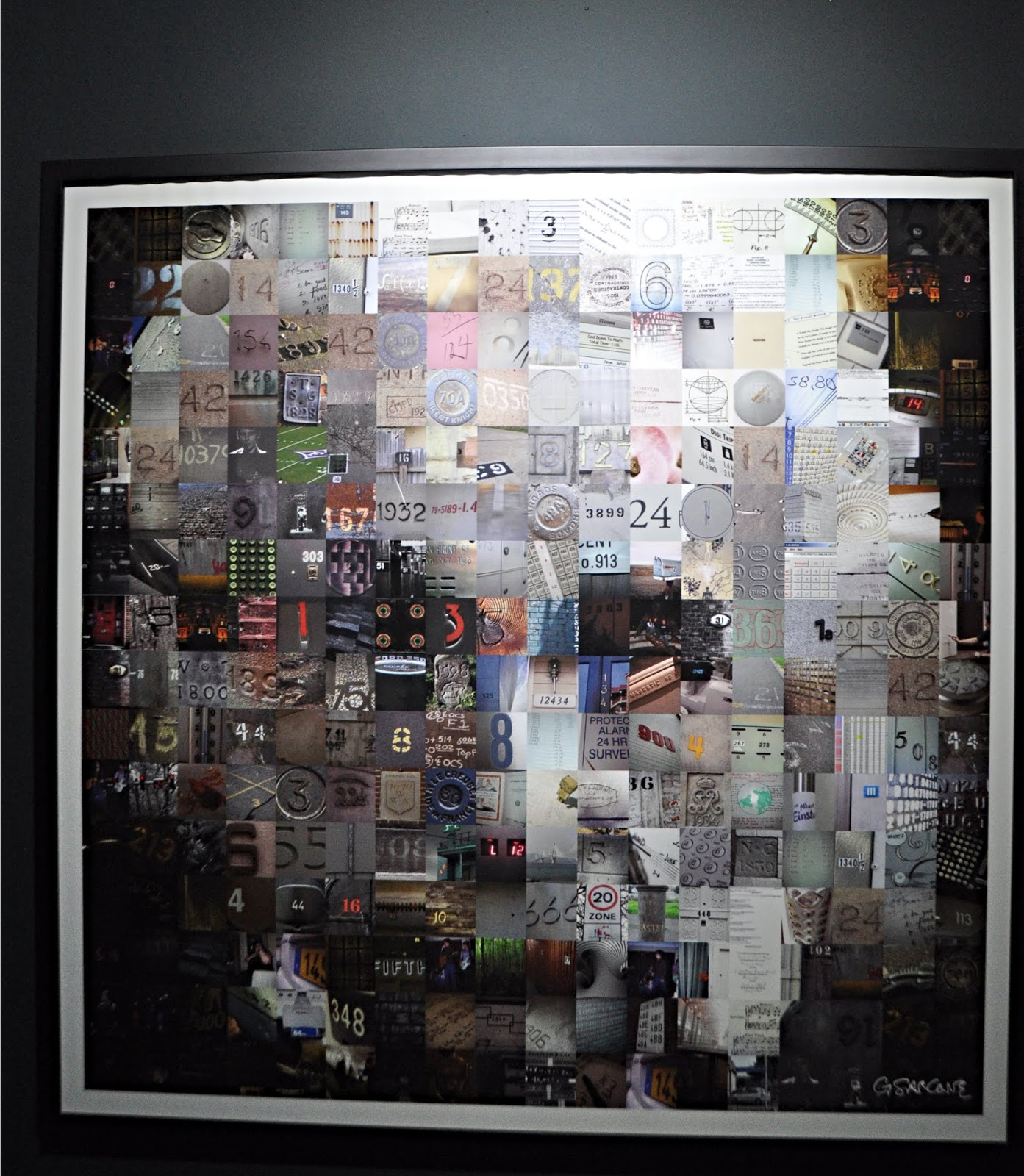
Gianni Sarcone, 2001, Master of Numbers, mixed media / collage, 76 x 76 cm, Museum of Illusions, Kuala Lumpur (Malaysia).

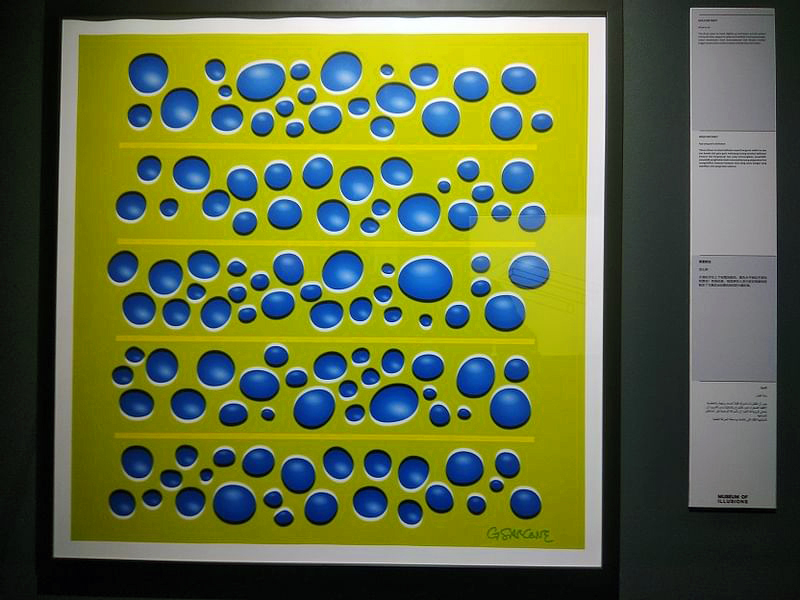
Gianni Sarcone, 2003, Hold on Tight, mixed media, 76 x 76 cm, Museum of Illusions, Kuala Lumpur (Malaysia).

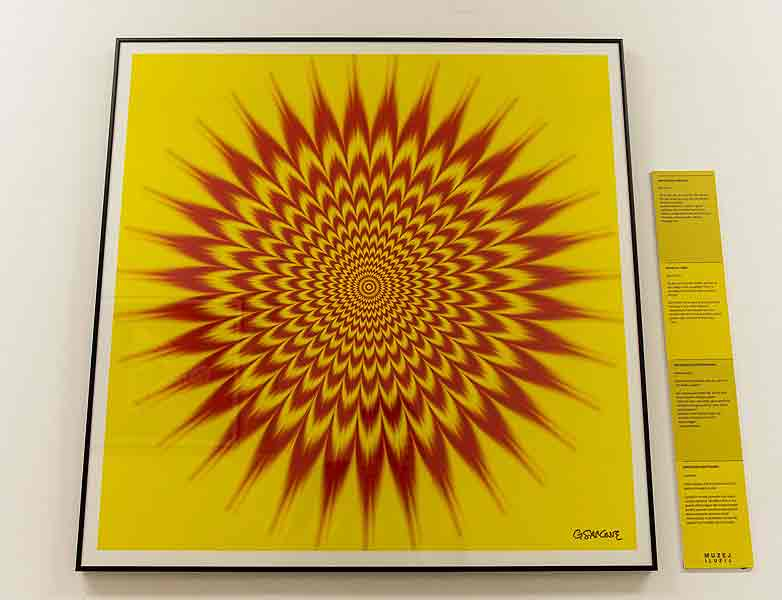
Gianni Sarcone, 1997, Hypnotic Vibes, mixed media, 70 x 70 cm, Museum of Illusions, Ljubljana (Slovenia).

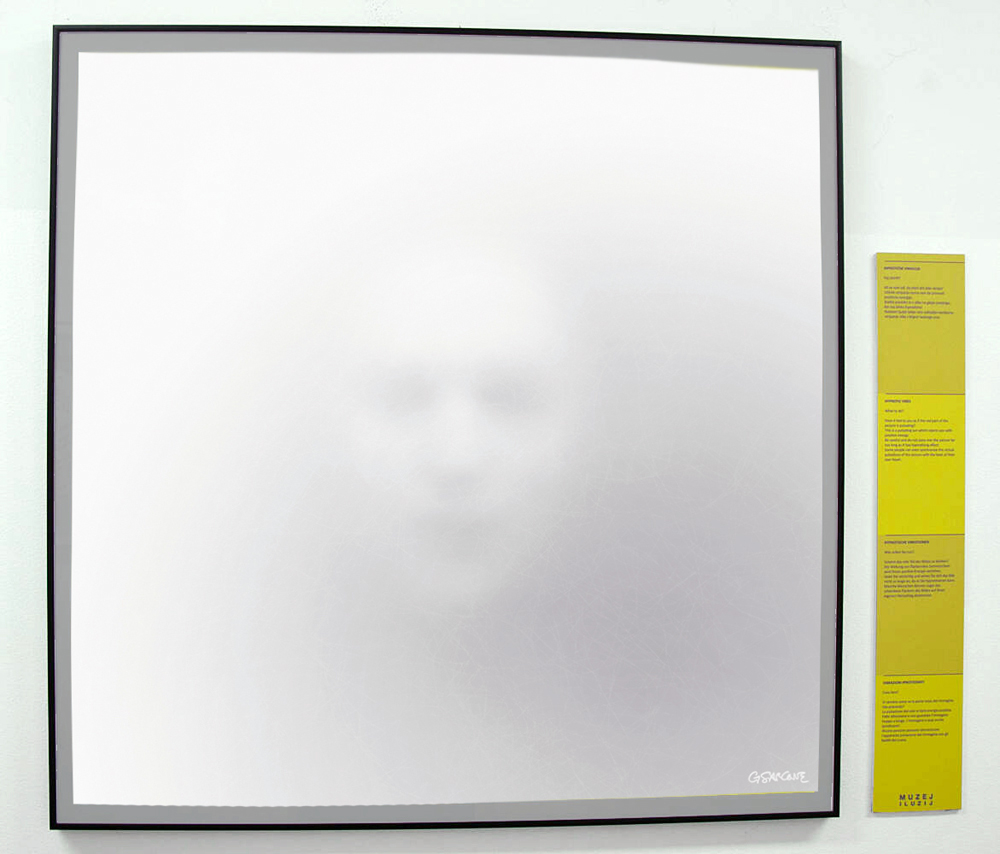
Gianni Sarcone, 2011, Apparition, mixed media, 122 x 122 cm, Museum of Illusions, Ljubljana (Slovenia).

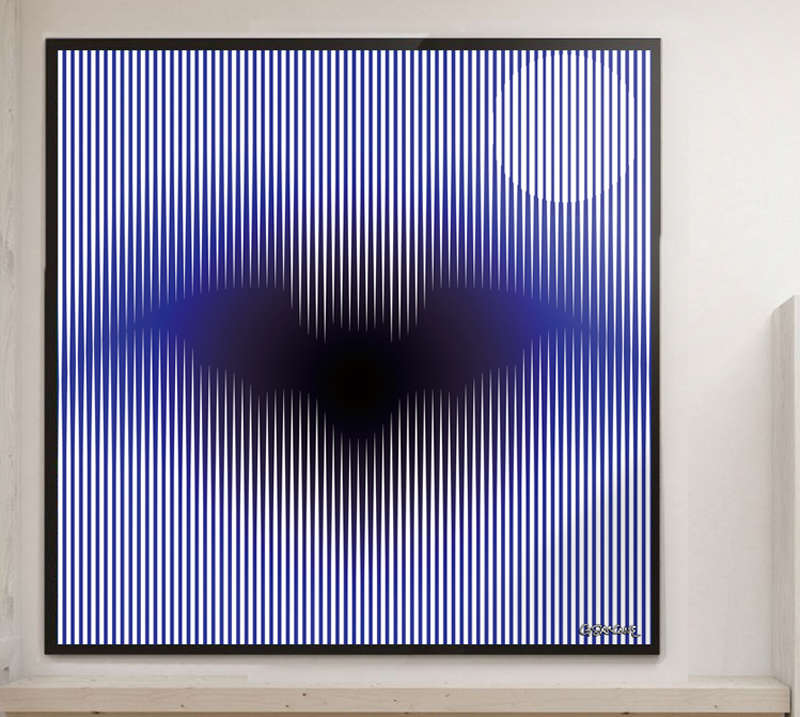
Gianni Sarcone, 2013, Mystic Bat (aka Mystic Flying Bat), mixed media, 122 x 122 cm, Private collection, Florence (Italy).

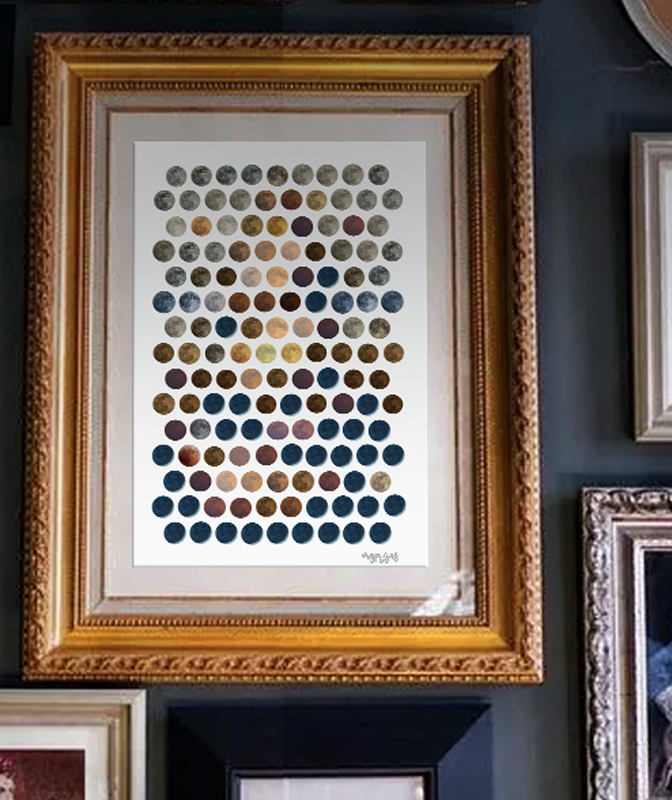
Gianni Sarcone, 1997–2021, Moona Lisa. A mosaic of lunar images that forms the iconic portrait of Leonardo da Vinci's Mona Lisa when viewed from a distance.

== Bibliography ==
=== Recent published works (2014-20) ===
G. Sarcone is the author (and co-author) of the following books:

- Fantastic Optical Illusions: More Than 150 Deceptive Images and Visual Tricks, Carlton, UK, 2020, ISBN 178739235X.
- Ultimate Eye Twisters, Carlton, UK, 2019, ISBN 1783124482.
- Amazing Optical Illusions, Carlton, UK, 2018, ISBN 1787391639.
- Optical Illusions, QED Publishing, UK, 2017, ISBN 1784938475.
- You Can't Possibly Color This!, Moondance Press, US, 2017, ISBN 1633223515.
- How to draw incredible optical illusions, Imagine Publishing, US, 2015, ISBN 1623540607.
- Xtreme Illusions 2, National Geographic Kids, US, 2015, ISBN 978-1-4263-1974-7
- Super Optical Illusions, Carlton Kids, UK, 2014, ISBN 1783120851
- Hidden Picture Puzzles, Imagine Publishing, US, 2014, ISBN 1623540380
- Optical Illusions: An Eye-Popping Extravaganza of Visual Tricks, Dover Publications, US, 2014, ISBN 0486493547
- Impossible Colouring Book: Can You Colour These Amazing Visual Illusions?, Arcturus Publishing, UK, 2014, ISBN 178212182X
- Make Your Own 3D Illusions - 3D illusions pack: All You Need to Build 50 Great Illusions, Carlton Books, UK, 2014, ISBN 1780974817
- Impossible Folding Puzzles and Other Mathematical Paradoxes, Dover Publications, US, 2014, ISBN 0486493512

=== Non-fiction books in other languages ===
- Optische Rätsel, Bassermann Verlag, Germany, 2026, ISBN 3-8094-5197-5
- Verbluffende optische puzzels, Deltas, Belgium, 2025, ISBN 9044769944
- Fascinantes illusions d’optique, Chantecler, Belgium, 2025, ISBN 2803465140
- Оптични илюзии, Publisher Фют, Bulgaria, 2024, ISBN 78-619-270-060-7
- Les millors il·lusions òptiques, Editorial Brúixola, Spain, 2020, ISBN 8499062962
- Las mejores ilusiones ópticas, Editorial Bruño, Spain, 2020, ISBN 846962721X
- Фантастические оптические иллюзии, KoLibri, Russian Federation, 2020, ISBN 978-5-389-17218-0
- Optične iluzije, Tehniška Založba Slovenije D.d., Slovenia, 2019, ISBN 9789612514464
- Ilusões Óticas, Booksmile, Portugal, 2019, ISBN 9789897076589
- Varázslatos optikai csalódások, Ventus Libro Kiadó, Hungary, 2019, ISBN 9786155755439
- Optische illusies, Lantaarn Publishers, Netherlands, 2019, ISBN 9789463543101
- Ilusões de ótica, Quarto (Nobel), Brazil, 2018, ISBN 9780857625533
- Optische Illusionen, Ars Edition, Germany, 2018, ISBN 9783845826592
- Illusions d’optique, Fleurus, France, 2018, ISBN 2215136839
- 錯視の魔術, Kyouikugageki, Japan, 2018, ISBN 4774621277
- Optiska illusioner , Ordalaget, Sweden, 2018, ISBN 9789174692211
- Illusioni ottiche, Armenia, Italy, 2018, ISBN 8834432290
- Vertigo: 50 Schwindelerregende Optische Illusionen, Moses Verlag, Germany, 2016, ISBN 3897779072
- Optische Täuschungen XXL, Ars Edition, Germany, 2016, ISBN 3845816007
- 謎解き錯視 傑作135選 (135 Mysterious Optic Artworks to Solve), Sogen-Sha, Japan, 2015, ISBN 4422700987
- Libro para colorear figuras imposibles, Editorial HISPANO EUROPEA, Spain, 2014, ISBN 8425521106
- 3D Optiset Harhat, Readme.fi, Finland, 2014, ISBN 9789522209115
- Incroyables Illusions d’Optique, Ça m’intéresse, France, 2014, ISBN 2810413274
- 50 Illusions d’Optique 3D, Editions Ça m’intéresse, France, 2014, ISBN 2810412685
- Illusions - Coloriage Créatif, Editions Bravo, Canada, 2014, ISBN 2896701729
- 图中奥秘 : 挑战脑力的错视图 (Amazing Visual Illusions), Qingdao Shi, China, 2013, ISBN 9787543690998
- 图有玄机 : 挑战眼力的错视图 (The World of Visual Illusions), Qingdao Shi, China, 2013, ISBN 9787543690257
- Le Cabinet des Illusions d’Optique : 100 Illusions Stupéfiantes, Editions Fleurus, France, 2013, ISBN 2215147407
- Удивительные оптические иллюзии (Amazing Visual Illusions), Art-Rodnik, Russian Federation, 2013, ISBN 978-5-4449-0048-2
- Рисуем оптические иллюзии (Drawing Optical Illusions), Art-Rodnik, Russian Federation, 2013, ISBN 978-5-4449-0050-5
- Kiehtovat Optiset Harhat, Kustannusosakeyhtiö Nemo, Finland, 2013, ISBN 978-952-240-195-3
- Optische Illusionen, Ars Edition, Germany, 2013, ISBN 3760791301
- Pliages, découpages et magie, Editions Pole, France, 2012, ISBN 2848841656
- De wonderlijke wereld van de optische illusies, Deltas Centrale uitgeverij, The Netherlands, 2012, ISBN 9789044734164
- Unglaubliche Optische Illusionen, Verlag an der Este, Germany, 2012, Artikel-Nr.: 019435
- Spectaculaire Optische Illusies, Uitgeverij Atrium, The Netherlands, 2011, ISBN 9789059473607
- L’étrange univers des illusions d’optique, Editions Fleurus, France, 2011, ISBN 978 2215 11012 5
- Ilusiones Opticas, Circulo de Lectores Barcelona, Spain, 2010, ISBN 8467237414
- Fantasticas ilusiones opticas, Editorial Libsa Sa, Spain, 2010, ISBN 8466221255
- Optische Täuschungen, Bassermann F., Germany, 2009, ISBN 380942398X
- Fantastische Optische Illusionen, Tosa Verlagsgesellschaft, Germany, 2008, ISBN 3850031926
- FantaLogica, Edizioni La Meridiana, Italy, 2009, ISBN 8861530923
- Neue Optische Illusionen, Weltbild, Germany, 2008, ISBN 3828952798
- 阿基米德视幻觉游戏 (Archimedes' Visual Illusion Games), China Friendship Publishing Company, China, 2007, ISBN 9787505723467
- 视幻觉 (Optical illusions), China Friendship Publishing Company, China, 2007, ISBN 9787505723047
- Optische Illusionen, Weltbild, Germany, 2006, ISBN 3828921264
- Niewe Optische Illusies, BZZTOH, The Netherlands, 2006, ISBN 9045304732
- Nouvelles Illusions d’Optique, France Loisirs, France, 2006, ISBN 2744192368
- MateMagica, Edizioni La Meridiana, Italy, 2005, ISBN 8889197560
- L’Almanach du Mathématicien en herbe, Editions Archimède, France, 2002, ISBN 2844690254
- La Couleur dans tous ses états, Editions Yva Peyret, France, 1995, ISBN 2-8308-0029-X

== Personal life ==
Sarcone has practiced and continues to practice various Martial arts and Combat sports, including Yoseikan budō, Kickboxing, Jujutsu), and holds a black belt in Taekwondo.

== Related links ==
- Best Illusion of the Year Contest
- Neuroscience
- Op art
- Optical illusion
- Recreational mathematics
- Thinking outside the box
- Visual thinking
