= Kokichi Sugihara =

Japanese mathematician

Kōkichi Sugihara
- 杉原 厚吉
- Born: June 29, 1948 (age 77); Gifu Prefecture, Japan
- Education: PhD in Mathematical Engineering, University of Tokyo (1980); BSc (1971), MSc (1973)
- Alma mater: University of Tokyo
- Known for: 3D optical illusions (e.g., Impossible Motion, Ambiguous Cylinder)
- Awards: Best Illusion of the Year Contest – 1st place: 2010, 2013, 2018, 2020; 2nd place: 2015, 2016
- Scientific career
- Fields: Mathematics, Optical Illusions, Mathematical Art
- Institutions: Meiji University (Professor, Mathematical Engineering)

Kōkichi Sugihara (Japanese: 杉原厚吉, born June 29, 1948, in Gifu Prefecture) is a Japanese mathematician and artist known for his three-dimensional optical illusions that appear to make marbles roll uphill, pull objects to the highest point of a building's roof, and make circular pipes look rectangular. His illusions, which often involve videos of three-dimensional objects shown from carefully chosen perspectives, won first place at the Best Illusion of the Year Contest in 2010, 2013, 2018,and 2020 and second place in 2015 and 2016.

== Education and career ==
Sugihara earned bachelor's, master's, and doctoral degrees in mathematical engineering from the University of Tokyo in 1971, 1973, and 1980 respectively. From 1973 to 1981 he worked as a researcher at the Ministry of International Trade and Industry. He then became an associate professor in the Department of Information and Computer Engineering at Nagoya University in 1981, and moved back to the Department of Mathematical Engineering and Information Physics at the University of Tokyo in 1986. Since 2009 he has been a professor at Meiji University.

== Illusions ==
Five of Sugihara's illusions have won awards at the annual Best Illusion of the Year Contest:

- In 2010, his illusion "Impossible Motion: Magnet Slopes" won first place in the contest. This illusion uses forced perspective to show marbles seemingly rolling up ramps.
- In 2013 he won first place again (with Jun Ono and Akiyasu Tomoeda) for "Rotation Generated by Translation", an illusion that uses Moiré patterns to create the appearance of rotation from objects moving only by translation.
- In 2015 his "Ambiguous Garage Roof" won second place. The illusion appears to show a convex roof surface that is reflected in a mirror to a corrugated zig-zag shape. Neither of these appearances accurately describes the true shape of the roof.
- In 2016 he won second place again for "Ambiguous Cylinder Illusion", which shows a stack of cylinders that from one point of view appear to have a circular cross-section, and from another point of view appear rectangular.
- In 2018 he won his first place for his "Triply Ambiguous Object", which shows a rectangular object with three different interpretations when seen from three special viewpoints.
- In 2020 he won his first place for his "3D Schroeder Staircase".

His interest in illusions stems from his research in the 1980s on automating the analysis of perspective drawings, which he published in the 1986 MIT Press book Machine Interpretation of Line Drawings. When he asked his computer system to interpret impossible objects such as the ones in the art of M. C. Escher, he discovered that they could be interpreted as drawings of real objects with unexpected shapes.

== Other research ==
Sugihara's research also includes the study of Voronoi diagrams. With three co-authors: Atsuyuki Okabe, Barry Boots, and Sung Nok Chiu, he wrote Spatial Tessellations: Concepts and Applications of Voronoi Diagrams (Wiley, 1994; 2nd ed., 2009).
