= Zarcone =

Zarcone is an Italian surname. Notable people with the surname include:

- Luigi Zarcone (1950–2001), Italian middle and long-distance runner
- Marley Zarcone (born 1983), Canadian comics artist

== See also ==
- Sarcone
