= Archimedes-lab.org =

Archimedes Laboratory Project
- Website type: Educational
- Creators: Marie-Jo Waeber, Gianni A. Sarcone
- Website: http://www.archimedes-lab.org
- Commercial: No
- Launched: 1995

Archimedes-lab.org is a free and collaborative edutainment project developed by Gianni A. Sarcone and Marie-Jo Waeber, two authors and writers with more than thirty years of experience in the fields of visual thinking and education. This educational project is part of the Open Education Consortium and it is supervised by a consulting network of experts specializing in online education.

The main goal of the web site is to teach mathematics differently and to make it accessible to everyone through visual puzzles and games. The site walks visitors through various problem solving strategies and discoveries in the world of recreational mathematics.

Limited parts of the site are offered in French, Italian, Spanish and German. But regular puzzle features like the Puzzle of the Week, the Sunday Puzzle and the Puzzle of the Month are available in three languages: English, French and Italian.

== Site contents ==
Archimedes-lab.org is divided into four main categories: puzzles & tests, illusions & paradoxes, mind & brain, oddities & curiosities. Among the proposed educational tools and tutorials, visitors will find intuitive visuals, number games, puzzles with downloadable pieces, perception puzzles and interactive optical illusions. A principal objective throughout the site is the enhancement of critical thinking skills and the development of creativity. Here's a quote from Scientific American (May 27, 2003): "This virtual lab borrows the empirical spirit and creative curiosity that Archimedes brought to his work and invites visitors to explore with the same expectations for mind-blowing discovery."

== Awards and accolades ==
Archimedes-lab.org has won several awards from scientific and educational publications, including a Scientific American Web Award in 2003, the National Council of Teachers of Mathematics Web Award, and a mention in MERLOT, the Multimedia Educational Resource for Learning and Online Teaching and in The DO-IT Center, the Disabilities, Opportunities, Internetworking, and Technology Center.

== Selected works ==
=== Books from Archimedes' Laboratory ===
- How to draw incredible optical illusions, Imagine Publishing, USA, 2015, ISBN 1623540607.
- Super Optical Illusions, Carlton Kids, UK, 2014, ISBN 1783120851
- Impossible Folding Puzzles and Other Mathematical Paradoxes, Dover Publications, USA, 2014, ISBN 0486493512
- Pliages, découpages et magie, Editions Pole, France, 2012, ISBN 2848841656
- Puzzillusions, Carlton Books Ltd, London, 2007, ISBN 1-84442-064-7
- Big Book of Optical Illusions, Barron's Educational Series, New York, 2006, ISBN 0-7641-3520-1
- MateMagica, La Meridiana, Italy, 2005, ISBN 88-89197-56-0
- L'Almanach du mathematicien en herbe, Editions Archimede, Paris, 2002, ISBN 2-84469-025-4
