= Miss United States 2022 =

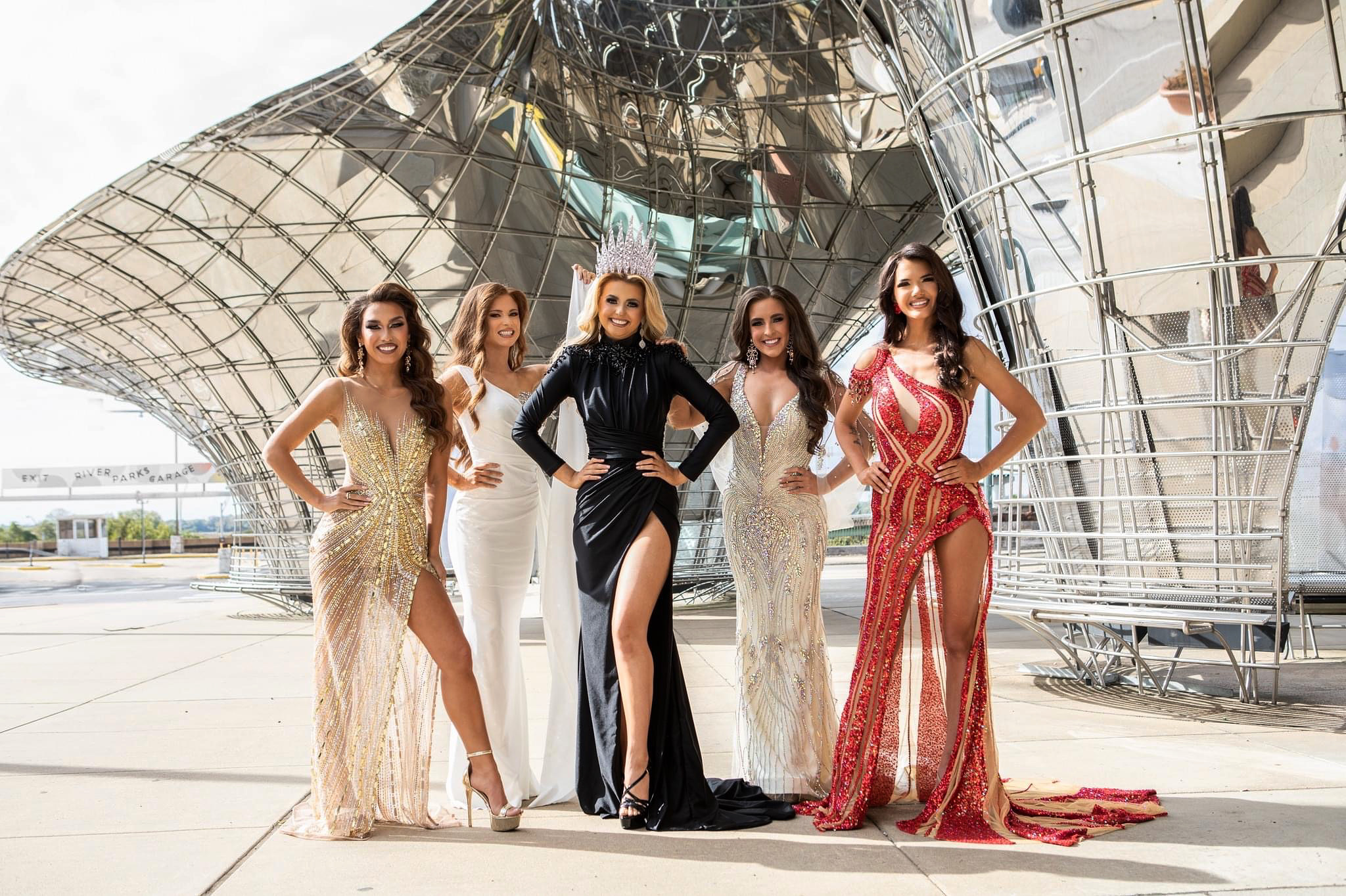
- Miss United States 2022 Top 5
- Date: October 17, 2022
- Presenters: Kim Payne
- Venue: Cannon Center for the Performing Arts, Memphis, Tennessee
- Placements: 5
- Winner: Lily K. Donaldson; New York

Miss United States 2022 was the 36th edition of the Miss United States pageant, which occurred at the Cannon Center for the Performing Arts in Memphis, Tennessee on October 17, 2022. Miss United States 2021, Samantha Keene Anderson of Arizona, crowned Lily K. Donaldson representing New York at the end of the event.

Miss United States is a pageant held in the United States for unmarried women between the ages of 20–29. The pageant includes women selected to represent all 50 states, District of Columbia, American Samoa, Guam, Commonwealth of the Northern Mariana Islands, Puerto Rico, and the U.S. Virgin Islands, who compete in Swimsuit, Evening Gown, Private Interview, and an onstage speaking portion dedicated to each contestant's chosen charitable cause.

The 2022 competition was sponsored by Johnathan Kayne, Dibiase Hair Extensions, and the Sash Company.

== Results ==
=== Placements ===
Placement	Contestant
Miss United States 2022	New York – Lily K. Donaldson
1st Runner-Up	Alabama – Graci Pennington
2nd Runner-Up	California – Amanda Ford
3rd Runner-Up	Mississippi – Addison Grace Hadley
4th Runner-Up	Montana – Alora Martin

=== Special awards ===
Award	Contestant
Interview Award	Alabama – Graci Pennington
Swimsuit Award	New York – Lily K. Donaldson
