= Atsuyuki Okabe =

Japanese geospatial information scientist

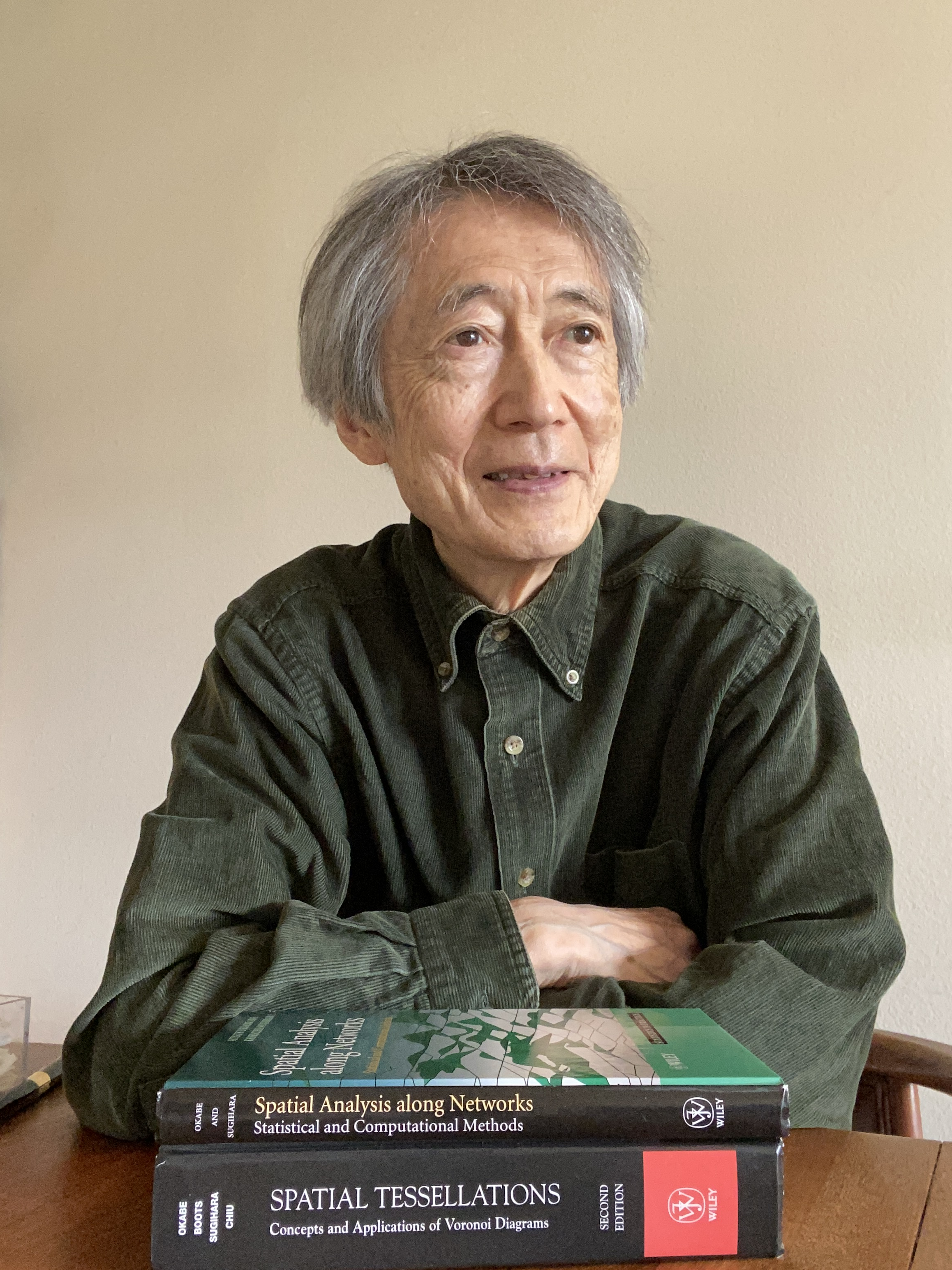
- Born: 16 August 1945; Arita, Saga, Japan
- Education: University of Pennsylvania; University of Tokyo
- Scientific career
- Thesis: Contributions to the Study of Stochastic Spatial Interaction Models (UPenn, 1975), Contributions to the Study of City Size Distributions (UTokyo, 1977)
- Doctoral advisor: Tony Smith; Kaoru Shimofusa

Atsuyuki Okabe (born August 16, 1945) is a Japanese geospatial information scientist who has contributed to statistical and computational spatial analysis. He received his Ph.D. from the University of Pennsylvania in 1975 and his Doctor of Engineering from the University of Tokyo in 1977.

== Education ==
Okabe obtained his Bachelor of Engineering and Master of Engineering in urban engineering from the University of Tokyo in 1969 and 1971, respectively. In 1972, he pursued further studies under William Alonso at the University of California, Berkeley for one term before transferring to the University of Pennsylvania. He obtained his Ph.D. in regional science from the University of Pennsylvania in 1975. His dissertation, under the supervision of Tony Smith, developed stochastic spatial interaction models. Subsequently, he obtained his Doctor of Engineering in urban engineering from the University of Tokyo in 1977. His dissertation, under the supervision of Kaoru Shimofusa, analyzed the rank-size rule and Pareto distribution of city sizes in terms of order statistics.

== Career ==
=== University positions ===
He began his research and teaching career at the College of Policy and Planning Science in Tsukuba University in 1977 as a lecturer and subsequently as an associate professor in 1979. Then he moved to the Department of Urban Engineering in the University of Tokyo in 1980 as an associate professor and was a visiting scholar at the University of Pennsylvania in 1988-89. Subsequently he became a professor in 1990. Concurrently, from 1998 to 2005, he served as the first Director of the Center for Spatial Information Science at the University of Tokyo. He retired from the University of Tokyo in 2009 and became an emeritus professor of the University of Tokyo. He subsequently moved to the School of Cultural and Creative Studies at Aoyama Gakuin University as a professor in 2009, and then the School of the Global Studies and Collaboration at Aoyama Gakuin University as a professor in 2016. He retired from Aoyama Gakuin University in 2019 and became an emeritus professor of Aoyama Gakuin University.

=== Professional affiliations ===
He was a member of the Science Council of Japan from 2005 to 2011.

He has been the Chairman of the Japanese Committee of the ISO/TC211 (International Organization for Standardization/Geographic Information/Geomatics) since 2010.

=== Research ===
Okabe has published over 100 academic papers including book chapters. In a special issue volume dedicated to Okabe in the Journal of Geographical Systems (2009), he reflected on his research career. In addition, in a book dedicated to Okabe and published by CRC Press, entitled New Frontiers in Urban Analysis, he discussed future directions of spatial analysis. Okabe has contributed to three fields of study: spatial tessellations, in particular Voronoi diagrams; the extension of spatial analysis on a plane to that on a network; and GIS applications to the humanities and social sciences, in particular Islamic area studies.

==== Voronoi diagrams ====
Okabe published a book of Voronoi diagrams with Barry Boots, Kokichi Sugihara and Sung Nok Chiu, entitled Spatial Tessellations: Concepts and Applications of Voronoi Diagrams with a foreword by David George Kendall, as a volume in the Wiley series of Probabilities and Mathematical Statistics (the first edition 1992, the second edition 2000). The book was initially reviewed by Marijorie Senechal in Science in 1993, followed by more than ten subsequent reviews in various academic journals. Their Voronoi book has been cited by more than 8000 papers by 2025.

==== Spatial analysis along networks ====
He published a book with Kokichi Sugihara entitled Spatial Analysis along Networks: Statistical and Computational Methods, as a volume of Wiley's Statistics in Practice series in 2012.

==== GIS applications in the humanities and social sciences ====
Okabe and his collaborators applied GIS to Islamic Area Studies, and their findings were disseminated in the book, Islamic Area Studies with Geographical Information Systems, published by RoutledgeCurzon in 2004. This book was awarded the World Prize for the Book of the Year of the Islamic Republic of Iran in 2006.

== Awards and honors ==
- World Prize for the Book of the Year of the Islamic Republic of Iran, Islamic studies, 2006
- Laureat d’honneur awards, International Geographical Union, 2018
- Special Award, Association of Japanese Geographers, 2006
- Book Award, Geographical Information Systems Association, Japan, 2006
- Fellow of Japan Geoscience Union, 2014

== Publications ==
=== Books ===
- Okabe, Atsuyuki; Boots, Barry; Sugihara, Kokichi; Chiu, Sung Nok (2000). Spatial Tessellations: Concepts and Applications of Voronoi Diagrams (2nd ed.). Wiley. ISBN 9780471986355.
- Boots, Barry; Okabe, Atsuyuki; Thomas, Richard (2002). Modelling Geographical Systems: Statistical and Computational Applications. Springer Dordrecht. ISBN 9781402008214.
- Okabe, Atsuyuki, ed. (2004). Islamic Area Studies with Geographical Information Systems. Routledge Curzon. ISBN 9780415332507.
- Okabe, Atsuyuki, ed. (2006). GIS-based Studies in the Humanities and Social Sciences. CRC Press. ISBN 9780849327131.
- Okabe, Atsuyuki; Sugihara, Kokichi (2012). Spatial Analysis along Networks: Statistical and Computational Methods. Wiley. ISBN 9780470770818.

=== Selected publications ===
- Okabe, A., Aoki, K. and Hamamoto, W. (1986). Distance and direction judgment in a large-scale natural environment: Effects of a slope and winding trail. Environment and Behavior, 18(6), 755–772.
- Okabe, A. and Suzuki, A. (1987). Stability of spatial competition for a large number of firms on a bounded two-dimensional space. Environment and Planning A, 19(8), 1067-1082.
- Okabe, A., Boots, B. and Sugihara, K. (1994). Nearest neighbourhood operations with generalized Voronoi diagrams: a review. International Journal of Geographical Information Science, 8, 43-71.
- Okabe, A., Yomono, H. and Kitamua, M. (1995). Statistical analysis of the distribution of points on a network. Geographical Analysis, 27(2), 152-175.
- Okabe, A. and Suzuki, A. (1997). Locational optimization problems solved through Voronoi diagrams. European Journal of Operational Research, 23(1), 7-23.
- Okabe, A. and Yamada, I. (2001). The K‐function method on a network and its computational implementation. Geographical Analysis, 5(2), 109-110.
- Okabe, A. and Okunuki, K. (2001). A computational method for estimating the demand of retail stores on a street network and its implementation in GIS. Transactions in GIS, 5(3), 209-220.
- Okabe, A., Okunuki, K. and Shiode, S. (2006). SANET: a toolbox for spatial analysis on a network. Geographical analysis. 38(1), 57-66.
- Okabe, A., Satoh, T. and Sugihara, K. (2009). A kernel density estimation method for networks, its computational method and a GIS‐based tool. International Journal of Geographical Information Science, 98(3), 445-456.
- Okabe, A., Satoh, T. Furuta, T. and Suzuki, A. (2009). Generalized network Voronoi diagrams: Concepts, computational methods, and applications. International Journal of Geographical Information Science. 22(9), 965-994.

== Family ==
Atsuyuki Okabe is the eldest son of Shuichi Okabe and Mitsu Okabe (née Hisatomi). The second son, Hitoshi Okabe, was a professor of German literature at Tokyo Metropolitan University. The youngest son, Yuzo Okabe, was a professor of comparative literature and culture at the University of Tokyo. In 1973, Atsuyuki married Kayo Okabe (née Tamanoi), a lecturer at Hosei University. She taught GIS-based studies of urban open space, regional cultural activities, and the spatial behavior of wild chickens. The couple has a daughter, Aya Takenaka (née Okabe), who earned a Master of Advanced Studies in Architecture from the University of British Columbia. She co-founded a company that specializes in intelligent robotics with her husband, Tsukasa Takenaka.
