= Rabbit–duck illusion =

Optical illusion

"Kaninchen und Ente" ("Rabbit and Duck") from the 23 October 1892 issue of Fliegende Blätter

The rabbit–duck illusion is an ambiguous image in which a rabbit or a duck can be seen.

The earliest known version is an unattributed drawing from the 23 October 1892 issue of Fliegende Blätter, a German humour magazine. It was captioned, in older German spelling, "Welche Thiere gleichen einander am meisten?" ("Which animals are most like each other?"), with "Kaninchen und Ente" ("Rabbit and Duck") written underneath.

After being used by psychologist Joseph Jastrow, the image was made famous by Ludwig Wittgenstein, who included it in his Philosophical Investigations as a means of describing two different ways of seeing: "seeing that" versus "seeing as".

== Correlations ==
Whether one sees a rabbit or a duck, and how often, may correlate with sociological, biological, and psychological factors. For example, Swiss, both young and old, tend to see a bunny during Easter and a bird/duck in October. It may also indicate creativity. A standard test of creativity is to list as many novel uses as one can for an everyday object (e.g., a paper clip) in a limited time. Wiseman et al. found that participants who easily could see the image as either a rabbit or duck came up with an average of about 5 novel uses for their everyday item, while those who could not flip between rabbit and duck at all came up with fewer than 2 novel uses.

== Philosophical implications ==
Several scholars suggested that the illusion resonates philosophically and politically. Wittgenstein, as Shirley Le Penne commented, employed the rabbit–duck illusion to distinguish perception from interpretation. Seen only as a duck, one might think that it was a duck, but once one becomes aware of the duality one might say "now I see it as a rabbit". One may also say "it's a rabbit–duck", which, for Wittgenstein, is a perceptual report.

According to Jonny Thomson, Wittgenstein's famous duck-rabbit illusion explains the concept of 'aspect perception'. Even for the same object, depending on the observer's conceptual and experiential framework, 'seen-as' changes as a duck or a rabbit, and we always immediately recognize the object 'seeing as' rather than as itself. Wittgenstein points out that the moment of realizing this perceptual shift is rare, and some people may be 'aspect blind' and not be able to see the other aspect at all. Ultimately, this reminds us of how fluid the way we understand the world is at times.

Norwood Russell Hanson has extended Wittgenstein's discussion into a philosophy of science discussion of theory-ladenness. Thomas Kuhn, like Hanson, also used the rabbit–duck illusion as a metaphor for revolutionary change in science, illustrating the way in which a paradigm shift could cause one to see the same information in an entirely different way.

== See also ==
- Three hares
