= Leaning tower illusion =

Visual illusion seen in a pair of identical images of the Leaning Tower of Pisa

The leaning tower illusion is a visual illusion seen in a pair of identical images of the Leaning Tower of Pisa photographed from below. Although the images are duplicates, one has the impression that the tower on the right leans more, as if photographed from a different angle. The illusion was discovered by Frederick Kingdom, Ali Yoonessi and Elena Gheorghiu at McGill University, and won first prize in the Best Illusion of the Year Contest 2007.

== Description ==
The authors suggest that the illusion occurs because of the way the visual system takes into account perspective. When two identical towers rise in parallel but are viewed from below, their corresponding outlines converge in the retinal image due to perspective. The visual system normally "corrects" for the perspective distortion and as a result perceives the towers correctly, i.e. as rising in parallel. However in the case of the two identical images of the Pisa tower, the corresponding outlines of the towers do not converge but run in parallel, and as a result the towers are perceived as non-parallel, i.e. as diverging. The illusion reveals that the visual system is obliged to treat the two images as part of the same scene, in other words as the "Twin Towers of Pisa".

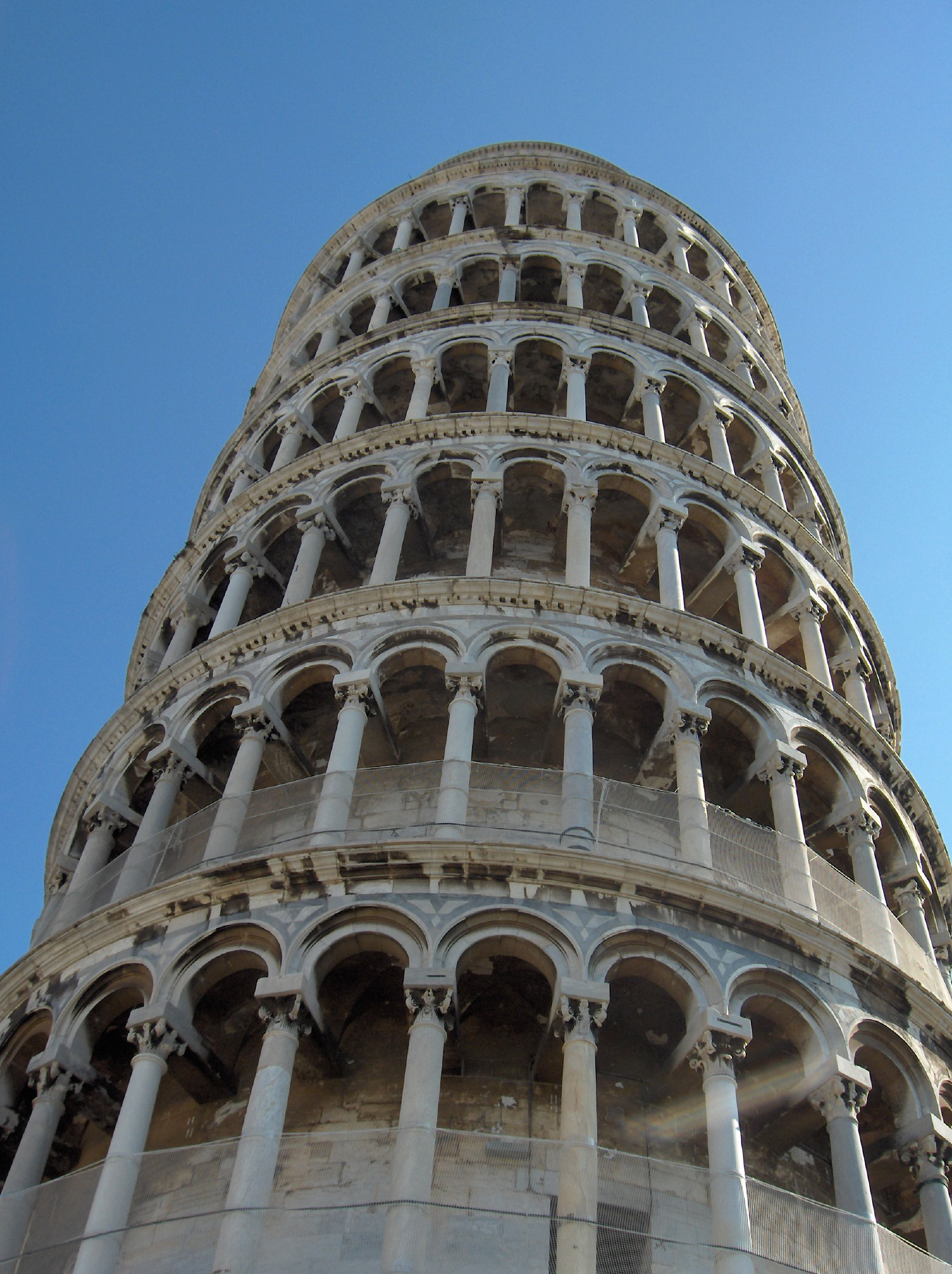

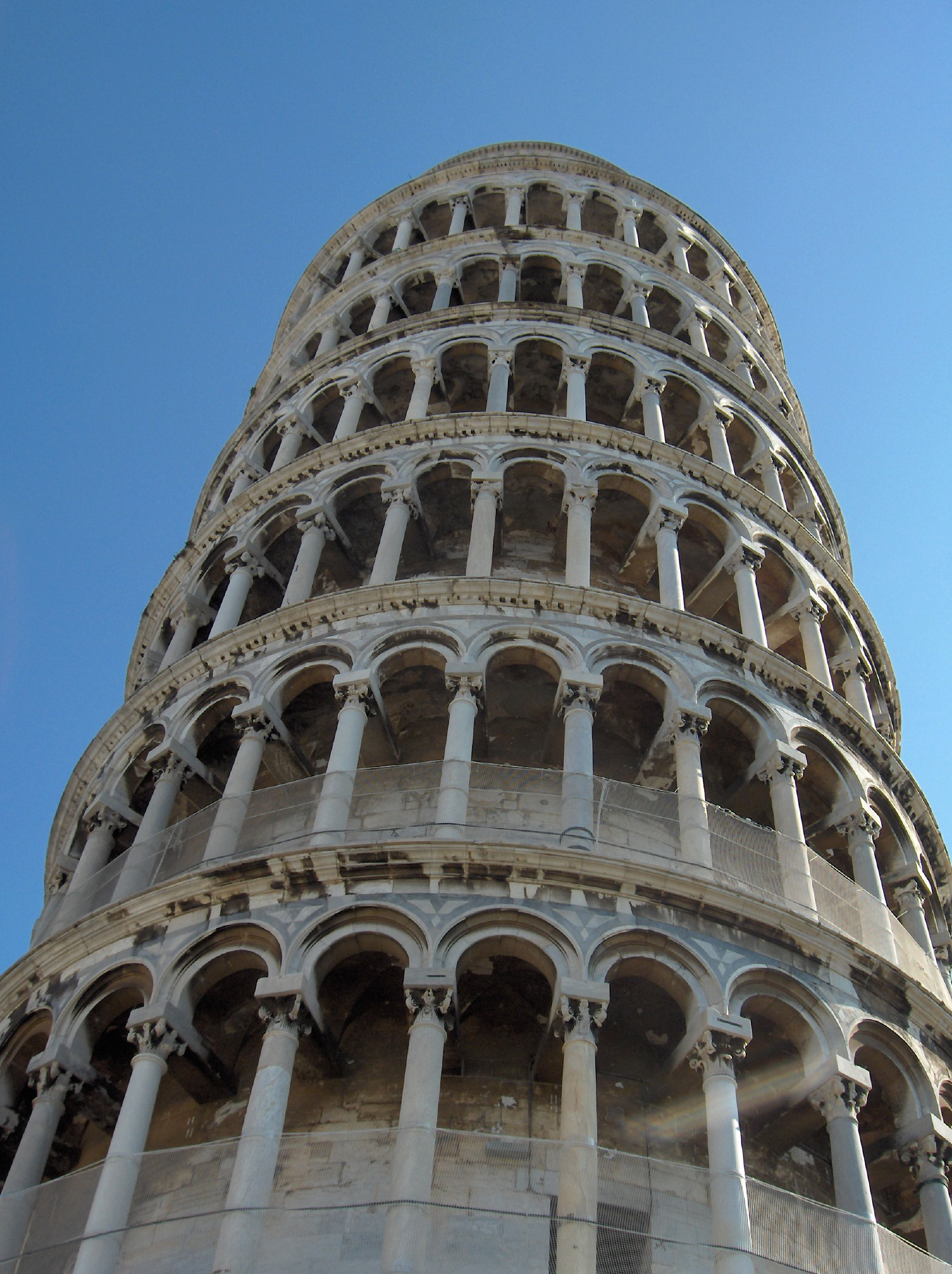

== Further examples ==
Although the Pisa tower demonstrates the illusion and provides a pun for its name, the illusion can be seen in any pair of (identical) images of a receding object.

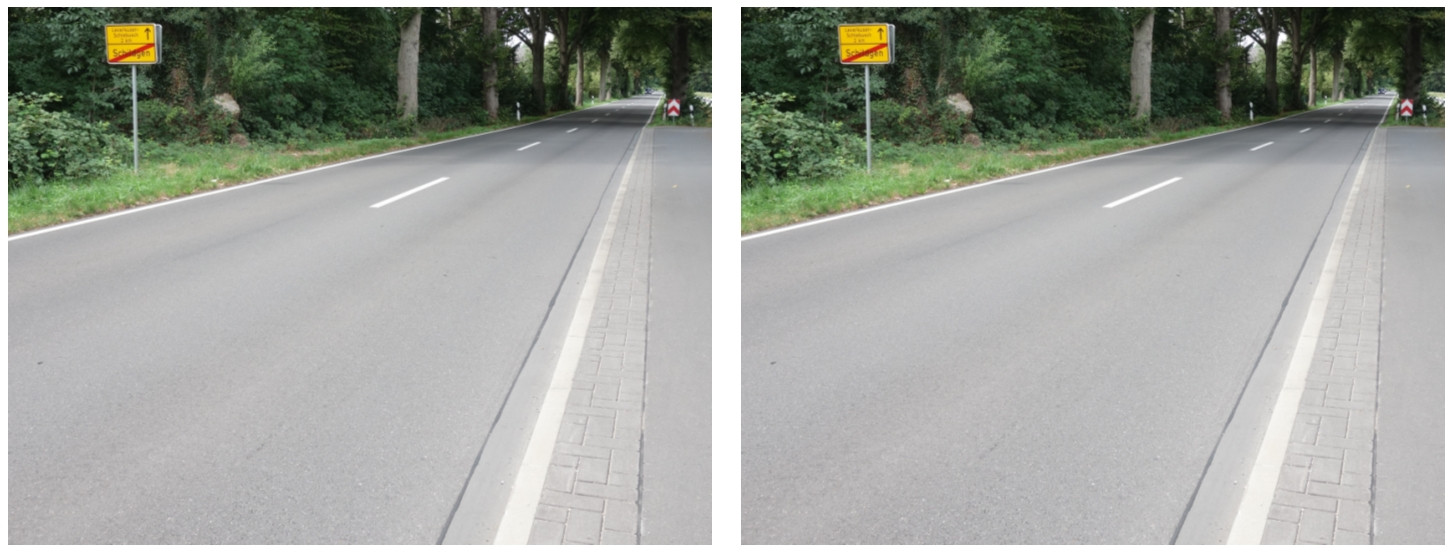
Both photos are exactly identical, although the streets appear to intersect.

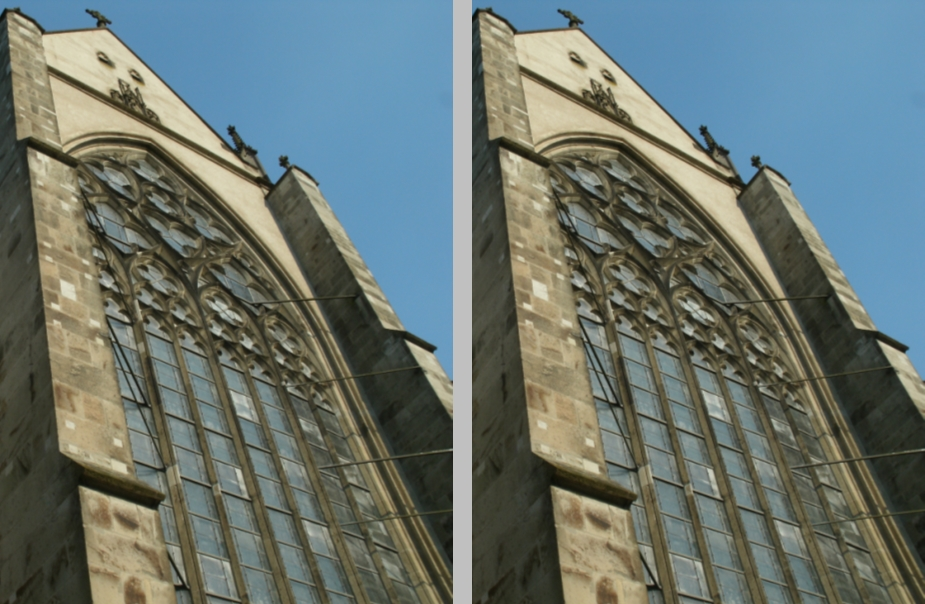
West window of Altenberg Cathedral: Both images are identical, although the part of the facade shown on the left appears more slanted than the one on the right.
