= Julie Jastrow =

American ecologist

Julie Dierstein Jastrow
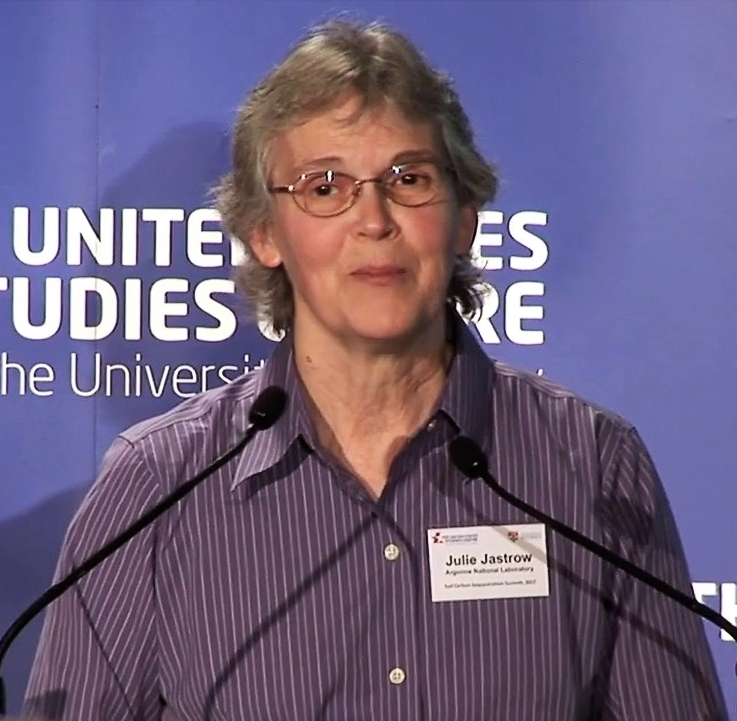
- Jastrow speaks in 2011
- Education: University of Illinois at Urbana-Champaign; University of Illinois Chicago
- Scientific career
- Workplaces: Argonne National Laboratory
- Thesis: Mechanisms of aggregate formation and stabilization in prairie soils (1994)

Julie Dierstein Jastrow is an American terrestrial ecologist who works at the Argonne National Laboratory. Her research considers soil and ecosystems ecology. She was elected Fellow of the American Association for the Advancement of Science in 2021.

== Early life and education ==
Jastrow was an undergraduate student at the University of Illinois at Urbana-Champaign. She was a doctoral researcher at the University of Illinois Chicago, where she studied aggregate formation and stabilization in prairie soils.

== Research and career ==
In 1994, Jastrow joined the Argonne National Laboratory. She was made an Assistant Scientist in 1979 and Senior Scientist in 2010. Her research makes use of multi-scale mechanistic studies to understand the dynamics of organic soil. She has contributed to our understanding of soil biogeochemical responses to changes in vegetation and land management. Eventually, Jastrow was appointed Lead of the Ecosystem Biogeochemistry Group in the Environmental Science Division. She has served on the steering committee of the National Academies of Sciences, Engineering, and Medicine Frontiers in Soil Science research.

Jastrow started researching permafrost soil carbon in 2012. At the time, permafrost was gaining increasing interest due to concerns about climate change. Permafrost stores thousands of billions of tonnes of carbon, which is around a third of global terrestrial carbon. Jastrow has studied how global warming impacts the amount of stored carbon. She showed that the amount of carbon stored in permafrost exhibits a considerable spatial variability, and that cryoturbation contributes to the distribution of carbon within the soil. She combines soil measurements with high resolution digital evolution models to predict and map how carbon is distributed around soil. She has studied ice-wedge polygons: area where surface soils freeze and thaw, contracting into a net of giant cracks, which, in the summer months, turn water into giant ice wedges in the permafrost underneath. These polygons present some of the most under-studied soil features and can be easily studied on satellites or using remote sensing.

Jastrow has studied the microbial residues within soil organic matter, and shown that they can contribute to long-term storage of carbon.

== Awards and honours ==
Jastrow served as President of the Soil Ecology Society in 2004.

In 2014, Jastrow was awarded the University of Chicago – Argonne Board of Governors Distinguished Performance Award. She was named one of the United States Department of Energy Argonne Distinguished Fellow in 2020. In 2021, Jastrow was made a Fellow of the American Association for the Advancement of Science.

== Selected publications ==
- Luke R Thompson; Jon G Sanders; Daniel McDonald; et al. (November 1, 2017). "A communal catalogue reveals Earth's multiscale microbial diversity". Nature. 551 (7681): 457–463. doi:10.1038/nature24621. ISSN 1476-4687. PMC 6192678. PMID 29088705. Wikidata Q46349678.
- Uta Stockmann; Mark A. Adams; John W. Crawford; et al. (January 2013). "The knowns, known unknowns and unknowns of sequestration of soil organic carbon". Agriculture. 164: 80–99. doi:10.1016/j.agee.2012.10.001. ISSN 0167-8809. Wikidata Q58382613.
- Julie D. Jastrow; James E. Amonette; Vanessa L. Bailey (December 21, 2006). "Mechanisms controlling soil carbon turnover and their potential application for enhancing carbon sequestration". Climatic Change. 80 (1–2): 5–23. doi:10.1007/s10584-006-9178-3. ISSN 0165-0009. Wikidata Q61655284.
