= Joseph Jastrow =

American psychologist

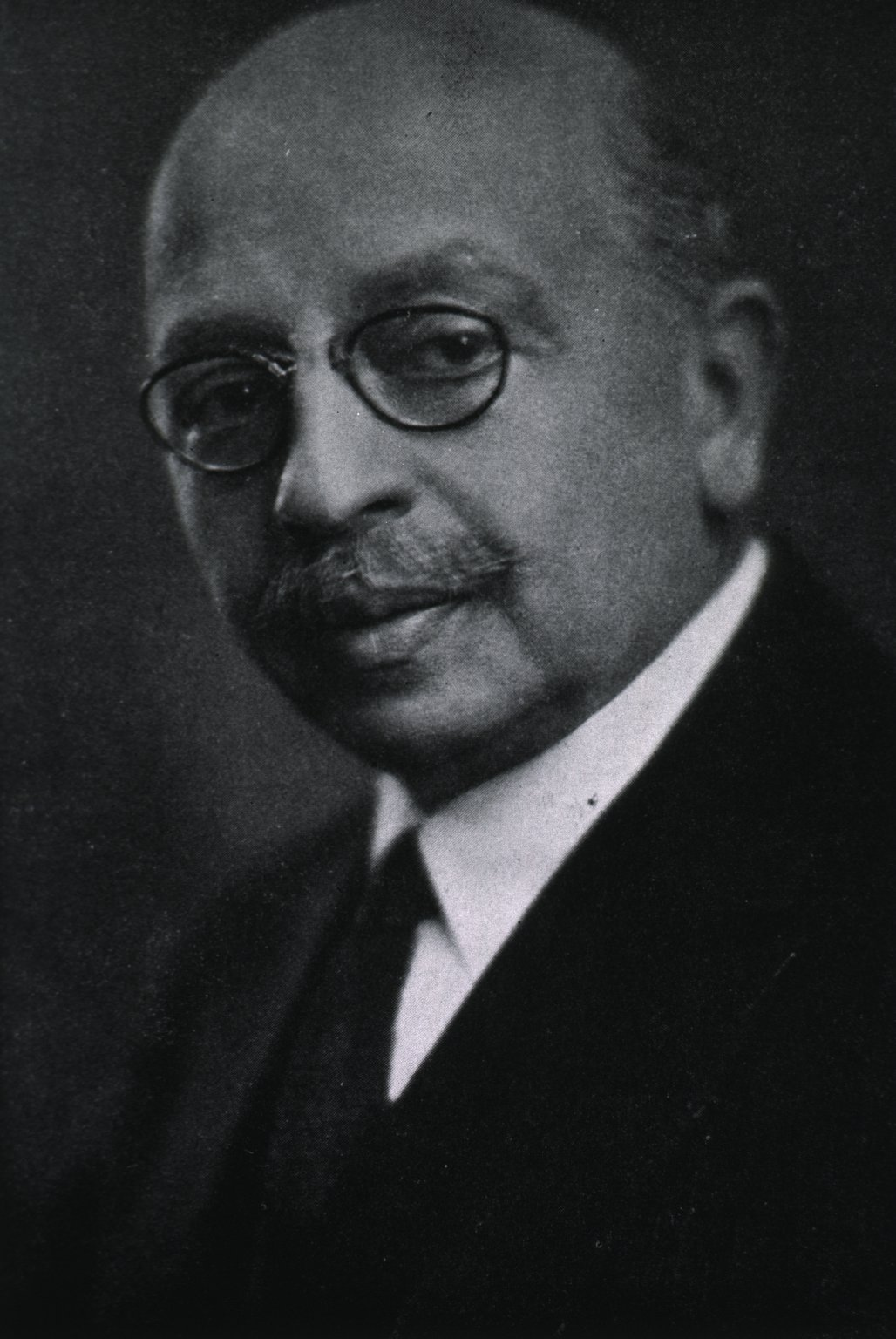
- Joseph Jastrow
- Born: January 30, 1863; Warsaw, Congress Poland
- Died: January 8, 1944 (aged 80); Stockbridge, Massachusetts, US
- Education: University of Pennsylvania; Johns Hopkins University
- Father: Marcus Jastrow
- Scientific career
- Fields: Psychology
- Workplaces: University of Wisconsin–Madison
- Thesis: The Perception of Space by Disparate Senses (1886)
- Doctoral advisor: Charles Sanders Peirce
- Doctoral students: Clark L. Hull

Joseph Jastrow (January 30, 1863 – January 8, 1944) was an American psychologist who contributed to experimental psychology, design of experiments, and psychophysics. He also worked on the phenomena of optical illusions, and a number of optical illusions (notably the Jastrow illusion) that were either first reported in or popularized by his work. Jastrow believed that everyone had their own, often incorrect, preconceptions about psychology. One of his ultimate goals was to use the scientific method to identify truth from error, and educate the general public, which Jastrow accomplished through speaking tours, popular print media, and the radio.

== Biography ==
Jastrow was born in Warsaw, Poland. A son of Talmud scholar Marcus Jastrow, Joseph Jastrow was the younger brother of the orientalist, Morris Jastrow, Jr. Joseph Jastrow came to Philadelphia in 1866 and received his bachelor's and master's degrees from the University of Pennsylvania. During his doctoral studies at Johns Hopkins University, Jastrow worked with C. S. Peirce on experiments in psychophysics that introduced randomization and blinding for a repeated measures design. (Note: The Peirce-Jastrow experiment is increasingly recognized as the first properly randomized experiment, which led to psychology (and education) having laboratories for and textbooks on randomized experiments (decades before Ronald A. Fisher).) Though Peirce had to leave the university due to a personal scandal, Jastrow continued to advance his own research despite Peirce’s departure. From 1888 until his retirement in 1927, Jastrow was a professor at the University of Wisconsin–Madison, where he advised Clark L. Hull. He was a lecturer at the New School of Social Research from 1927 to 1933.

Jastrow was head of the psychological section of the World's Columbian Exposition in 1893, where he collected "psychophysical and reaction time data" from thousands of attendees. He was one of the charter members of the American Psychological Association, and eventually became the president in 1900.

Jastrow was noted for his outreach in popular media, making psychological research accessible to a wider audience. He gave public lectures, and was published in popular magazines, including Popular Science, Cosmopolitan, and Harper's Monthly. He also wrote Keeping Mentally Fit, a syndicated column that appeared in 150 newspapers. Jastrow also gave radio talks from 1935 to 1938 through the Philadelphia Public Ledger Syndicate.

Jastrow also suffered from bouts of depression throughout his life. He died in Stockbridge, Massachusetts. His wife was Rachel Szold, a sister of Henrietta Szold. Elisabeth Jastrow, the classical archaeologist, was a cousin.

His former home was in Madison, Wisconsin, which is now located in the Langdon Street Historic District.

== Psychical research ==
Jastrow was one of the founding members of the American Society for Psychical Research for study of the "mesmeric, psychical, and spiritual". The early members of the society were skeptical of paranormal phenomena; Jastrow took a psychological approach to psychical phenomena, believing that it was foolish to separate "... a class of problems from their natural habitat ...". By 1890 he had resigned from the society, and he became an outspoken critic of parapsychology. Psychical researchers were rarely trained psychologists, and Jastrow thought their research lacked credibility. Given the lack of evidence of psychical phenomena, he believed psychologists should not prioritize disproving claimed psychical phenomenon. In his book The Psychology of Conviction (1918) he included an entire chapter exposing what he called Eusapia Palladino's tricks.

== Anomalistic psychology ==
Jastrow was a leading figure in the field of anomalistic psychology. His book Fact and Fable in Psychology (1900) debunked claims of occultism including Spiritualism, Theosophy and Christian Science. He approached the occult in a scientific manner. He wanted to understand why people were attracted to it, how it gained a foothold in society, and what evidence its supporters used. He wrote that many people considered coincidence, dreams, and premonitions as sources of information above science, and said the role of the scientist was to help the public understand truth from fiction, and to prevent the spreading of erroneous beliefs.

Jastrow studied the psychology of paranormal belief and viewed paranormal phenomena as "totally unscientific and misleading", being the result of delusion, fraud, gullibility and irrationality.

== Other research ==
=== Use of analogy in society ===
Jastrow thought that analogies represented a more primitive way of interpreting the world. He gave many examples of cultures that acted analogously, including the "Zulu chewing a bit of wood to soften the heart ...", and the "Illinois Indians making figures of those whose days they desire to shorten, and stabbing these images in the heart." He wrote about cultures that ate animals to gain their physical attributes; he said this tradition still persisted in his day, through superstitions, rituals, and folk medicine. The underlying motivation for this mentality, Jastrow wrote, was that "one kind of connection ... will bring it to others."

=== Optical illusions ===
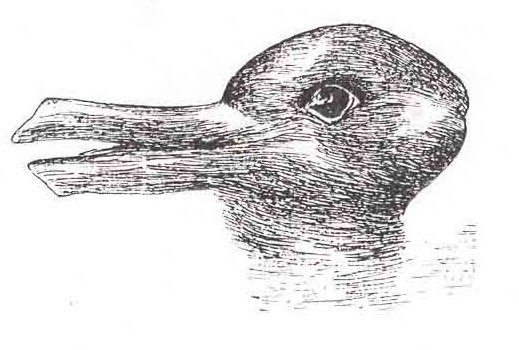
Rabbit Duck

Jastrow was interested in perception, especially eyesight. He thought that eyesight was more complex than a camera, and that the mental processing of images was central to interpretation of the world. He illustrated this through optical illusions, including the rabbit–duck illusion. He believed that what people saw also depended on their emotional state and their surroundings.

=== Involuntary movement ===
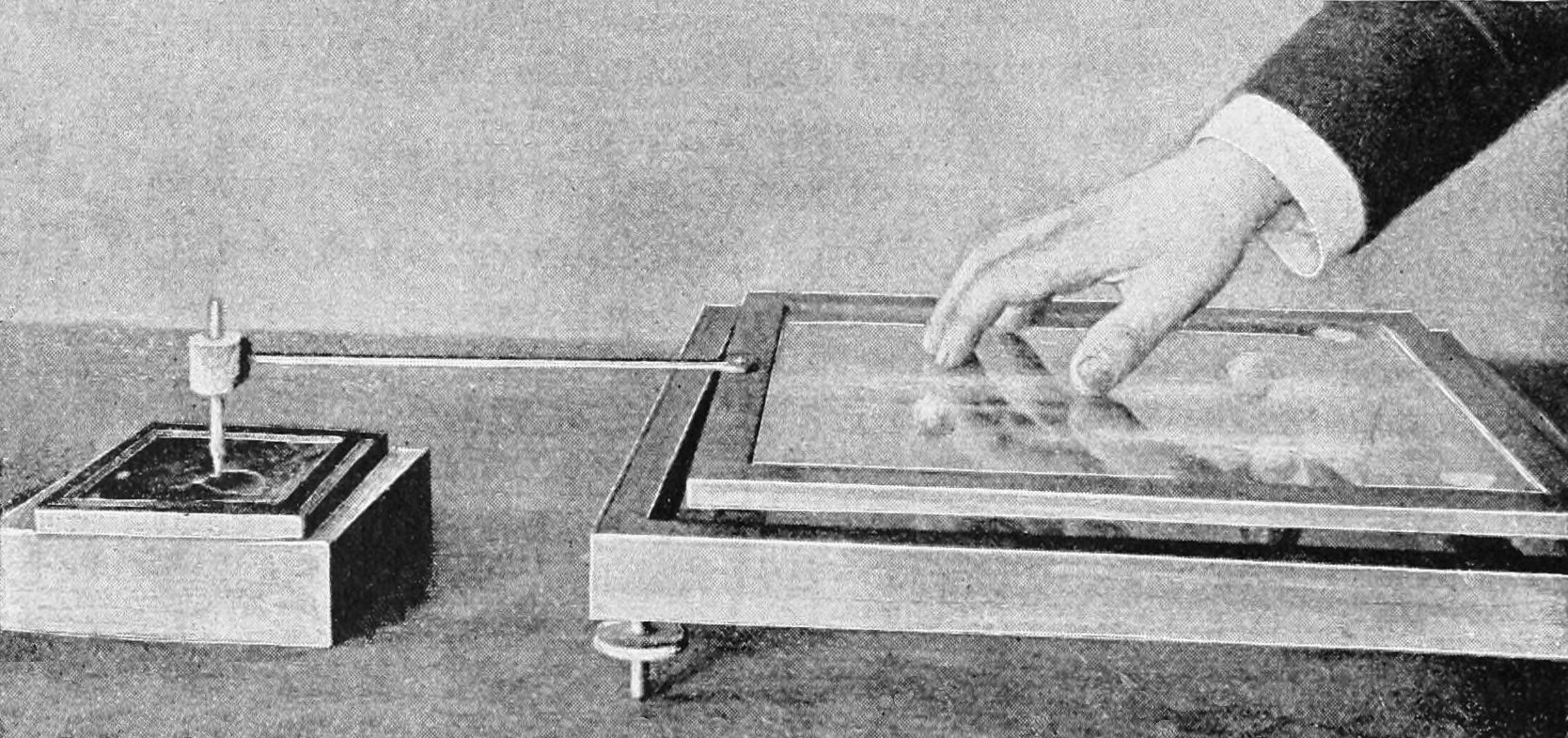
The automatograph

To detect unconscious movement of the hand, Jastrow invented a machine he called the automagraph. He found that when a subject was asked to concentrate on an object, their hand moved unconsciously in that direction. The magnitude of the effect varied across individuals, especially in children, where the movement was more random.

=== Dreams of the blind ===
Jastrow found that people who had lost their eyesight after age six still were able to see in their dreams, and that people who had lost their eyesight before the age of five could not. This same difference in perception and age was true for people with partial vision loss. Jastrow concluded that sight was not innate, and that significant mental development occurred between ages five and seven. He noted that hearing, not sensation, was the primary sense of the blind, in both waking and dream. He collected first-hand accounts of dreams from visually impaired people, including Helen Keller.

=== Criticisms of psychoanalysis and Freud ===
As early as 1913, at the congress of the German Psychiatric Association held in Breslau, Joseph Jastrow criticized psychoanalysis as unscientific and pseudoscience. He published a book (The House that Freud Built.) about it in 1932.

== Publications ==
Jastrow's publications include:

- Charles Sanders Peirce and Joseph Jastrow (1885). "On Small Differences in Sensation". Memoirs of the National Academy of Sciences. 3: 73–83.
- Jastrow, Joseph (1890). The Time-Relations of Mental Phenomena. New York: N.D.C. Hodges. "Time Relations of Mental Phenomena."
- Oldenberg, Hermann; Jastrow, Joseph; Cornill, Carl Heinrich (1890). Epitomes of Three Sciences: Comparative Philology, Psychology, and Old Testament History. Open Court Publishing Company.
- Jastrow, Joseph (1900). Fact and Fable in Psychology. Houghton, Mifflin and Co.
- Jastrow, Joseph (1906). The Subconscious. Houghton, Mifflin. p. 3.
- Jastrow, Joseph (1910). The Qualities of Men: An Essay in Appreciation. Houghton, Mifflin. "The Qualities of Men."
- Jastrow, Joseph (1915). Character and Temperament. Appleton. "Character and Temperament."
- "Charles Peirce as a Teacher" in The Journal of Philosophy, Psychology, and Scientific Methods, v. 13, n. 26, December, 723–726 (1916). Google Books and text-string search.
- Jastrow, Joseph (1918). The Psychology of Conviction: A Study of Beliefs and Attitudes. Houghton Mifflin Co. p. 1. "The Psychology of Conviction."
- Jastrow, Joseph (1932). The House that Freud Built. Greenberg.
- Jastrow, Joseph (1932). Wish and Wisdom: Episodes in the Vagaries of Belief. Appleton-Century.
- Jastrow, Joseph (1936). Story of Human Error. Books for Libraries Press. ISBN 9780836905687.
