= Arthur Shapiro (vision scientist) =

American vision scientist

Arthur G. Shapiro
- Born: October 18, 1964 (age 61); Riverside, California, United States
- Occupation: Vision Scientist
- Years active: 1995 - present
- Employer: American University
- Website: shapirolab.net

Arthur "Art" Shapiro is an American vision scientist and creator of visual illusions. He is the co-editor of the Oxford Compendium of Visual Illusions. He is currently a professor of psychology and computer science with the American University in Washington, D.C., and Director of the Collaborative for Applied Perceptual Research and Innovation (CAPRI).

== Research and recognition ==
Shapiro completed his undergraduate work in mathematics and psychology at U.C. San Diego. He received his PhD in psychology from Columbia University and completed post-doctoral research at the University of Chicago, working with Joel Pokorny and Vivianne C. Smith in the Department of Ophthalmology and Visual Sciences. His research focuses on color, motion, vision in low-light environments, and visual phenomena.

Shapiro's work on motion perception has been featured in news articles, television programming, and viral videos. CuriosityStream (an on-demand streaming service) produced a five-part series on visual illusions of which Shapiro was the narrator and presenter. The New York Times and NPR have each written pieces examining Shapiro's contributions to vision science and motion illusions (e.g. an analysis of the curve ball illusion). The National Geographic program Brain Games utilized Shapiro as a "Motion Expert" to explore human vision and the neuroscience behind several popular motion illusions. Similarly, both USA Today and NBC Washington have featured Shapiro's scientific analysis of #thedress. Shapiro was also featured on several episodes of New England Sport's Network (NESN)'s Baseball Lab.

In 2014, Shapiro was selected to be a member of "The Nifty Fifty", a group of international professionals organized by the USA Science and Engineering Festival to promote the STEM fields to secondary school students across the United States. Other members of the "Nifty Fifty" include Elon Musk (of Tesla Motors and SpaceX), Michael Shermer (of Skeptic), and Sylvester James Gates.

Shapiro was selected as a top-ten finalist to the Best Illusion of the Year Contest twelve times. He has received the first place prize twice. Each of the selected entries are listed and referenced below.

Year	Place	Title & Link
2005	1st	Title: Motion-Illusion Building Blocks
2007	3rd	Title: Where Has All the Motion Gone?
2007	Top-Ten	Title: "Weaves" and the Hermann Grid
2007	Top-Ten	Title: Swimmers, Eels, and other Gradient Illusions
2008	Top-Ten	Title: Dramatically Different Percepts between Foveal and Peripheral Vision
2008	Top-Ten	Title: Perpetual Collisions
2009	1st	Title: The Break of the Curveball
2011	2nd	Title: Grouping by Contrast
2011	Top-Ten	Title: The Exchange of Features, Textures and Faces
2012	3rd	Title: Color Wagon Wheel
2013	2nd	Title: Tusi or Not Tusi
2014	Top-Ten	Title: Hybrid Motion and the Integration of Motion Elements
2015	Top-Ten	Title: Star Wars Scroll Illusion
2016	Top-Ten	Title: Remote Controls
