= International Observe the Moon Night =

Annual event

- Formation: September 18, 2010; 16 years ago
- Purpose: space science and astronomy outreach
- Region served: international
- Website: https://moon.nasa.gov/observe-the-moon-night/

International Observe the Moon Night is an annual public outreach event sponsored by the Lunar Reconnaissance Orbiter mission, the Solar System Exploration Division at NASA's Goddard Space Flight Center, and other NASA and astronomical organizations that encourages observation, appreciation, and understanding of the Moon and its connection to planetary science and exploration.

Participation is open to everyone, by hosting or attending an event or participating as a lunar observer.

First organized in 2010, there are usually over 500 events annually in over 40 countries. They are hosted by universities, observatories, NASA Centers, schools, museums, parks, libraries, and amateur astronomers. Some events are offered both in person and via internet streaming video. The date is selected to be around the first quarter moon, to enhance visibility of lunar topography.

== History ==
The event grew out of two events during the International Year of Astronomy, 2009: "We're at the Moon!", sponsored by the Lunar Reconnaissance Orbiter and Lunar Crater Observation and Sensing Satellite teams to celebrate the arrival of the LRO and LCROSS at the Moon, and "National Observe the Moon Night" in the US.

Dates:

- Saturday, 2009-08-01 (We're at the Moon and National Observe the Moon Night)
- Saturday, 2010-09-18
- Saturday, 2011-10-08
- Saturday, 2012-09-22
- Saturday, 2013-10-12
- Saturday, 2014-09-06
- Saturday, 2015-09-19
- Saturday, 2016-10-08
- Saturday, 2017-10-28
- Saturday, 2018-10-20
- Saturday, 2019-10-05
- Saturday, 2020-09-26
- Saturday, 2021-10-16
- Saturday, 2022-10-01
- Saturday, 2023-10-21
- Saturday, 2024-09-14
- Saturday, 2025-10-04
- Saturday, 2026-09-19

== Organizers ==
- Lunar Reconnaissance Orbiter
- NASA Solar System Exploration Research Virtual Institute
- Planetary Science Institute
- Lunar and Planetary Institute
- CosmoQuest
- Science Festival Alliance
- NASA Night Sky Network
- Astronomical Society of the Pacific
