= Marco Bertamini =

Italian psychologist (born 1966)

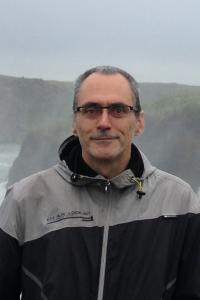
- Born: 6 January 1966 (age 60); Vigevano, Italy
- Education: University of Padova; University of Virginia
- Known for: The Venus effect; The Honeycomb illusion; Visual holes
- Scientific career
- Fields: Perception; Aesthetics; Naive Physics
- Workplaces: University of Liverpool; University of Padova

Marco Bertamini (born 6 January 1966, in Vigevano, Italy) is a professor of psychology in the Department of General Psychology, of the University of Padova, Italy.

He is most known for discovering the Venus Effect and the Honeycomb Illusion. The latter was a finalist of the Best Illusion of the Year Contest in 2015.

== Career ==
Marco Bertamini graduated in Experimental Psychology in 1990 from the University of Padova. From 1999 to 2017 he worked at the University of Liverpool where he established the Visual Perception Lab. His research is mainly focused on visual perception, empirical aesthetics and optical illusions.

== Research ==
=== Symmetry ===
Comparing types of symmetries, Bertamini has described their role in perceptual organisation, using psychophysics, phenomenology, and electrophysiology.

The recently created catalogue of results has over 1 TB of data and is an example of good practice in open science. He also was the co-author of Symmetry in Vision with Lewis Griffin.

=== Venus effect ===
Starting from naive physics he expanded the area into naive optics: children and adults make systematic mistakes in their descriptions of how mirrors work and in their predictions about mirror images. One striking example is the Venus effect, discovered and named by him in 2003.

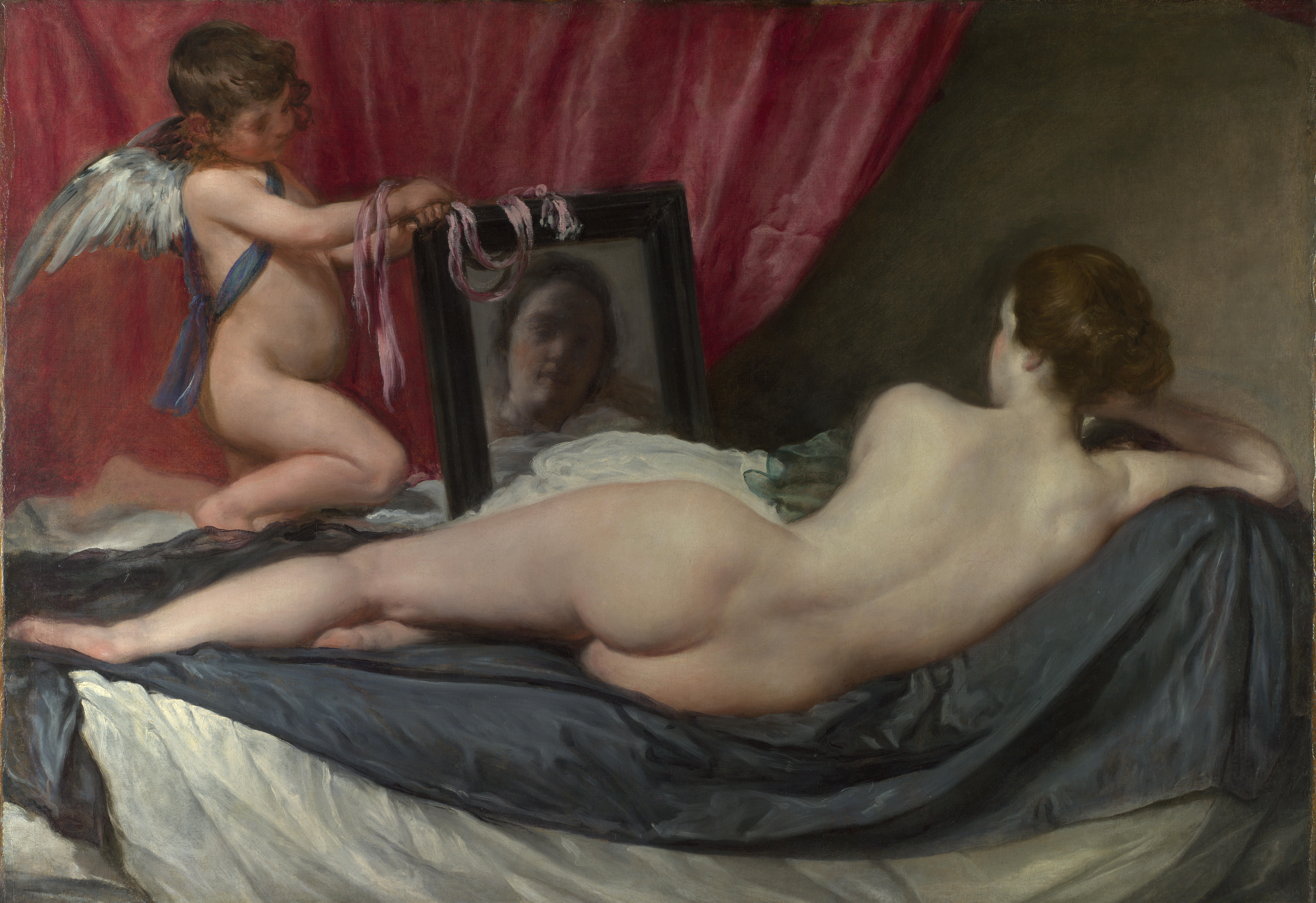
This painting by Diego Velázquez known as the Rokeby Venus is likely to produce a Venus effect.

The effect consist of the fact that viewers of such paintings have the impression that Venus is admiring her own reflection in the mirror. However the viewer sees the face of Venus in the mirror, and they are not directly behind her, therefore what Venus sees in the reflection cannot be the same as what the viewer sees. This is an effect found in various artworks from many time periods. It has been shown to also work in photographs and real life.

In 2017, this effect was included in the Oxford Compendium of Visual Illusions.

== Visual illusions ==
Marco Bertamini has also been nominated as a top ten finalist for the Best Illusion of the Year Contest in 2015 with the Honeycomb Illusion and in 2018 with Once upon a Time Illusion. The honeycomb illusion is an example of a uniform texture not perceived as such, where barbs in the corners of the grid appear clearly visible but only in the segment of the texture that you are directly looking at.

== Activities and recognition ==
In 2015, he was the main organiser of the European Conference in Visual Perception (ECVP) in Liverpool. He is an editor on the following journals: Perception, British Journal of Psychology, and Proceedings of the Royal Society B.

In 2017, he published a book that combines an introduction to visual illusions with an introduction to programming in Python.

Bertamini's work on perception has featured in various news articles, radio appearances and YouTube videos. Robert Krulwich wrote for NPR about Bertamini's work investigating whether people notice inverted images in films such as Yojimbo by Akira Kurosawa. The New York Times has also featured Bertamini's work both regarding mirrors and his criticisms of 'Bite Size' science. He has also had appearances on both British (BBC) and Italian (RAI) national radio to talk about his research.

== See also ==
- Venus effect
