= Napoleonic looting of art in Spain =

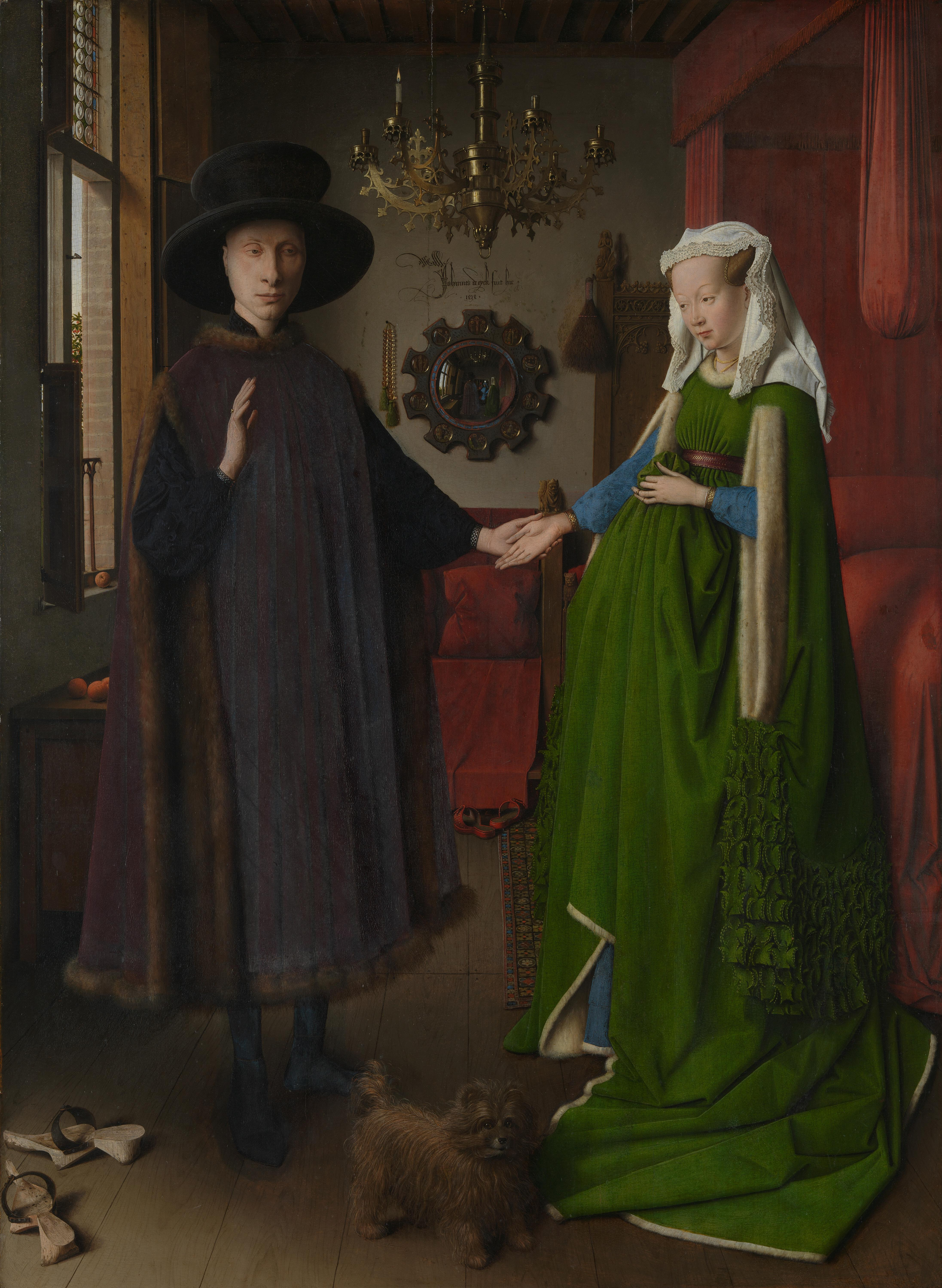
The Arnolfini Portrait by Jan van Eyck, stolen by Scottish officer James Hay during the Battle of Vitoria.

The art looting carried out by the Napoleonic troops and the government of Joseph Bonaparte —imposed by his brother Napoleon— during the Peninsular War (1808–1814) was the most important cultural plunder suffered by Spain.

== Context ==
Napoleon began looting with the artistic heritage of Belgium and the Netherlands in 1794 with the rationale of creating the Napoleon Museum, a synthesis of world art, a symbol of power and culture, which later became the Louvre. The plundering continued in Italy, in 1796, and during his campaigns in Egypt from 1798 to 1801, Napoleon obtained, for example, the Rosetta Stone. Napoleon was the first to systematically steal art in modern times. He wanted to appropriate that greatness and increase the funds of the Louvre museum, which at the time was already among the best in the world. The process used by Napoleon, his officials and generals was:

- Looting under death threats, led by army generals.

- Official seizure with the excuse of creating a National Museum.

- Selection of works by specialized dealers, such as Jean-Baptiste-Pierre Lebrun.

- Transfer of the selected works to Paris.

- Incorporation of the works to the Louvre Museum or sale to other collectors.

The artistic heritage was considered «public utility», a cultural contribution that has to be to the service of the state, by what the works have to translate to France, as dominant state on Europe.

== Looting in Spain ==
When Napoleon and his army arrived in Spain, they had been plundering Europe for a decade. The royal decree of 18 July 1809 suppressed the male religious orders and all of their assets were seized by the state, including the artwork. The invaders also confiscated the art collections of the aristocracy.

The plundering of art was carried out in several ways. The first and most important, was to create a big national museum, the Museo Josefino in the palace of Buenavista, in the image of the Louvre. The museum served as a reason to requisition pictures. As they accumulated the paintings suffered damage from humidity and poor storage, but many also disappeared at the hands of the military and the French custodians. This was the case of Frédéric Quilliet and his group, Maignien, Napoli and the English G. A. Wallis, commissioned to look for and requisition the necessary pictures, that resulted in so much corruption that in 1810 he was relieved of his position. Later it appointed a commission of experts headed by Vivant Denon, director of the Louvre. Denon selected himself 250 paintings more than the original planned, as a «compensation by the military campaign of Spain».

From Madrid and its surroundings they took out more than 1500 pictures and of Seville some 1000. About 300 of these pictures —although, no of the best— and the Treasure of the Dolphin were sent to Paris in May 1813. Joseph Bonaparte employed the enormous quantity of art accumulated as gifts for his friends, as the active generals in the Iberian peninsula, between them Darmagnac, Caulaincourt, Eblé, Faviers, Sebastiani and Desolles.

Some dealers were also very actively involved with the looted art, especially the French Quilliet. Others, like Lebrun, Maignain, the British Nathan and Wallis, and the Dutch Coesvelt, specialised in following the trail of the French troops. Also there was covert operations, like the fraudulent sale of the Venus of the mirror by Quilliet to Wallis.

Especially the art in silver suffered an extreme looting: small and medium size objects, easily transportables and that they can be melted in ingots without leaving trace. The town of Saragossa serve as an example. There are studies about the cases of Navarra, Calahorra, Guipúzcoa or Segovia.

=== Marshal Soult ===
Jean-de-Dieu Soult had a meteoric military career; in just 25 years he became a general and in 1804 reached the rank of marshal. From 1810 he held commands in Spain, first as commander of the second body of the Grande Armée in Spain and Portugal and from 1810 as military Governor of Andalusia. During this time took an impressive particular collection of more than 180 pictures.

At the death of Soult the collection, that had achieved a considerable fame, was auctioned. Real houses and museums of all the world of rushed to bid, with the pictures of the collection widely dispersed.

== End of looting ==
After the French defeat in the Battle of Salamanca, on July 18, 1812, Joseph Bonaparte decided to leave Madrid and head to France in a huge caravan of more than 2,000 cars, the famous "baggage of King Joseph", to which Benito Pérez Galdós dedicated one of his "Episodios Nacionales" (National Episodes) with that same title. The Battle of Vitoria prevented the entourage from reaching France and Joseph Bonaparte had to flee on horseback and leave all his luggage behind him. Many British soldiers turned aside to plunder the abandoned French wagons, containing "the loot of a kingdom". It is estimated that more than £1 million of booty (perhaps £100 million in modern equivalent) was seized, but the gross abandonment of discipline caused an enraged Wellington to write in a dispatch to Earl Bathurst, "We have in the service the scum of the earth as common soldiers". The larger paintings and sculptures were saved from plunder thanks to the fact that General Maucune had been twelve hours ahead of the King's caravan and the objects were able to reach Paris without incident. These paintings would be among those that could be recovered later thanks to the action.

Wellington immediately sent 300 recovered works to his brother, Henry Wellesley, in England. Upon his return to Great Britain, Wellington decided on his own to return the paintings, so his brother, Henry, at that time ambassador in Madrid, sent a letter to Ferdinand VII in 1814, informing him that he was in possession of the artistic treasure. After receiving no response, he tried again in September 1816 in a letter to Fernán Núñez, the Spanish ambassador in London.

He received the following letter:

Hon. Mister. Dear Duke: I have accompanied you with the official response that I have received from the Court and from it I deduce that His Majesty, moved by your delicacy, does not wish to deprive you of what came into your possession by means that are as fair as they are honorable. Such is my opinion of the case, and so I believe that you should leave the matter as it is and not refer to it further... the devoted friend and affectionate cousin of his who greets you. Fernán Núñez

Thus, Ferdinand VII left the paintings definitively in the hands of Wellington, "The Spanish gift", who hung them in his house, Apsley House, which has become a museum belonging to English Heritage.

== Recovery of some paintings ==
General Miguel Ricardo de Álava was commissioned by the government of Ferdinand VII to recover the paintings stolen by the French generals. After various letters requesting the paintings, in an interview with King Louis XVIII he got the answer "I neither give them, nor am I opposed." The next day, September 23, Nicolás Minussir, Álava's assistant, along with the painter Francisco Lacoma and 200 British troops went to the Louvre with the intention of recovering the paintings. There was strong opposition from the museum's director, Vivant Denon, who flatly refused to hand over any paintings, and even from the people of Paris, which led to tense situations, but twelve paintings were managed to be removed. The next day they went early to avoid problems and managed to remove another 284 paintings and 108 various objects. The objects were stored at the Spanish embassy in Paris, to be sent to Brussels and then by ship from Antwerp to Cádiz, to avoid transport by land through France and the risk of incidents with the French. They arrived at the San Fernando Academy of Fine Arts in Madrid on June 30, 1816.

Lavallée confirmed on March 10, 1816, that a total of 2,065 paintings had been returned, of which Saxony (Dresden) recovered 421, Austria 323, Spain 284 (in addition to 108 miscellaneous objects), Brunswick 230, Netherlands 210, Schwerin 190, Prussia 119 (in addition to 268 bronzes and 463 cameos); Tuscany 57, Sardinia 59, Modena 24, Venice 15, Verona 6, and Milan 7. Eight Spanish paintings remained in the Louvre. It is estimated that approximately half of the looted works did not return to their places of origin; the vast majority stayed in France.

== Final dispersion ==
Starting in the 1820s, looted paintings began to be sold in France. On the one hand, there was always the possibility that Spain would demand the paintings back, on the other, decorating with stolen paintings was so socially awkward. Heirs often preferred money to art.

The Spanish government tried to recover some paintings, even by buying them, but it was not possible to do so in many cases. For example, Soult flatly refused to sell anything that was not for astronomical prices, let alone deliver them, so it was thought of going through the courts, to ask for receipts for the sales, but Soult was protected as a Minister of Defense and later as president of the Council of Ministers of King Louis Philippe I. Not even King Louis Philippe was able to get his collection sold to the French state for a reasonable price. It was not until his death in 1851 that his sons decided to sell the collection: 163 paintings, of which 110 were Spanish. The main buyers were the Louvre, the National Gallery and Tsar Nicholas I of Russia.

Auction houses such as Erard, Boursault, Frainays or Huard, and individuals continued to regularly sell paintings from Spain. In 1857 the collection of General d'Armagnac was sold and in 1868 that of Lejeune. These paintings mostly ended up in the Louvre, the National Gallery in London, the Hermitage Museum in Saint Petersburg and the Museum of Fine Arts in Budapest. A few others ended up in the Wallace Collection, the Walker Art Gallery in Liverpool, the Palazzo Bianco in Genoa, and the national galleries in Washington and Ottawa.
