= Jean Barthélemy Darmagnac =

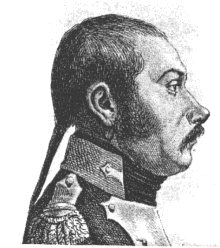
- Jean Barthélemy Darmagnac
- Born: 1 November 1766; Toulouse, France
- Died: 12 December 1855 (aged 89) Bordeaux, France
- Allegiance: France
- Branch: Infantry
- Service years: (France) 1791–1831
- Rank: General of Division
- Conflicts: War of the First Coalition; Battle of Bassano; French invasion of Egypt; Battle of the Pyramids; Siege of Acre; War of the Third Coalition; Battle of Austerlitz; Peninsular War; Battle of Medina de Rioseco; Battle of Vitoria; Battle of the Pyrenees; Battle of the Bidassoa; Battle of Nivelle; Battle of the Nive; Battle of Orthez; Battle of Toulouse
- Awards: Légion d'Honneur, GO 1823; Order of Saint-Louis, CC 1821
- Other work: Baron of the Empire, 1810; Vicomte, 1821

Jean Barthélemy Claude Toussaint Darmagnac (French pronunciation: [ʒɑ̃ baʁtelemi klod tusɛ̃ daʁmaɲak]; 1 November 1766 – 12 December 1855) became a French division commander during the Napoleonic Wars. In 1791, he joined a volunteer battalion and soon became a captain. He fought with the 32nd Line Infantry Demi-Brigade against the Austrians in Italy. He participated in the French campaign in Egypt and Syria, being promoted to lead the regiment after distinguishing himself at the Battle of the Pyramids. He was severely wounded at Acre and promoted to general of brigade in 1801.

Darmagnac fought at Austerlitz in 1805 and led the Paris guard in 1806–1807. Going to Spain, he was wounded at Medina de Rioseco and became a general of division in 1808.

After serving as provincial governor in Old Castile, where he plundered many works of art, especially in Burgos, and allowed the looting of the tomb of the Cid Campeador in the monastery of San Pedro de Cardeña.

He assumed command of a combat division at Vitoria, the Pyrenees, the Bidassoa, the Nivelle, the Nive, Orthez, and Toulouse. After holding interior commands under the Bourbon Restoration, he retired in 1831. His surname is one of the names inscribed under the Arc de Triomphe in Column 36.
