= Venus effect =

Phenomenon in the psychology of perception

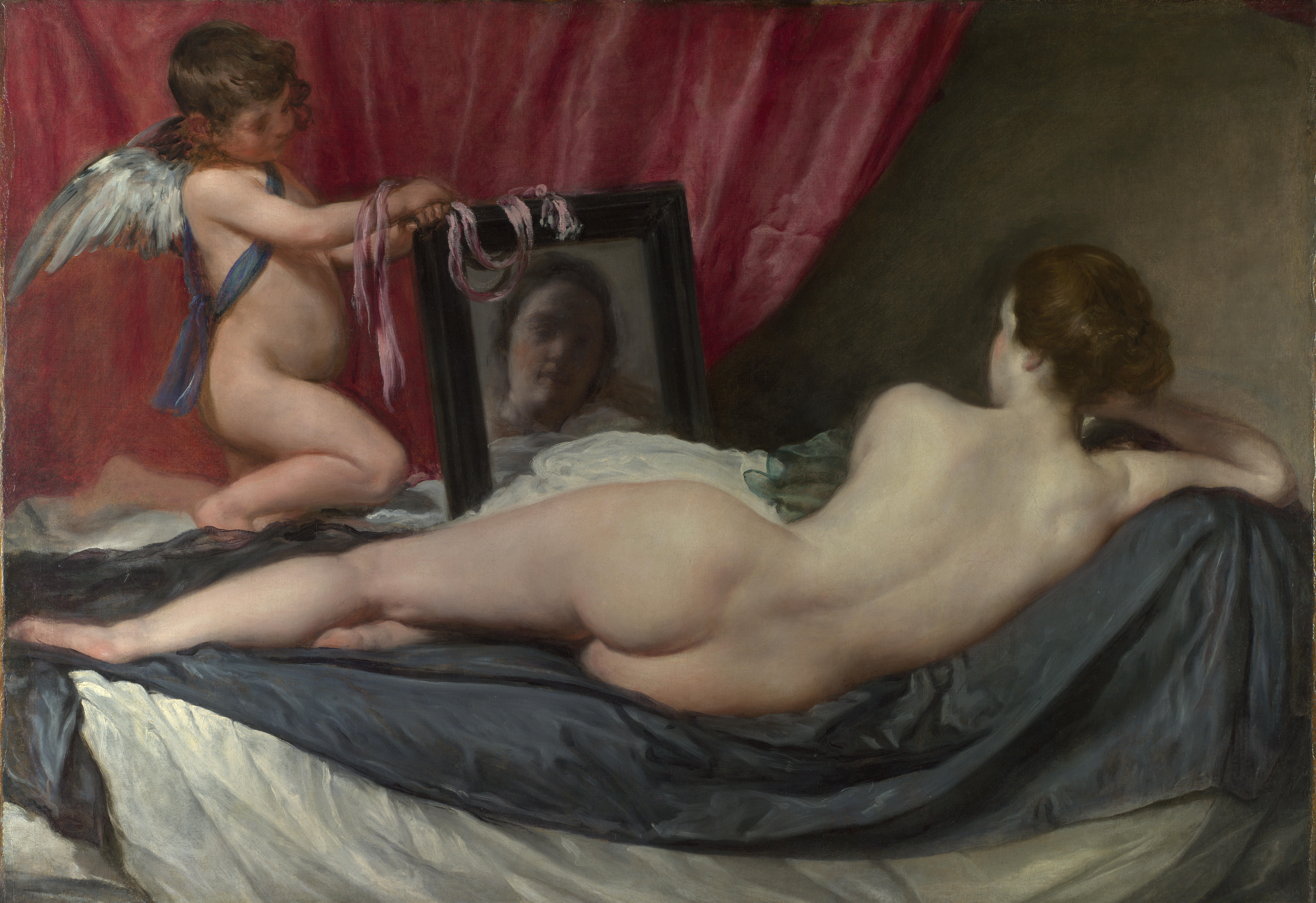
This painting by Diego Velázquez known as the Rokeby Venus is likely to produce a Venus effect.

The Venus effect is a phenomenon in the psychology of perception, named after various paintings of Venus gazing into a mirror, such as Diego Velázquez's Rokeby Venus, Titian's Venus with a Mirror, and Veronese's Venus with a Mirror. It was discovered in 2003 by Marco Bertamini.

Viewers of such paintings have the impression that Venus is admiring her own reflection in the mirror. However the viewer sees the face of Venus in the mirror, and they are not directly behind her, therefore what Venus sees in the reflection cannot be the same as what the viewer sees. It would be more logical if the viewer were to conclude that Venus is looking at the reflection of the viewer, or in the case of the original setting, the reflection of the painter.

This line of research highlights that most people may hold beliefs that are inconsistent with observable phenomena. This field is known as naïve physics or intuitive physics.

This psychological effect is often used in the cinema, where an actor is shown apparently looking at themselves in the mirror. What viewers see is different from what the actor sees, because the camera is not right behind the actor, but the position of the actor is often chosen so that their image is nicely framed in the mirror for the camera.

Although the name of the effect refers to a woman, Venus, the effect is more general. The effect is seen with an animal apparently looking at itself in a mirror in The Lady and the Unicorn (French: La Dame à la licorne) tapestries, where the unicorn appears to be gazing at its own reflection as it kneels on the ground.

Bertamini et al. conducted additional studies and confirmed that the Venus effect also occurs with photographs, and in real life when the person and the mirror are seen in a room.

== Gallery ==
Titian's Venus with a Mirror, c. 1555

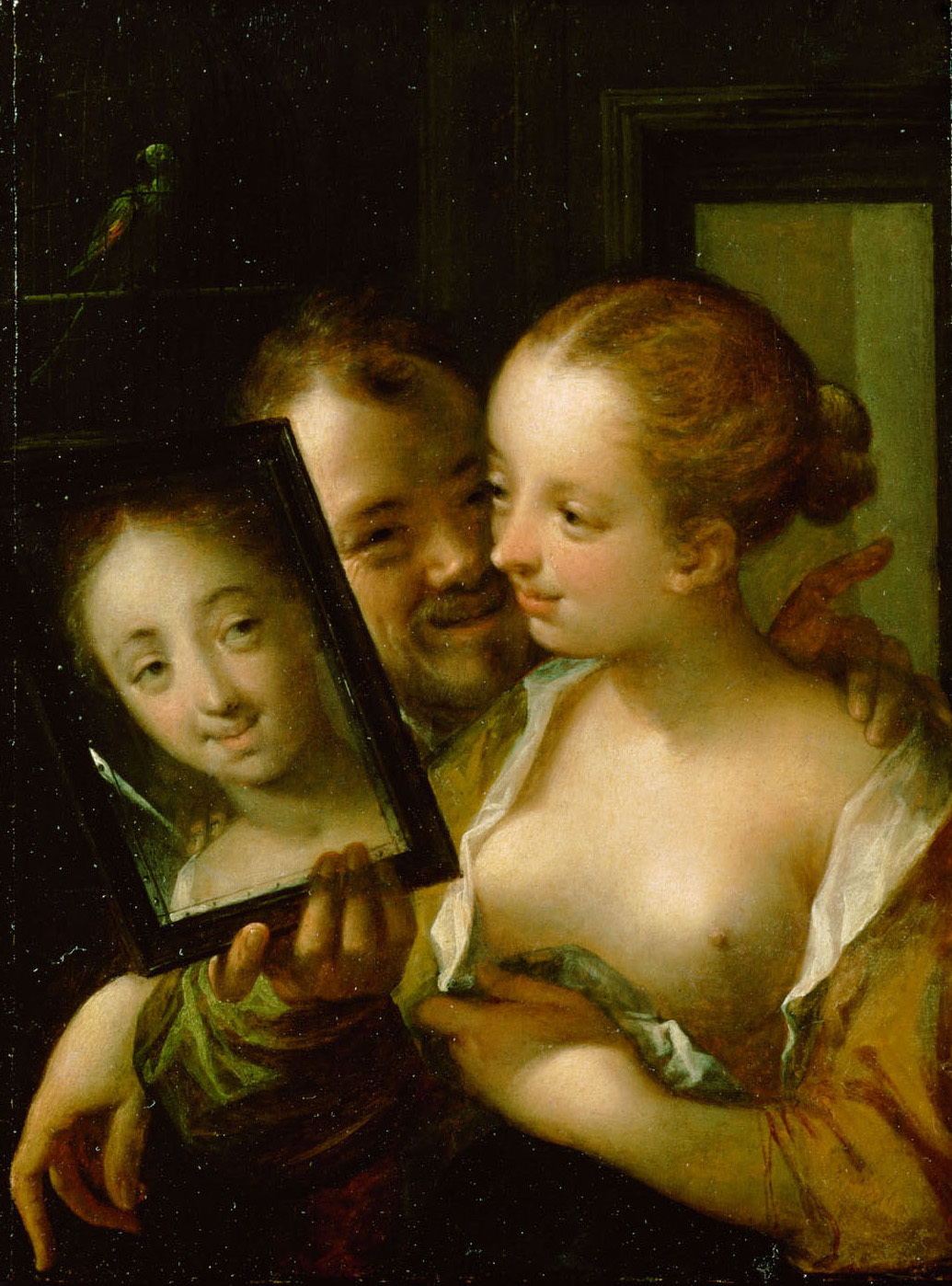
Hans von Aachen's Couple with a mirror, c. 1596.

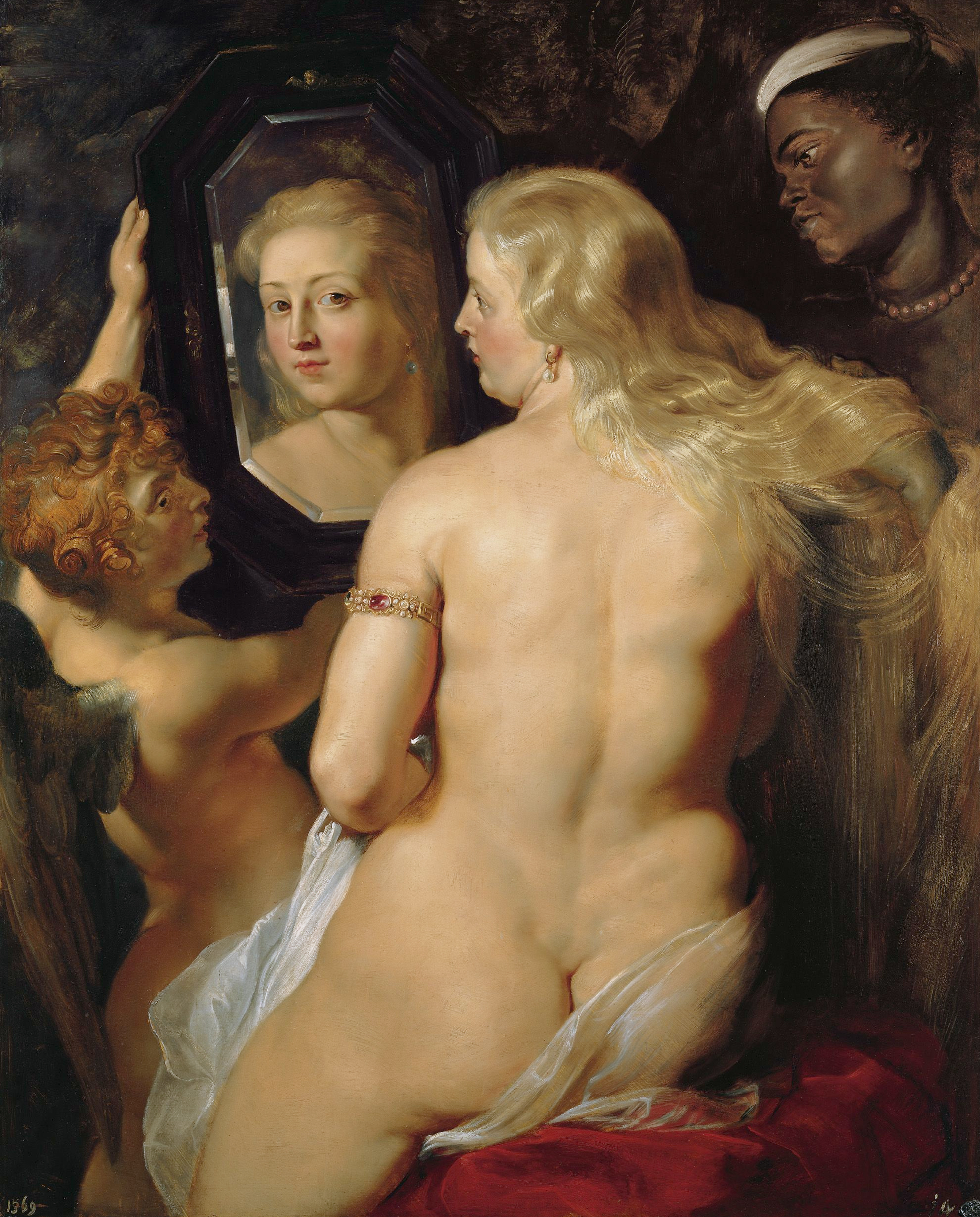
Peter Paul Rubens's Venus at the Mirror, c. 1614–15.

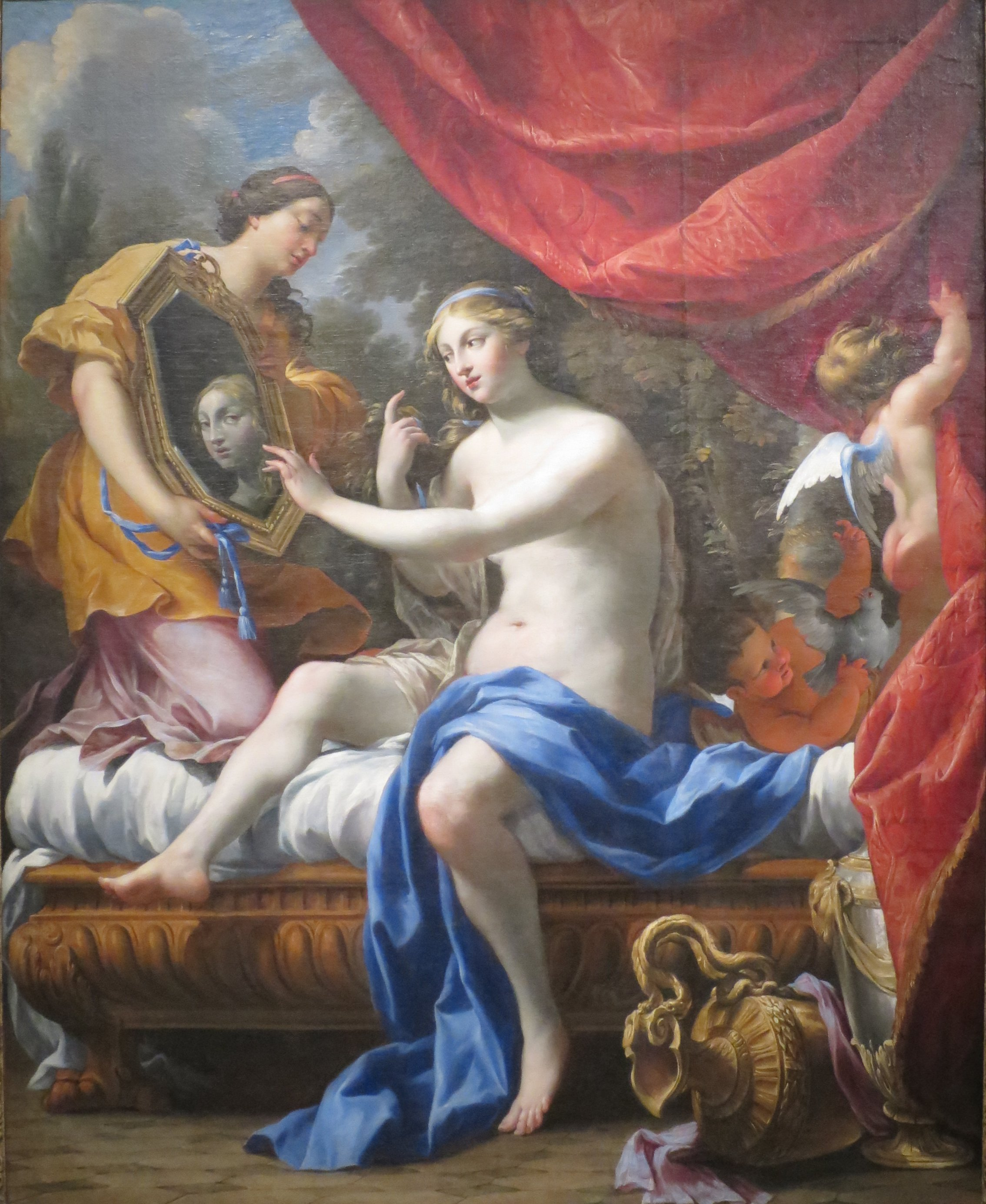
Simon Vouet's The Toilet of Venus, c. 1628.
