= George Augustus Wallis =

British artist

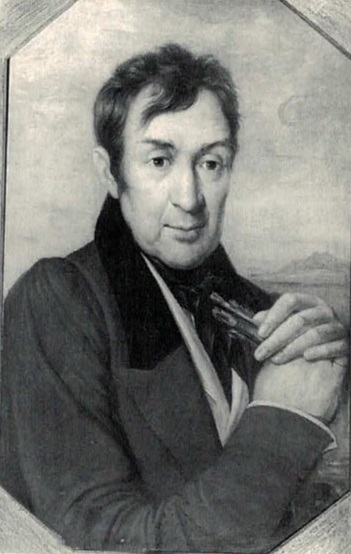
George Augustus Wallis, Self Portrait, c. 1805, oil on canvas, 57.5 x 37.6 cm., Sold Heidelberg, Winterburg-Kunst, 11 April 1997, lot 607.

George Augustus Wallis (Merton, Surrey, 1761 - Florence, 1847) was an English painter, active in Italy.

Wallis began his career as a protégé of George Greville, 2nd Earl of Warwick, a serious patron of the arts who supported the artist financially from at least 1787. It has been suggested that a painting now in Salisbury House, Des Moines, Iowa, acquired from Warwick Castle in 1925, may be an early self-portrait of the artist. In 1788 Wallis began a tour of Italy, a trip likely to have been funded by the Earl, and visited Rome, Naples and Sicily.

He trained in the environment of neoclassical German artists, first in Naples, where he met Philipp Hackert, then in Rome, where around 1794 he frequented Asmus Jacob Carstens, Gottlieb Schick and especially Joseph Anton Koch. In 1806, Wallis became a member of the Roman Academy.

In the late 1790s gained reputation as a 'democrat' and sympathiser of the French. Ostracised on his return to London in 1806, and spent rest of his life on the Continent: 1807-10 in Spain, 1810-18 in Germany (mostly Heidelberg), and from 1818 settled in Florence. He taught at the Accademia di Belle Arti in Florence, where he focused on portraits and painted frescoes.

He also operated as an art dealer during his time in Italy, and later in Spain, during the Peninsular War, where he frequently worked for British clients. In fact, he also worked for the Scottish dealer William Buchanan, acquiring, amongst other works, Velázquez’s celebrated Rokeby Venus.

He died in Florence, in 1847.

== Style ==
Initially his style was neoclassical with German influences. The work, The castle of Heidelberg (1812, private collection) is strongly influenced by the German canons and makes Wallis a pioneer of the romantic landscape. Later he developed his own style, characterized by a particular treatment of light. Examples of this are the numerous drawings and watercolours, many of which are undated, preserved in the Thorvaldsen Museum, in Copenhagen, as well as several letters, due to the close relationship between the English painter and the Danish sculptor.

From 1817 Wallis exhibited continuously at the Academy of Florence, his city of choice (from which he moved away only for a period between 1820 and 1829), imposing his particular kind of view where the influences of the protoromanticism of Salvator Rosa were grafted on the canonical schemes proposed by Nicolas Poussin, Claude Lorrain and Gaspard Dughet.

His oil sketches show him to have been one of the more important figures in the development of painting directly from nature.

He had a son, Trajan, also a painter, who in 1819 executed "The Martyrdom of Santa Cristina", currently in Florence, in the Church of Santi Vito e Modesto in Bellosguardo.

== Collections ==
Wallis' work is held in the collections of the British Museum and the National Gallery of Art, the National Galleries of Scotland, the Fitzwilliam Museum, the Yale Center for British Art, the Walker Art Gallery, among others.

== Sources ==
- E. Bénézit (ed.), Dictionnaire des peintres, sculpteurs, dessinateurs et graveurs, VIII, ed. 1966, p. 658.
- Monika von Wild, George Augustus Wallis (1761-1847), Monographie und Oeuvrekatalog, Frankfurt/M, P. Lang, 1996.
- C. Sisi, Nota sul paesaggio romantico in Toscana, in Arte collezionismo conservazione. Scritti in onore di Marco Chiarini, Firenze 2004, pp.394-398.
- F. Petrucci, Giuseppe Bezzuoli e Augusto Wallis tra San Vivaldo e Montaione, in "Artista" 2011, pp.34-43.
