= List of 2006 films based on actual events =

This is a list of films and miniseries that are based on actual events. All films on this list are from American production unless indicated otherwise.

== 2006 ==
- The 9/11 Commission Report (2006) – disaster drama television film following all of the developments leading up to and through the attacks in New York City and at The Pentagon on September 11, 2001 based on the 9/11 Commission Report
- 9/11: The Twin Towers (2006) – disaster drama television film recreating a minute-by-minute account of what happened inside the Twin Towers of the World Trade Center in New York City during the September 11 attacks
- 10th & Wolf (2006) – crime drama film based on a true story of a mob war in South Philadelphia
- 300 (2006) – historical drama film depicting a fictionalized retelling of the Battle of Thermopylae in the Greco-Persian Wars
- A Girl Like Me: The Gwen Araujo Story (2006) – biographical drama television film dramatizing the events surrounding the 2002 murder of Gwen Araujo, a transgender teenager who was murdered after acquaintances discovered that she had male genitalia
- A Guide to Recognizing Your Saints (2006) – biographical drama film describing author, director, and musician Dito Montiel's youth in Astoria, New York during the 1980s
- A Harlot's Progress (2006) – British drama television film based on the series of paintings entitled A Harlot's Progress by William Hogarth, inspired by his interactions with an eighteenth-century prostitute Mary Collins
- A Little Thing Called Murder (2006) – comedy drama television film based on a true story of convicted murderer Sante Kimes
- A Ton of Luck (Spanish: Soñar no Cuesta Nada) (2006) – Colombian black comedy film following a group of anti-guerrilla soldiers, whose lives are turned upside down after finding $45 million hidden in the jungle, based on a true story
- After Thomas (2006) – British drama television film based on the true story of Scottish child Dale Gardner and his dog Henry
- Alien Autopsy (2006) – British comedy drama film depicting the events surrounding the famous "alien autopsy" film promoted by Ray Santilli
- Alpha Dog (2006) – crime drama film based on the true story of the kidnapping and murder of Nicholas Markowitz in 2000
- Amazing Grace (2006) – British-American biographical drama film about the abolitionist campaign against the slave trade in the British Empire, led by William Wilberforce, who was responsible for steering anti-slave trade legislation through the British parliament
- The Amazing Grace (2006) – Nigerian-British historical drama film telling the story of British slave trader John Newton's voyage to West Africa and the events that inspired him to write the world's most popular hymn, Amazing Grace
- Ancient Rome: The Rise and Fall of an Empire (2006) – British biographical drama miniseries with each episode looking at a different key turning point in the history of the Roman Republic and Empire
- The Art of Crying (Danish: Kunsten at Græde i Kor) (2006) – Danish drama film about an 11-year-old boy's struggle to hold intact his bizarre family with its abusive father, mother in denial, and rebellious sister during the social unrest of the early 1970s, based on an autobiographical novel by Erling Jepsen
- Baptism of Blood (Portuguese: Batismo de Sangue) (2006) – Brazilian biographical drama film following the Dominican friar Frei Tito's resistance against Brazilian military dictatorship
- Bartali: The Iron Man (Italian: Gino Bartali – L'intramontabile) (2006) – Italian biographical drama television film depicting real life events of road racing cyclist Gino Bartali, and particularly his rivality with Fausto Coppi
- Beau Brummell: This Charming Man (2006) – British historical drama television film about the life of Beau Brummell
- Beautiful Dreamer (2006) – romantic drama film loosely based on real-life events that occurred on a Consolidated B-24 Liberator bombing mission during World War II and the aftermath of the war as it affected a small family
- Bernard and Doris (2006) – British-American romantic drama television film depicting a semi-fictionalized account of the relationship that developed between socialite heiress and philanthropist Doris Duke and her self-destructive Irish butler Bernard Lafferty later in her life
- Black Book (Dutch: Zwartboek) (2006) – Dutch war thriller drama film about a young Jewish woman in the Netherlands who becomes a spy for the resistance during World War II after tragedy befalls her in an encounter with the Nazis, based on several true events and characters
- The Black Dahlia (2006) – American-French-German neo-noir crime thriller film inspired by the widely sensationalized murder of Elizabeth Short
- Blackbeard (2006) – adventure drama miniseries based on the pirate Blackbeard
- Blackbeard: Terror at Sea (2006) – British adventure drama television film about the pirate Blackbeard
- Bobby (2006) – biographical crime drama film depicting a fictionalized account of the hours leading up to the 5 June 1968, shooting of U.S. Senator Robert F. Kennedy in the kitchen of the Ambassador Hotel in Los Angeles following his win of the 1968 Democratic presidential primary in California
- The Borgia (Spanish: Los Borgia) (2006) – Spanish-Italian biographical drama film about the bloody dynasty that spawned a pope, Alexander VI, as well as the role model for Machiavelli's "The Prince", his son Cesare Borgia, and a legend of femme duplicity, daughter Lucrezia Borgia
- Cannibal (2006) – German horror film based on the true story of Armin Meiwes who killed and ate a man whom he met on the Internet
- Catch a Fire (2006) – British-American-French-South African biographical thriller film about activists against apartheid in South Africa
- Children of Glory (Hungarian: Szabadság, szerelem) (2006) – Hungarian historical drama film about Hungary's Revolution of 1956 and the "Blood in the Water" match
- Christmas at Maxwell's (2006) – drama film about a family trying to cope with a cancer diagnosis based upon Laufer's real-life experiences
- Chronicle of an Escape (Spanish: Crónica de una fuga) (2006) – Argentine historical drama film telling the true story of four men who narrowly escaped death at the hands of a military death squad during Argentina's last civil-military dictatorship (1976–1983)
- Color of the Cross (2006) – Christian drama film about the last 48 hours in the life of Jesus Christ
- The Conclave (2006) – Canadian-German historical drama film centring on the conclave of 1458, which took place five years after the fall of Constantinople to the Turks
- Copying Beethoven (2006) – historical drama film depicting a fictionalized take on the triumphs and heartaches of Ludwig van Beethoven's last years
- Days of Glory (French: Indigènes) (2006) – French-Moroccan-Belgian-Algerian war drama film dealing with the contribution of North African soldiers to the Free French Forces during the Second World War and with the discrimination against them
- The Death of Poe (2006) – horror drama film telling the tragic story of the mysterious disappearance and death of the American author Edgar Allan Poe
- Dieter: The Film (German: Dieter: Der Film) (2006) – German animated biographical film about German musician Dieter Bohlen and his work with Modern Talking
- Dresden (2006) – German war drama television film about the bombing of Dresden in World War II
- Driving Lessons (2006) – British comedy drama film focusing on the relationship between a shy teenaged boy and an ageing eccentric actress, inspired by director Jeremy Brock's teen experience working one summer for Peggy Ashcroft
- Eight Below (2006) – survival drama film inspired by the 1958 ill-fated Japanese scientific expedition to the South Pole, its dramatic rescue from the severe weather conditions on the return journey, the relationship between the scientists and their loyal and hard-working Sakhalin huskies, particularly the lead dogs Taro and Jiro, and the fates of the 15 dogs left behind to fend for themselves
- El Benny (2006) – Cuban musical drama film based on the life of the famous Cuban musician Benny Moré
- El Cantante (2006) – biographical drama film based on the life of the late salsa singer Héctor Lavoe
- Elizabeth David: A Life in Recipes (2006) – British biographical drama television film depicting the life of the cookery writer Elizabeth David
- Factory Girl (2006) – biographical drama film based on the rapid rise and fall of 1960s underground film star and socialite Edie Sedgwick, known for her association with the artist Andy Warhol
- Faith like Potatoes (2006) – South African biographical drama film following Angus Buchan and his family's move from Zambia to South Africa and chronicling his Christian faith throughout that time
- Fatal Desire (2006) – crime drama television film inspired by the real life case against Sharee Miller
- Fearless (Mandarin: 霍元甲) (2006) – Chinese-Hong Kong biographical martial arts film loosely based on the life of Huo Yuanjia, a Chinese martial artist who challenged foreign fighters in highly publicized events, restoring pride and nationalism to China at a time when Western imperialism and Japanese manipulation were eroding the country in the final years of the Qing Dynasty before the birth of the Republic of China
- Find Me Guilty (2006) – courtroom comedy drama film based on the true story of the longest Mafia trial in American history
- Flags of Our Fathers (2006) – war drama film about the 1945 Battle of Iwo Jima, the five Marines and one Navy corpsman who were involved in Raising the Flag on Iwo Jima, and the after effects of that event on their lives
- Flight 93 (2006) – disaster drama television film chronicling the events onboard United Airlines Flight 93 during the September 11 attacks in 2001
- Flyboys (2006) – American-British war drama film about the enlistment, training, and combat experiences of a group of young Americans who volunteered to become fighter pilots in the Lafayette Escadrille, the 124th air squadron formed by the French in 1916
- The Flying Scotsman (2006) – British sport drama film based on the life and career of Scottish amateur cyclist Graeme Obree
- For One Night (2006) – drama television film based on the true story of Gerica McCrary, who made headlines in 2002 by getting Taylor County High School in her hometown of Butler, Georgia, to integrate the prom after thirty-one years of segregation
- Francisco de Miranda (2006) – Venezuelan biographical drama film depicting the life of Venezuelan independence hero Francisco de Miranda
- Fur (2006) – romantic drama film about iconic American photographer Diane Arbus, who was known for her strange, disturbing images
- Ghosts (2006) – British disaster drama film based on the 2004 Morecambe Bay cockling disaster
- Glory Road (2006) – sport drama film based on a true story surrounding the events leading to the 1966 NCAA University Division Basketball Championship
- The Go Master (Japanese: 呉清源 極みの棋譜; Mandarin: 吳清源) (2006) – Japanese-Chinese biographical drama film about the renowned twentieth century Go master Wu Qingyuan, better known as Go Seigen, the Japanese pronunciation of his name
- The Good Battle - Don Pietro Pappagallo (Italian: La buona battaglia – Don Pietro Pappagallo) (2006) – Italian biographical miniseries based on the true story of Don Pietro Pappagallo, a Catholic priest and Italian anti-fascist who assisted victims of Nazism and Fascism in Rome during World War II and was arrested and executed in the Ardeatine Caves massacre on 24 March 1944
- The Good Shepherd (2006) – spy drama film loosely based on real events of James Jesus Angleton, advertised as telling the untold story of the birth of counterintelligence in the Central Intelligence Agency
- Goya's Ghosts (2006) – Spanish-American biographical drama film about Francisco Goya and the Spanish Inquisition
- Gridiron Gang (2006) – biographical sport drama film loosely based on the true story of the Kilpatrick Mustangs during the 1990 season
- Grimm Love (German: Rohtenburg) (2006) – German psychological horror film inspired by the Armin Meiwes cannibal murder case
- H. G. Wells: War with the World (2006) – British biographical drama television film telling the life story of the British author H. G. Wells
- Halim (Arabic: حليم) (2006) – Egyptian biographical film about the Egyptian singer Abdel Halim Hafez
- The Hands (Spanish: Las manos) (2006) – Argentine-Italian biographical drama film inspired by the life and work of Catholic priest Mario Pantaleo
- Hannibal (2006) – British historical television film centring on the Italian campaign of Hannibal, the famous Carthaginian general during the Second Punic War
- Heavens Fall (2006) – crime drama film based on the Scottsboro Boys incident of 1931
- The Hoax (2006) – comedy drama film recounting Clifford Irving's elaborate hoax of publishing an autobiography of Howard Hughes that he purportedly helped write, without ever having talked with Hughes
- Hollywoodland (2006) – mystery drama film presenting a fictionalized account of the circumstances surrounding the death of actor George Reeves, the star of the 1950s film Superman and the Mole Men and television series Adventures of Superman
- Housewife, 49 (2006) – British war drama television film based on the wartime diaries of Nella Last
- Hunt Angels (2006) – Australian biographical drama film re-enacting the guerrilla filmmaking techniques of Rupert Kathner and Alma Brooks in 1939
- The Impressionists (2006) – British biographical drama miniseries reconstructing the origins of the Impressionist art movement
- Infamous (2006) – biographical crime drama film based on George Plimpton's 1997 book, Truman Capote: In Which Various Friends, Enemies, Acquaintances, and Detractors Recall His Turbulent Career and covering the period from the late 1950s through the mid-1960s, during which Truman Capote researched and wrote his bestseller In Cold Blood
- Invincible (2006) – biographical sport drama film about Vince Papale who played for the Philadelphia Eagles from 1976 to 1978 with the help of his coach, Dick Vermeil
- JK (2006) – Brazilian biographical drama miniseries about the life of former president of Brazil Juscelino Kubitschek
- Karla – psychological crime thriller film based on the crimes of Canadian serial killers Paul Bernardo and Karla Homolka
- Karol: The Pope, The Man (Italian: Karol, un Papa rimasto uomo) (2006) – Italian biographical drama miniseries chronicling Pope John Paul II's life as pope in flashbacks from the 22 October 1978 papal inauguration to his death in 2005
- Kenneth Williams: Fantabulosa! (2006) – British comedy drama television film based on the diaries of British comic actor Kenneth Williams
- The Killing of John Lennon (2006) – British-American biographical film about Mark David Chapman's plot to kill musician John Lennon
- Klimt (2006) – Austrian art-house biographical film about the life of the Austrian Symbolist painter Gustav Klimt
- Kokoda (2006) – Australian war drama film based on the experiences of Australian troops fighting Japanese forces during the 1942 Kokoda Track campaign
- Krakatoa: The Last Days (2006) – British biographical drama television film based upon four eyewitness accounts of the 1883 eruption of Krakatoa, an active stratovolcano between the islands of Sumatra and Java, present day Indonesia
- The Last King of Scotland (2006) – German-British historical drama film depicting the dictatorship of Ugandan President Idi Amin through the perspective of Nicholas Garrigan, a fictional Scottish doctor
- The Last Train (German: Der letzte Zug) (2006) – German historical war film depicting the fate of some of the last remaining Jews in Berlin, who in April 1943 were rounded up at the Berlin-Grunewald station and sent to the Nazi concentration camp at Auschwitz
- The Lavender List (2006) – British political drama television film chronicling the events that led to the drafting of the so-called "Lavender List", a satirical name given to Harold Wilson's controversial 1976 resignation honours
- Letters from Iwo Jima (Japanese: 硫黄島からの手紙) (2006) – war drama film portraying the Battle of Iwo Jima from the perspective of the Japanese soldiers
- Libertas (2006) – Croatian biographical drama film about the 16th-century playwright Marin Držić and his conflict with authorities of the Republic of Ragusa
- Life Is Not A Fairy Tale: The Fantasia Barrino Story (2006) – biographical drama television film describing the life of American Idol (season 3) winner Fantasia Barrino, and her rise to national prominence
- Lonely Hearts (2006) – neo-noir drama film based on the true story of the notorious "Lonely Hearts Killers" spree killing of the 1940s, Martha Beck and Raymond Fernandez
- Longford (2006) – British biographical crime drama television film centring on Labour Party peer Lord Longford and his campaign for the parole of Moors Murderer Myra Hindley
- The Lovers of Flore (French: Les Amants du Flore) (2006) – French biographical drama television film about the relationship between Jean-Paul Sartre and Simone de Beauvoir beginning with their university years, then the following 20 years through the wartime, post-war fame and publication of Le Deuxième Sexe
- Marie Antoinette (2006) – French-American-Japanese historical drama film based on the life of Queen Marie Antoinette in the years leading to the French Revolution
- Matti: Hell Is for Heroes (Finnish: Matti) (2006) – Finnish biographical sport drama film about Finnish skijumper Matti Nykänen
- Milarepa (Tibetan: མི་ལ་རས་པའི་རྣམ་ཐར།།) (2006) – Bhutanese Tibetan-language biographical adventure film about the life of the most famous Tibetan tantric yogi, the eponymous Milarepa
- Miss Potter (2006) – British-American biographical drama film based on the life of children's author and illustrator Beatrix Potter, and combines stories from her own life with animated sequences featuring characters from her stories, such as Peter Rabbit
- Mysterious Creatures (2006) – British drama television film portraying a true story of a married couple struggling to cope with the demands of their daughter with Asperger syndrome
- The Nativity Story (2006) – Christian drama film based on the nativity of Jesus
- Not Like Everyone Else (2006) – drama television film based on a true story of events that happened to Brandi Blackbear in 1999–2000
- Nuremberg: Nazis on Trial (2006) – British biographical drama miniseries re-enacting the Nuremberg War Trials of Albert Speer, Hermann Göring, and Rudolf Hess
- O Jerusalem (2006) – French-British historical drama film about the creation of Israel, and the subsequent expulsion and flight of Palestinians
- October 1970 (2006) – Canadian disaster drama miniseries depicting the actual events surrounding the October Crisis in the Canadian province of Quebec, when members of the militant separatist group Front de libération du Québec abducted British Trade Commissioner James Cross and then Pierre Laporte, the Vice-Premier and Minister of Labour of Quebec, the latter of whom they murdered
- Ode to Joy (Japanese: バルトの楽園) (2006) – Japanese historical war drama film based on the true story of the Bandō prisoner-of-war camp in World War I
- The Old Garden (Korean: 오래된 정원) (2006) – South Korean drama film depicting the turbulent political landscape in early 1980s South Korea, and the events surrounding the Gwangju massacre
- One Night with the King (2006) – religious epic drama film portraying the Biblical story of Esther, who risked her life by approaching the King of Persia to request that he save the Jewish people
- Only the Brave (2006) – war drama film about the 100th Infantry Battalion/442nd Regimental Combat Team, a segregated World War II fighting unit primarily made up of "Nisei" Japanese Americans, which for its size and length of service became the most decorated unit in U.S. military history
- Open Water 2: Adrift (2006) – German psychological thriller horror film about a group of friends who find themselves stranded in open waters and struggle to survive, allegedly based on a true story
- Out of the Blue (2006) – New Zealand crime drama film based on the Aramoana massacre, the deadliest mass shooting in New Zealand prior to the Christchurch mosque shootings, that occurred over a period of two days in the small coastal community of Aramoana in Otago, New Zealand
- Pacquiao: The Movie (2006) – Filipino biographical action drama film based on a true story of Filipino boxer Emmanuel "Manny" Pacquiao
- The Path to 9/11 (2006) – disaster drama miniseries dramatizing the 1993 World Trade Center bombing in New York City and the events leading up to the September 11, 2001, terrorist attacks
- Peaceful Warrior (2006) – German-American drama film loosely based upon the early life of author Dan Millman
- Pinochet in Suburbia (2006) – British biographical drama television film about former Chilean dictator Augusto Pinochet and the attempts to extradite him from Great Britain during his visit there in 1998 for medical treatment
- Prairie Giant (2006) – Canadian biographical miniseries dramatizing the life and career of Tommy Douglas, the Canadian politician who oversaw the legislation of Canada's first public healthcare program as Premier of Saskatchewan
- Prince Vladimir (Russian: Кня́зь Влади́мир) (2006) – Russian historical film loosely based on the story of prince Vladimir the Great, who converted Kievan Rus' to Christianity in the late 10th century
- Provoked (2006) – British biographical drama film based on the true story of Kiranjit Ahluwalia, who unintentionally killed her abusive husband
- The Pursuit of Happyness (2006) – biographical drama film based on Chris Gardner's nearly one-year struggle with homelessness
- Pushkin: The Last Duel (Russian: Пушкин. Последняя дуэль) (2006) – Russian biographical drama film depicting the last days of the famous and popular Russian poet-Alexander Pushkin
- The Queen (2006) – British biographical drama film depicting the death of Diana, Princess of Wales in 1997 and the response of the Queen and the royal family
- Queen of Nachol (Bengali: নাছোলের রানী) (2006) – Bangladeshi historical drama film based on the early 1950s Santhal people uprising in Nachol Upazila in Chapai Nawabganj District, East Bengal and the role of social activist and reformer Ila Mitra
- Raising Jeffrey Dahmer (2006) – crime drama film based on the case of serial killer Jeffrey Dahmer
- Rampage: The Hillside Strangler Murders (2006) – crime thriller film about the Hillside Strangler murders
- Rapid Fire (2006) – Canadian action television film based on the 1980 Norco shootout
- René Lévesque (2006) – Canadian historical miniseries about the life and career of former journalist and politician René Lévesque, from 1958 to 1970
- Requiem (2006) – German biographical drama film based on the real-life events of Anneliese Michel, a German woman who was allegedly possessed by six or more demons and died in 1976
- Rescue Dawn (2006) – Luxembourgian-American epic war drama film based on the true story of German-American pilot Dieter Dengler, who was shot down and captured by villagers sympathetic to the Pathet Lao during an American military campaign in the Vietnam War
- The Ron Clark Story (2006) – biographical drama television film based on the life of educator Ron Clark
- Running with Scissors (2006) – comedy drama film based on Augusten Burroughs' 2002 memoir of the same name about his childhood
- Salvador (2006) – Spanish-British prison drama film depicting the time Salvador Puig Antich spent on death row prior to his execution by garrote in 1974, in the last rales of the Francoist dictatorship
- See No Evil: The Moors Murders (2006) – British biographical crime miniseries telling the story of the Moors murders, which were committed, between July 1963 and October 1965, by Myra Hindley and Ian Brady
- Shades of Black: The Conrad Black Story (2006) – Canadian biographical drama television film chronicling the private and public struggles of Lord Conrad Black, one of the world's most controversial press barons
- Sister Aimee: The Aimee Semple McPherson Story (2006) – biographical drama film about evangelist "Sister" Aimee Semple McPherson
- Sixty Six (2006) – British biographical comedy drama film about a bar mitzvah which takes place in London on the day of the 1966 FIFA World Cup Final, based on the true life bar mitzvah of director Paul Weiland
- Snapphanar (2006) – Swedish historical miniseries about the Snapphane peasant rebel movement that fought against the Swedish rule of Scania in the 17th century
- Sri Ramadasu (Telugu: శ్రీరామదాసు) (2006) – Indian Telugu-language biographical film based on the life of musician saint Kancharla Gopanna
- Stardust (2006) – Irish drama miniseries depicting the events surrounding the Stardust fire in Dublin on 14 February 1981, in which 48 people died
- Take the Lead (2006) – dance drama film telling the real story of dance teacher Pierre Dulaine who believed in the talent of a group of problem kids
- The Tokyo Trial (Mandarin: 東京審判) (2006) – Chinese war drama film about the International Military Tribunal for the Far East after Japan's surrender in World War II
- Traces of Love (Korean: 가을로) (2006) – South Korean romantic disaster drama film based on the Sampoong Department Store collapse, which took place in 1995
- United 93 (2006) – biographical drama thriller film chronicling the events aboard United Airlines Flight 93, one of the four hijacked flights during the September 11 attacks and the only one not to hit its intended target due to the intervention of passengers and crew
- Unnatural & Accidental (2006) – Canadian crime drama film about the disappearance of multiple Indigenous women from the Downtown Eastside of Vancouver whose deaths of extremely high blood-alcohol levels were all caused by one man, Gilbert Paul Jordan
- Walkout (2006) – biographical drama television film based on a true story of the 1968 East L.A. walkouts, also referred to as the Chicano blowouts
- The War that Made America (2006) – historical war miniseries about the French and Indian War
- Waris Shah: Ishq Daa Waaris (Punjabi: ਵਾਰਿਸ ਸ਼ਾਹ: ਇਸ਼ਕ ਦਾ ਵਾਰਿਸ) (2006) – Indian Punjabi-language biographical film about the life of legendary Punjabi poet Waris Shah during the times when he wrote the poem Heer
- We Are Marshall (2006) – biographical sport disaster drama film depicting the aftermath of the 1970 plane crash that killed 75 people: 37 players of the Marshall University Thundering Herd football team, five coaches, two athletic trainers, the athletic director, 25 boosters, and the airplane crew of five
- Why I Wore Lipstick to My Mastectomy (2006) – biographical medical drama television film depicting Geralyn Lucas's fight with breast cancer
- Wild Romance (2006) – Dutch biographical drama film about Dutch singer and artist Herman Brood
- Woh Lamhe... (Hindi: वो लम्हे...) (2006) – Indian Hindi-language romantic drama film based on Parveen Babi's life, her battle with schizophrenia and her relationship with Mahesh Bhatt to whom she was a lover as well as a mentor in his struggling days
- World Trade Center (2006) – biographical disaster drama film based on the experience of a team of New York City police officers during the September 11 attacks, in which they were trapped inside the rubble of the collapsed World Trade Center
- Zuzu Angel (2006) – Brazilian biographical drama film based on the life of fashion designer Zuzu Angel
