= WUAB =

Television station in Lorain, Ohio

- Lorain–Cleveland, Ohio; United States
- City: Lorain, Ohio
- Channels: Digital: 10 (VHF), shared with WOIO; Virtual: 43
- Branding: Cleveland's 43; 19 News

Programming
- Affiliations: 43.1: Independent with MyNetworkTV; for others, see § Subchannels

Ownership
- Owner: Gray Media; (Gray Television Licensee, LLC)
- Sister stations: WOIO, WTCL-LD, WOHZ-CD

History
- First air date: September 15, 1968
- Former channel numbers: Analog: 43 (UHF, 1968–2009); Digital: 28 (UHF, 1998–2018)
- Former affiliations: Independent (1968–1995); The WB (1995–1997); UPN (1995–2006); MyNetworkTV (2006–2018); The CW (2018–2025)
- Call sign meaning: "United Artists Broadcasting"

Technical information
- Licensing authority: FCC
- Facility ID: 8532
- ERP: 30 kW
- HAAT: 333 m (1,093 ft)
- Transmitter coordinates: 41°22′45″N 81°43′11″W
- Translator(s): 18 (UHF) Akron

Links
- Public license information: Public file; LMS
- Website: clevelands43.com

WUAB (channel 43) is an independent television station licensed to Lorain, Ohio, United States, serving the Cleveland area. WUAB is owned by Gray Media alongside CBS affiliate WOIO (channel 19), Telemundo affiliate WTCL-LD (channel 6) and WOHZ-CD (channel 22). All four stations have studios on the ground floor of the Reserve Square building in Downtown Cleveland. WUAB transmits over WOIO's full-power spectrum via a channel sharing agreement and both stations share transmitter facilities in suburban Parma.

Founded in 1968 by the United Artists film studio, from which its call sign is derived, WUAB was originally one of two ultra high frequency (UHF) independent stations to sign on in the Cleveland market, doing so eight months after Kaiser Broadcasting's WKBF-TV signed on. Prevailing over WKBF-TV in a seven-year-long battle for advertisers and audience, WUAB became one of the highest-rated UHF independent stations in the country by 1971, aided by a strong lineup of off-network reruns, feature films, sporting events, and popular local talent. Purchased by Gaylord Broadcasting in 1977, WUAB bolstered its sports presence as the over-the-air home for Cleveland Indians and Cavaliers telecasts in 1980 and established a news department in 1988, with a cable television footprint spanning multiple states.

The station was acquired by Stephen J. Cannell in 1990 but taken over by WOIO owner Malrite Communications in 1994 via a local marketing agreement, taking effect at the same time WOIO became the market's CBS affiliate and helping provide that station with a news service. A charter affiliate for both UPN and The WB from 1995 to 1997, WUAB became an exclusive UPN affiliate until the network's 2006 closure, subsequently linking up with MyNetworkTV in 2006 and The CW in 2018. Acquired outright by Malrite's successor Raycom Media in 2000, WUAB and WOIO have been in Gray Television's portfolio from 2019 onward, adding startup Telemundo affiliate WTCL-LD in 2022 and Rock Entertainment Sports Network via WOHZ-CD in 2024. The CW was dropped from WUAB in 2025 in favor of additional local news and sports programming, again supplemented with MyNetworkTV syndication.

== History ==
=== Application and construction ===
United Artists Broadcasting, owned by the film studio of the same name, was the first of three applicants to file paperwork for a new television station on channel 65 in Cleveland, having done so on March 22, 1963. The allocation was one of two designated by the Federal Communications Commission (FCC) for commercial broadcasting on the ultra high frequency (UHF) band in Cleveland proper; prior construction permits granted to radio stations WERE and WHK in 1953 were never built and revoked in 1960. United Artists had filed to construct television stations in Cleveland, Houston and Boston, but the film studio having been a defendant in a civil antitrust lawsuit related to United States v. Paramount Pictures, Inc. led the FCC to state it would reflect on "requisite qualifications" over the studio's fitness to own a television station, despite the lawsuit occurring ten years beforehand. The other two applicants for the channel were a group headed by WDBN owner Ted Niarhos and Superior Broadcasting Co., majority-controlled by area businessman Frank V. Mavec.

A comparative hearing between the applicants began in late December 1963. Early in the proceedings, United Artists requested that the FCC determine if projected operating deficits by the other two applicants lasted beyond the first year; in response, the commission requested each applicant demonstrate an ability to survive against established VHF competition over the first three years and revised their financial qualification policy. United Artists abruptly withdrew from the hearing process for the channel 65 license by amending their application to request channel 31 in Lorain, Ohio, unused after a permit for WEOL-TV held by WEOL radio failed to be built after years of delays. The Niarhos-led group concurrently withdrew their bid. A May 1965 realignment of UHF allocations saw United Artists's permit request for channel 31 moved to 43 and Superior's permit request for channel 65 moved to 61. Both companies were awarded construction permits in the spring of 1966. Superior sold their permit to a joint venture between itself and Kaiser Broadcasting, which launched WKBF-TV on January 19, 1968.

=== United Artists ownership ===
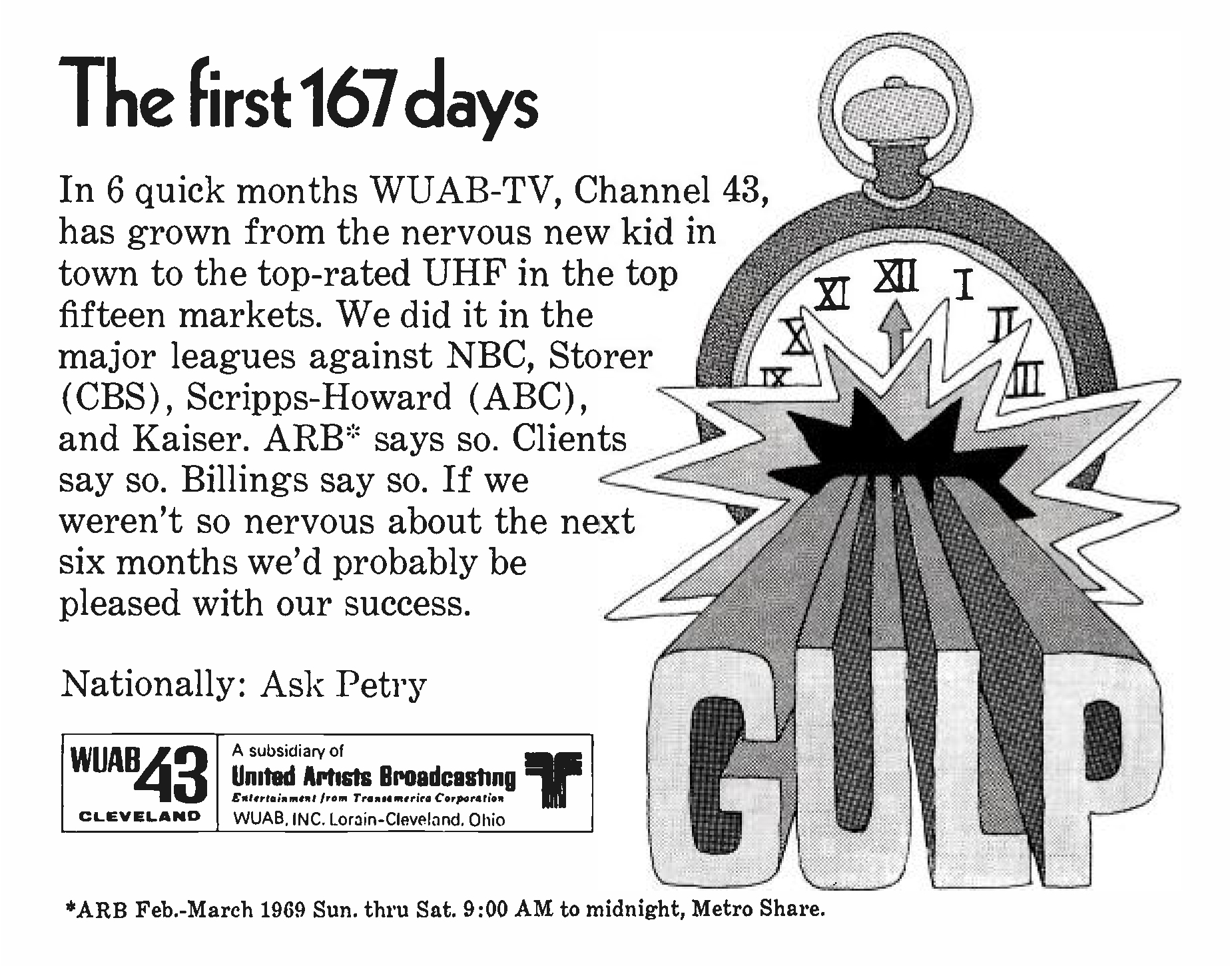
1969 industry ad taken out by WUAB noting their immediate ratings success "against NBC, Storer... Scripps-Howard... and Kaiser."

WUAB was signed on by United Artists on September 15, 1968, following WKBF-TV as the second commercial UHF station in Cleveland proper and the fifth full-power UHF station in the market. WUAB used the WKBF-TV transmitter tower in Parma; the installation of the WUAB antenna on the tower several days prior forced WKBF-TV to be off the air for an extended period of time. As their studio facility near Parmatown Mall was still under construction, WUAB operated out of a semi-trailer next to an adjacent Parma bowling alley, with some studios inside the alley's nursery. Marty Sullivan, one of the station's first announcers, later recalled how a restroom adjacent to the main announcer booth had a warning sign, "Do not use Bippy when announcer is in booth". WVIZ's Brook Park studios were also used by WUAB. WUAB's lack of any physical assets in Lorain proper and film studio ownership was met with criticism by the Lorain Journal editorial board, which asked, "Why call it a Lorain station? Why give Lorain's TV franchise to outsiders who want to operate outside of Lorain? Why not give Lorain people an opportunity to operate a TV station in Lorain, to serve Lorain?"

The less-than-optimal working arrangement while permanent studios were being constructed severely limited WUAB's local output; by comparison, WKBF-TV boasted an array of local programming and launched a news service. The combined Cleveland–Akron–Canton television market was ranked in 1968 as the eighth-largest in the United States, with the industry taking notice over the two competing UHF stations with well-financed ownership and substantial investment. Befitting its ownership by a film studio, WUAB placed an emphasis on feature films with a prime time showcase dubbed the UA Star Movie. Even with the existing limitations facing the station, WUAB successfully claimed a significant portion of WKBF-TV's audience by the spring of 1969. The Plain Dealer critic William Hinckley retrospectively noted WUAB almost immediately entered the marketplace with better overall programming than WKBF-TV, promptly dividing the available audience.

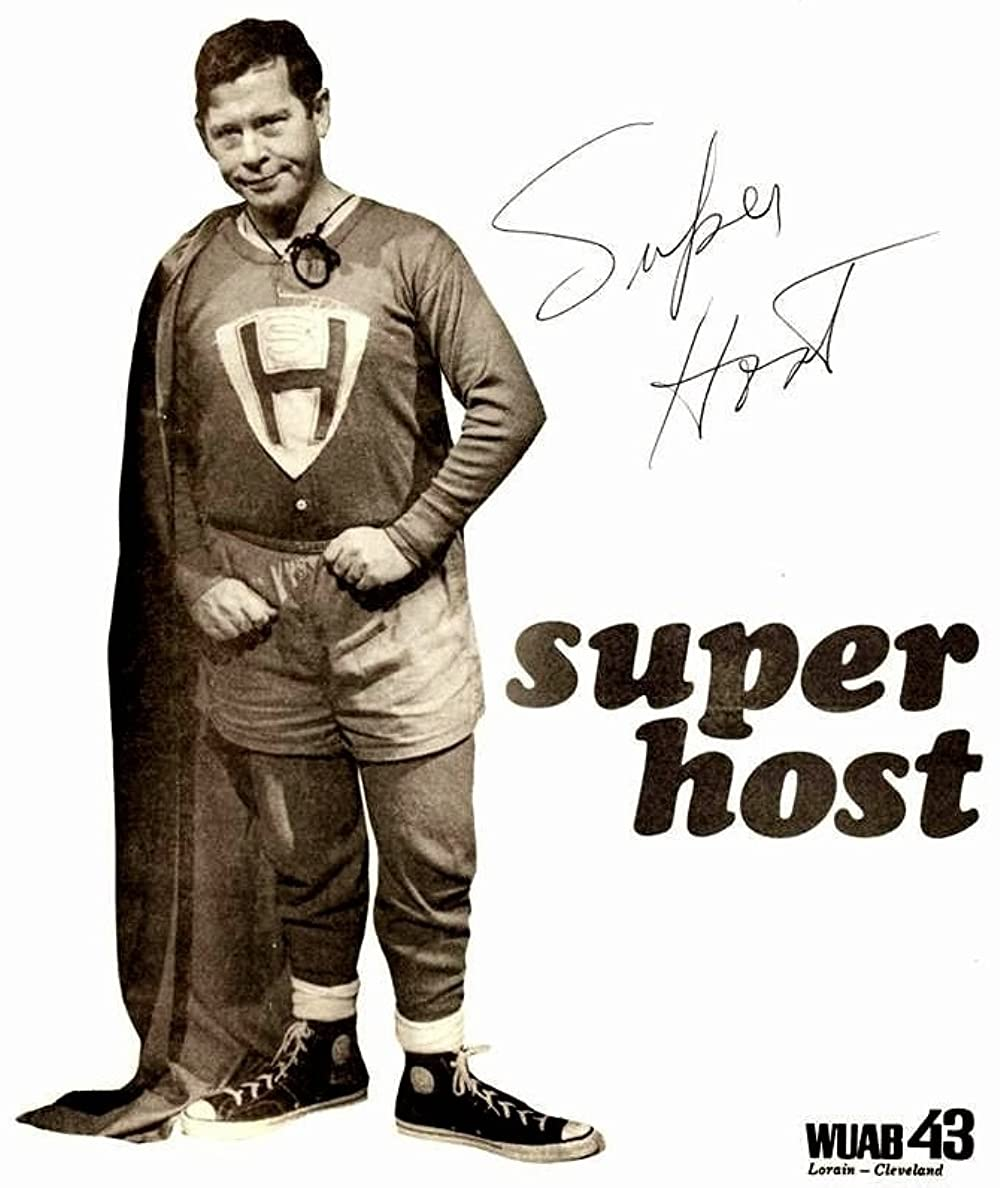
Marty Sullivan as Superhost.

WUAB's studios were completed in June 1969, with the next few months proving to be a turning point. Linn Sheldon, who joined WKBF-TV to host an afternoon movie in August 1968, left that station to join WUAB on December 1, 1969, reviving the acclaimed children's show "Barnaby" which he originated at KYW-TV. Several weeks earlier, a Saturday afternoon science fiction film showcase Mad Theatre launched, hosted by Sullivan under the Superhost persona. Sullivan created the character accidentally during rehearsals for a performance by The Four Lads when the audience reacted positively to his facial contortions; he then adopted a nasal vocalization to distinguish from his announcer voice. Another staff announcer, Jack Reynolds, began emceeing professional wrestling tapings at the station in 1969. Alice Weston, recognized as the first female television host in Cleveland, became the station's public affairs director and a talk show host. An emphasis was also placed on sports, as WUAB carried Ohio State Buckeyes football and men's basketball, Notre Dame Fighting Irish football and Cleveland Barons broadcasts. A daily early-afternoon movie showcase, the Prize Movie, launched with Reynolds as host, with WGAR personality John Lanigan taking over in 1975.

At the same time WUAB's fortunes rose, Kaiser Broadcasting began instituting cutbacks at both WKBF-TV and their station group, including the groupwide elimination of local newscasts on November 12, 1970. All but one of Kaiser's stations failed to turn a profit after three years of investment, raising industry concerns over the viability of UHF stations. WUAB, however, became not only the Cleveland market's leading UHF independent by 1971, but the second-highest rated UHF station in the country behind Boston's WSBK-TV. Cleveland Cavaliers and Cleveland Crusaders telecasts were added in 1972, but WUAB declined to renew the Cavaliers contract in 1975 over increasing costs.

That show was like an early cable station. It went all over the place ... Canada, New York and Pennsylvania. People like Arnold Schwarzenegger and Don Rickles came on the show. I was walking around in Moscow once and somebody from across the street yelled "What's the Prize Movie today?"

— John Lanigan

Kaiser announced a pending shutdown of WKBF-TV on April 8, 1975, after agreeing to sell WKBF's technical and programming assets to United Artists in exchange for a 36 percent equity stake in WUAB. WKBF-TV operated at a loss throughout the station's entire existence of 7 years and 96 days, with Kaiser officials admitting the market could not support more than one UHF independent. In the days prior to the announcement, both WUAB and WKBF-TV management acknowledged negotiations over an asset disposition had been ongoing for "a couple of years". During a farewell on-air statement, WKBF-TV general manager Alan B. Bennett stated that the sign-on of WUAB impeded consumer demand, in turn placing Kaiser in financial jeopardy, "... and that only one successful (station) must merge." WUAB not only acquired the rights to much of WKBF-TV's programming, but replaced the station in several cable systems outside of the market, including Zanesville and Dover/New Philadelphia.

The WKBF-TV asset sale came at the same time as a possible dial position move for WUAB. After a construction permit for channel 19, in place since 1968, was sold to Joseph T. Zingale—a former co-owner of WIXY and with ownership interests in multiple area professional sports teams—United Artists protested the sale. Despite meeting FCC approval, Zingale rescinded the purchase in early 1974 due to a pricing dispute. United Artists then offered to purchase the permit in January 1975 with the intent of moving WUAB to channel 19, but Zingale filed a protest against the sale after renewed interest in it. An FCC review board revoked the channel 19 permit in April 1976 after declining to extend the construction deadline.

=== Gaylord Broadcasting years ===
Citing a decision to leave broadcasting, United Artists sold WUAB to the Gaylord Broadcasting Company for $10.5 million (equivalent to $59.4 million in 2025) in September 1976; Kaiser, itself in the process of being sold to minority owner Field Communications, divested their equity stake in the station. Under Gaylord, WUAB continued its expansion into cable television; when the station signed a three-year contract on October 20, 1979, for Cleveland Indians broadcasts, its cable footprint reached five states and one million homes. Bruce Drennan and Joe Tait were hired to announce WUAB's Indians telecasts and called Len Barker's perfect game on May 15, 1981. WUAB then reacquired the local rights to Cleveland Cavaliers broadcasts from WJKW-TV effective with the 1980–81 season, helping to establish a year-round sports presence.

While WKBF-TV's closure raised doubts about the possibility of a second UHF independent in the market, the imminent maturity of subscription television (STV) technology led a consortium of four Chicago-area companies to sign on WCLQ-TV (channel 61) on March 3, 1981. WCLQ-TV operated at first as a hybrid independent and area affiliate for Preview, but Preview's demise in 1983 forced WCLQ-TV to operate as a full-time independent. A subsequent ownership change at WCLQ-TV resulted in that station aggressively purchasing syndication rights to multiple programs, in turn driving up costs for programs on WUAB in what was later termed "the indie boom". Despite WCLQ-TV's aggressiveness, WUAB maintained a position in 1985 as the top-rated independent station in town, buoyed largely by Indians and Cavaliers broadcasts, an extensive film library and well-established local programs. At the same time, WOIO (channel 19) launched on May 19, 1985, owned by a group with Malrite Communications as one of the investors, while WBNX-TV (channel 55) was signed on by the ministry of televangelist Ernest Angley.

The competition doesn't bother me, I feel good about it. The adrenalin [sic] is flowing. Look, it either brings out the best in you or you get out of the business.

— Michael A. Schuch, WUAB general manager

The added competition ultimately drove down ratings and advertising rates for all four independent stations, in particular WOIO and WUAB. WUAB purchased Webster reruns and continued to pay for the show's rights into 1990 despite having removed the program from its schedule years earlier. While WOIO immediately made an impact in the local ratings, the station was sold outright to Malrite for an infusion of capital. Finding next to no return on investment for their aggressive programming purchases and little possibility of profitability, WCLQ-TV was sold outright to Silver King Broadcasting to carry HSN programming as WQHS, with that station's outgoing ownership ultimately sued into bankruptcy. WOIO concurrently partnered with the Fox Broadcasting Company after Gaylord declined to affiliate any of their stations, including WUAB, with the nascent network. Another coup for WOIO came with a long-term contract for Cavaliers games in 1988, replacing WUAB.

=== Cannell ownership and lease to Malrite ===
If anybody calls, tell 'em Barnaby said hello. And tell them I think that you are the nicest person in the whole world. Just you.

— Linn Sheldon, customary ending to each "Barnaby" episode

Two of WUAB's local stalwarts ended their shows at the start of 1990, within weeks of each other. Superhost's final episode aired on January 20, 1990, following a period of declining ratings, with Marty Sullivan continuing as a booth announcer. On January 30, Linn Sheldon announced his retirement after a 41-year career in television, with "Barnaby" concluding its run on March 30; Sheldon's departure was seen as the end to one of the last remaining links to the "Golden Era" for locally produced children's television. The week before Sheldon's final "Barnaby" show, Gaylord announced the sale of WUAB to Cannell Communications, headed by television producer Stephen J. Cannell and former WUAB general manager William Schwartz, for $60 million (equivalent to $148 million in 2025). While Cannell became famous for creating multiple television series during the 1980s, his purchase of WUAB occurred during a downturn for his production company, with only two programs in active production. The changes at WUAB were not limited to the station itself: the FCC's passage of syndication exclusivity regulations began affecting the station's cable footprint, with Columbus cable systems acknowledging WUAB was a "trouble spot" for likely blackouts.

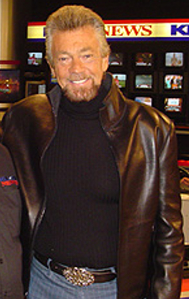
Stephen J. Cannell

Despite the departures of Sheldon and "Superhost" and the sale of the station, WUAB continued aggressively competing against WOIO, with newly appointed general manager Brooke Spectorsky calling WUAB "a sleeping giant... that has been throttled back by previous owners". In 1988, the station launched Kidsland for the station's children's programming, hiring Liz Hermann as a continuity host in February 1990. WUAB began carrying The Disney Afternoon program block in the fall of 1990 as Kidsland's centerpiece. Kidsland was established at the same time that WOIO set up a similar kids' club, but WOIO ultimately folded their club into Fox Kids and declined to hire an in-studio host. The station also picked up local rights to the Prime Time Entertainment Network in 1993 and the Action Pack syndication block in 1994. As a nod to Cannell's ownership, WUAB acquired reruns to 21 Jump Street in 1990, displacing Hee Haw, which WUAB carried throughout the entirety of Gaylord ownership. WUAB lead news anchor Romona Robinson also made a cameo appearance as a news reporter on The Commish, a series Cannell co-created and produced.

On May 23, 1994, WJW-TV owner New World Communications signed a group-wide affiliation deal with Fox, initiating a wide-ranging realignment of U.S. television network affiliations. After initially courting WEWS-TV owner Scripps-Howard, CBS signed up WOIO as their replacement affiliate in Cleveland despite WOIO not having a news department. Two months before the New World-Fox pact was announced, Malrite and Cannell began talks over a local marketing agreement (LMA) between WOIO and WUAB, with Malrite assuming operational control of WUAB; the U.S. Department of Justice announced the planned LMA prior to CBS executives meeting with WUAB. The LMA took effect on August 18, 1994, 16 days before WOIO's affiliation switch to CBS. Malrite announced plans for new studios at Reserve Square in Downtown Cleveland and newscasts for WOIO to be produced by WUAB. Much of WOIO's syndicated programming and Cavaliers broadcasts were also transferred to WUAB.

The changes also resulted in the permanent cancellation of the Prize Movie, which WUAB revived earlier in 1994 after cancelling it in September 1993 to accommodate several new talk shows on the schedule. Outside of a period from 1984 to 1985 when Dave "Fig" Newton hosted, John Lanigan had been the program's host for 18 years.

=== Affiliations with UPN and The WB ===
WUAB committed to become a charter affiliate of the United Paramount Network (UPN)—a joint venture between Chris-Craft's United Television division and Paramount Pictures—in November 1993, over a year before the network launched on January 16, 1995. Several days earlier, on January 6, 1995, WUAB signed up as a charter affiliate of The WB, a venture between Time Warner and Tribune Broadcasting. WUAB made the addition due to both networks launching with limited schedules: UPN on Monday and Tuesday nights and Saturday afternoons and The WB on Wednesday evenings. Both networks committed to expanding their schedules for the 1995–96 television season to include an additional night along with children's program blocks (UPN Kids and Kids' WB), while UPN took priority on WUAB with WB shows airing at other times.

When WUAB started with the Indians in 1980, the Eagles had a hit record titled 'The Long Run.' That's how we feel about this: we're in for the long run.

— John Chaffee, president of WUAB operator Malrite Communications

The 1995 Cleveland Indians season, one of the most successful in team history, saw WUAB's viewership jump to a 27 audience share for their game coverage, a substantial increase from the station's 7 share during the 1992 season. WUAB signed a new multi-year contract afterwards which included up to 70 Indians telecasts in 1996, further resulting in shows from both networks airing out of pattern. After The WB announced a third night of prime time on Sundays beginning in the fall of 1996, WUAB management suggested WB could become "a weekend network". Increasingly unable to accommodate programming from both networks and Indians and Cavaliers telecasts, WUAB dropped The WB, with WBNX-TV taking the affiliation on September 1, 1997.

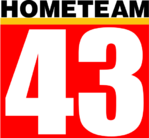
"Hometeam 43" logo, 1999–2002.

Montgomery, Alabama–based Raycom Media purchased Malrite Communications on April 6, 1998, for an undisclosed price; the LMA with WUAB was included in the deal. The sale was finalized six months later on September 17. Under Raycom ownership, WUAB and WOIO began identifying as "Hometeam 19" and "Hometeam 43" for both newscasts and entertainment programming. On March 11, 2000, after the FCC relaxed rules allowing common ownership of two commercially licensed television stations in the same market, Raycom acquired WUAB outright. Raycom struggled to turn a profit with WOIO and WUAB and admitted to overpaying for them during collective bargaining agreement negotiations for unionized behind-the-scenes personnel in 2000, exacerbated by WOIO's newscasts failing to find viewership amid continuous on-air and management turnover.

WUAB's UPN43 logo, used from 2002 to 2006.

The biggest change for WUAB came on October 18, 2001, when the Cleveland Indians signed an exclusive cable-only deal with Fox Sports Ohio for the 2002 season, removing over-the-air telecasts entirely. Bill Applegate, who became general manager for the two stations earlier in the year, publicly hinted at such a deal weeks beforehand as a way for the Indians to increase revenue in a way WUAB could not provide. In a bid to revamp the station's image without the Indians games, WUAB rebranded as "43 The Block" on March 4, 2002, with locally produced comedy skits in between the early-evening lineup. After a casting call, the station selected four "regular Joe" comics that included future How to Boil Water host Jack Hourigan. Mike Polk, a member of the station's promotions department, began contributing to "The Block" segments with his Last Call Cleveland troupe.

=== MyNetworkTV affiliation ===
WUAB logo as "CLE 43", 2015–2018.

On January 24, 2006, UPN parent CBS Corporation (formed after a split of the original Viacom) and Time Warner's Warner Bros. Entertainment division announced the shutdown of UPN and The WB, with some programming moved to a newly created network, The CW. WBNX-TV signed up as one of The CW's first outside charter affiliates not owned by either CBS or Tribune Broadcasting. To serve former affiliates of either network not selected for The CW—namely its own—News Corporation announced the creation of MyNetworkTV on February 22, 2006. WUAB affiliated with MyNetworkTV on March 7, 2006, along with other Raycom stations in Honolulu and Baton Rouge. WUAB's Cavaliers game coverage was reduced in 2006 to several regular season and postseason games in simulcast with Fox Sports Ohio; this arrangement ran through the 2018–2019 season.

WUAB was renamed "CLE 43" on August 24, 2015, as part of a wide-ranging rebranding effort at both it and WOIO, which concurrently adopted the "Cleveland 19" name. The rebranding was done to abandon Raycom's prior "tabloid" reputation with 19 Action News in the Cleveland market.

=== Sale to Gray Television and CW affiliation ===
Raycom agreed to merge their stations, including WOIO and WUAB, with Atlanta-based Gray Television on June 25, 2018, in a cash-and-stock merger transaction valued at $3.6 billion (equivalent to $4.62 billion in 2025). The sale was completed on January 2, 2019. Shortly after the merger announcement, on July 11, 2018, WUAB signed a long-term affiliation contract with The CW, replacing WBNX-TV. The new WUAB contract took effect on July 16 and occurred several months after a foreclosure process was initiated on WBNX-TV parent Winston Broadcasting Network from Ernest Angley's ministry, putting the future of that station in doubt. At the same time, the affiliation switch displaced MyNetworkTV, which was moved to overnights on WOIO's second digital subchannel.

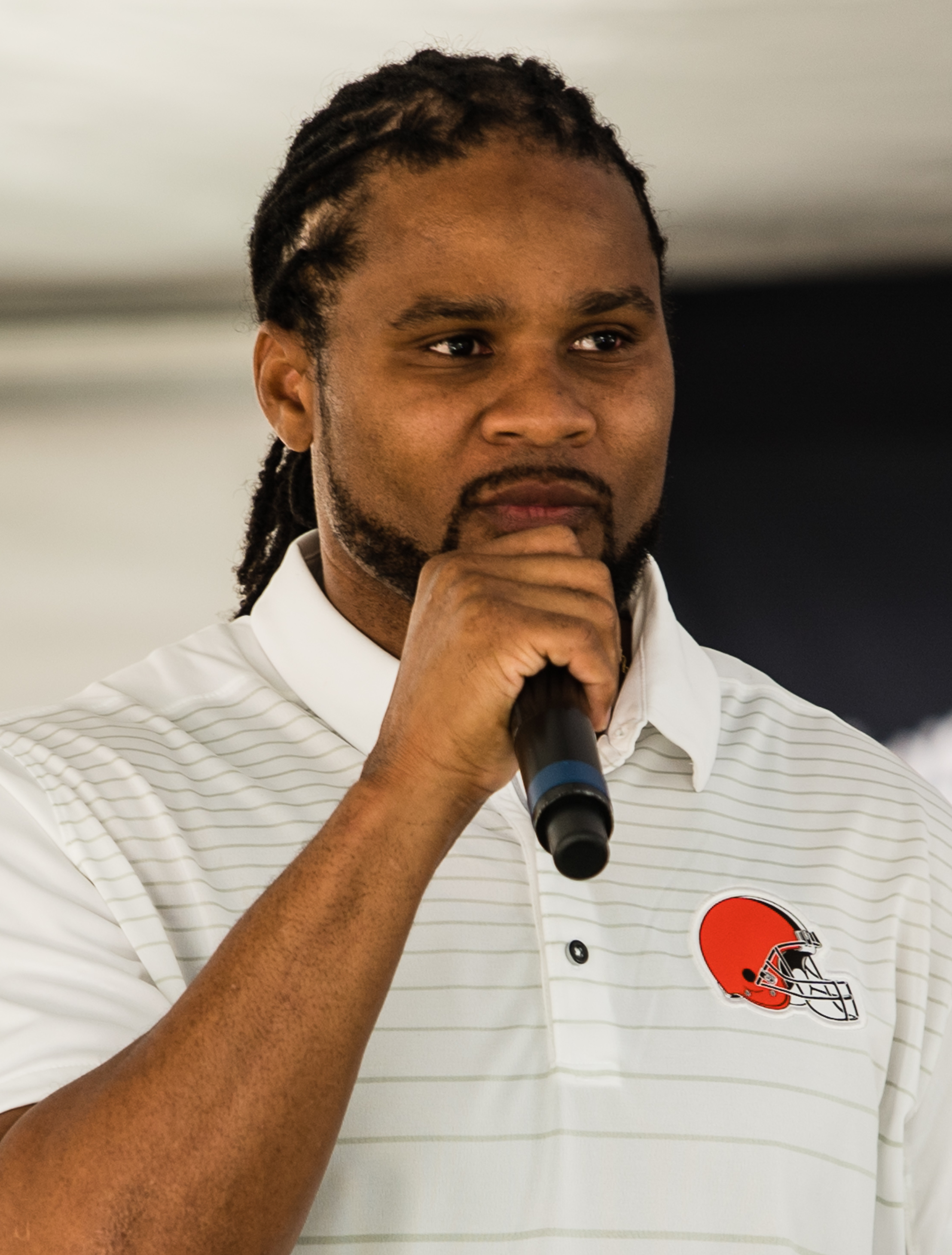
Josh Cribbs

Under Gray ownership, WUAB has increased production of local programming. Beginning on September 9, 2019, the station began carrying same-day repeats of Cribbs in the CLE: Josh and Maria Live, a WOIO lifestyle talk show hosted by former Cleveland Brown Josh Cribbs and wife Maria Cribbs. WUAB added a locally produced B-movie showcase, The Big Bad B-Movie Show, on October 17, 2020. Created as a stopgap in the wake of the COVID-19 pandemic, Big Bad B-Movie also became the first locally produced entertainment program on the station in 30 years. Explaining how the show was greenlit, general manager Erik Schrader told The New York Times, "We asked ourselves, do we show repeats or something creative?" After The CW expanded to Saturday night programming, Big Bad B-Movie was moved to Saturday late nights where it aired until it was cancelled in late 2022.

During the onset of the COVID-19 pandemic, WUAB partnered with the Cleveland Metropolitan School District (CMSD) to provide an hour of airtime on weekdays for in-school instructional programming, beginning on April 20, 2020. As part of the arrangement, WUAB also telecast all high school graduations in the district throughout June 2020, which were conducted virtually. CMSD on CW43 ended at the start of the 2022–2023 school year, concurrent with the CMSD relaxing most COVID-19 health protocols and fully resuming normal operations.

Nexstar Media Group, owner of WJW, announced its purchase of WBNX-TV in late October 2024, and WBNX reclaimed the market's CW affiliation on September 1, 2025. Gray Television concurrently announced WUAB's relaunch as a sports-oriented independent, including play-by-play from the Rock Entertainment Sports Network (RESN), with MyNetworkTV programming as filler in prime time. Branded "Cleveland's 43", WUAB was removed from several video on demand platforms with the switch, including Hulu. WUAB carried five Cavaliers regular season games during the second half of the 2023–2024 season by arrangement with FanDuel Sports Network Ohio, (Note: FanDuel Sports Network Ohio was known as Fox Sports Ohio from 1998 until 2021, and as Bally Sports Ohio from 2021 until 2024.) repeated for the 2024–2025 season as a combined simulcast with RESN and FanDuel.

== Programming ==
=== Sports programming ===
WUAB currently features play-by-play coverage and other ancillary programming from the Cleveland Cavaliers, Cleveland Monsters, the Cleveland Charge, Columbus Blue Jackets and St. Edward high school football. Game coverage for the Cavaliers, Monsters, Charge and St. Edward is simulcast with Rock Entertainment Sports Network, while the Cavaliers and Blue Jackets were also simulcast on FanDuel Sports Network Ohio.

The station was the over-the-air home for Cleveland Indians baseball from 1980 to 2001. From its launch into the 1980s, WUAB featured Ohio State Buckeyes football and basketball, along with Notre Dame Fighting Irish football. Channel 43 has carried select hockey games from the first AHL Cleveland Barons, the Cleveland Crusaders, the NHL Cleveland Barons, the Cleveland Lumberjacks and Monsters. Additionally, the station has telecast Cleveland Gladiators arena football and Cleveland Force indoor soccer. Throughout the 2010s, it served as an affiliate for the Raycom Sports–operated ACC Network which returned to the station in 2023 via CW Sports.

In 2018, WUAB carried Cleveland State Vikings men's basketball games.

=== Newscasts ===
Prior to 1988, WUAB staff announcers presented brief news bulletins during program junctions; one of the announcers, Marty Sullivan, famously read bulletins in-between "Superhost" tapings by wearing a suitcoat on top of his Superhost costume. WUAB committed to establishing a news department in June 1987 with the hiring of Daniel Acklen as news director and intentions to launch a 10 p.m. newscast by January 1988, the first attempt in the Cleveland market since WKBF-TV's attempt failed in 1970. While the rest of the staff were relative newcomers to Cleveland television—including Romona Robinson, Bob Hetherington and Frank Cariello—Gib Shanley was hired as sports director, fulfilling Acklen's hope of luring an established market personality to the station. Existing talent at WUAB, including Indians announcer Jack Corrigan and Prize Movie host John Lanigan, became contributors to the newscast.

The debut broadcast of The Ten O'Clock News on January 4, 1988, was marred by technical problems, but WUAB's ratings for that evening doubled compared to the previous Monday. By the fall of 1988, Akron Beacon Journal television critic Bob Dyer credited multiple on- and off-air improvements made to the newscast but noted Shanley's veteran presence and 15-minute long sportscasts nearly overshadowed everyone else. WUAB launched a weekend version of The Ten O'Clock News by September 1989, and by 1990, the station's $2 million investment (equivalent to $4.93 million in 2025) into the news department was fully recouped. Hetherington was replaced as lead anchor by Jack Marschall in the summer of 1990, with ratings for the newscast repeatedly surpassing expectations.

WUAB began producing two daily newscasts for WOIO on February 6, 1995, at 6 p.m. and 11 p.m. along with their existing 10 p.m. newscast under the umbrella brand Cleveland Television News. WOIO's newscasts originated within the joint newsroom in a style derived heavily from CITY-TV's CityPulse, while WUAB's newscasts came from a separate, more traditional set, both originating from Reserve Square in Downtown Cleveland. Marschall, Robinson, and Shanley were the only three on-air staffers to work exclusively for WUAB. Beginning in March 1996, WOIO and WUAB's newscasts were rebroadcast on an hour tape-delay over Akron station WAOH-LP (channel 29) and its Cleveland simulcast following the dissolution of WAKC-TV's news department. Gib Shanley left the station at the end of 1996, with Jeff Phelps as his replacement. Robinson left in February 1997 to join WKYC, with Cynthia Tinsley taking over as 10 p.m. co-anchor. Kimberly Godwin-Webb, who in 2021 became the first Black female president of ABC News, served as news director for both stations from 1996 to 1998.

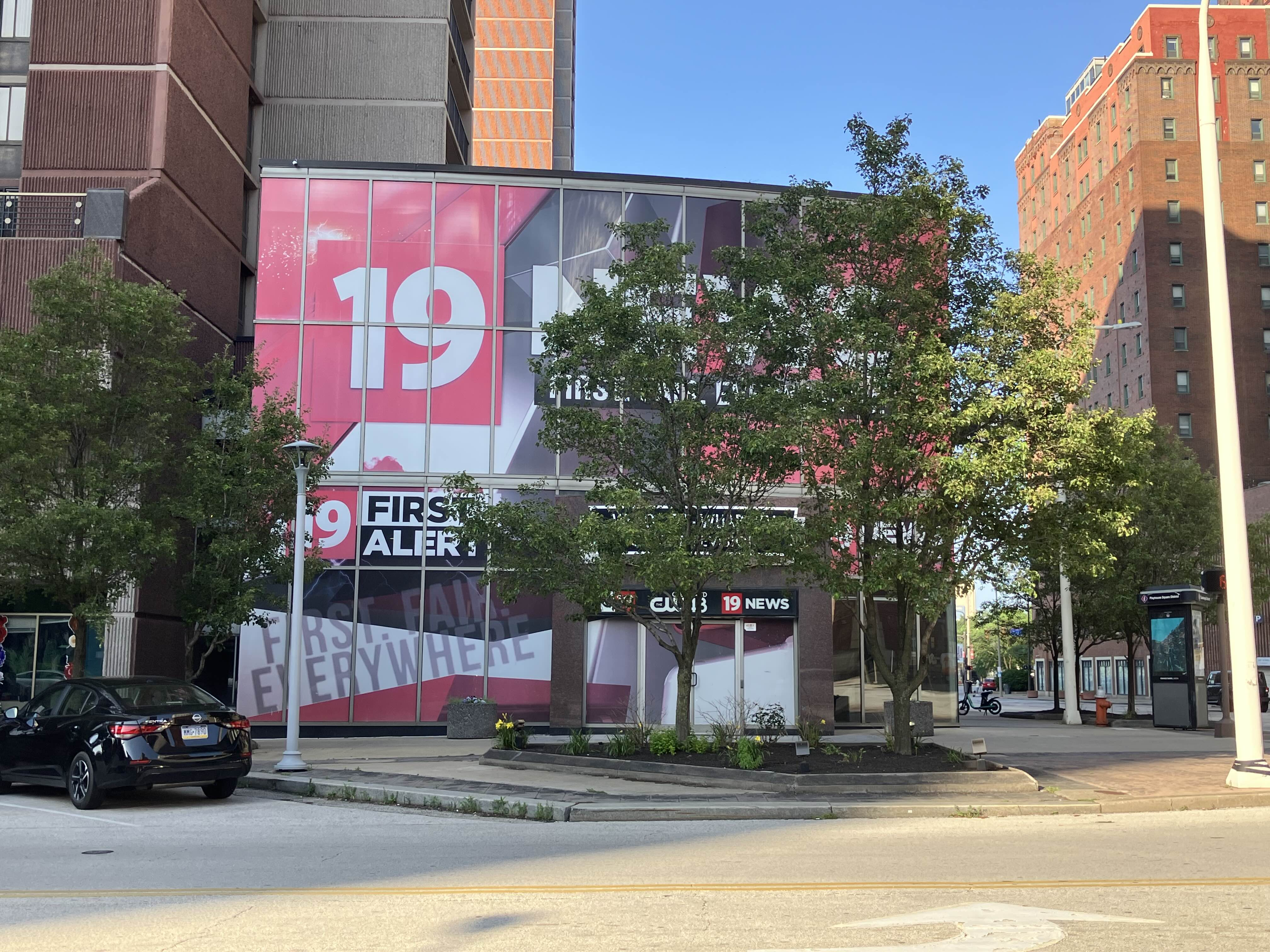
WOIO, WUAB and WTCL-LD's studios at Reserve Square in Downtown Cleveland.

During this period, WUAB's 10 p.m. newscast began trailing WJW's newscast in the ratings, with the spring 1998 sweeps period showing WJW beating WUAB by a 2–1 margin despite the popularity of Marschall and Tinsley; this was attributed partly to UPN prime time programming providing a weaker than expected lead-in audience, as well as WOIO's news department assuming top priority. WUAB added an 11:30 a.m. newscast in October 1997, both as a complement to WOIO's established noon newscast and to help establish an autonomous identity for WUAB, but this was cancelled in December 1998 due to low ratings. By 1999, newscasts were branded Hometeam 19 News and Hometeam 43 News, based on WUAB's "Cleveland's Home Team" slogan, with Marschall assuming lead anchor duties at WOIO. WUAB began simulcasting WOIO's noon news in 2002, with all "19" branding remaining intact.

Newscasts on WOIO and WUAB have used the same branding since May 2002, when all newscasts were renamed Action News, later amended to 19 Action News. As part of an overall rebrand to Cleveland 19 News in 2015, WUAB's 10 p.m. newscast was moved to a 90-minute block at 9 p.m., in turn moving MyNetworkTV programming into late evenings. After affiliating with The CW, the 9 p.m. newscast was moved back to a full hour at 10 p.m. and a 7 a.m. newscast, in place since 2011, was discontinued. Newscasts at 7 p.m. and 11 a.m. have since been added at WUAB along with a full reinstatement of the 7 a.m. newscast in June 2022. The 9 p.m. news was reinstated in September 2025 concurrent with WUAB switching back to MyNetworkTV.

Since 2019, all newscasts produced for WOIO and WUAB have used the 19 News branding.

=== Notable former on-air staff ===
- Harry Boomer, senior reporter and host of 43 Focus
- Gretchen Carlson, news anchor
- Jack Corrigan, Indians play-by-play, 1985–2001
- Bob Golic, co-host of Tailgate 19
- Mike Hegan, Indians color analyst, 1989–2001
- Carl Monday, investigative reporter
- Reggie Rucker, Indians color analyst, 1982–1984
- Chris Van Vliet, entertainment reporter

== Technical information ==
=== Subchannels ===
WOIO and WUAB share a channel and are broadcast from transmitter facilities in Parma.

Subchannels of WOIO and WUAB
License	Subchannel	Res.	Short name	Programming
WOIO	19.1	1080i	WOIO-HD	CBS
WOIO	19.2	480i	MeTV	MeTV
WOIO	19.3	480i	Defy	Defy
WOIO	19.4	480i	The365	365BLK
WUAB	43.1	720p	WUAB	Main WUAB programming
WUAB	43.2	480i	Outlaw	Outlaw
WUAB	43.3	480i	Oxygen	Oxygen

=== Analog-to-digital conversion ===
WUAB ended regular programming on its analog signal, over UHF channel 43, on June 12, 2009, as part of the federally mandated transition from analog to digital television. The station's digital signal continued to broadcast on its pre-transition UHF channel 28, using virtual channel 43.

On February 17, 2017, it was revealed that WUAB's over-the-air spectrum had been sold in the FCC's spectrum reallocation auction for an undisclosed amount; WUAB remained in operation, sharing broadcast spectrum with WOIO using their transmitter at the West Creek Reservation in Parma. WUAB was the only station owned by Raycom to participate in the spectrum auction. The shared broadcast with WOIO took effect on January 8, 2018, at 2:01 a.m. Both stations returned to WUAB's former tower in Parma in July 2024 with the installation of a new antenna.

=== Translator ===
WUAB operates a digital fill-in translator in Akron on UHF channel 18, serving that section of the Cleveland–Akron–Canton market; this translator was launched for WOIO on August 12, 2011.

Grade A signal contours for WUAB and associated translator.; WUAB 43.1; WOIO (DRT) 43.1
