= Thénault =

Thénault, Thenault is a French surname. Notable people with the surname include:

- Georges Thenault (1887–1948), French commander of the Lafayette Escadrille
- Marion Thénault (born 2000), Canadian freestyle skier
