= Bank Error in Your Favour =

- Directed by: Gérard Bitton; Michel Munz
- Starring: Gérard Lanvin; Jean-Pierre Darroussin
- Release date: 8 April 2009 (France)
- Running time: 1h 45min
- Country: France
- Language: French

Bank Error in Your Favour (French: Erreur de la banque en votre faveur) is a 2009 French comedy film directed by Gérard Bitton and Michel Munz.

== Cast ==
- Gérard Lanvin - Julien Foucault
- Jean-Pierre Darroussin - Étienne
- Barbara Schulz - Stéphanie
- Philippe Magnan - Baudoin
- Scali Delpeyrat - Gilbert
- Jennifer Decker - Harmony
- Éric Berger - Alban
- Éric Naggar - Du Rouvre
- Roger Van Hool - Bergstein
- Jean-Yves Chatelais - Martinez
- Roger Dumas - Lebrun
- Laurent Gamelon - Georges
- Marie-Christine Adam - Mme Brière
- Martin Lamotte - Antoine
