= Georges Thenault =

Commander of Lafayette Escadrille

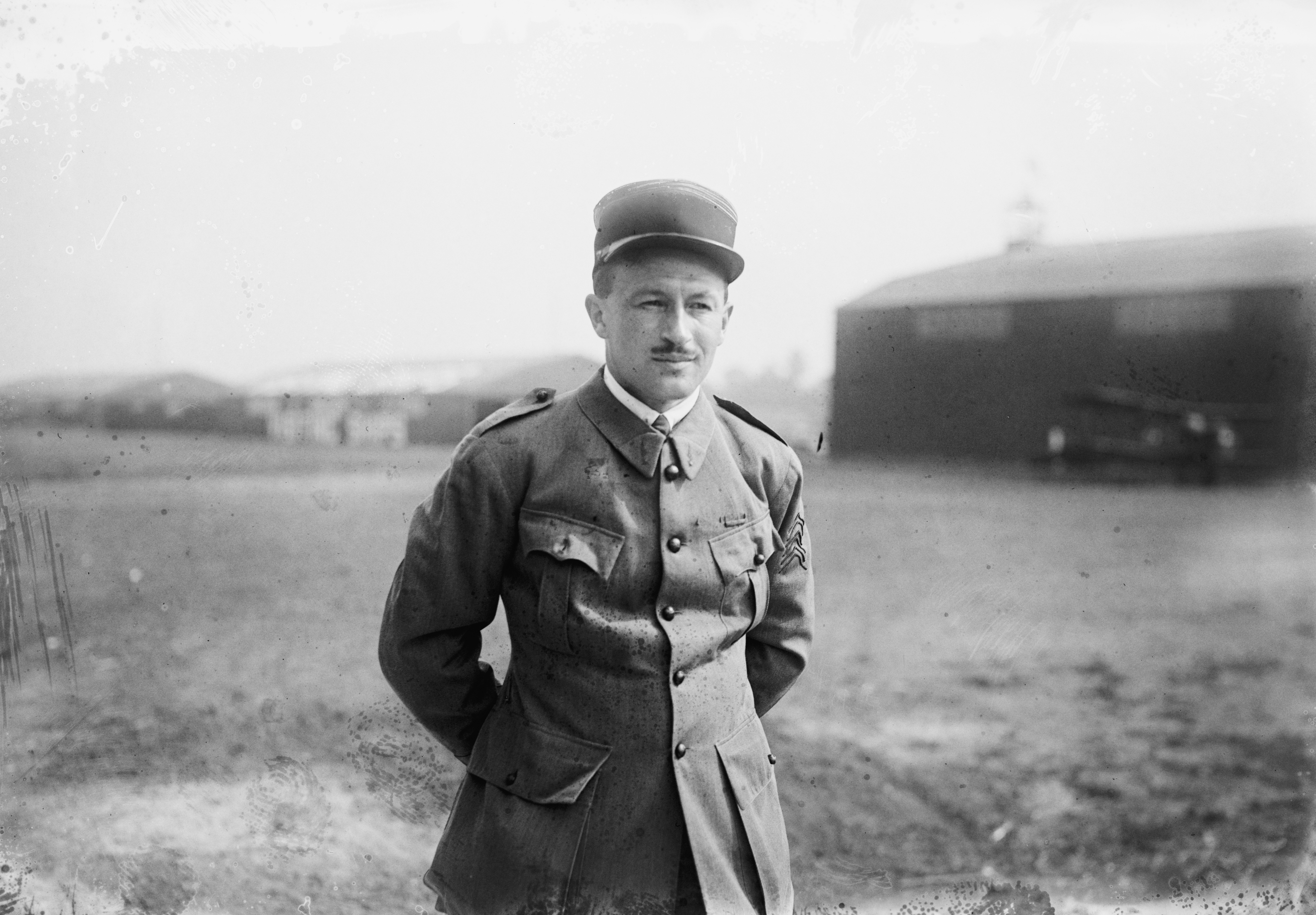
- Captain Georges Thenault, French Aviation Service, at Langley Field, Virginia, 4 October 1922
- Born: 15 December 1887; Celle-Lévescault, France
- Died: 19 December 1948 (aged 61); Paris, France
- Burial place: Crypt of the Lafayette Escadrille Memorial in the park of Ville-neuve L'etang, between the suburbs of Garches and Marne la Coquette
- Military career
- Allegiance: France
- Branch: French Aviation Service
- Service years: August 1914–1937
- Rank: Lieutenant Colonel
- Unit: Escadrille C.11; Escadrille C.34;
- Commands: Escadrille C.42, détachement de l'armée de Lorraine (D.A.L.), as commanding officer; Lafayette Escadrille N.124, as commanding officer
- Awards: Légion d'honneur, Croix de guerre, with four Palms

Lieutenant Colonel (Note: Air force officer ranks) Georges Thenault (French pronunciation: [ʒɔʁʒ təno]) (15 December 1887 – 19 December 1948) was the commander of the Lafayette Escadrille – the famed branch of the French air force in World War I composed of American volunteer pilots. The Lafayette Escadrille was created before the United States gave up its neutrality and joined France and Britain in the war against Germany. Once the United States formally entered the war, the Lafayette Escadrille was absorbed into the U.S. Army.

== Early life ==
Born on 2 October 1887, in the small town of Celle-Lévescault, France (located on main highway between La Rochelle and Tours) to the parents of Monsieur Paul Louis Thenault and Madame Eugénie Gabrielle Louise Bathilde (Bonneau) Thenault. His parents were married on 1 September 1886 at Église Notre-Dame de Vaux Church, Vaux commune, Vienne, Poitou-Charentes, France. His siblings were Louis Roger Thenault (brother), Edmée Isabelle Thenault (sister), and Marcel Emile Thenault (brother).

== World War I ==
Standing 5-ft, 8-in, he was a giant in the eyes of his fellow Frenchmen and a respected leader amongst the American volunteer pilots. Identified as N.124, the Lafayette Escadrille was assigned to Groupe de Combat 13 under the overall command of Commandant Philippe Féquant. During 1916–1917, this Groupe de Combat 13 took part in such engagements as the Battle of the Somme, the Second Battle of the Aisne, the Battle of Verdun, and in the Battle of Passchendaele. In early 1918, it operated in the region between Soissons and Reims.

Captain Georges Thenault, French Aviation Service, circa 1918

Captain Georges Thenault credits Adjudant Norman Prince for conceiving in November 1914 the idea of bringing together his countrymen with some of those of the French Foreign Legion in a squadron of flyers. Support soon came about from civilian and military representatives of France and the United States. These representatives added expertise and government networking resolving over time the method of recruiting and financing, and successfully encountering the French officialdom. Five influential men instrumental in providing this organizational support included:

- (1) French Foreign Affairs Ministry Official Messr. Maximilien Jarousse de Sillac (1873–1934): career diplomat and conservative French supporter for world peace; assigned as the French Preparatory Commission secretary for the Third Hague Conference that never took place due to the World War (Note: As a political analyst and supporter for the current French government, Messr. Maximilien Jarousse de Sillac envisioned that there might be great advantages in this creation of an American squadron. In a personal letter to his friend Colonel Bouttieaux (written early February 1915), he stated: "The United States would be proud of the fact that certain of her young men, acting as did Lafayette, had come to fight for France and civilization. The resulting sentiment of enthusiasm could have but one effect: to turn the Americans in the direction of the Allies". Attached to this letter was a memo containing the names of the six Americans (William Thaw, Bert Hall, James Bach, Norman Prince, Frazier Curtis, Elliott C. Cowdin). A short reply by letter from Colonel Bouttieaux (dated: 24 February 1915) provided: "I think that your candidates will be welcomed. They should contract an engagement in the French Army for the duration of the war, and should fly only the aeroplanes customarily used in the French Aviation Service". Thus, history should take note that credit goes to M. Jarousse de Sillac for identifying a name for this "all American squadron" – Lafayette Escadrille. Reference source: Flammer, Philip M. The Vivid Air: The Lafayette Escadrille. Chapter 1: "The Genesis of the Lafayette Escadrille", pp. 18–19. University of Georgia Press: Athens, Georgia, 2008.)
- (2) Dr. Edmund L. Gros, M.D. (1869–1942): Chief Surgeon & Director of the American Ambulance Corps headquartered in the American hospital at Neuilly-sur-Seine, western suburb of Paris, France; resident of 23 Ave. du Bois de Boulogne, Paris, France (5 January 1911 – September 1940).
- (3) Mr. Frederick Hobbs Allen (1858–1937): Harvard graduate, 1883 with LLB. and AM.; established law firm Allen & Cammann (1900); member of the American Legion and Sons of the American Revolution; residing in Paris when war erupted and became a member of a committee to assist the American embassy in the emergency, and was a chairman of a subcommittee appointed to repatriate American citizens when his advice was requested. He provided U.S. legal guidance that avoided international technicalities confronting American citizens desiring to fight in a foreign war prior to U.S. entry in April 1917.
- (4) Colonel Thomas Bentley Mott, US, Artillery Corps, American Expeditionary Force (1865–1952): graduate of USMA, 1886; served as the senior U.S. Army military attaché to the American embassy in Paris, France, 1914–1921. His support came from being a U.S. Army liaison officer for General John J. Pershing on the staff of Marshal Ferdinand Foch.
- (5) Brigadier General Victor Paul Bouttieaux, French Army (1858–1918): A recipient of the highest honor bestowed by France – Officer of the Legion of Honour (1913), he was influential within the French Army staff as Aviation Chief of the French 1st Army (commanded by General Auguste Dubail), reporting directly to the Chief of Staff – General Marie-Georges Demange concerning balloons, airships, and aircraft. In this capacity he commanded six aviation squadrons (1914–1918). (Note: Colonel Victor Paul Bouttieaux: prior to the commencement of World War I, he was actively involved with the development and advances in heavier-than-air aeroplane technology and lighter-than-air airships, and was responsible for identifying such technological advancements to the Ministry of War for the French Aviation Service. For example, on 28 December 1910, he visited Chalons Camp (Châlons-en-Champagne) in order to observe and report on the new biplane with hood for military use built by Mr. Henry Farman. When France entered into World War I, Colonel Bouttieaux was a leading military aeronautical subject matter expert for the French Ministry of War. This was the main reason why he was chosen as one of the five key committee members to analyze the requirements of Captain Georges Thenault's idea of a new squadron of flyers comprising his countrymen and of French Foreign Legion volunteers. His knowledge with dirigibles and balloons were developed into his book titled La Navigation Aerienne Par Ballons Dirigeables or Air Navigation by Airships (1909, Paris, France). His accidental death while on active duty came too early in life; a great loss for French aeronautics funding, research, and development.)

This team of five experts identified the many issues involved and the obstacles that had to be overcome, and helped the first American volunteers to develop a plan:

"There were Americans fighting in the Foreign Legion, but their identity was lost in this body; they were simply units in a tremendous group. Dr. Gros and his associates dreamed of some other form of service in which Americans might participate as Americans, even though the flag of the United States might not officially be carried into the war. The idea was constantly before them, and, when they found that among the Americans already in France and already anxious to help as best they might, were men who had learned the art of flying in this country, the plan for a special American flying corps was conceived and developed."

Final approval for this plan was given by Major General Auguste Edouard Hirschauer (16 June 1857, Saint-Avold, Moselle, Lorraine region of France – 27 December 1943, Versailles, Yvelines, region Ile-de-France) – Chief of French Military Aeronautics for the Ministry of War (1914–1915).

General Auguste-Edouard Hirschauer, Chief of French Military Aeronautics, contemplating changes to the French Aviation Service, 1917

It started with a group of American volunteers (Norman Prince, William Thaw, (Note: He was the only member of the original squadron of volunteers who served with it throughout the entire period of its existence.) Victor Chapman, Kiffin Rockwell, James McConnell, Clyde Balsley, Chouteau Johnson, Lawrence Rumsey, Paul Rockwell) in Paris, France, where they met to discuss how would one be able to enter the French Aviation Service to fly combat missions against the Germans. They met Monday evening, 17 April 1916, at a Paris restaurant to celebrate the final and definite organization of the Escadrille Americaine.

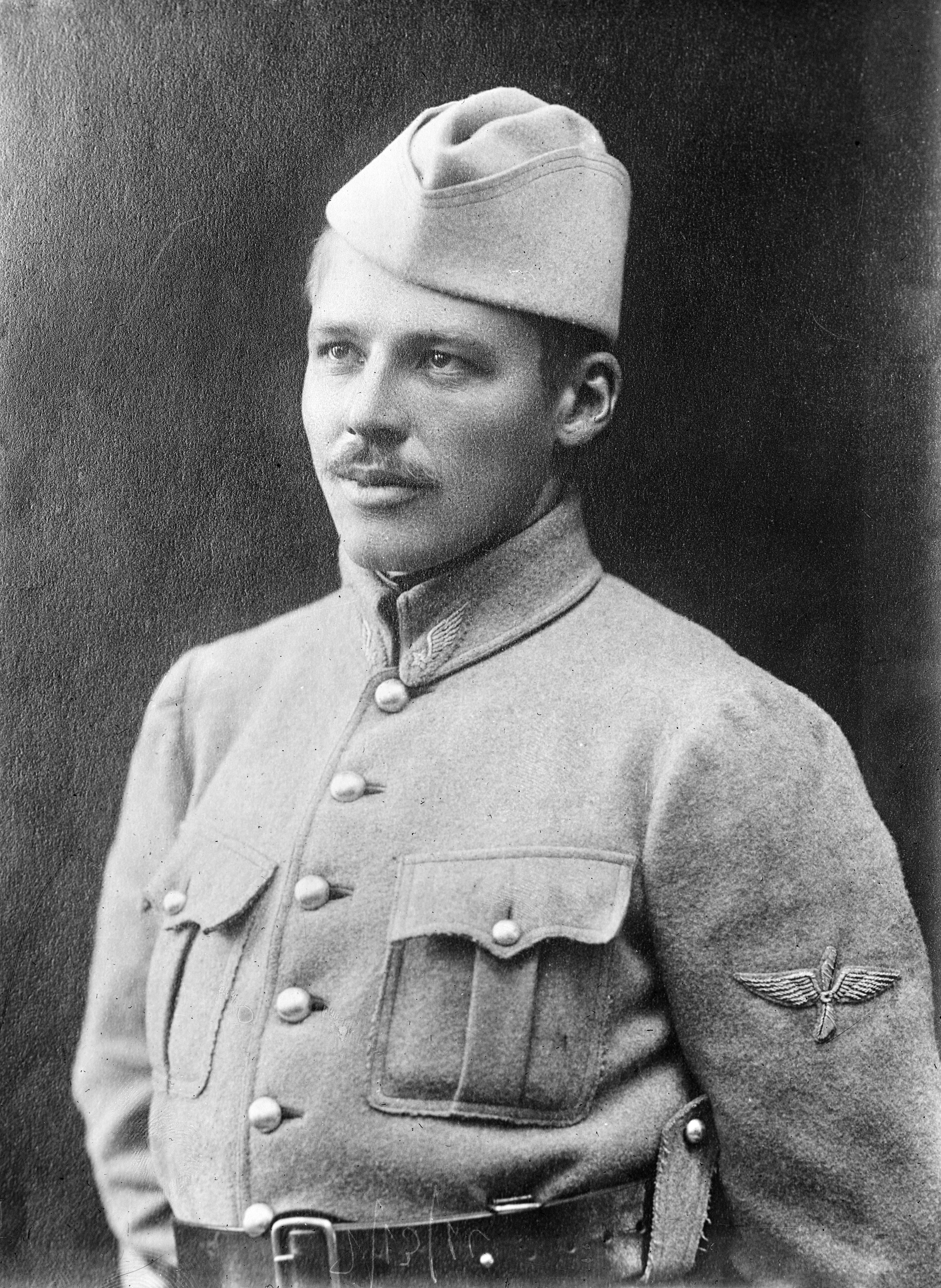
Adjudant Norman Prince, originator of the idea to create an all American squadron in France – the Lafayette Escadrille N.124

They became the first group to enter the French Aviation Service under the guidance of a distinguished French pilot, Captain Georges Thenault. The Escadrille N.124, first called the Escadrille Americaine, then the Escadrille des Volontaires, and finally the Escadrille Lafayette, was formed on Wednesday, 15 March 1916, under the command of Captain Georges Thenault. Into this squadron came more American volunteers who were at one time automobile mechanics, ambulance drivers, and members of the French Foreign Legion. They became an elite corps of volunteers administratively assigned to this squadron. Thus, began the association called the Franco-American Flying Corps – later to be known as the Lafayette Flying Corps.

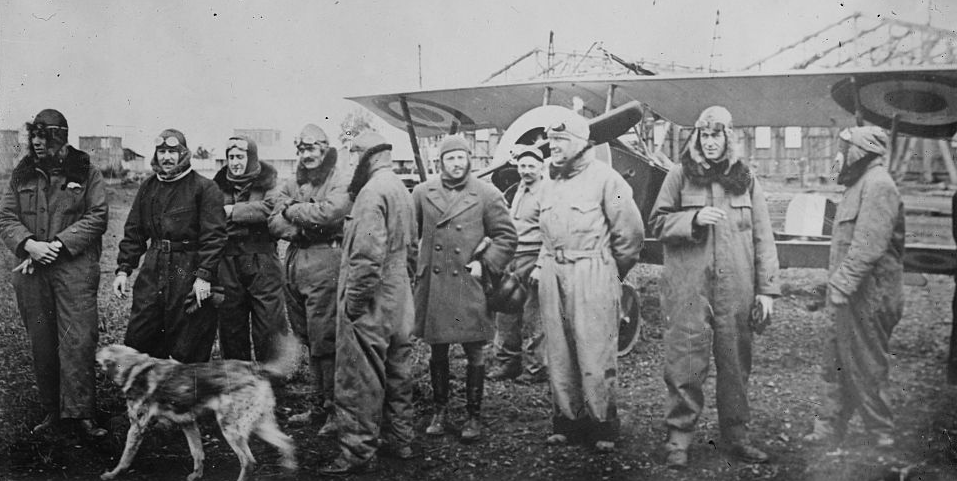
Lafayette Escadrille pilots with Fram and a Nieuport 16, March 1916. Pilots L-R: Sergeant Victor Chapman (New York City, US), Sergeant Elliot Christopher Cowdin (New York City, US), Adjutant Bert Hall (Missouri, US), Lieutenant William Thaw (Pittsburgh, Pennsylvania, US), Lieutenant Alfred de Laage de Meux (Clesse, Deux Sèvres, France), Sous-Lieutenant Norman Prince (Boston, Massachusetts, US), Sergeant James R. McConnell (Carthage, North Carolina, US), Sergeant Kiffin Yates Rockwell (Asheville, North Carolina, US), Captain Georges Thenault (Paris, France), and Fram – Captain Thenault's "bon chien"

The Lafayette Escadrille was from the beginning a chasse, or pursuit, squadron. Originally provided with the thirteen (square)-meter Nieuport 11, armed with a single Lewis gun on the top plane, it changed successively to the Vickers-armed fifteen (square)-meter Nieuport 17, SPAD S.VII with a single Vickers machinegun, and the SPAD S.XIII with the twin-Vickers machinegun.

Marshal Philippe Pétain, Commander-in-Chief of the French forces, commended the Lafayette squadron, composed of American airmen, for its courage, spirit and sacrifice. In the French general orders of 31 Aug 1917, the Marshal said:

"The squadrilla, composed of American volunteers who have come to fight for France in the pure spirit of sacrifice, has fought incessantly under the command of Captain Georges Thenault, who formed it for an ardent fight against our enemies. In very severe combats it has paid the price of serious losses, which, far from weakening, have increased its morale. The squadrilla has brought down twenty-eight enemy aeroplanes. It has aroused the profound admiration of commanders who have had it under their orders, and also of French squadrillas which are fighting beside it and have desired to rival it in valor".

Between 20 October 1917 to early February 1918, the process of releasing the American volunteers from the Lafayette Escadrille so that they could become commissioned pilots of the United States Army Air Service was slow. This was mainly due to the required bureaucratic civil and military endorsements that took place between the French Bureau of the Minister of War and to the American Expeditionary Force, Chief of Staff Major General James William McAndrew, U.S.A.

On Monday, 18 February 1918, under the provisions of a curious and interesting agreement between the French and American armies, the Lafayette Escadrille became the 103d Aero Squadron – originally known as 103d Pursuit Squadron – United States Army Air Service. During its tenure, the Lafayette Escadrille had officially confirmed by the military authorities, 199 German aircraft. Of these volunteer pilots, five died of illness; six by accidents in the aviation schools; fifteen were taken prisoners; nineteen were wounded in combat; and, fifty-one were killed over the front lines. The French government recognized the American volunteers for their heroic achievements in the skies over France with the following: four Legions of Honor, seven Medailles Militaires, and thirty-one citations (each with a Croix de Guerre).

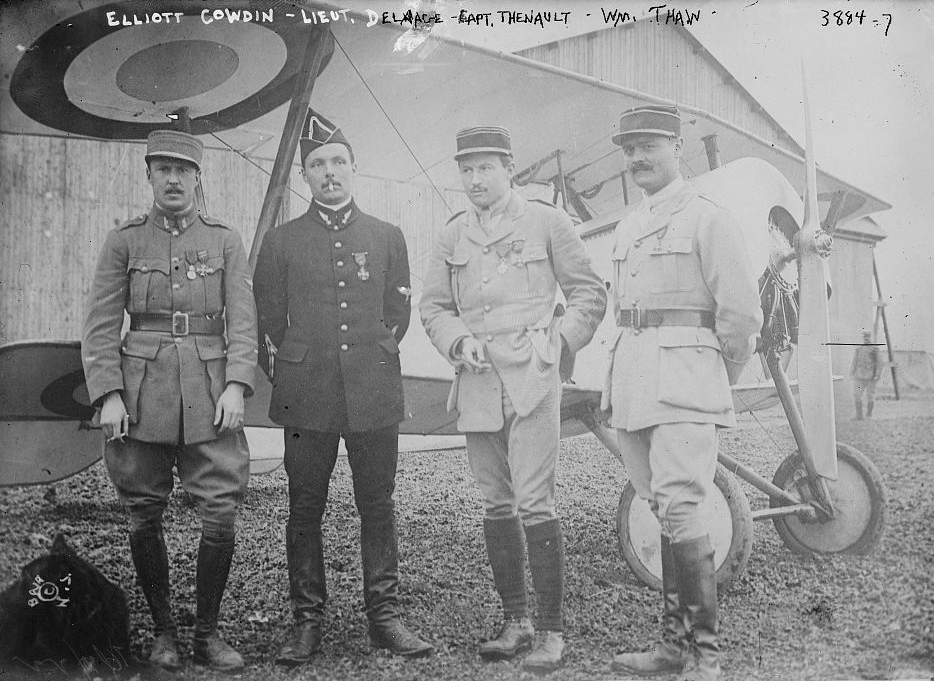
Spring 1916 adjacent to a Nieuport 16: Captain Georges Thenault with squadron pilots, L-R: Sergeant Elliot Christopher Cowdin (New York City, US), Lieutenant Alfred de Laage de Meux (Deux Sèvres, France), Captain Georges Thenault (Paris, France), Lieutenant William Thaw (Pennsylvania, US)

After the disbandment of the LaFayette Escadrille, Captain Thenault accepted orders as chief pilot at the French School of Aerial Acrobacy & Combat at Pau, Pyrénées-Atlantiques, remaining there for the duration of the war.

== Interwar years ==
Following the end of World War I, Captain Thenault continued military service in the Armée de l'Air (ALA) – literally Air Army, and found time to compile his personal diary notes into a historical work pertaining to the famous LaFayette Escadrille. Captain Thenault wrote his book at his home located in Vaux-en-Couhe Vienne France (Vaux, Vienne). Between 1919 and 1921, Thenault purposely wrote this book to place on record the exploits and sacrifices of those daring American volunteers who served under his command and who gave so noble a response to the "deed of LaFayette" whom they chose as their namesake.

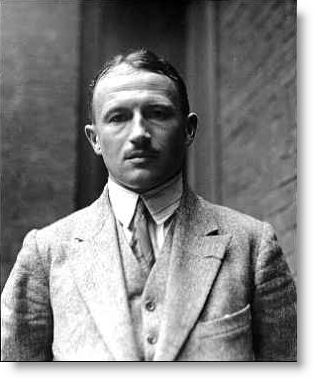
Captain Georges Thenault, French Aviation Service; assignment as Assistant Military Attache for Aeronautics at the French embassy, Washington DC, 27 July 1922

Captain Thenault's book gained widespread American public recognition. In May 1922, he accepted an assignment that began an eleven-year diplomatic service in the Embassy of France in Washington, D.C. This started with the position of Assistant Military Attaché for Aeronautics and later evolved into the position of Military Attaché for Aeronautics at the French Embassy in Washington DC (1922–1933). Thenault's travel to the United States began under a French diplomatic passport to the French embassy in Washington DC aboard SS France (1910) departing from Port of Le Havre, Saturday, 15 July 1922, and arriving Port of New York, Saturday, 22 July 1922.

Late fall 1922 plans were announced of Captain Georges Thenault to wed Mlle. Paule Dumont in Washington DC – daughter of the French embassy's Military Attaché for Aeronautics Colonel George A. L. Dumont, French Air Army. The wedding was to have taken place in the fall of 1922.

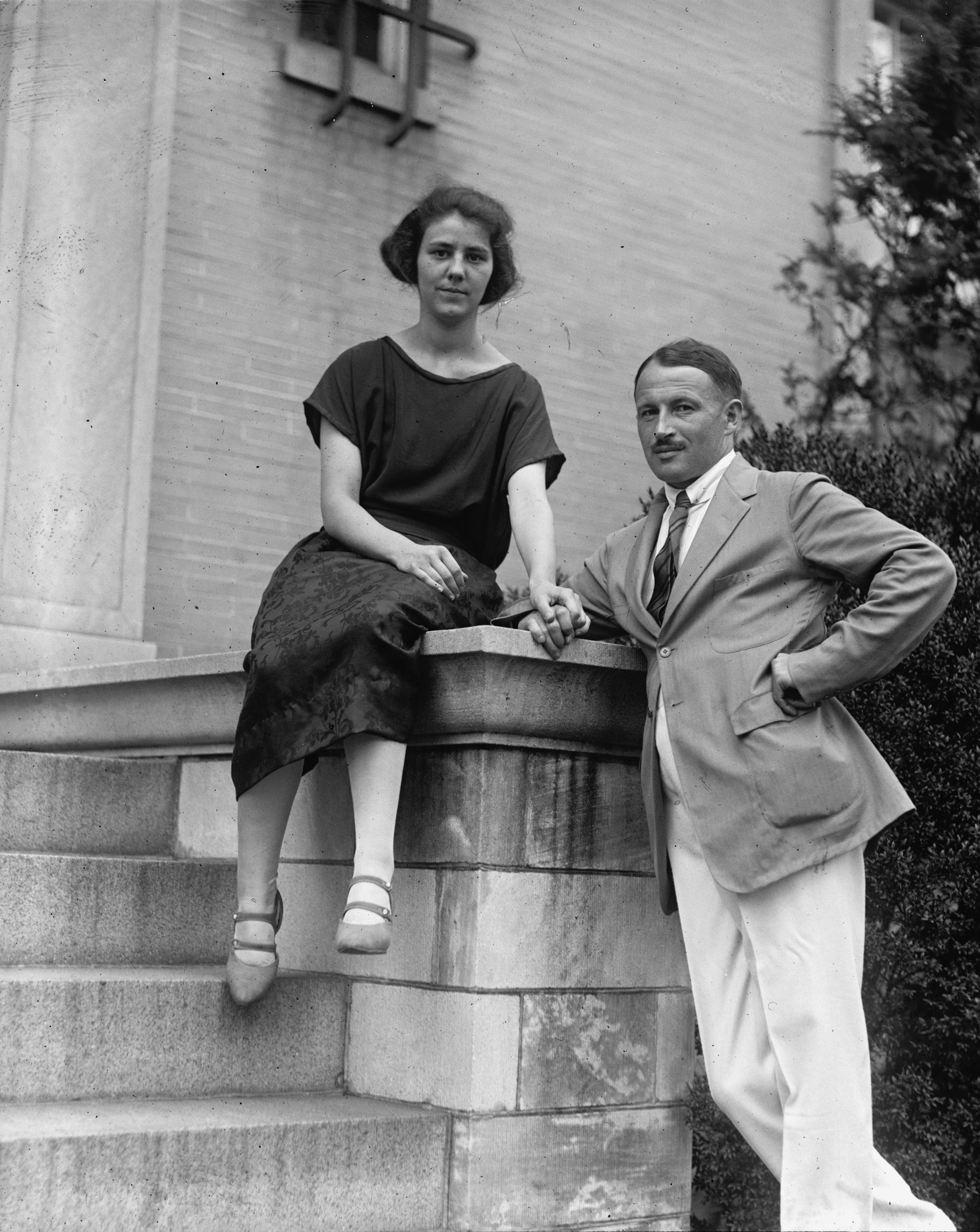
Mlle. Paule Dumont and Captain Georges Thenault, at the French embassy, Washington DC, 12 September 1922

Then in the fall of 1925, the engagement of Ms. Sarah Spencer to Commandant Georges Thenault was announced in Washington DC society circles. She was the daughter of Oliver Martin Spencer of Chicago (general solicitor of the Chicago, Burlington and Quincy Railroad) and of Mrs. Katherine (Turner) "Danny" Spencer, and a grandniece of the Honorable William J. Stone of Ripley County, Missouri.

A number of U.S. Army Air Service and French Aviation Service aviators who won their spurs during the World War periodically made visits to the French embassy, attending conferences, luncheons and dinner engagements in Washington DC. One of the well-known visitors at the time was Captain René Fonck, French Aviation Service. He arrived in the United States at the Port of New York aboard the steamship RMS Olympic, on Tuesday, 6 October 1925. Captain Fonck was in Washington DC for two reasons: (1) upon the invitation from the defense attorney for Colonel Billy Mitchell, U.S. Army Air Service; and, (2) to attend the international air race at Mitchell Field, Long Island, for the Schneider Trophy. Colonel Mitchell invited Captain Fonck on his behalf to reveal the truth about French aviation against the Riffs, and to testify the French Aviation Service had broken down against the Riffs because the fliers were placed under the command of infantry and artillery officers who had no flying experience.

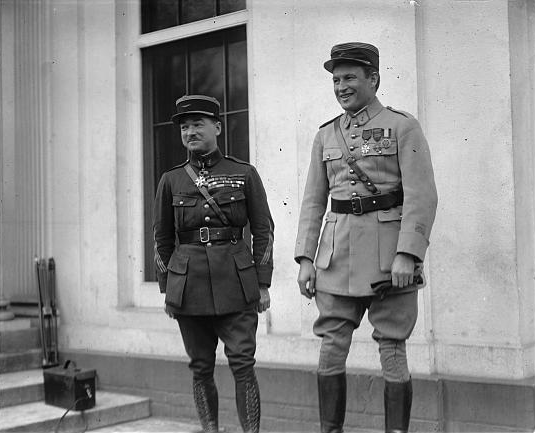
Commandant Georges Thenault and Captain Rene Fonck at front entrance to French embassy, Washington DC, 29 October 1925.

Promoted to commandant in 1923, Thenault completed his six-year tour as military attaché in spring 1928, went to France and later returned to the United States reporting to the French embassy in Washington DC, Friday, 27 July 1928, as Military Attaché for Aeronautics – replacing newly promoted Brigadier Gen Georges Armand Louis Dumont In this assignment Commandant Thenault sought to strengthen bonds of friendship between the United States and France by traveling through a number of cities visiting aircraft factories, conferring with aeronautical experts, and inspecting Army air stations in order to keep his government informed of American progress in the aircraft industry.

In response to request of U.S. Assistant Secretary of the Navy Edward Pearson Warner, the National Advisory Committee for Aeronautics established on 1 March 1928, a special committee on the nomenclature, subdivision, and classification of aircraft accidents, for the purpose of preparing a basis for the classification and comparison of aircraft accidents, both civil and military. A plan was devised for the division of the immediate causes of aircraft accidents into four major classes and for the further subdivision of these major classes as seemed desirable, together with proposed definitions of these classes and subdivisions, was submitted for consideration at the first meeting, and discussed further at additional meetings. The meeting conducted on 22 May 1928 was attended by Wing Commander Thomas Gerard Hetherington (air attaché, British Embassy); Lieutenant Yoshitake Miwa (Imperial Japanese Navy, assistant naval attaché, Japanese Embassy); Commander Silvio Scaroni, air attaché, Italian Embassy); Major Georges Thenault (assistant military attaché for aeronautics, French Embassy). At this particular meeting the method of analyzing aircraft accidents according to immediate causes was explained and the value of a uniform system for reporting accidents was discussed. This significant meeting resulted in the establishment of a procedure for the international exchange of information regarding aircraft accidents. The method of analysis was shortly adopted for use by the United States Army Air Corps, the Bureau of Aeronautics of the Navy, and the Aeronautics Branch of the United States Department of Commerce.

Promoted to lieutenant colonel in 1933 following successful completion of duties as military attaché for aeronautics at the French embassy in Washington DC, he returned to France and continued his military services with the French Air Army.

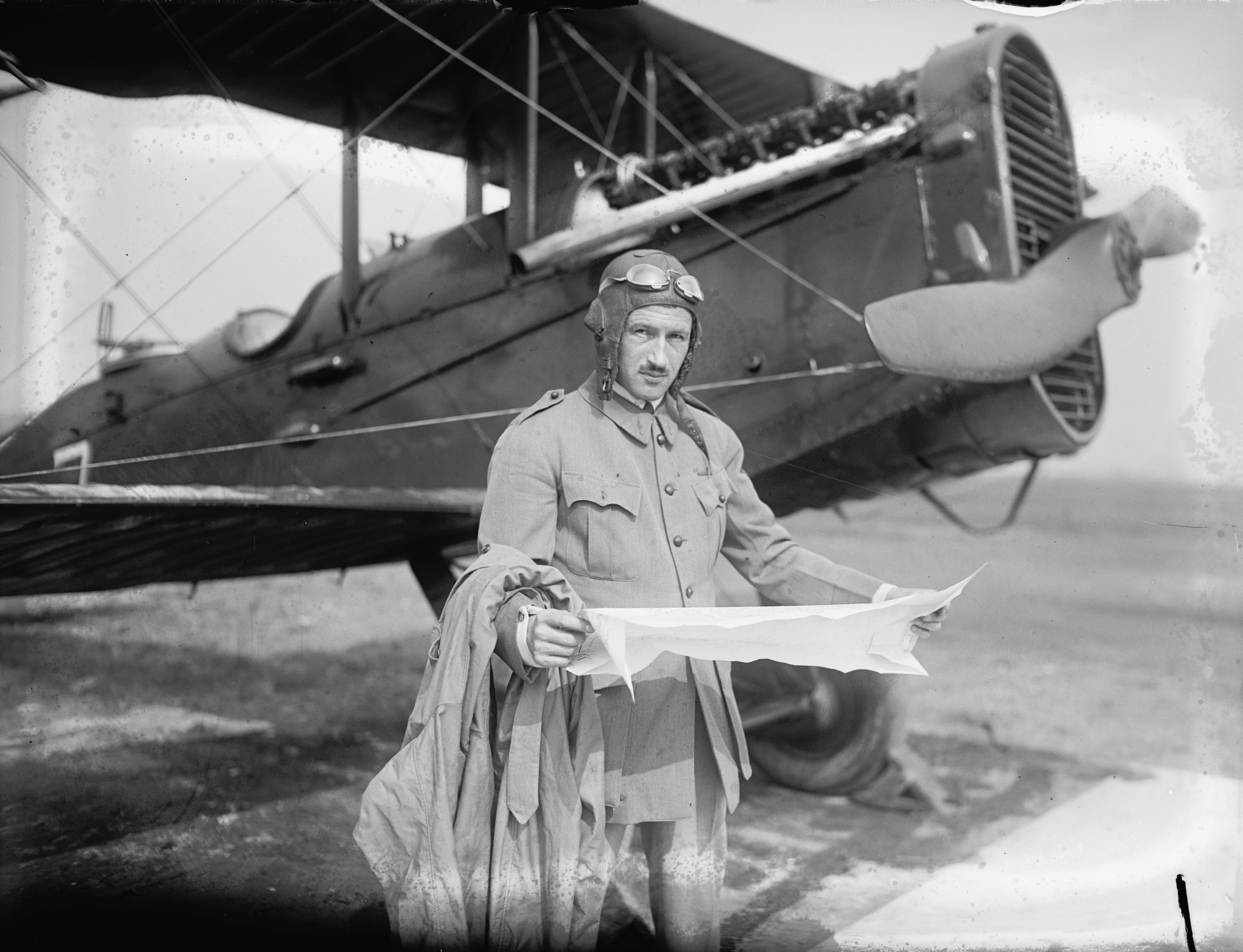
Captain Georges Thenault, French Aviation Service, preparing for "tour of USA"; next to DH-4 U.S. Army Air Service aircraft

== World War II ==
Lieutenant Colonel Thenault with his family (wife Sarah, children Catherine and Georges) were residing in France when World War II erupted. Their residence was 56 Rue Tahère Saint-Cloud – western suburb of Paris. Prior to the armistice and the cease-fire that went into effect on Tuesday, 25 June 1940, Georges Thenault had plans in place to remove his American wife, the two children, and mother-in-law Katherine "Danny" Spencer out of Europe. In mid-July 1940, using their U.S. passports as identification, Danny and Sarah with the two children were able to travel through Spain via train to reach the Port of Lisbon, Portugal, where they boarded SS Exochorda on Thursday, 25 July. Crossing at high speed over the steamship was able to successfully transit through the U-boat infested waters of the North Atlantic, to arrive at the Port of New York, Friday, 2 August 1940. With Katherine, Sarah and the two children eventually arrived at Harwich Port, Massachusetts, where they resided in the home of her mother during remainder of World War II.

During World War II, Thenault resided in the Occupied Zone of France (Military Administration in Belgium and North France) involved with personal business while his wife Sarah resided at Harwich Port, Massachusetts, with their two children: Georges Spencer and Catherine Bathilde.

== Final years ==
While on a hunting trip outside Paris, Thenault suffered a heart attack. He died in Paris, France, on Sunday, 19 December 1948. He was buried on Thursday, 30 December 1948, with all military rites in the presence of many French and American representatives in the crypt of the LaFayette Escadrille Memorial Monument in the park of Villeneuve L'etang, between the suburbs of Garches and Marnes-la-Coquette. Details of the burial services are obtained from a special article from The New York Times:

COL. THENAULT IS BURIED. Rites for French Air Hero Held at Lafayette Escadrille Park. Special to The New York Times. PARIS, Dec. 30 – In the presence of many French and American aviation enthusiasts including fliers of both World Wars, Col. Georges Thenault, French pilot who commanded the Lafayette Escadrille in the first World War, was buried with military rites today. The burial was in the crypt of the Lafayette Escadrille Memorial in the park of Ville-neuve L'etang, between the suburbs of Garches and Marne la Coquette. The memorial, endowed by the generosity of the late William Nelson Cromwell, serves also as the tomb for pilots who were with the squadron and as a monument on which has been inscribed the names of all the American volunteers. Present at the ceremonies today were Jean Moreau, Secretary of State for Air; Col. Francis Valentine, air attaché of the American Embassy; Vice Marshal Robert Allingham George, air attaché of the British Embassy; representatives of the American Aero Club of France and delegates of veterans' organizations.

== Family ==
Thenault was the son of Monsieur and Madame Paul Thenault of Coulombiers, Vienne, France. His wife was the former Ms. Sarah Spencer, and from this union two children were raised: Georges "Tom" Spencer Thenault and Catherine Bathilde Thenault.

Of significant importance is the fact that the son of Colonel Georges & Sarah (Spencer) Thenault, PFC Georges Spencer Thenault, USA, married Ms. Beatrice Ashmead MacArthur on Saturday, 14 May 1955, in St. Margaret’s Episcopal Church (Annapolis, Maryland). Details are derived from The New York Times special article released from Washington DC on 14 May 1955:

According to the morning edition of The Boston Globe, Tuesday, 12 January 2010, the son of Lieutenant Colonel Georges and Sarah (Spencer) Thenault, Georges "Tom" Spencer Thenault, of Harwich Port and Yarmouth Port died at his home on Saturday, 9 January 2010.

== World War I Lafayette Escadrille N.124 Citations ==
- The Lafayette Escadrille was mentioned in the French Army Orders of 23 August 1917 for its gallantry and spirit of sacrifice. This citation, which was signed by General Philippe Pétain, commander-in-chief of the French armies operating on the French front, stated:

"The squadrilla, composed of American volunteers who have come to fight for France in the pure spirit of sacrifice, has fought incessantly under the command of Captain Georges Thenault, who formed it for an ardent flight against our enemies. In very severe combats it has paid for the price of serious losses, which, far from weakening, have increased its morale. The squadrilla has brought down twenty-eight enemy airplanes. It has aroused the profound admiration of commanders who have had it under their orders, and also of French squadrillas which are fighting beside it and have desired to rival it in valor".

- According to an article published within the Aerial Age Weekly journal, the War Department Director of Military Aeronautics Brigadier General William L. Kenly, U.S.A., announced having received (February 1919) a second list of Honors and Awards conferred upon American Aero Squadrons and flying officers of the American Expeditionary Forces. This listing gives citations of five squadrons, including the Lafayette Escadrille, the 17th and 148th which were the British; the 90th and the 99th Squadrons. The citation of the Lafayette Squadron, formerly the Lafayette Escadrille, was signed by General Petain and read as follows:

"Brilliant unit which has shown itself, during the course of operations in Flanders, worthy of its glorious past. In spite of losses which took away a third of its effectives, in a difficult sector, it has assured a perfect security to our Corps Observation airplanes, a complete service of reconnaissance at both high and low altitude, and the destruction, not only near the front lines but deep in the enemy's territory, of a great number of German airplanes and captive balloons".

- According to an article published within the Aerial Age Weekly journal, the War Department Director of Military Aeronautics Brigadier General William L. Kenly, U.S.A., was advised (February 1919) by cable from General Pershing, that the 103d Aero Squadron, formerly the Lafayette Escadrille, was one of the two organizations of the A.E.F. entitled to wear Fourragers awarded by the French government. This organization was awarded the Fourragers in the colors of the Croix de Guerre, having received two citations of the French Orders of the Army.

== World War I service record ==
- FRENCH AVIATION SERVICE ASSIGNMENTS:
  - From the beginning of the war.
  - Ecole militaire d'Avord, 12 January to 23 March 1915. Lieutenant Thenault trained in the Nieuport 12.
  - AT THE FRONT:
    - Escadrille C.11, lieutenant, August to 1 December 1914.
    - Escadrille C.34, 25 March 1915. Promoted to captain, May 1915.
    - Escadrille C.42, détachement de l'armée de Lorraine (D.A.L.), commanding officer, 31 July 1915.
    - Escadrille LaFayette N.124, commanding officer, 9 April 1916 to 18 January 1918.
  - Chief pilot, School of Acrobacy & Combat at Pau, 18 January 1918 to Armistice
  - Assistant military attache for aeronautics: French embassy, Washington DC (1922–1925)
  - Military Attache for Aeronautics: French embassy, Washington DC (1925–1933)
  - Final rank: lieutenant colonel
- DECORATIONS:
  - Légion d'honneur
  - Croix de Guerre, with four Palms
  - Fourragère in the colors of the Croix de Guerre
  - CITATIONS:
    - French Order of the Army, 27 August 1914, while serving with the Escadrille C.11
    - Legion of Honor, 29 October 1914, while serving with the Escadrille C.11

== In popular culture ==
The character of Georges Thenault was played by the French actor Jean Reno in the 2006 American movie Flyboys.
