= Superhost =

American actor (1932–2020)

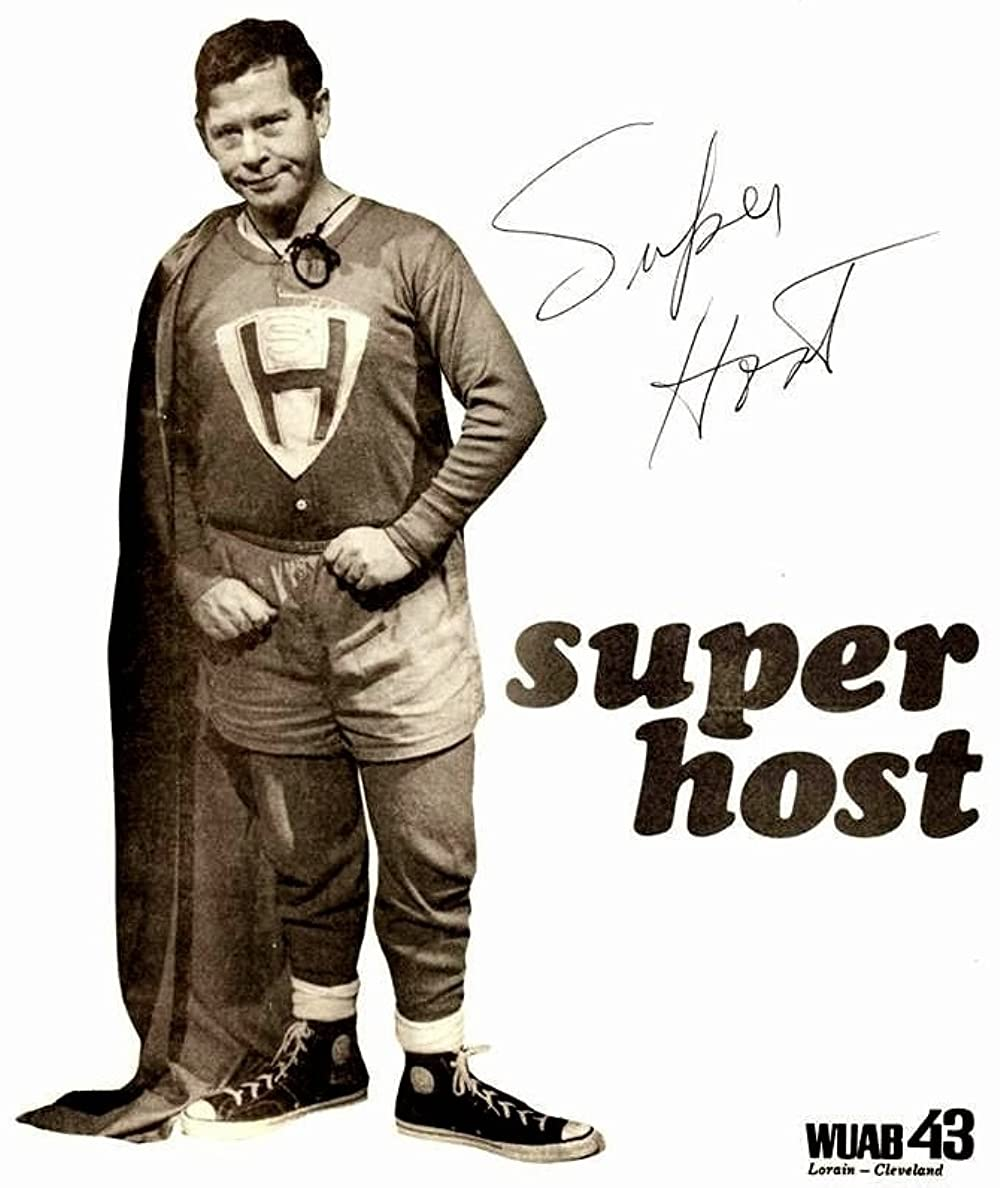
- Marty Sullivan as Superhost in a 1975 publicity picture
- Born: Marty Sullivan; March 5, 1932; Detroit, Michigan, U.S.
- Died: February 21, 2020 (aged 87); Berkeley Springs, West Virginia, U.S.
- Education: Assumption College (now University of Windsor)
- Occupations: Local radio and TV personality
- Years active: 1969–1993

Superhost (March 5, 1932 – February 21, 2020) was an American character portrayed by TV personality Marty Sullivan at independent television station WUAB channel 43 in Cleveland from 1969 to 1989. He wore a baggy suit, cape and red nose (like a clown version of Superman) to host the station's Saturday afternoon monster movie.

== Early life ==
Sullivan was born on March 5, 1932, in Detroit, Michigan. He went to Assumption College (now University of Windsor), and served in the U.S. Navy.

== Show format ==
The show would begin at noon with Supe's On!, an hour-long warm-up to the movies, with two Three Stooges shorts, and usually a Laurel and Hardy short as well. Superhost would appear during commercial breaks, cracking jokes, showing skits, and talking to the TV audience.

Superhost greeted fans with his famous "Hello, dere" (pronounced "dare") and follow with sketches like "The Moronic Woman" (a parody of The Bionic Woman) "Caboose Supe" (a Boxcar Willie takeoff), and "Fat Whitman" (a spoof of Slim Whitman). His most famous sketch was a music video based on the popular trucker song "Convoy". He was also known for referring to the movies as "flicks" as in "Let's get back to da flick."

After Supe's On, he would host an afternoon of films under the Mad Theater banner. Generally two films were shown, going from 1 to 4 p.m. The movies would be old horror films like Frankenstein or Japanese monster movies such as Godzilla.

As the 1980s went along, with WCW Worldwide Wrestling and other more contemporary syndicated weekend programming becoming available, the show began getting trimmed down for time. First to the Supe's On hour (11:30 a.m. to 12:30 p.m.) plus one movie (12:30 to 2 p.m) in 1985, then in 1987, the entire show was shortened to one hour under the Supe's On! banner, with Superhost appearing during commercial breaks during one episode each of The Munsters and Batman from 11 a.m. to noon. From 1988 until its finale in December 1989, the show was then changed to an hour of Three Stooges shorts (with a cartoon thrown in), and Superhost appearing during commercial breaks, all under the Supe's On with the Three Stooges! banner from 11 a.m. to noon (then towards the end moved to 1 p.m. to 2 p.m.)

== Other roles ==
In addition to playing Superhost, Sullivan was a longtime floor director and staff announcer for WUAB, and without the Superhost costume, also occasionally hosted the daily afternoon Prize Movie, when usual host John Lanigan was off. Even post Superhost, he would continue to fill in for Lanigan until Sullivan retired in 1993.

He also filled in anchoring news breaks during the primetime Star Movie when usual anchor Gary Short was off. Sullivan had come to WUAB with some news background, as prior to his career at WUAB, Sullivan worked as an announcer and news reporter for WGAR AM 1220 in Cleveland. Among the major stories Sullivan had covered at WGAR was the Hough Riots.

Sullivan (in character as Superhost) appeared in a few skits for WJW's Hoolihan & Big Chuck Show (later The Big Chuck & Lil' John Show) over the years, notably in one installment of the popular "Soulman" sketch of the 1970s. Despite being on a rival station, Sullivan has stated they were good guys and never direct competition to his show.

In a story Sullivan liked to tell, he would sometimes be pressed into service on a Friday night when taping the Superhost show, and have to also do the live news breaks. So he'd quickly put on a jacket, shirt, and tie to do the news, while under the desk, he'd still have his Superhost costume on.

He served in this capacity until 1988, when WUAB began their nightly Ten O'Clock News newscast. Sullivan would later joke that "it took an over 30 person news staff to replace me".

== Death ==
Sullivan died on February 21, 2020, at the age of 87 in Berkeley Springs, West Virginia.

== Awards and honors ==
- 1997 NATAS (Lower Great Lakes Chapter) Silver Circle Award
- Ohio Broadcasters Hall of Fame Inductee (class of 1991)
- Horror Host Hall of Fame inductee (class of 2015)
