= Jennifer Decker =

French actress

- Born: 28 December 1982 (age 42)
- Occupation: Actress
- Spouse: Bradley George Arnold

Jennifer Decker (born 28 December 1982) is a French actress. She is best known for the role of Lucienne in the 2006 American film Flyboys.

== Life and career ==
Jennifer began her theatrical career at an early age. At 18 she was spotted by director Irina Brook, who gave her the role of Juliet in a stage production of Shakespeare's Romeo and Juliet. After a successful run at the Théâtre national de Chaillot in Paris, the play went on tour throughout France, and then abroad for many months.

Jennifer next played a young teenager in love and on the run, the leading part in Steve Suissa's Cavale (L'Amour dangereux). She is continuing to extend the range of her on-stage performances at the Commedia dell'arte.

Afterward, she began to show interest in cinematography. For this she next appeared in Steve Suissa's "L'Amour Dangereux" (Love on the run) also known as Trop Plain D'amour and Cavale, opposite Nicolas Cazalé. Jennifer Decker played Noémie, a young teenager who goes on the run with Simon, a boy who's on the fast track of life.

Although Jennifer tends to focus on feature films, she shows interest in short-films too. For this she was seen next in Pierre Bernier's, Jeux de Haute Société (2003), a short-film, in which she plays Madame Blanche.

She started in the renowned French series Une Femme d'Honneur (2005), in the episode of Les Liens du Sang, playing as Laëtitia Cervantes, an intense character. Jennifer completed four films in 2006. She started the year with Jeune Homme, a Swiss film, in which she plays Elodie Dumoulin, a young artist, who takes drawing lessons and meets the lead character, Sebastian, played by Matthias Schoch. Sebastian is a new transfer student from abroad who came to study in France. Sebastian stayed with a French family who, coincidentally, is Elodie's family.

After Jeune Homme, Jennifer starred in Les Amants Du Flore, an acclaimed film, directed by Ilan Duran Cohen, starring Anna Mouglalis. Jennifer played Marina, a sensitive student, who at first fell in love with her teacher, Simone de Beauvoir, but later fell for a lover who died due to the consequences of the second world war.

In 2006, she was discovered by Tony Bill while he was vacationing in Paris. She was soon cast as Lucienne, opposite James Franco and Jean Reno. This became the debut of Jennifer's career as feature film actress, for which she received the attention of critics and an international audience.

In 2006 Jennifer returned to France for a television film revolving around the life of Jeanne Poisson, la Pompadour. The film title is Jeanne Poisson, Marquise de Pompadour (2006). Jennifer plays La Dauphine, who is the wife of Jeanne Poisson's husband's best friend. She plays an older character, rather than the usual character she on which she previously focused.

After working with Robin Davis in Jeanne Poisson, Marquise de Pompadour, Jennifer starred in an even more interesting role, in the comedy as Hellphone (2007), directed by James Huth. The movie was unlike other Hellphone movies, for this one had a different angle to it. Jennifer plays Angie, the love interest of Sid, played by Jean-Baptist Maunier, who desperately wants to date her, but has no cell phone to contact her. Sid buys an amazing phone, which costs 30 euros at a cheap Chinese store, to be able to get a closer connection to Angie. He does not realize that the phone comes from Hell. This film earned a lot of press attention, and boosted Jennifer's career.

Jennifer took 2008 off from the movie industry. In 2009 she came back in the German film called Lulu & Jimi, opposite Ray Fearon, and directed by the acclaimed director Oskar Roehler. This film went on to be the official selection for the German film festival. Jenn plays Lulu, a very outgoing and rich German lady who falls deeply in love with Jimi, a black man who was a middle class worker in a fair near where Lulu lives. Over the disapproval of her family of Jimi, she runs away with him, running from one state to another. The film has a very colorful theme, and a rock & roll vibe.

After Lulu & Jimi, Jennifer starred in Erreur de la Banquet en Votre Faveur (2009), a French film directed by Gérard Bitton and Michel Munz. The film talks about a group of guys planning to steal from the city bank. Jennifer plays Harmony, who is a local employee. She falls in love with her boss, who happens to be one of the men involved in this great robbery scheme.

In 2010, Jennifer Decker played Laura, opposite Anaïs Demoustier and Pio Marmaï, in D'amour et D'eau Fraîche, directed by Isabelle Czajka. This was her second film with Anaïs Demoustier, the first one being Hellphone (2007).

Most recently, Jennifer would be found in France, filming a TV-film called Les Amants Naufragés, also known as Les Veufs for the novel on which it was based. The scheduled filming ended around November, and the movie would be released in 2011. It's directed by Jean-Christophe Delpias. Jennifer plays Mathilde, wife of Stan who is a writer. He had just finished writing his latest novel The Castaways. Stan is a very jealous lover, concerned that his alluring and beautiful wife Mathilde, who is a Model, is cheating on him. For that matter Stan sends his friend to spy on Mathilde who had lied about wanting to spend more time with her parents. Stan finds out that the parents were actually a handsome young fashion designer. With the rage he feels for Mathilde's infidelity, he arrives to surprise the lovers. He over-reacts in the scene, killing the young designer on the spot. But what if the author had mistaken fiction for fact?

The aforementioned listings are Theatrical acts Jennifer Decker has starred in, in addition to the renowned play she collaborated in with Block N'Fall, entitled "Novembre, Déjà" in 2009 and 2010.

== Selected filmography ==
Year	Title	Role	Notes
2015	Paris-Willouby	Angélique	
2011	Declaration of War	Girl at the party	
2010	Living on Love Alone	Laura	
2009	Lulu and Jimi	Lulu	
2009	Erreur de la banque en votre faveur	Harmony	
2007	Hellphone	Angie	
2006	Jeanne Poisson, Marquise de Pompadour	La Dauphine	
2006	Flyboys	Lucienne	
2006	Les Amants du Flore	Marina	
2006	Jeune Homme	Élodie Dumoulin	
2005	Une Femme d'Honneur	Laëtitia Cervantes	Episode Les Liens du Sang
2003	Jeux de Haute Société	Madame Blanche	
2003	L'Amour dangereux	Noémie	
