= Jack Corrigan (sportscaster) =

American sports broadcaster and author

- Born: John Joseph Corrigan; September 12, 1952 (age 73); Cleveland, Ohio, U.S.
- Occupations: Sports broadcaster Author
- Years active: 1979-present

John Joseph Corrigan (born September 12, 1952 in Cleveland, Ohio) is an American sports broadcaster and author. He has been the radio announcer for the Colorado Rockies in Major League Baseball since 2002. Previously, he spent 18 years as the television announcer for the Cleveland Indians.

== Early life and education ==
Corrigan grew up in the West Park neighborhood on Cleveland's west side. His large Irish-American family attended nearby Catholic church, Our Lady of Angels, where he also attended grade school. He attended St. Ignatius High School in Cleveland, where he played football, graduating in 1970.

He attended Cornell University, where he played wide receiver for four seasons. He graduated in 1974. He earned a master's degree in Speech from Kent State University. He wrote his master's thesis on NFL Films.

== Broadcasting career ==
Corrigan started his broadcasting career in Youngstown, Ohio. He then moved on to Richmond, Virginia, before returning to Cleveland. He spent 18 years in the television booth for the Cleveland Indians from 1983, 1985-2001 on WUAB, which had given him the longest tenure among television announcers in Indians history. Corrigan since has been surpassed by former Indians CF Rick Manning who started full-time in 1990 and is still with the team.

From 1982-1988 (during the baseball off season) he was the TV voice of the National Basketball Association's Cleveland Cavaliers, whose games were on WUAB.

=== Signature calls ===
- It's touch 'em all time for (player's name)! - for a home run hit by the Rockies (carried over from his time with the Indians).

== Author ==
In 2005, Corrigan wrote Warning Track, published by Peakview Press (May 25, 2005) ISBN 0-9766615-0-0.

== Personal life ==
Corrigan and his wife, Lisa, have two children, Megan and Mike. He also is the brother to Princeton University defensive end, Daniel Corrigan. Daniel Corrigan leads the Tigers in touchdowns, tackles, sacks and punt returns and currently is a history teacher at his alma mater Saint Ignatius High School.

In 2006, Jack Corrigan suffered two minor strokes, missing several games. He was diagnosed with atrial fibrillation.
