= Lulu and Jimi =

- Directed by: Oskar Roehler
- Written by: Oskar Roehler
- Produced by: Gabriela Sperl; Uwe Schott
- Starring: Jennifer Decker; Ray Fearon; Katrin Sass
- Cinematography: Wedigo von Schultzendorff
- Edited by: Bettina Böhler
- Music by: Martin Todsharow
- Distributed by: X Verleih AG (through Warner Bros.)
- Release date: February 2009
- Countries: Germany; France
- Languages: English; German

Lulu and Jimi is a 2009 drama film directed by Oskar Roehler. It is about the relationship between Lulu, a rich German girl and Jimi, a black man, and takes place in 1950s Germany.

== Plot ==
Lulu, a well-off German girl, falls in love with Jimi, the owner of a bumper cars stall. The problem is that he is black and her family doesn't approve of him, especially her mother. Lulu doesn't want the ridiculous boy her mother has found for her. Lulu and Jimi will do anything to be finally together.

== Cast ==
- Jennifer Decker as Lulu
- Ray Fearon as Jimi
- Katrin Sass as Gertrud, Lulu's mother
- Rolf Zacher as Daddy Cool and Lulu's father
- Udo Kier as Schulz, the chofer
- Bastian Pastewka as Ernst
- Ulrich Thomsen as Harry Hass
- Alexander Meyer as Lulu's brother
- Hans Michael Rehberg as Von Oppeln

== Music ==
Ray Fearon performs "Stand by me", the principal song in the movie.

== Festivals ==
It was projected in the Sundance Festival and in the Gijón Film Festival.
