= Flyboys (film) =

2006 film by Tony Bill

- Theatrical release poster
- Directed by: Tony Bill
- Screenplay by: Phil Sears; Blake T. Evans; David S. Ward
- Story by: Blake T. Evans
- Produced by: Dean Devlin; Marc Frydman
- Starring: James Franco; Martin Henderson; David Ellison; Jennifer Decker; Jean Reno
- Cinematography: Henry Braham
- Edited by: Chris Blunden; Ron Rosen
- Music by: Trevor Rabin
- Production companies: Electric Entertainment; Skydance Productions; Ingenious Media
- Distributed by: Metro-Goldwyn-Mayer Pictures (United States); Verve Pictures (United Kingdom)
- Release dates: September 22, 2006 (United States); June 1, 2007 (United Kingdom)
- Running time: 138 minutes
- Countries: United States; United Kingdom
- Language: English
- Budget: $60 million
- Box office: $17.8 million

Flyboys is a 2006 war drama film starring James Franco, Martin Henderson, David Ellison, Jennifer Decker and Jean Reno. It was directed by Tony Bill, a pilot and aviation enthusiast, and written by Phil Sears, Blake T. Evans, and David S. Ward. Set during World War I, the film follows the enlistment, training, and combat experiences of a group of young Americans who volunteered to become fighter pilots in the Lafayette Escadrille, the 124th air squadron formed by the French in 1916. Flyboys was released on September 22, 2006 by Metro-Goldwyn-Mayer Pictures in the United States and on June 1, 2007 by Verve Pictures in the United Kingdom. It received negative reviews from critics, who criticized the performances, screenplay and visual effects. It was a box-office bomb, grossing $17.8 million against its $60 million budget.

== Plot ==
In 1916, a group of Americans arrive in France to serve in the French Air Service, L'Aéronautique militaire, in World War I. They are placed under the command of Captain Georges Thenault, with veteran flying ace Reed Cassidy as their mentor.

Pilot Blaine Rawlings runs out of fuel on a practice flight and crashes. He meets a young woman named Lucienne and the two develop a relationship. During their first mission – escorting bombers to attack a German ammunition depot in Jametz – they are ambushed by German warplanes, and two of the rookies are killed. A third makes an emergency landing but is killed on the ground by "the Black Falcon" – a German pilot flying a black aircraft. The chivalrous German pilot Franz Wolferd shakes his head in disapproval.

In a later battle, Rawlings' machine gun jams while he is chasing Wolferd. Wolferd flies alongside and salutes before banking away. Higgins is killed in the battle, and Jensen suffers an emotional breakdown and is unable to fly again. The French military learns that Beagle fabricated personal information and accused him of being a spy. He admits to a crime he committed in the United States, and is allowed to stay on. The American pilots intercept Germans warplanes attacking a column of civilians. Rawlings kills Wolferd when he attacks another American pilot. Beagle is brought down in no man's land, and is trapped by the wreckage. Rawlings lands and attempts to free him with help from French soldiers but is forced to amputate Beagle's hand. Learning that German forces have entered Lucienne's village, Rawlings attempts to rescue her in a stolen plane. Lucienne is wounded during their escape, and Rawlings is awarded the Croix de Guerre for bravery by his grateful commander.

Porter is killed attacking a German Zeppelin and Cassidy, mortally wounded by the Black Falcon, flies into the zeppelin, destroying it. Rawlings reunites with Lucienne, is promotoed to Squadron Leader, and his plane is presented with an eagle, which had been Cassidy's insignia. Escorting another bombing run on the Jametz ammunition depot, Lowry's plane catches fire and he shoots himself. Rawlings fights through several enemy planes, shooting them down until only the Black Falcon remains. After a long dogfight, the wounded Rawlings comes alongside and shoots the Black Falcon dead with his pistol.

Jensen returns to Nebraska to a hero's welcome at the end of the war. Skinner enlists in the US Army but is kept from flying due to his race; he later joins the Airmail Service. Beagle marries an Italian woman and starts a flying circus. Rawlings tries to find Lucienne in Paris but returns to Texas alone, becomes a rancher, and never flies again.

== Cast ==
- James Franco as Blaine Rawlings: A Texan faced with the foreclosure of his family ranch in Texas, who decides to enlist after seeing a newsreel of aerial combat in France.
- Martin Henderson as Reed Cassidy: A character based upon the real Raoul Lufbery, evident in the references to the squadron mascot, Whiskey the lion. A fellow American, womanizer, traumatized ace pilot, and the pilots' mentor.
- Jean Reno as Georges Thenault: The commander of the Lafayette Escadrille
- Jennifer Decker as Lucienne: A French girl who lives with her orphan nephews and niece. Rawlings' love interest.
- Abdul Salis as Eugene Skinner: An African-American boxer, who has been accepted as an athlete in France, and is motivated to "pay back" his adopted country. Skinner is based on Eugene Bullard, the first African-American military pilot.
- Philip Winchester as William Jensen: An American man from Lincoln, Nebraska. Coming from a military family, he tries his best to make his family proud.
- Tyler Labine as Briggs Lowry: A dilettante who joins the army because of his overbearing father.
- David Ellison as Eddie Beagle: A petty thief who joined up in hopes of evading repercussions.
- Tim Pigott-Smith as Mr. Lowry: Briggs' overbearing father.
- Gunnar Winbergh as "The Black Falcon": A ruthless German Captain Ace pilot and Cassidy's nemesis.

== Production ==
In writing the original drafts that formed the basis of the final screenplay, Tony Bill made an effort to incorporate the real-life adventures of a number of American World War I expatriates who served in both the Lafayette Escadrille and the Lafayette Flying Corps, although pseudonyms were used throughout.

The casting of Franco in an action feature at the time was considered a "stepping stone" to his rise as marquee player and movie star.

The film was shot on location in the United Kingdom primarily in Spring 2005, although principal photography continued on into the summer. The trench scenes were shot in Hatfield, Hertfordshire, the same location used for Band of Brothers and Saving Private Ryan. The airfield and aerial shots were filmed on and above RAF Halton (near Aylesbury) where hangars, mess rooms, and officers quarters were built adjacent to Splash Covert Woods. All scenery and props were removed when filming ended. Some exterior shots were filmed on location at Copped Hall. The interior shots of the chateau were filmed at RAF Halton's officers' mess, Halton House. Some interiors and studio green-screen work were filmed at Elstree Film and Television Studios in Borehamwood, Hertfordshire.

The film was privately financed outside the standard Hollywood studio circuit by a group of filmmakers and investors, including producer Dean Devlin and pilot David Ellison, son of Oracle Corp. founder Larry Ellison; they spent more than $60 million of their own money to make and market Flyboys.

The Nieuport 17s featured in the film included four replicas built by Airdrome Aeroplanes, an aircraft company based outside of Kansas City, Missouri. The other aircraft used were a mix of authentic aircraft (the Nieuport 17 that Franco used throughout filming was an original combat aircraft from Kermit Weeks' collection in Florida, specially brought over for the film) and replicas including Nieuport 17s, a sole Sopwith 1 1/2 Strutter and a number of Fokker Dr.I replicas.

In preparing for the starring role, Franco took flying lessons. All the other main actors, except Jean Reno, were filmed in actual aircraft in anticipation of using the aerial footage in final scenes. (Reno pointedly refused the offer, with a "No thanks, I'm afraid of flying." admission). Very little other than Franco's closeups in a cockpit ultimately made it to the screen.

== Historical accuracy ==
Flyboys has been widely criticized for its lack of historical accuracy. The most serious lapse was the blending of the Lafayette Escadrille with the Lafayette Flying Corps, a sub-unit where the real-life Eugene Bullard actually served.

Various details of World War I fighter aircraft technology shown in the film were inaccurate. For example, the aircraft engines in the CGI scenes are pictured as not moving. On the rotary engines used in some early aircraft, the engine case and cylinders rotated, with the crankshaft bolted to the airframe. The spinning of the cylinders improved cooling and allowed for fewer parts, making the engine simpler and lighter. The propeller was attached to the crankcase (the opposite of radial engines). One operating rotary engine appears in a scene that takes place in the repair hangar. The Nieuport and Fokker aircraft used in the movie are flying replicas built with new radial engines, due to the unavailability of original-type rotary engines. This detail can be briefly seen in the final combat when the black Fokker is taking off after Rawling's ground attack at the German airfield.

In the scene where Beagle is rescued, some of the German soldiers in the trench were shown wearing the Pickelhaube. By 1916, the helmet was no longer in use by frontline soldiers. It had been replaced with the Stahlhelm, which significantly reduced the number of head injuries suffered by German soldiers.

In many scenes with Lucienne, Rawling's aircraft has a British roundel rather than a French one, which have red at the outer border.

Another error is that the American pilots are operating the Nieuport 17, while the Germans are operating the Fokker Dr.I, which entered front line service some time after the Nieuport 17 was no longer operational.

The singular use of Fokker Triplanes, which were not in widespread operational use, is contentious and almost every Triplane was also painted red in the film, indicating that the Triplane was in Jasta 11, the "all-red" unit. Despite this the remaining pre-production aircraft, designated Dr.I, were delivered to Jasta 11 and Idflieg issued a production order for 100 triplanes in September, followed by an order for 200 in November 1917. On the director/producer commentary track for the DVD release, Producer Dean Devlin noted that they were aware the predominant use of red triplanes was historically inaccurate, but wanted to give clear visual signals to the audience to enable them to easily distinguish friend from foe in the aerial sequences.

The film's only military adviser for the entire project was Jack Livesey, a convicted defrauder who fabricated his résumé and military service to gain employment as an administrative assistant at the Imperial War Museum, London. Livesey was charged and convicted with fraudulently claiming £30,000.00 in benefits. Livesey had served three years in the British Army Catering Corps. His claims of service in Northern Ireland, the Falklands conflict and that he was a curator of The Imperial War Museum were not true.

In the film, the RMS Aquitania is depicted as a luxury liner; however, in early 1914, she was converted to use as an armed merchant cruiser, and by 1915 had been put into use as a troop transport ship, painted with dazzle style camouflage; however, the film might have used it to demonstrate the style of transport ships during the war.

== Release ==
=== Critical reception ===
Review aggregator website Rotten Tomatoes reports an approval rating of 34% based on 128 reviews, with an average rating of 4.9/10. The site's critics' consensus reads: "A poorly scripted history-rewriting exercise with mediocre acting and unconvincing CGI battle scenes." On Metacritic, the film has a weighted average score of 47 out of 100 based on 22 critics, indicating "mixed or average" reviews. Audiences polled by CinemaScore gave the film an average grade of "B+" on an A+ to F scale.

=== Box office ===
The film opened at #4 at the domestic box office, grossing $6 million from 2,033 theaters, an average of $2,953 per auditorium. The film then dropped 61% in its second weekend. Flyboys ended up with a total domestic gross of $13.1 million, as well as $4.7 million internationally, for a total worldwide gross of $17.8 million. Variety named it one of the 10 biggest box office flops of the year.

== See also ==
- The Legion of the Condemned (1928)
- Lafayette Escadrille (1958)

== Bibliography ==
- Farmer, Jim. "The Making of Flyboys". Air Classics, Vol. 42, No. 11, November 2006.
- Winchester, Jim, ed. "Fokker DR.1: JG 1". Biplanes, Triplanes and Seaplanes (Aviation Factfile). London: Grange Books plc, 2004. ISBN 1840136413.
