= Why I Wore Lipstick to My Mastectomy =

2006 television film

- Australian DVD cover
- Genre: Biography; Comedy-drama
- Based on: Why I Wore Lipstick to My Mastectomy by Geralyn Lucas
- Written by: Nancey Silvers
- Directed by: Peter Werner
- Starring: Sarah Chalke; Jay Harrington; Patti LaBelle
- Music by: Ernest Troost
- Country of origin: United States
- Original language: English

Production
- Executive producers: Robert Green; Jack Grossbart; Linda L. Kent
- Producer: Terry Gould
- Cinematography: Neil Roach
- Editor: David Beatty
- Running time: 120 minutes
- Production company: Grossbart Kent Productions

Original release
- Network: Lifetime
- Release: October 23, 2006

Why I Wore Lipstick to My Mastectomy (known as Lipstick in some countries) is a 2006 American biographical comedy-drama television film directed by Peter Werner and written by Nancey Silvers. Based on the 2004 memoir by Geralyn Lucas, it stars Sarah Chalke as Lucas, who was diagnosed with breast cancer at age 27. Jay Harrington and Patti LaBelle also star. It aired on Lifetime on October 23, 2006.

== Plot ==
Shortly after graduating from Columbia University's Graduate School of Journalism, Geralyn Lucas lands her dream job working for 20/20. Lucas is then diagnosed with breast cancer at the age of 27 and has a dilemma — whether to have a lumpectomy or the potentially safer mastectomy. After consulting several doctors (including her husband) and researching the operations she decides to undergo a mastectomy. Her subsequent chemotherapy treatment leads to tensions within her marriage but the couple stays together. She also has breast reconstruction. The final shot is of Geralyn cradling her child, something she feared she would be unable to do. Geralyn meets several "angels" in the story, people who have been in similar positions to her and are able to dispense good advice.

The title refers to her belief that only confident women wear red lipstick.

== Cast ==
- Sarah Chalke as Geralyn Lucas
- Jay Harrington as Tyler Lucas
- Lally Cadeau as Geralyn's Mother
- Harvey Atkins as Geralyn's Father
- Robin Brule as Wendy
- Mayko Nguyen as Donna
- Julie Kahner as Meredith
- Patti LaBelle as Moneisha
- Conrad Pla as Cuban Taxi Driver
- Geoffrey Pounsett as Dr. Bob Bradley
- Jordan Baker as Adam
- Andrew Gillies as Victor
- Yanna MacIntosh as Dr. Crone
- Janet Lo as Mammogram Nurse
- Elizabeth Saunders as Dr. Meadows
- John Bourgeois as Dr. Frank
- Ron Lea as Dr. Keel
- Laurie Elliott as Woman With New Breasts
- Marcia Diamond as Mrs. Jackson
- Dwight McFee as Newsstand Guy
- Nicky Guadagni as The Photographer
- Dax Ravina as Tattoo Artist
- Lisa Merchant as Chemo Nurse
- Kim Roberts as Operating Room Nurse
