= Jack Hourigan =

American actress (born 1968)

- Born: Jacqueline Hourigan; August 14, 1968 (age 57); Burlington, Ontario, Canada
- Occupations: Actress, playwright

Jack Hourigan (born August 14, 1968, in Burlington, Ontario, Canada) is a playwright, actress, and co-host of the show How to Boil Water on the Food Network with Tyler Florence. Prior to that experience, she was an original cast member of Second City Cleveland.

== Filmography ==
- (2004) Christmas at Maxwell's
- (2003) American Splendor
- (2003) The Line of Masculinity
- (2010) Unnatural History
