= Geralyn Lucas =

American journalist

Geralyn Lucas (born 1967), is an American journalist, television producer, writer and public speaker for breast cancer awareness.

== Career ==
Lucas graduated from Columbia University School of Journalism. After graduation, she went to work at ABC and was an editorial producer at the ABC News newsmagazine 20/20 for seven years. Lucas used to be an executive director of public affairs/programming at the Lifetime Television cable network.

== Illness ==
Lucas was 27 years old and working at the 20/20 television show when she discovered a lump in her breast that was diagnosed as breast cancer. As a result of the diagnosis, Lucas had a mastectomy. Lucas subsequently wrote a book, "Why I Wore Lipstick to My Mastectomy," which talked about her experience and discussed her attitude about overcoming the challenges of breast cancer. The book was made into an Emmy nominated movie that premiered on Lifetime television starring Sarah Chalke and Patti LaBelle in October 2006. The theme song "I am not my hair" for the movie was written by Pink and India.Arie. Lucas has become an activist, informing women about breast cancer, and early detection. She created a YouTube video to inform women about early detection.

== Family ==
Geralyn is married to Tyler Lucas. Tyler Lucas works as an orthopedic surgeon at Metropolitan Hospital. They have two children. They live in New York City.
