= Celle-Lévescault =

- Commune
- Coat of arms
- Location of Celle-Lévescault
- Location within France Location within Nouvelle-Aquitaine
- Coordinates: 46°25′28″N 0°11′18″E
- Country: France
- Region: Nouvelle-Aquitaine
- Department: Vienne
- Arrondissement: Poitiers
- Canton: Lusignan
- Intercommunality: CU Grand Poitiers

Government
  - Mayor (2020–2026): Frédéric Leonet
- Area^{1}: 42.67 km^{2} (16.47 sq mi)
- Highest elevation: 159 m (522 ft)
- Lowest elevation: 90 m (300 ft)
- Population (2023): 1,383
  - Density: 32.41/km^{2} (83.95/sq mi)
- Time zone: UTC+01:00 (CET)
  - Summer (DST): UTC+02:00 (CEST)
- INSEE/Postal code: 86045 /86600
- ^{1} French Land Register data, which excludes lakes, ponds, glaciers > 1 km^{2} (0.386 sq mi or 247 acres) and river estuaries.

Celle-Lévescault (French pronunciation: [sɛl levɛsko]) is a commune in the Vienne department in the Nouvelle-Aquitaine region in western France.

== See also ==
- Communes of the Vienne department
