= Christmas at Maxwell's =

- Promotional poster
- Directed by: William C. Laufer
- Written by: William C. Laufer
- Produced by: William C. Laufer; Tiffany Laufer
- Starring: Andrew May; Jack Hourigan; Helen Welch
- Cinematography: Tiffany Laufer
- Edited by: Ronen Pestes
- Music by: Richard John Baker; Mike Petrone
- Production company: Laufer Film Company
- Distributed by: Aloha Releasing Inc. Laufer Film Company; Virtual Film Distribution
- Release date: December 6, 2006
- Running time: 94 minutes
- Country: United States
- Language: English
- Budget: US$3,000,000

Christmas at Maxwell's is a 2006 American independent drama film written and directed by William C. Laufer, and starring Andrew May and Jacqueline 'Jack' Hourigan.

== Plot ==
Suzie Austin (Jack Hourigan) has cancer and her most recent prognosis is unfavorable. Fearing that this may be their last Christmas together, husband Andrew Austin (Andrew May) takes Suzie and their two children, Chris (Charlie May) and Mary (Julia May) to the family's summer home on Lake Erie to celebrate the holiday. There they meet Gus (Angus May). Andrew comes to terms with his past as the family deals with his wife's failing health.

== Background ==
The film is based upon Laufer's real-life experiences and was shot on locations in Ohio. Laufer's daughter, Tiffany Laufer, an American Film Institute Alumna, served as cinematographer and co-producer. An advance screening was held on November 28, 2006, with all ticket proceeds going to the American Cancer Society. The film had its official theatrical release on December 1, 2006, and its television debut on Christmas Day.

== Partial cast ==
- Andrew May as Andrew Austin
- Jack Hourigan as Suzie Austin
- Helen Welch as Rachel Henderson
- Rick Montgomery Jr. as Dr. Callahan
- Tracie Field as Tootsie
- Robert Hawkes as Col. Pickerling
- Angus May as Uncle Gus
- Charlie May as Chris Austin
- Julia May as Mary Austin
- William C. Laufer as Fr. Johnston

== Reception ==
Belinda Elliott of CBN wrote that even with its low budget, the film was "beautifully photographed with rich warming images of Christmas", but cautioned that themes of illness and death might be too heavy for young children. She summarized that the film was a "heartwarming holiday tale that lovingly illustrates the power of faith and the fact that miracles can and do still happen." East Valley Living reports that the film had received an award from the Dove Foundation.

In 2010 Trinity Broadcasting Network (TBN) picked up the movie for a worldwide TV release.

== See also ==
- List of Christmas films
