= How to Boil Water =

- Genre: Cooking show
- Presented by: Emeril Lagasse (1993–1995); Cathy Lowe (1995–2000); Sean Donnellan (1995–2000); Frédéric Van Coppernolle (2000–2003); Tyler Florence (2003–); Jack Hourigan (2003–)
- Country of origin: United States
- Original language: English

Production
- Running time: 30 minutes

Original release
- Network: Food Network
- Release: 1993

How to Boil Water is an American television program. One of the first shows on the Food Network, it began broadcasting in 1993 and was first hosted by Emeril Lagasse. The focus of the show is simple cooking, as the show's title suggests, and is directed at those who have little cooking skill or experience.

In the beginning of the history of Food Network, How to Boil Water was the trademark show of the network. As Emeril's personal popularity grew, he eventually moved on to his own show, Essence of Emeril. How to Boil Water continued with the tandem chefs Cathy Lowe and Sean Donnellan. With this duo, the show followed the formula of a chef teaching somebody with no experience.

After Lowe and Donnellan, Frédéric Van Coppernolle along with comedian Lynne Koplitz, and then later Jack Hourigan, were the show's hosts. This version of the show followed a formula similar to when Emeril hosted. It later returned to the chef-and-student model with chef Tyler Florence and Jack continuing as co-host.
