= LeeAnne Locken =

American television personality

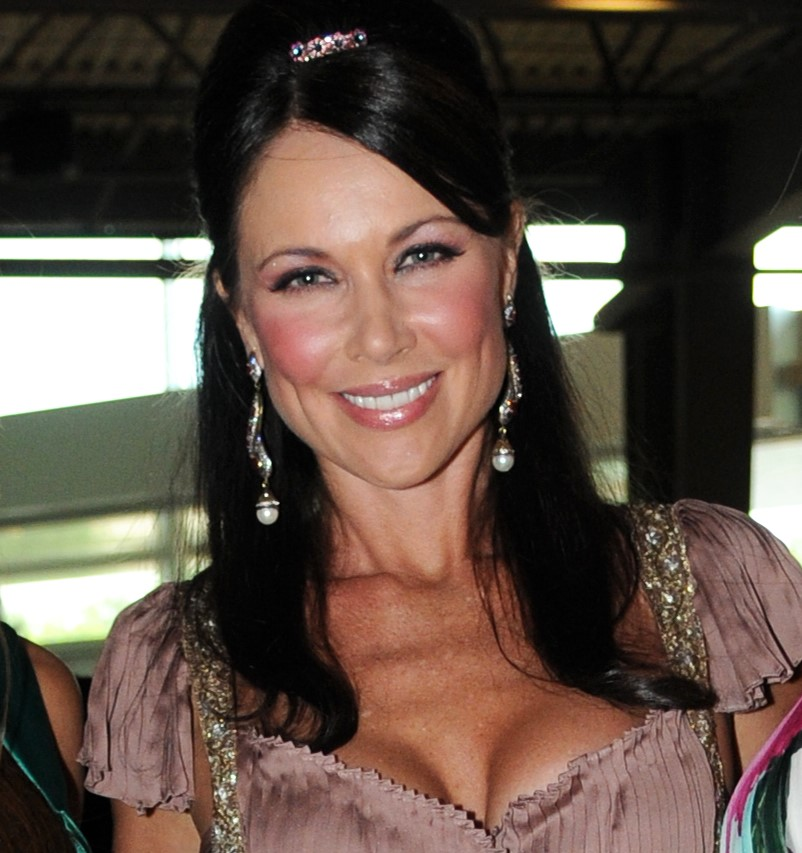
- Locken in 2011
- Born: June 7, 1967 (age 59); Pasadena, Texas, U.S.
- Education: The University of Houston
- Occupations: Actress; philanthropist; television personality; model; author
- Spouse: Rich Emberlin (m. 2019)
- Beauty pageant titleholder
- Title: Miss Arizona USA 1989
- Years active: 1986–present
- Major competitions: Miss Texas USA 1988 (2nd runner-up); Miss Arizona USA 1989 (winner); Miss USA 1989 (top 10)
- Website: leeannelocken.com

LeeAnne Locken (born June 7, 1967) is an American actress, philanthropist, TV host, model, author and beauty pageant titleholder. She first rose to prominence after winning the Miss Arizona USA 1989 pageant, and regularly appeared in the reality television series Big Rich Texas and The Real Housewives of Dallas.

Locken began her career as an actress, appearing in films such as Vasectomy: A Delicate Matter (1986) and My Best Friend Is a Vampire (1987). She subsequently competed in the Miss Texas USA 1988 pageant, coming second; and went on to win the Miss Arizona USA contest the following year, placing in the top ten at the Miss USA 1989 pageant. She continued to work as an actor, appearing in films and television shows including Sons of Thunder (1999), Miss Congeniality (2000), Walker, Texas Ranger (2001) and Beyond the Farthest Star (2015).

In 2009, Locken made her reality television debut, starring in She's Got the Look, in which she came third in the show's second season. She was introduced as a board member and representative for the charity The Fashionistas, in Esquire Network's series Big Rich Texas in 2012. She left the show after two seasons in 2013. From 2016 until 2020, she was a main cast member in Bravo's The Real Housewives of Dallas since the series premiere, leaving the show after its fourth season. Locken has published two books and shown her continuous involvement in her philanthropic activities for several charities.

== Early life and education ==
Locken was raised by her grandparents from the age of three years old. She was introduced to the carnival world at a young age and began her first job as a carnival worker when she was just a child. She graduated from J. Frank Dobie High School in 1985 and attended The University of Houston.

== Career ==
=== Film and television ===
==== Acting ====
Locken has had roles in television programs including: Sons of Thunder, Walker, Texas Ranger, Inspector Mom, Chase, GCB and Ex-Housewife. She has also appeared on the covers of Gladys, People, Restyled and OTS Magazine. Additionally, Locken has appeared in several films: Vasectomy: A Delicate Matter (1986), My Best Friend Is a Vampire (1987), The Only Thrill (1997), Broken Vessels (1999), Miss Congeniality (2000), Rain (2006), Chariot (2013), Pros and Cons: A Fantasy Football Movie (2013), Beyond the Farthest Star (2015) and Carter High (2015).

==== Reality television ====
In 2009, Locken joined the season two cast of TV Land's She's Got the Look. She made a guest appearance in Most Eligible Dallas for its first season in 2011. In 2012, Locken was added to the cast of Big Rich Texas for its second season in a recurring capacity as a representative for the charity The Fashionistas, along with the charity's founder, Heidi Dillon. Both left after the show's third season in 2013.

It was announced on November 15, 2015, that Bravo was expanding The Real Housewives franchise to Dallas, Texas; with Locken joining the cast of The Real Housewives of Dallas, alongside Cary Deuber, Tiffany Hendra, Stephanie Hollman and Brandi Redmond. The first season premiered on April 11, 2016. After four years on the show, Locken was fired from the series on February 25, 2020, ahead of the show's fifth season after making racist comments about Kary Brittingham . The show was later put on an indefinite hiatus after five seasons. She has also made numerous appearances on Watch What Happens Live! with Andy Cohen throughout her time as a housewife.

=== Modeling and pageants ===
Locken began modeling at the age of 19 and subsequently entered the Miss Texas USA beauty pageant in 1988, placing third. At age 22, Locken won Miss Arizona USA 1989 and went on to compete in the Miss USA 1989 pageant, placing in the top 10. Locken continued her modeling career into the 1990s and early 2000s, and shot campaigns alongside fellow model Hendra.

=== Philanthropy ===
Locken has been a pivotal part of The Fashionistas, DIFFA: Design Industries Foundation Fighting AIDS, Fashion Group International, AIDS Services of Dallas, Dallas Challenge and Housing Crisis Center charities; hosting galas, raising money and increasing awareness for each of the charity's causes. As of current, she serves as the vice president of The Fashionistas and is a board member of Housing Crisis Center. She has previously been the honorary chair for AIDS Services of Dallas' "No Tie Dinner" gala and co-chair of Dallas Challenge's "Art From the Heart" event. She has also made numerous speeches at women's empowerment exhibitions, sharing her own experiences of domestic violence.

=== Authoring ===
On November 5, 2012, Locken published a book titled What's Your Status?: Finding Your Way to a More Positive Life One Day at a Time!, which is described as "a collection of daily posts designed to motivate, inspire and encourage others to be their best and live a more positive life one post at a time". On August 1, 2018, Locken released Color Me Crazy: Adult Coloring Book, with the front cover resembling her confessional interview moment from the second season of The Real Housewives of Dallas where she and her dog wore matching hotdog costumes. The book was featured on the show's third season.

== Personal life ==
Locken began working in the carnival scene at three years old and left once she was able to buy rides at the carnival at the age of sixteen. As a self-described "carny kid", she was exposed to environments involving domestic abuse and drugs at a young age. She has been very vocal regarding her struggle with mental health problems including depression and low self-esteem. She has also discussed her suicidal past, revealing she now advocates for people who have dealt with similar situations as herself.

In April 2019, Locken married law enforcement veteran Rich Emberlin, which was featured on The Real Housewives of Dallas for its fourth season.

== Filmography ==
=== Film ===
Year	Title	Role	Notes
1986	Vasectomy: A Delicate Matter	Beauty Pageant Contestant	
1987	My Best Friend Is a Vampire	Candy Andrews	
1997	The Only Thrill	Girl by the Pool	
1999	Broken Vessels	Grandmother	
2000	Miss Congeniality	Miss Nebraska	
2003	12 Hot Women	Agent December	Short
2006	Rain	Megan Randolph	
2006	Catching In	Woman in Cemetery	Video
2012	Watershed	Jenny	Short
2013	Chariot	News Anchor	
2013	Pros and Cons: A Fantasy Football Movie	Studio Reporter	
2013	Lucky Red	Jogger	Short
2015	Beyond the Farthest Star	Candace Cutter	
2015	Carter High	Reporter No. 3	

=== Television ===
Year	Title	Role	Notes
1989	Miss USA 1989	Herself	Beauty Pageant Competition
1999	Sons of Thunder	Young Woman	Episode: "Moment of Truth"
2001	Walker, Texas Ranger	Caprice	Episode: "Desperate Measures"
2006	Inspector Mom	Vanessa	Episode: "The Corpse's Costume"
2006	Firehouse Cooks	Herself/host	TV series
2006	Plano Wired	Herself/Anchor	TV series
2007–10	The Plano Experience	Herself/host	TV series
2009	She's Got the Look	Herself	Contestant: season 2
2011	Chase	Abby	Episode: "Father Figure"
2011	Most Eligible Dallas	Herself	Episode: "When Pigs Fly"
2011	Eye on Plano	Herself/Anchor	TV series
2011	It's Three O'clock Somewhere	Herself/host	Episode: "Episode #1.1"
2012	GCB	Jobeth Marie	Episode: "Pilot"
2012	Luxury Dallas	Herself/host	Host: Seasons 1–2
2012–13	Big Rich Texas	Herself	Recurring cast: Seasons 2–3
2013	Beautiful You HDTV	Herself/host	Episode: "Episode #1.1" & "Episode #1.2"
2014	The Starck Club	Herself	TV series
2016	Entertainment Tonight	Herself	Episode: "Episode #35.148"
2016	The Domenick Nati Show	Herself	Episode: "LeeAnne Locken"
2016–19	Watch What Happens Live with Andy Cohen	Herself	Guest: Seasons 13–16
2016–20	The Real Housewives of Dallas	Herself	Main cast: Seasons 1–4
2018	Glitterbomb	Herself	Episode: "Camila Banus/LeeAnne Locken/Patricia DeLeon"
2019	Ex-Housewife	Herself	Episode: "Episode #1.1"
2019	Don't Be Tardy	Herself	Episode: "Performance Anxiety"
2019	Celebrity Page	Herself	Episode: "Episode #5.38"
2019	The Real Housewives of Atlanta	Herself	Episode: "The Float Goes On" & "Love, Marriage, and Sour Peaches"
2020	Popternative	Herself	Episode: "LeeAnne Locken"

== See also ==
- The Real Housewives
- The Real Housewives of Dallas
