= The Real Housewives of Dallas season 1 =

First season of the reality television series The Real Housewives of Dallas

The Real Housewives of Dallas
- Season 1
- Cover used by iTunes (Left to right) Hendra, Hollman, Deuber, Redmond, and Locken
- Starring: Cary Deuber; Tiffany Hendra; Stephanie Hollman; LeeAnne Locken; Brandi Redmond
- No. of episodes: 11

Release
- Original network: Bravo
- Original release: April 11 – June 19, 2016

Season chronology
- Next → Season 2

The first season of The Real Housewives of Dallas, an American reality television series, was broadcast on Bravo. It aired from April 11, 2016 until June 19, 2016, and was primarily filmed in Dallas, Texas. Its executive producers are Adam Karpel, Andrew, John Paparazzo, Rich Bye, Samantha Billett and Andy Cohen.

The Real Housewives of Dallas focuses on the lives of Cary Deuber, Tiffany Hendra, Stephanie Hollman, LeeAnne Locken, and Brandi Redmond. It consisted of eleven episodes.

This season marked the only regular appearance of Tiffany Hendra.

== Production and crew ==
The Real Housewives of Dallas was announced on November 11, 2015. The reality series was initially titled Ladies of Dallas during its early production, before being announced as part of The Real Housewives franchise. Although it was announced as the ninth installment in The Real Housewives franchise in 2015, executive producer Andy Cohen revealed that the network had been toying with the idea of The Real Housewives of Dallas for seven years as well as casting there. Cohen went on to describe the first season of The Real Housewives of Dallas as a homage to the original series of the real housewives saying, "It reminds me of early Housewives. It's the way they communicate. It's about how they live their lives, and it's about families." The series was created as an extension to the franchise incorporating a "Southern twist." In the promotional footage for the series, Kenny Rogers' son, Ken Rogers, played the part of a voice over. A creative director revealed they auditioned several people for a voice that was "unique and deeply Texan."

The season premiered with "Everything's Bigger in Dallas" on April 11, 2016, while the tenth episode "Full Nelson" served as the season finale, and was aired on June 13, 2016. It was followed by a one-part reunion on June 19, 2016, which marked the conclusion of the season. Adam Karpel, Andrew, John Paparazzo, Rich Bye, Samantha Billett and Andy Cohen are recognized as the series' executive producers; it is produced and distributed by Goodbye Pictures.

== Cast ==
The first season of The Real Housewives of Dallas featured 5 women who the network described as "sophisticated southern socialites.' The cast of the series includes Cary Deuber, Tiffany Hendra, Stephanie Hollman, LeeAnne Locken, and Brandi Redmond.

After moving from Ohio, Deuber moved to Texas and began studying nursing and furthered her studies by earning her degree and becoming a CRNFA certified registered nurse first assistant. Deuber has furthered her passion of nursing by leading and join in on many missions to third world countries, focusing on pediatric surgeries. In Dallas, Deuber works alongside her husband Mark, who is a plastic surgeon. She works as an operative assistant, however she still maintains her own aesthetic injectable practice. Away from work, Deuber devotes her time to her newborn and her two step-children. Debuer is described as someone who has "a dry sense of humor with an air of confidence and a heart of gold."

Hendra, an Asian-American spitfire, was born and raised in Texas but move to Los Angeles to pursue her career in entertainment. Hendra worked in Los Angeles for over 15 as an actress, TV host and model after studying under Ivana Chubbuck. Hendra accolades include Beat The Geeks, Spy TV, Primetime Glick, Walker Texas Ranger 3: Deadly Reunion and the Cinemax erotic-drama series Black Tie Nights. Hendra has recently moved back to her home of Texan, with her Australian, musician husband, Aaron Hendra. Hendra navigates life back in Texas as she is supported by her friend of many decades, Locken. Since the Hendra are unable to conceive children of their own, the couple focus of giving back to children who are less fortunate through organizations such as Angels of East Africa. Hendra continue to pursue her passion of entertainment through her blog and web series, Sanctuary Of Style, where she focuses fashion, beauty and spirituality.

Hollman was born and raised in a small town in Oklahoma. Being a daughter of a social worker, Hollman was raised to have a caring heart which lead her to receiving a degree in Psychology at Ohio State University. With her degree, Hollman went on to work as a social worker at Head Start and the Madonna House Shelter. Since moving to Dallas, Hollman has worked for The Big Brother and Big Sister organization for nine years, as well as being the co-chair for Texas Trailblazer Awards Luncheon in 2014, which benefits The Family Place. When Hollman isn't devoting her time to helping others, she dedicated her some to her husband, Travis, and his list of chores that he frequently leaves her. The couple have two sons together; 7-year-old Chance and 5-year-old Cruz. Hollman is described "the girl next door," but when push comes to shove she's not afraid to speak her mind.

Locken found success on the carnival circuit around the age of three, soon after her mother married in to the carnival lifestyle. She began working on the carnival at 3-years-old and by the time she was 11, she had own her own game which she ran by herself. By the time she was 16, Locken had owned 8 games in total which she hired people to run, and retired from the carnival lifestyle. Although Locken made succeed in making money, she has claimed it was rough time as she was beat and stalked throughout her time on the carnival. After her carnival year, Locken went on to place in the top ten off Miss USA 1989 as Miss Arizona. He pageant career became valuable experience when she auditioned and won the role of Miss Nebraska in Miss Congeniality, alongside Sandra Bullock. Locken has gone on to work in multiple movie and television series such as Rain, GCB and Chase. Locken is also no stranger to reality television with appearing on She's Got the Look and Big Rich Texas. When Locken isn't working she devotes her time to giving back and cementing her place in the charity society of Dallas, Locken works with multiple charities and organizations including Legacy Counseling, SPCA of Texas, THE FASHIONISTAS, Aids Services Dallas and the Design Industries Foundation Fighting Aids. She lives with her boyfriend, Rich Emberlin, who works for the Dallas Police Department. Locken is described to have an "exuberant personality."

Redmond who has lived in Texas for 25-years, is a former Dallas Cowboys Cheerleader. Being a Dallas Cowboys Cheerleader allowed Redmond to travel the world to places such as Afghanistan, Iraq, Kuwait, Japan and around Europe. Since living in Texas, Redmond has studied and graduated from Texas Woman's University. Since Redmond husband Bryan often travels, Redmond focuses her time looking after her children as well as dedicating herself to many charities and organizations. Redmond has support many charities which includes Folds of Honor, Krewe De Etoiles benefiting Operation Smile, and The Community Partners of Dallas. She is described as fun-loving and enthusiastic, however she isn't afraid to speak her mind.

Along with the five full-time cast members, the first season of The Real Housewives of Dallas also includes recurring cast-member, Marie Reyes. Reyes is a registered nurse, who graduated with a bachelor's degree in nursing in 1992. Reyes is a certified botox injectionist, in which she owns and operates two clinics of SkinSpaMED, as well as previously working as a national injection trainer for Medicis Aesthetics as sitting on the Expert Injector Advisory Board for Galderma Aesthetics. She has gone on to launch her own luxury skincare line, RAGS II Riches. Reyes is happily married to her husband, Angel, who she met online. When Reyes isn't working or raising her children, she devotes her time to charity, such charities and organizations include AIDS Services Dallas, The Leukemia and Lymphoma Society and Women's Council for the Dallas Arboretum. Although Reyes is described as easy-going, she often finds herself in the middle of the drama in Dallas.

== Synopsis ==
The first season of The Real Housewives of Dallas begins with Cary Deuber hosting a benefit at her home, but Brandi Redmond and Stephanie Hollman's behavior comes under fire as "inappropriate" by LeeAnne Locken. Tension begins to rise between Redmond and Locken and later at a charity event, Hollman is pulled in to the feud between the two ladies. Locken's friend, Tiffany Hendra, has recently moved back to Dallas with her husband Aaron, but she is left questioning if it was the right decision.

Deuber is pulled in to the feud between Redmond and Locken, after Redmond's stunt at the Mad Hatter's Tea Party, an exclusive event in Dallas. She later open up her closet for Hendra's online series, but her husband Mark takes control displaying his love of fashion. Later, she attends a lunch with Hollman and Locken, where her and Hollman are confronted about their friendship with Redmond. Deuber bonds with Hendra in an attempt to build a friendship. Cary poses for the risqué photos for her and her husband's website. Deuber finds herself questioning Locken and her motives after the events at a Gothic-themed party. In Austin, Deuber confronts Locken on her behavior to the other women after an explosive argument with Reyes. Deuber and her husband endeavor in achieving their dreams of a home in Switzerland. Later, Deuber continues to fight with Locken at Hollman's party. The feud between the two worsen at the reunion when the Deubers confront Locken on the rumors she has been spreading.

Hendra and her husband begin to adjust to Dallas, and go house hunting, however Aaron's doubts on Dallas surface. Hendra pursue her passion with her online series, Sanctuary Of Style, with the help of Deuber. Hendra attends yoga with Deuber to build a new friendship. Later at Reyes' cocktail party, Hendra attempts to create peace between Redmond and Locken backfire when the two end up in argument. Hendra's failed attempts to reconcile leave Locken and herself in an explosive, public argument. Hendra learns of Reyes talking about Locken, and shares the information to Locken and the pair confront Reyes on the rumors she has been spreading. Hendra attempts to put her foot on the charity scene in Dallas, by hosting a charity concert feature her rockstar husband, at the House of Blues. Hendra continue to pursue settling down in Dallas, and after a new lead in a home she attempts to convince her husband on Dallas.

Hollman, along with Deuber find themselves in the middle of the feud between Locken and Redmond. Hollman attends a lunch with Deuber and Locken, where her and Hollman are confronted about their friendship with Redmond. Hollman takes a trip to Coweta, Oklahoma with Redmond and their kids to Oklahoma, to visit Hollman's parents. Hollman receive some expensive jewelry from her husband, Travis, for their 7-year wedding anniversary. Hollman decides to redecorate her son's room, however finds herself juggling the duties of decorating and her husband's micro-managing. Hollman meets up with Locken to reconcile their differences. Hollman struggles with her husband's micro-managing when he attempts to take control of his own surprise-birthday planning. Hollman hosts her annual Byron Nelson party, an event that consists in all-day drinking held in her back-yard at the Four Seasons Resort. The party is soon derailed by the feud between Locken and Deuber.

Locken has an extravagant hate designed for the Mad Hatter's Tea Party, at the event she is offended by Redmond's hat that is designed to look like poo. Locken confront Hollman and Deuber on Redmond's behavior at the Mad Hatter's Tea Party. During a cocktail party at Reyes' home, Reyes reveals an embarrassing secret about Locken. At the same party, Locken find herself arguing with Redmond again. After Hendra's failed attempt, Locken finds herself in an explosive argument with Hendra in public, resulting in Locken pushing the cameras and Hendra pushing Locken. Locken learns of Reyes revealing her secret, and her and Hendra visit Reyes at her home to confront her on the gossip she has been spreading. After hearing of Redmond's recent news, Locken attempts to move past their difference. Locken later acts as the keynote speaker for an event for to support women with HIV. During the trip in Austin, Locken learns that everyone knows of the secret that Reyes has shared. During heated night, Locken confronts Reyes and the next morning is confront by Deuber and Hollman on her behavior the night before. After being the keynote speaker, Locken explores the possibilities as a career of being a public speaker. At Hollman's party, Locken finds herself clashing with Deuber again. At the reunion, Locken finds herself in a heated argument with Deuber and her husband after they confront her on the alleged rumors she has been spreading.

Redmond struggles with the distance from her husband due to him travelling for business, and she begins to plan birthday celebration for her mother. Redmond attends the Mad Hatter's Tea Party with a shocking hat that leaves Locken and Hendra feeling insulted. Redmond, along with Hollman and Deuber visit a strip-club, but she later faces the consequences when her husband learns about their trip. After the drama with her husband, Redmond faces the truth about her grandfather when her mother reveals a secret, leaving Redmond questioning what she knows about her family. Despite Hendra's attempts of a reconciliation, Redmond and Locken end up fighting at Reyes' party. Redmond continues to struggle with her husband's distance after he arrives late and drunk to a party she is hosting for her estranged grandfather. She later attempts to confront him on the matter in hopes for a resolution. Redmond receives some heartbreaking news about her brother. Redmond meets with Locken and the pair attempt to move forward. Later at Travis' birthday party, Redmond invites all the ladies to a weekend gateway in Austin. During the reunion, Redmond reveals the separation between her and her husband.

== Episodes ==
The Real Housewives of Dallas season 1 episodes
No. overall	No. in season	Title	Original release date	US viewers (millions)
1	1	"Everything's Bigger in Dallas"	April 11, 2016	1.07
During a benefit Cary is hosting at her home, Brandi's behaviour becomes the topic on question by LeeAnne. Tensions rise between Brandi and LeeAnne, at a charity event, as Stephanie is pulled in to the drama. Tiffany begins to question her move back to Dallas.
2	2	"Mad as a Hatter"	April 18, 2016	0.92
LeeAnne organizes her hat for one of the most popular events in Dallas - the Mad Hatter's Tea Party. Brandi hosts a birthday party for her Mother, which brings out her concerns on her husband's constant travelling. Tiffany and her husband discuss their reservation on moving to Dallas whilst looking for a new home. Later, the issue between Brandi and LeeAnne worsens as Cary and Stephanie are dragged further into it due to Brandi's surprise at the Mad Hatter's Tea Party
3	3	"Making Frenemies"	April 25, 2016	0.82
Cary agrees to be a part of Tiffany's web series, Sanctuary of Style, but not all goes to plan when Cary's husband gets involved. Whilst Brandi is dealing with the fallout with her husband over attending a strip club, LeeAnne meets Cary and Stephanie for lunch to discuss Brandi's behavior.
4	4	"Mouth of the South"	May 2, 2016	0.83
Brandi and Stephanie take a road trip to Oklahoma to visit Stephanie's parents. In Dallas, Cary and Tiffany attend yoga together in hope of building a friendship. During a cocktail party, hosted by Maria, an embarrassing secret about LeeAnne becomes the topic of conversation. The issue between Brandi and LeeAnne escalates.
5	5	"Guess Who's Coming to Dinner?"	May 9, 2016	0.78
Tiffany's attempt to be the mediator between LeeAnne and Brandi doesn't go to plan when it leads to Tiffany and LeeAnne clashing among themselves. Stephanie and Cary receive gifts from their husbands gust Brandi is shocked by her husband cancelling on an important family event.
6	6	"Locken Loaded"	May 16, 2016	0.88
Marie is confronted by Tiffany and LeeAnne after sharing an embarrassing secret of LeeAnne's. Stephanie gets creative by redecorating her son's room and Cary gets creative by being a use for her husband's photography for his website. Brandi and her husband come to odds as she comforts on him bailing on her family event.
7	7	"Black and Blues"	May 23, 2016	0.85
Tiffany hosts a musical charity event with her husband. Brandi receives some tragic news about her brother. LeeAnne and Stephanie attempt to mend the bridge but Cary's reservation of LeeAnne grow at a Gothic themed party.
8	8	"Hollman Holiday"	May 30, 2016	0.89
Stephanie attempts to plan a birthday party for her husband, but it doesn't go to plan with his micromanaging. LeeAnne and Brandi attempt to move past their tension, later LeeAnne invites Tiffany and Stephanie to a charity event for women with HIV where she is a speaker. Brandi invites everyone for a weekend trip, which leaves of the ladies confused.
9	9	"Killing Time in Austin"	June 6, 2016	0.94
All the ladies travel to Stephanie and Brandi's lake house in Austin for a weekend trip. The embarrassing secret about LeeAnne comes to light whilst on the trip, leaving LeeAnne questioning who she can trust. Later that night tensions come to blows, causing some of the ladies confronting LeeAnne in the morning on her behavior the night before.
10	10	"Full Nelson"	June 13, 2016	0.95
Stephanie hosts her annual event, the Byron Nelson party. Tiffany and her husband continue to pursue finding a home in Dallas, whilst Cary and her husband discuss houses in Switzerland. Stephanie's party doesn't go exactly to plan when drama arises between Cary and LeeAnne.
11	11	"Reunion"	June 19, 2016	0.84
The ladies of season one reunite to discuss some of the drama from the season, with Marie and Cary's husband joining throughout the episode.
