= Mouth of the South =

Mouth of the South may refer to:

- Martha Beall Mitchell (1918–1976), exposer of the Watergate scandal
- Jerry Clower (1926–1998), comedian in the country music industry
- Jimmy Hart (born 1944), professional wrestling manager
- Ted Turner (1938-2026), media mogul
- Rival Choir, a Christian metalcore band from Texas (formerly known as Mouth of the South)
- LeeAnne Locken, cast member of The Real Housewives of Dallas
- Paul Finebaum, American sports author, former columnist, and television-radio personality
