= Immaculate Infection =

"Immaculate Infection", a wry pun on Immaculate Conception, may refer to:

- A 2012 episode of the Big Rich Texas reality television series
- A song from the 2009 Trash Talk album Shame
