= Allison Haunss =

American news reporter

Allison Haunss is a reporter for the CW11, New York. She previously worked as an anchor at News 12 Connecticut.

== Nominations and awards ==
In 2004, Haunss received awards for 'Best Broadcast of the Year' and also 'Best Prepared Report - TV Feature of the Year' by the Connecticut Press Club for a segment titled "Grandma Guard".

In 2002, Haunss again received awards from the Connecticut Press Club, again for 'Best Broadcast of the Year' and also 'Best Special Reporting Series - TV Investigative' for two different reports.

Haunss was also nominated for a 2006 Emmy Award by the National Academy of Television Arts & Sciences-New York City in the category Historical/Cultural (news) for a piece she did for News 12 Connecticut entitled "Day Laborers" which aired on October 7, 2005.
