= Robert Verdi =

American TV personality and style expert (born 1968)

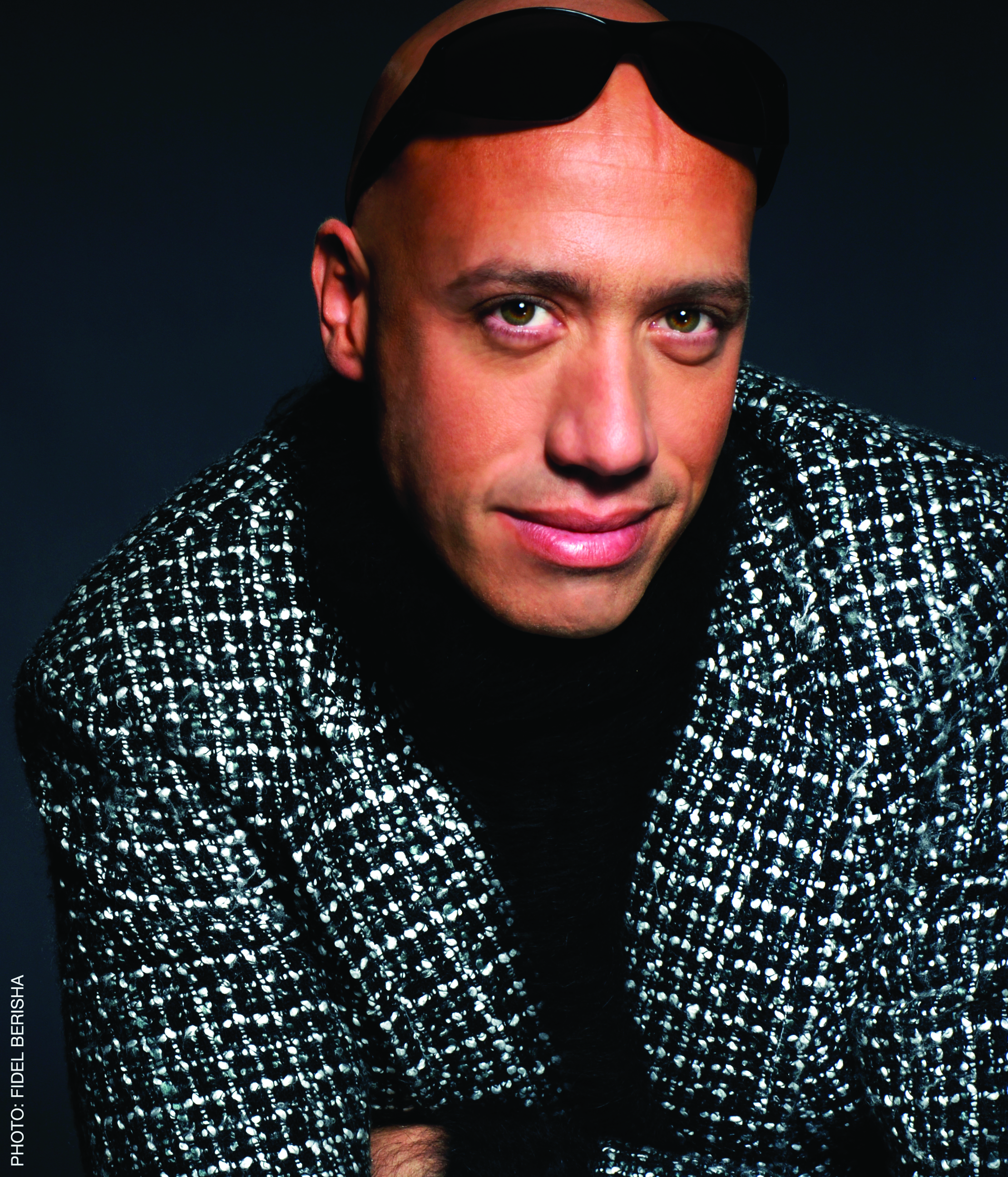
Robert Verdi; Entrepreneur and TV Host

Robert Verdi (born August 28, 1968) is an American entrepreneur and TV personality, specializing in fashion and home design. Verdi is known as the "friendly fashionista" and gained popularity hosting the home renovation hit series Surprise by Design and E! Fashion Police.

== Early life ==
Verdi was born and raised in suburban Maplewood, New Jersey, where he attended Columbia High School. His mother, a Portuguese immigrant, was a skilled dressmaker and his father was an acclaimed French chef. Verdi developed his sensibilities under his parents European rearing style. Verdi set out on a creative career and earned a degree in jewelry design from New York’s Fashion Institute of Technology. He had success with simultaneous jewelry showcases in Manhattan’s Barney’s, Bendel's, Bloomingdales and Bergdorf Goodman.

== Career ==
In the early 1990s, Verdi redirected his pursuits towards a career in television. Verdi joined Gay Entertainment Television, where he advanced his career.

A 1998 article in The New York Times is quoted as saying about Verdi, “In the style universe, where fashion, decorating, and the media are usually on different planets, Mr. Verdi travels comfortably between them. He is a jack-of-all-trades in a world where good taste and an instinct for the Now can be a passport across boundaries.” Verdi has worked with many celebrities. He also designed the New York apartments of Sandra Bernhard, Hugh Jackman, Mariska Hargitay and Bobby Flay.

In 2000, Verdi co-created and co-hosted Full Frontal Fashion on Metro TV. The show was the first live complete behind the scenes coverage of New York Fashion Week.

In 2002, Verdi began co-hosting Surprise by Design. On the show, Verdi or his co-host, Rebecca Cole, would redesign a room or exterior space at someone’s home in order to surprise a loved one. The homeowner would assist in the re-design, which would happen on a $2,500 budget, in one day, typically while their loved one was away at work. The show became the Discovery Channel’s highest rated daytime show.

Verdi hosted Fashion Police, a weekly series about celebrity fashion, when it was on the Style Network. He is frequently a guest on a variety of talk and news programs, such as The View, Live with Regis & Kelly, The Today Show and VH1’s The Fabulous Life Of. Additionally, Verdi is a stylist for Desperate Housewives star Eva Longoria, and has designed two of her Los Angeles, California homes. He was the designer for her July 7, 2007 wedding in Paris, France to basketball star Tony Parker.

Verdi has appeared since 2008 as a celebrity judge on the TV Land series, She's Got the Look where women over 35 compete for a modeling contract and magazine spread.

In 2010, Verdi starred in his self-titled show, The Robert Verdi Show, in which he styled celebrities and ran amok with bizarre ideas he threw at his crew of personal assistants. The show aired for one season on the LGBT TV channel Logo.

In February 2012, Verdi launched an affordable sunglasses collection under his name which sold exclusively on HSN.

In June 2015, Brides Gone Styled premiered on TLC, with Verdi and Gretta Monahan co-hosting.
