= List of The Real Housewives of Dallas episodes =

The Real Housewives of Dallas is an American reality television series that premiered April 11, 2016, on Bravo. The series chronicles the lives of nine women in and around Dallas over the course of five seasons, as they balance their personal and business lives, along with their social circle.

Cast members featured over the series' five season-run were: Cary Deuber (1–3), Tiffany Hendra (1), Stephanie Hollman (1–5), LeeAnne Locken (1–4), Brandi Redmond (1–5) and Kary Brittingham (4–5).

As of May 11, 2021, 78 original episodes of The Real Housewives of Dallas have aired over five seasons.

== Series overview ==
The Real Housewives of Dallas episodes
Season	Episodes	Originally released		Average Viewers
Season	Episodes	First released	Last released	Average Viewers
1	11	April 11, 2016	June 19, 2016	0.89
2	14	August 14, 2017	November 13, 2017	0.81
3	18	August 15, 2018	December 12, 2018	0.68
4	17	September 4, 2019	January 8, 2020	0.67
5	18	January 5, 2021	May 11, 2021	0.52

== Episodes ==
=== Season 1 (2016) ===
Cary Deuber, Tiffany Hendra, Stephanie Hollman, LeeAnne Locken and Brandi Redmond are introduced as series regulars. Marie Reyes served in a recurring capacity.

The Real Housewives of Dallas season 1 episodes
No. overall	No. in season	Title	Original release date	US viewers (millions)
1	1	"Everything's Bigger in Dallas"	April 11, 2016	1.07
2	2	"Mad as a Hatter"	April 18, 2016	0.92
3	3	"Making Frenemies"	April 25, 2016	0.82
4	4	"Mouth of the South"	May 2, 2016	0.83
5	5	"Guess Who's Coming to Dinner?"	May 9, 2016	0.78
6	6	"Locken Loaded"	May 16, 2016	0.88
7	7	"Black and Blues"	May 23, 2016	0.85
8	8	"Hollman Holiday"	May 30, 2016	0.89
9	9	"Killing Time in Austin"	June 6, 2016	0.94
10	10	"Full Nelson"	June 13, 2016	0.95
11	11	"Reunion"	June 19, 2016	0.84

=== Season 2 (2017) ===
Tiffany Hendra departed as a series regular. D'Andra Simmons and Kameron Westcott joined the cast.

The Real Housewives of Dallas season 2 episodes
No. overall	No. in season	Title	Original release date	U.S. viewers (millions)
12	1	"Look Who's Not Talking"	August 14, 2017	0.84
13	2	"Haute Dogs of Dallas"	August 21, 2017	0.69
14	3	"Face to Two Face"	August 28, 2017	0.80
15	4	"By Invitation Only"	September 4, 2017	0.85
16	5	"Walking in Memphis"	September 11, 2017	0.73
17	6	"Don't Cry Over Spilled Tea"	September 18, 2017	0.85
18	7	"Viva La Mexico"	September 25, 2017	0.83
19	8	"A Mouthful in Mexico"	October 2, 2017	0.80
20	9	"You’ve Yacht to be Kidding"	October 9, 2017	0.81
21	10	"Don't Cry Over Shattered Glass"	October 16, 2017	0.80
22	11	"Ladies Who Launch"	October 23, 2017	0.86
23	12	"The Beginning of the End"	October 30, 2017	0.80
24	13	"Reunion Part 1"	November 6, 2017	0.83
25	14	"Reunion Part 2"	November 13, 2017	0.89

=== Season 3 (2018) ===
The Real Housewives of Dallas season 3 episodes
No. overall	No. in season	Title	Original release date	U.S. viewers (millions)
26	1	"Your Amygdala Is Showing"	August 15, 2018	0.76
27	2	"Bubbles and Brooding"	August 22, 2018	0.75
28	3	"The Badger of Beaver Creek"	August 29, 2018	0.75
29	4	"God Save the Queen, B..."	September 5, 2018	0.74
30	5	"Rodeo Barbie"	September 12, 2018	0.72
31	6	"Smashing Friendships"	September 19, 2018	0.68
32	7	"Babes in Brandiland"	September 26, 2018	0.61
33	8	"Off the Leash"	October 3, 2018	0.65
34	9	"80's Ladies"	October 10, 2018	0.68
35	10	"Are You Saying I'm an Alcoholic?"	October 17, 2018	0.61
36	11	"A Recipe for Disaster"	October 24, 2018	0.67
37	12	"Where's Copenhagen?"	October 31, 2018	0.56
38	13	"Something is Rotten in Denmark"	November 7, 2018	0.65
39	14	"Growers and Show-ers"	November 14, 2018	0.60
40	15	"Game of Phones"	November 21, 2018	0.63
41	16	"Party Fouls"	November 28, 2018	0.67
42	17	"Reunion Part 1"	December 5, 2018	0.81
43	18	"Reunion Part 2"	December 12, 2018	0.66

=== Season 4 (2019–2020) ===
Cary Deuber departed as a series regular; she continued to appear in a recurring capacity. Kary Brittingham joined the cast.

The Real Housewives of Dallas season 4 episodes
No. overall	No. in season	Title	Original release date	U.S. viewers (millions)
44	1	"Of Friends and Frenemies"	September 4, 2019	0.68
45	2	"Roasted and Toasted"	September 11, 2019	0.63
46	3	"Donde Esta Margarita"	September 18, 2019	0.62
47	4	"Trash Talk"	September 25, 2019	0.56
48	5	"Worst Vacation Ever"	October 2, 2019	0.65
49	6	"Cirque d'Lingerie"	October 9, 2019	0.66
50	7	"Ghost Busted"	October 16, 2019	0.60
51	8	"Guess Who's Coming to Happy Hour?"	October 23, 2019	0.77
52	9	"A Mother of a Day"	October 30, 2019	0.68
53	10	"My Big Fat Dallas Wedding"	November 6, 2019	0.78
54	11	"My Life on the Dee List"	November 13, 2019	0.61
55	12	"Babes in Thailand"	November 20, 2019	0.66
56	13	"One Fight in Bangkok"	December 4, 2019	0.67
57	14	"Triggered in Thailand"	December 11, 2019	0.61
58	15	"Remember the Alamo"	December 18, 2019	0.60
59	16	"Reunion Part 1"	January 1, 2020	0.75
60	17	"Reunion Part 2"	January 8, 2020	0.77

=== Season 5 (2021) ===
Final Season. LeeAnne Locken departed as a series regular. Tiffany Moon joined the cast. Jen Davis Long served in a recurring capacity.

The Real Housewives of Dallas season 5 episodes
No. overall	No. in season	Title	Original release date	U.S. viewers (millions)
61	1	"Bursting the Quarantine Bubble"	January 5, 2021	0.34
62	2	"You Dim Sum, You Lose Some"	January 12, 2021	0.54
63	3	"Kary'd Away"	January 19, 2021	0.55
64	4	"Whine Connoisseurs"	January 26, 2021	0.62
65	5	"Sour Grapes"	February 2, 2021	0.62
66	6	"Another One Bites the Crust"	February 9, 2021	0.54
67	7	"Getting Weird in Austin"	February 16, 2021	0.53
68	8	"Austin, We Have a Problem"	March 2, 2021	0.60
69	9	"The Doctor Is Out"	March 9, 2021	0.50
70	10	"A Simmons by Any Other Name"	March 16, 2021	0.61
71	11	"Mommy Dearests"	March 23, 2021	0.49
72	12	"RV Having Fun Yet?"	March 30, 2021	0.46
73	13	"Bigfoot, Bigger Drama"	April 6, 2021	0.49
74	14	"A Doggone Mess"	April 13, 2021	0.50
75	15	"Straight Outta the '80s"	April 20, 2021	0.55
76	16	"Southfork Goes South"	April 27, 2021	0.58
77	17	"Reunion Part 1"	May 4, 2021	0.37
78	18	"Reunion Part 2"	May 11, 2021	0.52
