= I Believe, Help My Unbelief =

Studio album by Rival Choir
- Released: February 5, 2016
- Genre: Christian hardcore, Christian metal, Christian rock, post-hardcore, metalcore
- Length: 41:54
- Label: Facedown

Rival Choir chronology
Struggle Well (2014)	I Believe, Help My Unbelief (2016)

I Believe, Help My Unbelief is the first studio album by Rival Choir, released on February 5, 2016 on Facedown Records. It was the band's second release with the label, with their first being Struggle Well, released in 2014 when they were still known as Mouth of the South. This is the band's third album, their first being Transparency, an independent release.

== Critical reception ==
Professional ratings
Review scores
Source	Rating
Cross Rhythms	9/10 squares
HM Magazine	4/5 stars
Jesus Freak Hideout	4/5 stars
Mind Equals Blown	7.5/10 stars

David Stagg, allotting the album a four star review by HM Magazine, responds, "In leaving behind the singularity of one mouth, the band has learned they’re going to gain the ultimate prize: a choir of voices, a dedicated group of fans that listened to them." Indicating in a nine out of ten review from Cross Rhythms, Ian Webber states, "In Rival Choir, Facedown Records have a band that are delivering a fresh take on metalcore that will not be to everyone's taste with its lack of traditional elements, but one that provides much to chew over for those looking for loud music with a lyrically mature edge."

Awarding the album four stars at Jesus Freak Hideout, Timothy Estabrooks writes, "I Believe, Help My Unbelief is a truly passionate album." Scott Fryberger, giving the album four stars from Jesus Freak Hideout, states, "it sets the bar rather high; not just for other bands, but for themselves as well." Rating the album four stars for Jesus Freak Hideout, Jeremy Barnes says, "On the whole, with continued development and maintained creative energy, Rival Choir may soon become a flagship in a revitalized genre." Reviewing the album for Anchor Music News, Rob Clark describes, "This is an album that will have you hooked from the first verse to last." Tim Dodderidge, putting a seven and a half star rating upon the album at Mind Equals Blown, says, "The music itself isn't exactly anything new for the genres of metalcore and melodic hardcore, but I Believe, Help My Unbelief, is a definite step-up from the outfit's previous effort under a different name."

== Track listing ==
No.	Title	Length
1.	"Poured Out"	3:00
2.	"Beggar"	3:07
3.	"Empty Words"	3:09
4.	"Mislead"	3:31
5.	"Quiet Life"	5:10
6.	"Aftermath"	2:50
7.	"Remission"	3:34
8.	"House Fire"	4:10
9.	"Sojourn"	3:40
10.	"Convalesce"	3:29
11.	"I Believe,"	3:15
12.	"Help My Unbelief"	2:59
Total length:		41:54

== Charts ==
Chart (2016)	Peak position
US Christian Albums (Billboard)	29
US Top Hard Rock Albums (Billboard)	16
US Heatseekers Albums (Billboard)	14
US Independent Albums (Billboard)	48
