= Gretchen Polhemus =

American beauty pageant titleholder

- Born: Gretchen Lynn Polhemus; May 12, 1965 (age 61); Fort Worth, Texas, U.S.
- Height: 5 ft 11 in (1.80 m)
- Spouse: Kirk Jensen
- Children: 5
- Beauty pageant titleholder
- Title: Miss Texas USA 1989; Miss USA 1989
- Hair color: Brown
- Eye color: Green
- Major competitions: Miss Texas USA 1989; (Winner); Miss USA 1989; (Winner); Miss Universe 1989; (2nd Runner-Up)

Gretchen Lynn Polhemus-Jensen (born May 12, 1965) is an American actress, journalist, tv host and beauty pageant titleholder who won Miss USA 1989 and second runner-up to Miss Universe 1989.

== Early life ==
Prior to competing in Miss Texas USA, Jensen was working as a cattle broker and realtor in her home state.

== Miss Texas USA ==
Jensen competed as Miss Bedford USA in the 14th edition of the Miss Texas USA pageant in 1987 and received the Photogenic award, ultimately placing second runner-up to eventual winner, Courtney Gibbs.

The following year, she competed again as Miss Fort Worth USA and won the title, earning the right to represent Texas in Miss USA 1989.

== Miss USA 1989 ==
As the official representative of her state to the 1989 Miss USA pageant, held in Mobile, Alabama, Jensen captured the crown of Miss USA, becoming its 38th titleholder, and the last of five consecutive winners from Texas during the 1980s. Her national costume was a cowgirl.

At the 1989 Miss Universe pageant, she placed fifth in semifinal interview, fourth in swimsuit and eighth in evening gown, advancing to the competition's Top 5 finalists, and ultimately finishing second runner-up to eventual winner, Angela Visser of the Netherlands.

== Life after Miss USA ==
In 1993, Jensen appeared in the made-for-TV-movie Bonanza: The Return with Ben Johnson and Michael Landon Jr.; she has also worked as a sports correspondent for ESPN and for a CBS affiliate as a news correspondent. She was also a judge at the 2003 Miss USA pageant, resides in Salt Lake City's metropolitan area and is now a divorced mother of five. Her daughter, Baylee is Miss Utah USA 2017. She was formerly a co-host of KTVX-TV's "Good Things Utah".

Awards and achievements
Preceded by Amanda Olivares	Miss Universe 2nd Runner-Up; 1989	Succeeded by Lizeth Mahecha
