= Big Rich Atlanta =

- Genre: Reality
- Country of origin: United States
- No. of seasons: 1
- No. of episodes: 13

Production
- Executive producers: Allison Grodner; Merah Chung; Rich Meehan; Sarah Weidman
- Running time: 40–43 minutes
- Production company: Fly on the Wall Entertainment

Original release
- Network: Style Network
- Release: January 23 – April 21, 2013

Related
- Big Rich Texas

Big Rich Atlanta is an American reality television series on the Style Network. The series premiered on January 23, 2013. Big Rich Atlanta follows a group of wealthy Georgia women and their daughters who do whatever it takes to be at the top of the local social scene and in control of the action.

== Cast ==
- Virginia: Meyer and Harvin's mother, Virginia, moved in with them after her divorced was finalized. Virginia manages her daughters' business.
- Harvin: Harvin is Virginia's eldest daughter and is 30 years old. She owns a clothing and jewelry line named She Blames Me.
- Meyer: Meyer is 28 years old. She is part owner of her joint business She Blames Me.
- Sabrina: Sabrina is a newly single pastor. She had a successful dancing career but turned it into a career in international dance ministry.
- Anandi: Anandi is a 19‑year‑old sophomore in college. She admits that she's a nerd but she also has an interest in beauty and fashion which has led to her partaking in beauty pageants.
- Marcia: Marcia is Meagan's mother and is an interior designer. She's working with her daughter to launch a mobile fashion truck business.
- Meagan: Meagan is a licensed real estate agent. She and her mother are currently working on opening Atlanta's first mobile boutique.
- Ashlee: Ashlee is a former Miss Georgia Teen. She was married at a young age but is now divorced. Ashlee lives in a penthouse apartment that was inherited from her grandfather.
- Katie: Katie is a fourth generation Atlantan. She is a mother of two and is married.
- Diana: Diana is one of Katie's children, and is 17 years old. She's involved in the world of competitive cheerleading.
- Sharlinda: Sharlinda is co-owner of Tu La 2 Nail salon, which she runs with her twin sister, Brie. She is married to Q. Parker of the R&B group 112.
- Kahdijiha: Kahdijiha is 26 years old and the daughter of Sharlinda.
- Brié: Brié is Sharlinda's twin sister and serves as a second mom to Kahdijiha.

== Episodes ==
| No. | Title | Original release date |
|---|---|---|
| Special | "Meet the Mothers and Daughters of Big Rich Atlanta" | January 16, 2013 |
| 1 | "Bigger, Richer, Peachier" | January 23, 2013 |
Ashley is unprepared when she is confronted at her divorce party. Virginia is unsure of investing into her daughters business. Ashley and Megan have a verbal altercation over a mutual friend.
| 2 | "Boss Bitch Boot Camp" | January 30, 2013 |
Anandi and Diana choose Ashlee to be their pageant coach. Kahdijiha goes house hunting but becomes irritated when her mother constantly adds her opinion. Ashlee and Harvin's friendship annoys Meyer.
| 3 | "Let Them Throw Cake" | February 6, 2013 |
Kahdijiha starts to feel that Ashlee is turning some of the girls against her. Megan wants to start a mobile fashion shop. Harvin and Meyer think their mother is telling too much personal information.
| 4 | "When Cougars Attack" | February 13, 2013 |
Sabrina hosts a financial seminar. Virginia and Marcia invite Katie to go out for drinks. Ashlee isolates herself from the group after the cupcake incident.
| 5 | "Shut the Truck Up!" | February 20, 2013 |
Sharlinda hosts an art gallery viewing, where Harvin showcases her work. Meagan's newest business venture takes a turn for the worse.
| 6 | "Lake House of Horrors" | March 3, 2013 |
Megan invites all the girls for a getaway. Sharlinda causes Meyer and Harvin's business deal to have problems. Katie is surprised when Marcia offers to design a room for her. Note: This is the first episode to air at the series' new time slot on Sunday at 9PM ET/PT.
| 7 | "She's Baaaack" | March 10, 2013 |
Ashlee returns to socialize with the ladies after her leave of absence due to the incident at her birthday party. Virginia attempts to reconnect Meyer with a previous love interest. Marcia hosts a Halloween party, where Sharlinda attends for the sole purpose of receiving an apology.
| 8 | "Preacher's Daughter Bares All" | March 17, 2013 |
Katie takes a turn to host a Harvest party, where drama seems to engulf. Meanwhile, Ashlee is devising an evil plan for revenge on the girls. Anadi bares it all for Harvin and Meyer's risque photo shoot.
| 9 | "Ashlee's Revenge" | March 24, 2013 |
Ashlee continues with her malicious ways and tries to make Meyer her ally while she works to have Kahdijiha arrested. Kahdijiha uses the money her father gives her to treat her mother to a day at the spa. Sabrina donates her time to volunteer at a gym for inner-city children.
| 10 | "Post Arrest Distress" | March 31, 2013 |
Khadijiha comes face-to-face with every one at the country club after her arrest. Meyer attends various consultations with plastic surgeons for a breast augmentation. Virginia surprises everyone by unveiling her lineage at a heritage dinner.
| 11 | "Wrath of the Preacher" | April 7, 2013 |
Marcia takes part in the Designers' Show House, and Meagan volunteers to help. Neither of them are thrilled once they receive news that Katie's good friend, Donald, is partaking in the event. Ashlee launches an anti-bullying charity. Virginia tries to teach Harvin and Meyer how to be financially responsible.
| 12 | "Toying With Mama's Boy Toy" | April 14, 2013 |
Virginia thinks about moving into her own place. Harvin and Meyer present their jewelry line to designer Ashley Paige. Sabrina ponders leaving her ministry after her incident with Katie, and Anandi's recent topless photo shoot. Virginia thinks about purchasing her own home, despite her daughters thinking otherwise.
| 13 | "Belles of the Brawl" | April 21, 2013 |
Meyer and Harvin work to the last minute in order to make sure their jewelry is manufactured on time for the Ashley Paige runway show. Harvin feels that Meyer isn't putting her all into the business. Virginia informs everyone about her future in Atlanta. Anandi chooses to pursue modeling instead of the pageant life. Kahdijiha and Ashlee face each other at the fashion show.
