= Leila Sbitani =

American host and actress

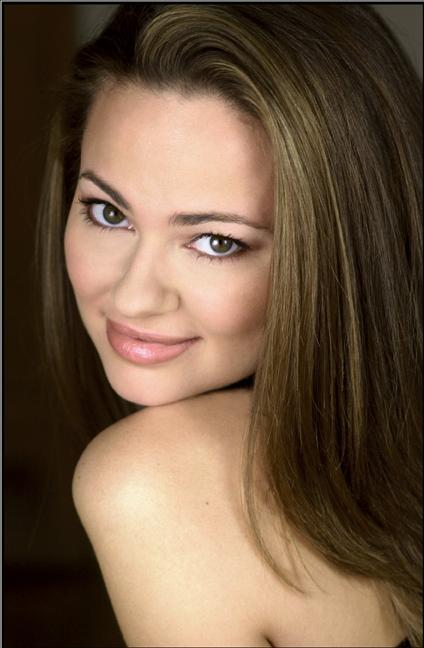
- Website: leilasbitani.com

Leila Sbitani is an American host and actress. Her career has included hosting stints on Entertainment Tonight, E!, Style, WE, ION Television, Metro TV, Oxygen, and TV Land. Her film credits include The Reunion, which was a winner at the New York International Independent Film and Video Festival, and Fractured. Her favorite regional theatre roles are Kathleen in Terra Nova and Maggie in Lend Me a Tenor.

== Filmography ==
=== TV Series-Non-Guest Star ===
- Studio Y (1999) as Host
- 48 Hour Wedding (2002) as Host
- Nice Package (2004) as Host
- Hi-Jinks as Host
- TV Land Awards-All Access (2011) as Host
- Best Night In on TV Land as Host (2011–present)

=== Guest Star ===
- Guiding Light as Kitty
- All My Children as Iris
- Apartment 2F as Stacey

=== Movies ===
- Fractured (1996) as Jessie
- The Reunion (1998) as Ashley
- The Senator's Daughter (Web Series) (2011) as Nancy
- Dead Man's Trigger (Web Series) (2012) as Agent Thomas

=== Commercials ===
Sbitani appeared in a series of more than 80 commercials for Belle Tire in Michigan from 1997 to 2001. Eleven years later, in the fall of 2012, she was brought back to do an additional series of Belle Tire commercials which ran throughout 2013.
