= Brandi Redmond =

American television personality and dancer

- Born: Brandi Nace; July 10, 1978 (age 48); Memphis, Tennessee, U.S.
- Occupations: Television personality and dancer
- Years active: 2000–present
- Spouse: Bryan Redmond (m. 2003)
- Children: 4

Brandi Redmond (née Nace; born July 10, 1978) is an American television personality and former professional cheerleader. From 2000 to 2005, Redmond was a member on the Dallas Cowboys Cheerleaders. From 2016 to 2021, Redmond starred on the Bravo reality series The Real Housewives of Dallas.

== Early life and education ==
Brandi Nace was born on July 10, 1978, and raised in Memphis, Tennessee.

Upon moving to Texas in her youth, she attended Blinn College before transferring to Texas Woman's University.

== Career ==
Redmond began cheering with the Dallas Cowboys Cheerleaders in 2000, where she traveled internationally to Afghanistan, Iraq, Kuwait, Japan, and Europe. She took the 2003 season off to graduate and get married and returned in 2004. She appeared in the pilot for CMT's Dallas Cowboys Cheerleaders: Making the Team in 2005 as a returning veteran. She resigned from the team in 2006.

In February 2016, Bravo announced Redmond would be a main cast member on their reality series, The Real Housewives of Dallas. Redmond remained a cast member for the entirety of the show's course until its cancellation in 2021. In February 2017, Redmond launched her clothing and accessories line, Brandi Land, with her sister-in-law, Megan. In late 2018, Redmond began co-hosting the Weekly Dose of BS podcast with fellow housewife cast member Stephanie Hollman.

== Personal life ==
Brandi began dating Bryan Redmond in high school and they married in 2003. Together they have three biological children and an adopted son.

== Filmography ==
Year	Title	Role	Notes
2016–2021	The Real Housewives of Dallas	Herself	Main Cast (Seasons 1–5)
2016–2019	Watch What Happens Live with Andy Cohen	Herself	7 episodes
