= Lou Beatty Jr. =

American male and television actor

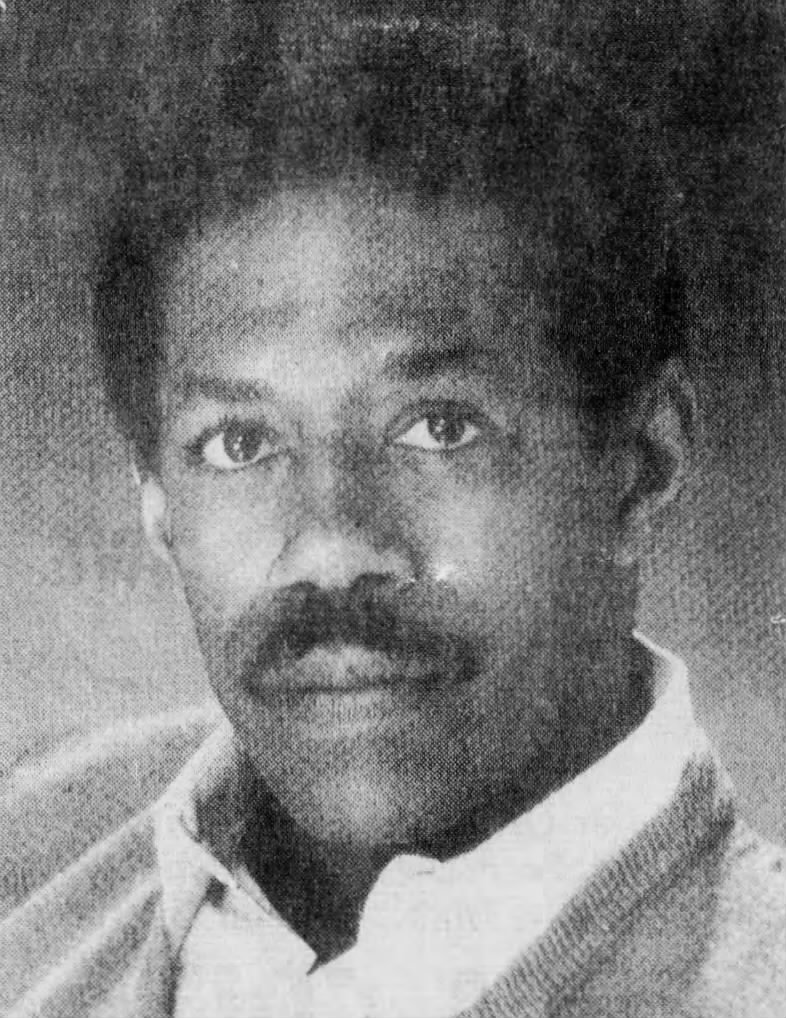
- Beatty in 1989
- Born: Lou Roy Beatty Jr. Detroit, Michigan, U.S.
- Occupations: Film and television actor
- Children: 2

Lou Roy Beatty Jr. is an American film and television actor. He is best known for playing the recurring role of Rudy Richards, a police detective in the final season of the American soap opera television series Dynasty.

== Life and career ==
Beatty was born in Detroit, Michigan. In the late 1980s, he moved to California. He began his screen career in 1988, appearing in the NBC sitcom television series 227. In the same year, he played the recurring role of Dixon in the ABC medical drama television series HeartBeat, and the recurring role of Rudy Richards, a police detective in the final season of the ABC soap opera television series Dynasty until 1989.

Later in his career, Beatty guest-starred in numerous television programs JAG, Jake and the Fatman, The West Wing, Hunter, Grey's Anatomy, 9-1-1, The X-Files, Matlock, Betty White's Off Their Rockers, Las Vegas, Station 19 and Without a Trace. He played the recurring roles of Judge Gordon Kolodny in the ABC legal drama television series Boston Legal, and the recurring role of Rome's father Walter Howard in the ABC family drama television series A Million Little Things. He also appeared in films such as Fight Club, Disney's The Kid, Ford v Ferrari, Beyond the Farthest Star, The Terror Within II, Hard to Kill, K-11 and Comet.

Beatty most recent role was in the 2025 film Novocaine.

== Personal life ==
According to The Tribune, Beatty is divorced, and has two children.
