= The Real Housewives of Dallas =

American reality television series

- Genre: Reality television
- Starring: Stephanie Hollman; Brandi Redmond; LeeAnne Locken; Cary Deuber; Tiffany Hendra; D'Andra Simmons; Kameron Westcott; Kary Brittingham; Tiffany Moon
- Country of origin: United States
- Original language: English
- No. of seasons: 5
- No. of episodes: 78 (list of episodes)

Production
- Executive producers: Rich Bye; Andrew Hoegl; Andy Cohen
- Producers: Samantha Billett; John Paparazzo; Adam Karpel
- Camera setup: Multiple
- Running time: 42 minutes
- Production company: Goodbye Pictures

Original release
- Network: Bravo
- Release: April 11, 2016 – May 11, 2021

The Real Housewives of Dallas, abbreviated RHOD, is an American reality television series that premiered on Bravo on April 11, 2016. Developed as the ninth installment of The Real Housewives franchise, it aired for five seasons and focused on the personal and professional lives of several women living in Dallas, Texas.

The season five cast consisted of Kameron Westcott, Kary Brittingham, Stephanie Hollman, Tiffany Moon, Brandi Redmond and D’Andra Simmons, with Jennifer Davis Long debuting as a friend of the housewives. Previously-featured cast members included original housewives Tiffany Hendra, LeeAnne Locken and Cary Deuber.

== Overview ==
=== Seasons 1–3 ===
The Real Housewives of Dallas was announced in November 15, 2015, as the ninth installment of The Real Housewives franchise. The first season premiered on April 11, 2016, and starred Cary Deuber, Tiffany Hendra, Stephanie Hollman, LeeAnne Locken and Brandi Redmond, while Marie Reyes appeared in a recurring capacity. After the first season, Hendra left the show. The second season premiered on August 14, 2017, with D'Andra Simmons and Kameron Westcott joining the cast, and Hendra appearing in a guest capacity.

The third season premiered on August 15, 2018, which featured the cast from the previous season with occasional guest appearances from Joyce Morrison.

=== Seasons 4–5 ===
The fourth season premiered on September 4, 2019. Deuber was demoted in a "friend of" capacity. Kary Brittingham joined as a main cast member, and Hendra appeared as a guest. Locken departed the series after the fourth season. The fifth season, which premiered on January 5, 2021, featured new cast member Tiffany Moon, with Jennifer Davis Long appearing as a friend of the housewives.

=== Scrapped sixth season ===
Redmond announced her departure shortly after the Season 5 reunion aired. Production began on Season 6 shortly thereafter, with test filming taking place with new women, in addition to Moon, Westcott, and Simmons. Shortly thereafter, the series was put on a hiatus and Season 6 was scrapped. In 2021, a Bravo official revealed there were no plans to bring it back for another season yet.

== Cast ==
The Real Housewives of Dallas cast members
Cast member	Seasons				
Cast member	1	2	3	4	5
Cary Deuber	Main	Main	Main	Friend	
Tiffany Hendra	Main	Guest		Guest	
Stephanie Hollman	Main	Main	Main	Main	Main
LeeAnne Locken	Main	Main	Main	Main	
Brandi Redmond	Main	Main	Main	Main	Main
D'Andra Simmons		Main	Main	Main	Main
Kameron Westcott		Main	Main	Main	Main
Kary Brittingham				Main	Main
Tiffany Moon				Guest	Main
Friends of the housewives
Marie Reyes	Friend				
Jennifer Davis-Long					Friend

== Episodes ==
The Real Housewives of Dallas episodes
Season	Episodes	Originally released		Average Viewers
Season	Episodes	First released	Last released	Average Viewers
1	11	April 11, 2016	June 19, 2016	0.89
2	14	August 14, 2017	November 13, 2017	0.81
3	18	August 15, 2018	December 12, 2018	0.68
4	17	September 4, 2019	January 8, 2020	0.67
5	18	January 5, 2021	May 11, 2021	0.52

== Reception ==
=== Ratings ===
The Real Housewives of Dallas : U.S. viewers per episode (thousands)

Season	Episode number																		Average
Season	1	2	3	4	5	6	7	8	9	10	11	12	13	14	15	16	17	18	Average
1	1070	920	820	830	780	880	850	890	940	950	840	–							888
2	840	690	800	850	730	850	830	800	810	800	860	800	830	890	–				813
3	760	750	750	740	720	680	610	650	680	610	670	560	650	600	630	670	810	660	678
4	680	630	620	560	650	660	600	770	680	780	610	660	670	610	600	750	770	–	665
5	340	540	550	620	620	540	530	600	500	610	490	460	490	500	550	580	370	520	523

Audience measurement performed by Nielsen Media Research

== Broadcast history ==
The Real Housewives of Dallas aired regularly on Bravo in the United States; most episodes were approximately forty-two minutes in length, and are broadcast in high definition. The series alternated airing between Monday, Tuesday, Wednesday and Thursday evenings and shifted between the 9:00, and 10:00 PM timeslots.
