= News 12+ =

- Country: United States
- Broadcast area: The Bronx; Brooklyn; Connecticut; Hudson Valley; Long Island; New Jersey; Westchester County
- Headquarters: Woodbury, New York

Programming
- Language: English
- Picture format: NTSC; HDTV 1080i

Ownership
- Owner: Optimum News (Optimum Communications)

History
- Launched: August 5, 1998; 28 years ago
- Closed: December 27, 2026; 50 days' time
- Former names: MSG Metro Traffic & Weather (1998–2005); News 12 Traffic & Weather (2005-2019)

Links
- Website: www.news12.com

News 12+ (formerly News 12 Traffic & Weather) is an American cable news television channel owned by the Optimum Communications News subsidiary of Optimum Communications. The channel provides 24-hour live reports on traffic conditions and weather forecasts for the New York City metropolitan area, updated every five minutes. The channel is headquartered in Woodbury, New York.

It is an affiliate of the News 12 Networks slate of regional cable news channels in the New York City area (each of which focus on areas outside of Manhattan and Queens, including the easternmost boroughs). News 12+ is carried on channel 61 on Optimum Communications systems in the region, and is also available on Verizon Fios and Comcast Xfinity in portions of the Hudson Valley region of upstate New York.

== Background ==
The channel traces back to News 12 Weather. In the early 1990s it would air in the mornings on most Cablevision systems in place of Bravo and E! when they shared a channel on Cablevision in the Long Island area. When Optimum TV launched in 1996, it got a full-time location in those areas.

On August 5, 1998, the service was launched as MSG Metro Traffic & Weather as part of the MSG Metro Channels slate (and as of 2022, it is the only channel that was a part of the original MSG Metro Channels slate that survives in operation); its format was also revised to include regular updates on traffic conditions in the New York metropolitan area. As a result, it became the first strictly local traffic and weather channel in the Tri-State area; although it faced competition for weather coverage via local broadcast stations and The Weather Channel, the traffic component was the feature that made the channel unique.

On October 5, 2005, the channel was rebranded News 12 Traffic & Weather. The channel launched high definition simulcast services of its five regional feeds in November 2012. In December 2013, News 12 Networks announced it would lay off eight of the channel's ten meteorologists and News 12 Traffic & Weather before a massive staff lay-off. The channel formerly had a full-time staff of 40 reporters and 10 meteorologists and 30 of its 40 traffic reporters; it also announced that the channels would broadcast in a semi-automated manner, with live reports only throughout the morning drive, unless significant traffic or severe weather conditions warrant extended coverage.

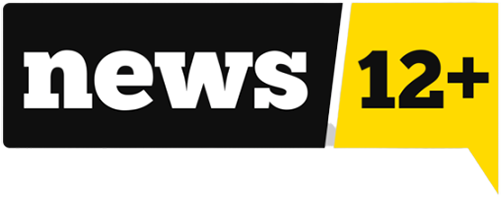
Original News 12+ logo. Used until early 2020.

In August 2019, Altice USA (now Optimum Communications) rebranded the network as News 12+ and expanded the programming to include short headline news stories, in addition to traffic and weather reports.

In October 2026, Optimum announced that it would shut down operations of News 12+ on December 27 due to the company experiencing financial difficulties.

== Programming ==
As with the rolling news-formatted channels under the News 12 umbrella, News 12+ is divided into five channel feeds available in different regions of the New York metropolitan area (New York City, New Jersey, Long Island, the Hudson Valley and Connecticut), which are centralcasted from News 12's headquarters in Woodbury, New York. The channel maintains a staff of five part-time and several freelance traffic reporters, and two on-camera meteorologists. News 12+ airs mainly traffic and weather reports, and also airs short headline news at some times.
