= Hi-Jinks =

- Presented by: Leila Sbitani
- Theme music composer: Dave Baron
- Country of origin: United States
- Original language: English
- No. of seasons: 2
- No. of episodes: 18

Production
- Executive producers: Brad Kuhlman; Joe Boyd; Susan Cohen-Dickler; Jan Dickler; Ray Murray; Bethany McMahon; Kim Rosenblum; Karen Stein Solomon
- Running time: 19–21 minutes
- Production companies: Banyan Productions (season 1); Stone and Company Entertainment (season 2)

Original release
- Network: Nick at Nite
- Release: August 2, 2005 – October 31, 2006

Hi-Jinks is a hidden camera show that aired on Nick at Nite from August 2, 2005, to October 31, 2006. In the show, hosted by Leila Sbitani, parents are given a chance to play practical jokes on their children, in a similar fashion to Candid Camera. Taking a cue from Punk'd, each episode features a prank that is conducted with the assistance of a known celebrity.

== Episodes ==
=== Series overview ===
Season	Episodes	Originally released	
Season	Episodes	First released	Last released
1	6	August 2, 2005	September 6, 2005
2	12	February 28, 2006	August 15, 2006
Special		October 31, 2006	

=== Season 1 (2005) ===
No. overall	No. in season	Title	Original release date	Prod. code
1	1	"Episode 101"	August 2, 2005	101
Guest star: Vivica Fox
2	2	"Episode 102"	August 9, 2005	102
Guest star: Chris Webber
3	3	"Episode 103"	August 16, 2005	103
Guest star: Susan Sarandon
4	4	"Episode 104"	August 23, 2005	104
Guest star: Richard Kind
5	5	"Episode 105"	August 30, 2005	105
Guest star: Meredith Vieira
6	6	"Episode 106"	September 6, 2005	106
Guest star: Gilbert Gottfried

=== Season 2 (2006) ===
No. overall	No. in season	Title	Original release date	Prod. code
7	1	"Alan Thicke"	February 28, 2006	201
Guest star: Alan Thicke
8	2	"Jane Seymour"	March 7, 2006	202
Guest star: Jane Seymour
9	3	"Tichina Arnold"	March 14, 2006	203
Guest star: Tichina Arnold
10	4	"Patti LaBelle"	March 21, 2006	204
Guest star: Patti LaBelle
11	5	"Evander Holyfield"	March 28, 2006	205
Guest star: Evander Holyfield
12	6	"Tony Hawk; Darlene Westgor"	April 4, 2006	206
Guest stars: Tony Hawk, Darlene Westgor
13	7	"John Schneider"	July 11, 2006	207
Guest star: John Schneider
14	8	"Ted McGinley"	July 18, 2006	208
Guest star: Ted McGinley
15	9	"Holly Robinson Peete; Sonic Burger"	July 25, 2006	210
Guest star: Holly Robinson Peete
16	10	"Alfonso Ribeiro"	August 1, 2006	209
Guest star: Alfonso Ribeiro
17	11	"Corbin Bernsen"	August 8, 2006	211
Guest star: Corbin Bernsen
18	12	"Bo Bice; Dave Coulier"	August 15, 2006	212
Guest stars: Bo Bice, Dave Coulier

== Special (2006) ==
Title	Original release date
"Halloween Special"	October 31, 2006
