= Roshumba Williams =

American model

- Born: August 1, 1968 (age 58); Chicago, Illinois, U.S.
- Occupations: Model, actress
- Spouse: Gary Dourdan (m. 1992; div. 1994)
- Modeling information
- Height: 5 ft 11 in (1.80 m)
- Hair color: Black
- Eye color: Dark brown
- Agency: Wilhelmina Models

Roshumba Williams (born August 1, 1968) is an American supermodel who first became known for her appearance in the Sports Illustrated Swimsuit Edition in the early 1990s. She also works as an actress and reality TV show judge. As a teenager in 1987, she was discovered in Paris by fashion designer Yves Saint Laurent and quickly became a regular fixture on international runways.

== Career ==
Born, in Chicago, Illinois, Roshumba appeared in such feature films as Woody Allen's Celebrity, Robert Altman's Prêt-à-Porter and the comedy Hair Show. In 1999, Williams published her first book, The Complete Idiot's Guide to Being a Model, a title in the widely read series by Penguin Publishing USA, The Complete Idiot's Guide to.... She also authored the second edition of The Complete Idiot's Guide to Being a Model in 2007. In 2002, she was hired by Entertainment Tonight as a substitute anchor for Mary Hart after a successful season on the red carpet as a correspondent. She conducted several celebrity interviews. From 2004 Roshumba began hosting lifestyle and make-over shows, including Beautiful Homes, Amazing Homes and Fabulous Bathrooms for HGTV; Fox's make-over show Live Like a Star; WE's Swimsuit Secrets Revealed; and Travel Channel's Beach Week. In 2008 she served as a correspondent for Mercedes-Benz Fashion Week. She is a judge on the Oxygen Network's bi-weekly hair-styling competition reality series Tease, which has been airing since 2007. In 2010, Roshumba became a judge and mentor on the reality television competition series She's Got the Look, in which women compete to become the next great supermodel 35 years or older.

== Personal life ==
Roshumba married actor Gary Dourdan in 1992; the couple divorced in 1994.
