= Miss USA 1989 =

38th Miss USA pageant

- Date: February 28, 1989
- Presenters: Dick Clark; Angie Dickinson; Laura Harring
- Entertainment: Tommy Tune
- Venue: Mobile Civic Center Theatre, Mobile, Alabama
- Broadcaster: CBS, WKRG
- Entrants: 51
- Placements: 10
- Winner: Gretchen Polhemus; Texas
- Congeniality: Kimberly Nicewonder (Virginia)
- Best State Costume: Kelly Holub (Illinois)
- Photogenic: Elizabeth Primm (Louisiana)

Miss USA 1989 was the 38th Miss USA pageant, televised live from the Mobile Civic Center Theatre in Mobile, Alabama on February 28, 1989. At the conclusion of the final competition, Gretchen Polhemus of Texas was crowned by outgoing titleholder Courtney Gibbs. She was the fifth consecutive Miss Texas USA to win the pageant.

This was the first Miss USA pageant hosted by Dick Clark (The Miss Universe Pageant was hosted by John Forsythe that year), with color commentary by Angie Dickinson. This pageant was held in Alabama for the first and so far only time.

== Results ==
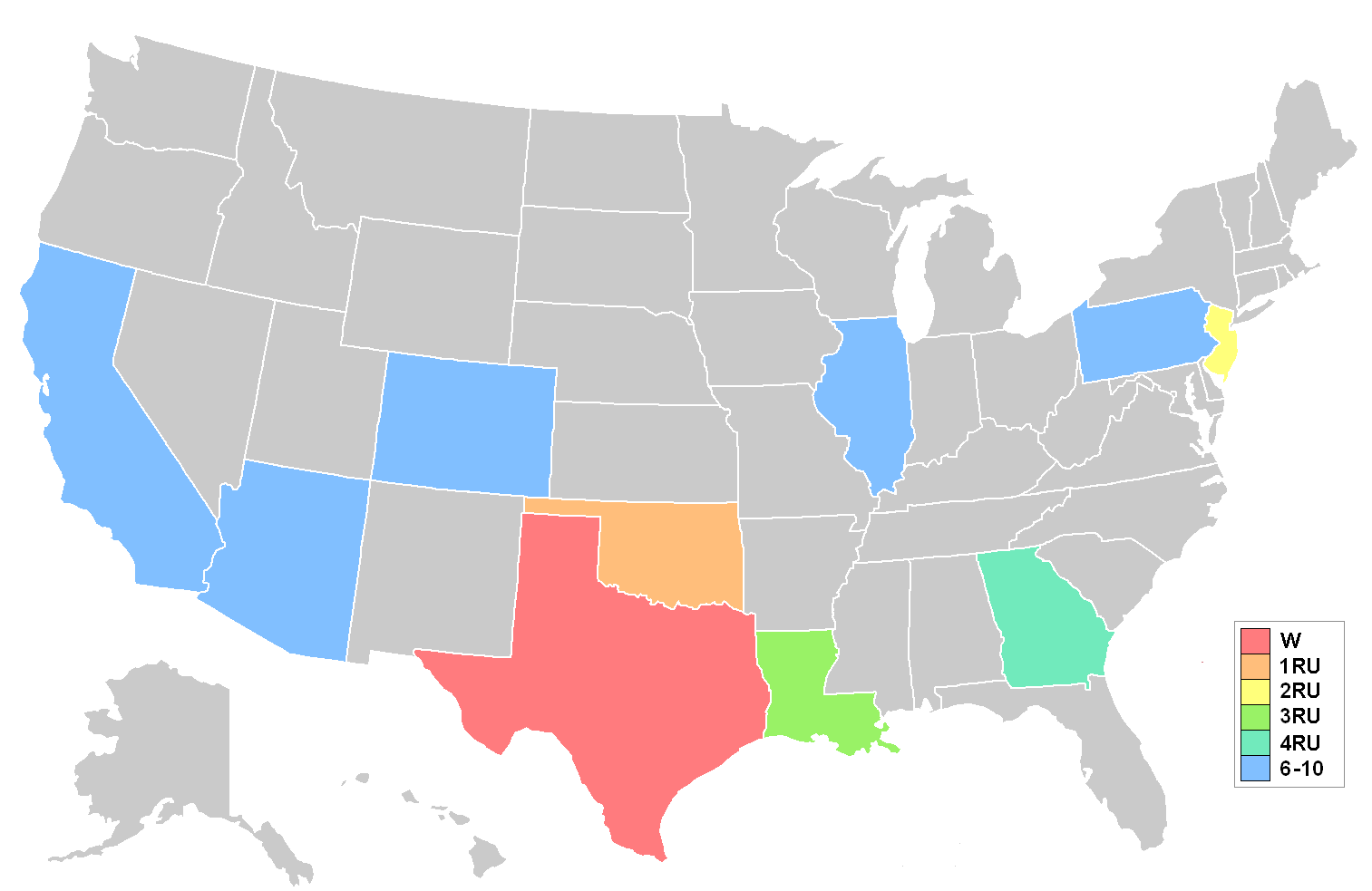
Map showing placements by state

=== Placements ===
Final results	Contestant
Miss USA 1989	Texas – Gretchen Polhemus
1st Runner-Up	Oklahoma – Jill Scheffert
2nd Runner-Up	New Jersey – Debra Lee Husti
3rd Runner-Up	Louisiana – Elizabeth Primm
4th Runner-Up	(Georgia (U.S. state)) Georgia – Michelle Nemeth
Top 10	California – Christina Faust; Colorado – Debbie James; Pennsylvania – Denise Epps; Arizona – LeeAnne Locken; Illinois – Kelly Holub

=== Special awards ===
Award	Contestant
Miss Congeniality	Virginia – Kimberly Nicewonder
Miss Photogenic	Louisiana – Elizabeth Primm
Best State Costume	Illinois – Kelly Holub

=== Final competition ===
State	Preliminary Average	Interview	Swimsuit	Evening Gown	Semifinal Average
Texas	9.084 (1)	9.425 (1)	9.535 (1)	9.601 (1)	9.520 (1)
Oklahoma	8.662 (3)	8.880 (2)	8.762 (5)	9.214 (2)	8.952 (2)
New Jersey	8.510 (7)	8.626 (5)	8.712 (6)	9.165 (3)	8.834 (3)
(Georgia (U.S. state)) Georgia	8.407 (9)	8.821 (3)	8.473 (7)	9.032 (4)	8.775 (4)
Louisiana	8.829 (2)	8.600 (6)	8.820 (4)	8.710 (7)	8.710 (5)
California	8.659 (4)	8.313 (8)	8.977 (2)	8.774 (6)	8.688 (6)
Colorado	8.388 (10)	8.638 (4)	8.432 (9)	8.786 (5)	8.618 (7)
Pennsylvania	8.580 (5)	8.534 (7)	8.467 (8)	8.613 (10)	8.538 (8)
Arizona	8.529 (6)	7.792 (10)	8.833 (3)	8.703 (8)	8.442 (9)
Illinois	8.501 (8)	7.988 (9)	8.432 (9)	8.681 (9)	8.367 (10)

Winner
First runner-up
Second runner-up
Third runner-up
Fourth runner-up
Top 10 semifinalist
(#) Rank in each round of competition

=== Preliminary Swimsuit ===
state	score	state	score	state	score	score	state	state	score	state	score
(Oklahoma) Oklahoma	8.887	(Maine) Maine	8.205	(New York (state)) New York	7.912	(Connecticut) Connecticut	7.773	(Washington (state)) Washington	7.587	(Rhode Island) Rhode Island	6.840
(Texas) Texas	8.872	(Maryland) Maryland	8.204	(Arkansas) Arkansas	7.885	(Michigan) Michigan	7.723	(Washington, D.C.) District of Columbia	7.573		
(Louisiana) Louisiana	8.715	(Iowa) Iowa	8.185	(Alabama) Alabama	7.883	(Missouri) Missouri	7.716	(Tennessee) Tennessee	7.516		
(Pennsylvania) Pennsylvania	8.704	(Kentucky) Kentucky	8.184	(South Dakota) South Dakota	7.881	(Idaho) Idaho	7.694	(North Dakota) North Dakota	7.504		
(Arizona) Arizona	8.696	(Colorado) Colorado	8.115	(Massachusetts) Massachusetts	7.877	(West Virginia) West Virginia	7.681	(Hawaii) Hawaii	7.486		
(Illinois) Illinois	8.491	(Wyoming) Wyoming	8.040	(Montana) Montana	7.874	(South Carolina) South Carolina	7.675	(Delaware) Delaware	7.340		
(California) California	8.428	(Nebraska) Nebraska	8.023	(Wisconsin) Wisconsin	7.844	(Minnesota) Minnesota	7.674	(Nevada) Nevada	7.177		
(Virginia) Virginia	8.384	(Mississippi) Mississippi	7.967	(Florida) Florida	7.821	(Ohio) Ohio	7.647	(New Mexico) New Mexico	7.152		
(North Carolina) North Carolina	8.324	(New Jersey) New Jersey	7.924	(Alaska) Alaska	7.803	(Vermont) Vermont	7.612	(Utah) Utah	7.050		
(Georgia (U.S. state)) Georgia	8.223	(New Hampshire) New Hampshire	7.915	(Kansas) Kansas	7.781	(Oregon) Oregon	7.592	(Indiana) Indiana	6.961		

== Judges ==
The following celebrities were invited to judge the competition:

- Jude Deveraux – Author
- Bonnie Kay – Modeling manager
- Dick Rutan – Pilot of the Voyager aircraft
- Jeana Yeager – Pilot of the Voyager aircraft
- Stella Stevens – Actress
- Roscoe Tanner – Tennis player
- Linda Shelton – Aerobics instructor
- Lillian Glass – Author
- Richard Anderson – Actor
- Cecilia Bolocco – Miss Universe 1987 from Chile
- Jennifer Chandler – Olympic diver

== Delegates ==
The Miss USA 1989 delegates were:

- Alabama - Sheri Mooney
- Alaska - Tina Marie Garaci
- Arizona - LeeAnne Locken
- Arkansas - Paige Yandell
- California - Christina Faust
- Colorado - Debbie James
- Connecticut - Lisa Vendetti
- Delaware - Terri Spruill
- District of Columbia - Somaly Sieng
- Florida - Jennifer Parker
- Georgia - Michele Nemeth
- Hawaii - Julie Larson
- Idaho - Kelli Bean
- Illinois - Kelly Holub
- Indiana - Gwen Rachelle Volpe
- Iowa - Marcy Requist
- Kansas - Nancy Burris
- Kentucky - Veronica Hensley
- Louisiana - Elizabeth Primm
- Maine - Kirsten Blakemore
- Maryland - Jackie Carroll
- Massachusetts - Kim Wallace
- Michigan - Karyn Finucan
- Minnesota - Julie Knutson
- Mississippi - Laura Leigh Durrett
- Missouri - Rhonda Hoglan
- Montana - Tammy Reiter
- Nebraska - Rene Harter
- Nevada - Janu Tornell
- New Hampshire - Fayleen Chwalek
- New Jersey - Deborah Lee Husti
- New Mexico - Traci Brubaker
- New York - Jennifer Fisher
- North Carolina - Jacqueline Padgett
- North Dakota - Carla Christofferson
- Ohio - Lisa Thompson
- Oklahoma - Jill Rene Scheffert
- Oregon - Jenifer Blaska
- Pennsylvania - Denise Epps
- Rhode Island - Debra Damiano
- South Carolina - Angela Shuler
- South Dakota - Nanette Endres
- Tennessee - Kimberly Payne
- Texas - Gretchen Polhemus
- Utah - Zanetta van Zyverden
- Vermont - Stacey Palmer
- Virginia - Kimberly Nicewonder
- Washington - Chiann Fan Gibson
- West Virginia - Kathy Eicher
- Wisconsin - Sherri Leigh Baxter
- Wyoming - Chandra Anderson
