= My Best Friend Is a Vampire =

1987 film by Jimmy Huston

- Theatrical release poster
- Directed by: Jimmy Huston
- Written by: Tab Murphy
- Produced by: Dennis Murphy
- Starring: Robert Sean Leonard; Cheryl Pollak; René Auberjonois; Evan Mirand; Fannie Flagg; Paul Willson; Cecilia Peck; David Warner
- Cinematography: James Bartle
- Edited by: Janice Hampton; Gail Yasunaga
- Music by: Steve Dorff
- Production company: Kings Road Entertainment
- Distributed by: Kings Road Entertainment
- Release dates: October 1, 1987 (West Germany); May 6, 1988 (United States)
- Running time: 89 minutes
- Country: United States
- Language: English
- Box office: $174,380

My Best Friend Is a Vampire (also known as I Was a Teenage Vampire) is a 1987 American comedy horror film directed by Jimmy Huston. The story revolves around Jeremy Capello, a newly made vampire who is trying to live as a "good" vampire and not feed on humans. Meanwhile, his parents have noticed changes in their son's lifestyle, but are under the mistaken impression that he is a closeted homosexual. Jeremy is played by Robert Sean Leonard with René Auberjonois as Jeremy's vampire guidance counselor Modoc and David Warner as a vampire hunter Professor Leopold McCarthy.

== Plot ==
Jeremy Capello (Robert Sean Leonard) is a typical American teenager from Houston, struggling with getting himself a girlfriend. Although he has caught the eye of his school's head cheerleader Candy Andrews (LeeAnne Locken), he has his attention fixed on his classmate and band geek Darla Blake (Cheryl Pollak), who in turn is unnerved by his constant staring at her.

Recently, Jeremy has been having some weird nightmares about a strange woman trying to seduce him, and later he actually encounters that woman named Nora (Cecilia Peck), who makes an obvious invitation to him, while delivering groceries. His skirt-chasing friend Ralph (Evan Mirand) convinces him to take up the opportunity for a first erotic experience. But the encounter goes badly: First the woman bites him in the neck, then two strangers burst into the house, forcing Jeremy to run for his life.

The next morning, Jeremy looks pale and does not feel well, and he sees in his father's newspaper that Nora's house has mysteriously burned down. Also, throughout the day he notices a strange man observing him. This man pops into his bedroom the very next night, introduces himself as Modoc (René Auberjonois) and carefully attempts to relay to Jeremy that Nora was a vampire and that he is now one, too (albeit a living one, not an undead). Jeremy is initially skeptical, but a sudden aversion to garlic, an increasing sensitivity to sunlight and craving for blood slowly convince him otherwise. His new vampire "life-style" hampers his attempts to start a relationship with Darla, who has finally become interested in him; otherwise Jeremy begins to adapt to the minor impacts the change has brought to his life. Modoc even gives him a guide book and explains to him that vampires are just like any other minority group that has been persecuted over the centuries.

Slowly, Jeremy's parents (Kenneth Kimmins and Fannie Flagg) notice that their son is behaving "most peculiarly" and begin to suspect that he may be a homosexual and that he is getting mixed up with bad company. To add to the ensuing confusion, the two men who had burst in on Jeremy's adventure are actually vampire hunters: Zealous professor Leopold McCarthy (David Warner) is determined to stop a "vampire armageddon" with the help of his feeble assistant Grimsdyke (Paul Willson). They are in the process of tracking their newest victim, but due to a mix-up they believe that Ralph is the vampire.

One night, when Jeremy finally begins to exploit his new capabilities and wins back Darla's trust, McCarthy and Grimsdyke kidnap Ralph and intend to "free his soul" in a small chapel. Jeremy and Darla arrive in time to save him, but then Jeremy is recognized as a vampire, and only his new-found power of hypnotism and the timely arrival of Modoc and Nora, who has come back from the dead, manage to save the day. Since McCarthy remains unrelenting, Modoc's female consorts turn McCarthy into a vampire, making a friend out of an enemy.

The film ends with the Capellos assuring Jeremy that they love him despite what he makes of himself. Jeremy then introduces Darla to his delightfully surprised parents, while Ralph just shakes his head at the whole hubbub.

== Cast ==
- Robert Sean Leonard as Jeremy Capello
- Cheryl Pollak as Darla Blake
- René Auberjonois as Modoc
- Evan Mirand as Ralph
- David Warner as Professor Leopold McCarthy
- Paul Willson as Grimsdyke
- Fannie Flagg as Mrs. Capello
- Kenneth Kimmins as Mr. Capello
- Cecilia Peck as Nora
- Kathy Bates as Helen Blake
- John Chappell as Buddy Blake
- LeeAnne Locken as Candy Andrews
- Michelle La Vigne as Flo
- Harvey Christiansen as George
- Erica Zeitlin as Gloria
- Amelia Kinkade as Brunette in Punk Bar

== Production notes ==
The film was shot in Houston, Texas, and LaPorte, Texas, and was initially announced under the title I Was a Teenage Vampire. This movie was released under the title I Was a Teenage Vampire in Australia.

== See also ==
- Vampire film
