= Full Frontal Fashion =

American television series

- Genre: News
- Written by: Krista Katsoulis
- Directed by: Bob Lampel
- Presented by: Ali Landry; Robert Verdi
- Narrated by: Betsy Foldes
- Country of origin: United States
- Original language: English
- No. of seasons: 6

Production
- Production company: Rainbow Media

Original release
- Release: 6 April 2002

Full Frontal Fashion is an American television program of the 2000s that gives complete coverage of designer fashion shows and other aspects of the fashion industry. It has aired on a variety of television channels and cable networks, especially those in the New York City area, showing Nick Steele and Ali Landry as themselves.

Full Frontal Fashion was co-created in 2000 by fashion television newcomer Robert Verdi, who also co-hosted it at the time, with the MSG Metro Channels as its original outlet. Produced in New York, the show was the first of its kind to air complete coverage of runway fashion shows, bringing the exclusive events into American living rooms. At first it only aired during New York Fashion Week, but then expanded coverage to other fashion weeks; after a while it aired around-the-clock on MSG's Metro Stories channel during fashion weeks, and then later it became the only programming on Metro Stories — all fashion, all the time. After Metro changed its programming (it would soon fold altogether), Full Frontal resurfaced sporadically on NYC Media's WNYE-TV, usually during New York Fashion Week. It also sometimes ran on WE: Women's Entertainment. By 2007, it found a new home on Voom HD's UltraHD channel, where it once again became the main programming, airing many times a day around the year. Since the Metro Stories days, the main hosts for the program have been Judy Licht, well known as a longtime entertainment reporter for New York local television stations WNYW-TV and WABC-TV, and Christina Ha, formerly of New York 1 News. Lloyd Boston, known for his commentating appearances on The Today Show, sometimes serves as a male correspondent.

At its core, Full Frontal Fashion replays fashion designers' shows unveiling new collections as they happened on the runway, typically taking place during one of the major fashion weeks. Most shows are covered with cameras trained on the turning point of the catwalk, capturing the runway models as they do their inimitable walks and then focusing a closeup on the clothes themselves, with no audio other than the shows' music. Interviews recorded right after the shows are often included, featuring the designer commenting on what inspired this latest collection and comments from fashion magazine editors and sometimes celebrities. In these latter cases, less of the show being covered is actually seen. Transitions between fashion shows are marked by a distinctive three-note electronic music clip. By 2007, programming had been tarted up a bit, with "Behind the Label" segments giving historical perspective to certain designers or aspects of the industry, and post-show graphics giving approval ratings from "front row" observers.

Other Full Frontal Fashion instantiations may exist, with different hosts. An apparent example is a Miami edition, with Cindy Taylor and James Aguiar (known for his rhinestone-encrusted microphone). High-profile coverage, such as for the New York Fashion Week for Spring 2008, attracted celebrity host Carmen Electra.

In January 2009, Full Frontal Fashion disappeared from television in what Mediabistro.com termed "horrible news". The problem was a complex business fallout between Rainbow Media Holdings, Voom HD Networks and Dish Network, that resulted in the Voom channels, including UltraHD, being dropped from Cablevision.

In September 2009, the Sundance Channel relaunched the "Full Frontal Fashion brand" as a web presence with some documentary programming. However all of the original show's creators and on-air talent were gone and the relaunch bore little resemblance to the original.
