= Beyond the Farthest Star (film) =

- Film poster
- Directed by: Andrew William Librizzi
- Written by: Andrew William Librizzi
- Produced by: Benjamin Dane; Sally Helppie; Andrew Librizzi; B. Scott Senechal
- Starring: Renee O'Connor; Todd Terry; Cherami Leigh; William McNamura; Tyler Corie; Barry Corbin
- Cinematography: Ron Gonzalez
- Edited by: James Burgess; Andrew William Librizzi
- Music by: Damon Criswell
- Production company: Pathlight Entertainment
- Distributed by: Sony Pictures Home Entertainment
- Release date: August 10, 2015
- Running time: 159 minutes
- Country: United States
- Language: English

Beyond the Farthest Star is a 2015 film directed by Andrew William Librizzi, based on the novel by Bodie & Brock Thoene.

== Cast ==
- Renee O'Connor as Maurene Wells
- Todd Terry as Adam Wells
  - Jaren Lewison as Young Adam Wells
- Cherami Leigh as Anne Wells
  - Emily Stuhler as Young Anne Wells
- Tyler Corie as Stephen Miller
  - Shane Shuma as Young Stephen Miller
- Shawn Roe as Kyle Tucker
  - Caden Gibson as Young Kyle Tucker
- William McNamara as Calvin Clayman
- Andrew Prine as Senator John Cutter
- Barry Corbin as Chief Burns
- Lou Beatty Jr. as Harrison
- Jordan Walker Ross as Clifford
- Andrew Sensenig as Holden Bitner
- Benjamin Dane as Jimmy Wilkens
- Jodie Moore as Jackson Tucker
- Gail Cronauer as Joycee Jones
- Selma Pinkard as Margaret Collier
- Stephanie Dunnam as Mrs. Harper
- Brooke Peoples as Susan
- LeeAnne Locken as Candace Cutter
- Sandy Baumann as Mrs. Wells
- Bill Jenkins as Adam's Father
- Garrett Schenek as The Mayor
- John McIntosh as The Principal
