= MSG Metro Channels =

Ownership
- Owner: Rainbow Media

History
- Launched: August 5, 1998; 28 years ago
- Closed: September 2005; 21 years ago
- Replaced by: SportsNet New York; News 12 Traffic & Weather

MSG Metro Channels was a series of local-minded New York City cable networks which launched on August 5, 1998, and closed in late 2005. Owned by Rainbow Media, the Metro networks were founded as a spinoff of the MSG sports network. The network was originally split into three separate channels, MSG MetroGuide, MSG MetroTraffic & Weather, and MSG MetroLearning Center. The tri-channel network was termed as "What to do, what to know, and how to get there" among similar billings and was an attempt by Rainbow Media to compete with newspapers and the internet for detailed coverage. Rainbow sought carriage in the mid- to high-teen numbers for the channels, so as to highlight that they "[fit] together like sections of a Sunday newspaper".

== MSG MetroGuide ==
MSG MetroGuide was a 24-hour entertainment and local venue guide to the Tri-State area. It offered local information on places to vacation, eat at, visit, and be a resource to local viewers in their hometown. It also featured six hours daily of arts and cultural programming from WNET. Ed Koch contributed some movie reviews as part of the programming. Other-on air talent included Bobby Rivers, Christina Ha, Ed Levine and Tinabeth Piña.

== MSG MetroTraffic & Weather ==
MSG MetroTraffic & Weather was the first sole traffic and weather channel in the tri-state area, and while local news networks and The Weather Channel offered weather news, the traffic component was the network's main feature.

MSG Metro Traffic & Weather originally began as News 12 Weather. In the early 1990s it would air in the mornings on most Cablevision systems in place of Bravo (which was owned by Rainbow, but sold to NBC Media in 2002 and later NBCUniversal) and E! when they shared a channel on Cablevision in the Long Island area. When Optimum TV launched in 1996, it got a full-time location in those areas. When the MSG MetroChannels launched in 1998, a traffic element was added to the channel and it became MSG MetroTraffic & Weather.

Currently, MSG MetroTraffic & Weather is the only MSG Metro channel still on the air. It became News 12 Traffic & Weather in 2005 and now goes by the name News 12+. The channel is available on Cablevision (now Optimum) systems on Channel 61 (97 on the former Service Electric system in Sparta acquired by Optimum).

== MSG MetroLearning Center ==
MSG MetroLearning Center actually began in the late 70s as a public service by Cablevision. Throughout the 80s and into the 90s, it aired as Extra Help on Long Island's TeLICare channel before finding its home on Long Island One in the early 90s. Long Island One featured mostly Public-access television cable TV shows, as well as a photo bulletin board detailing events on Long Island and was available on channel 1 on most Cablevision systems.

In the late spring of 1995, Cablevision "retooled" the show, improving its image for middle- and high-schoolers, and created an "adult-programming" block, which included shows on gardening, computers, cars, finance, and legal issues. Viewers were invited to "join the show" and ask questions by calling 1-800-EXT-HELP. The after-school programming featured a number of EJ's or educational jockeys who presented the different segments. Marissa Fenech, Mark Citorella, and Mark Kenny were among the first of this group. One of the High School geared segments, called "Peer to Peer," featured High School students answering questions from viewers; many of these early panelists went on to become EJ's themselves. Marc Morrone actually got his start on this channel hosting a show called Extra Help: Pets. This "retooling" was entrusted to Thomas Garger and Brad Dorsogna, executive producers, William L. Palminteri, production designer, Michael Zmuda, assistant production designer, Rocyna Yoingco and Kathleen Nugent, producers. Mr. Palminteri notes that the studio was re-designed from the ground up to accommodate the new series, and Rick Ruggles installed the new broadcast console. Numerous students from Hofstra University got their internship requirements fulfilled during this period, including Lorraine Buzzetta.

The approach to educational TV pioneered during this time has become the template for educational TV throughout the country. In 1997, Extra Help was expanded to 24 hours on weekdays, and the Long Island One branding was removed. On weekends, they would still show the Photo Bulletin Board, but the Cablevision logo was pasted over the Long Island One logo in the banner that showed up every five minutes telling viewers how to submit events. At the end of its first Spring Season (March 1995 to July 1995) Extra Help won a CableACE Award for Best New Educational Show Concept – 1995.

In 1998, Extra Help was rebranded to MSG MetroLearning Center; most of the shows initially survived the move and were now filmed from the MSG Metro set in New York City. The channel's homework help shows were now all merged under the banner School's Out which later became Studio Y, the flagship teen talk program for the networks. When the MSG name was dropped from the channels, the channel was renamed to MetroLearning.

After School's Out moved to MetroTV (formerly MetroGuide, the Learning element from the channel went with it. The channel still kept the MetroLearning name for a year or so, until it was renamed MetroStories. By this time the channel aired the show "MetroStories" back to back 24/7, which focused on the history of New York City, its people, and its sites. During New York Fashion Week, they would air nothing but Full Frontal Fashion on this channel. Eventually, Full Frontal Fashion was all this channel showed. By this time, Cablevision removed the channel from its analog lineup and replaced it with TV Land. MetroStories then went to Cablevision's digital cable service, iO on channel 174, where it would die, along with Metro in Summer 2005.

== Programs ==
=== Studio Y ===
Studio Y became the network's flagship program carrying the ratings. The series was a teen-oriented talk program which began with a hot topic and was discussed by the hosts and panelists. The meat of the show included interviews with celebrity guests, schoolwork discussion, musical acts (usually in the alternative rock range, including Cooter, Little T and One Track Mike, The Rosenbergs, Clearview 77, Dry Kill Logic), and movie/music reviews and general chat. What made the show unique is besides its two hosts, primarily Welly Yang and Leila Sbitani, it had a revolving set, usually four at a time, of local tri-state area high school students, which it recruited through high school principals. Many panelists were offered special opportunities to attend press junkets, which the network lucratively scored, for major motion pictures.

Studio Y began on MSG MetroLearning Center as School's Out, which was mainly an after school homework help program. Each day the show would have a different subject, School's Out: Math, School's Out: Science, School's Out: English, and School's Out: Social Studies. It brought in several teachers of different subjects each day, who used to have shows on the former Extra Help channel and offered live call-in homework help. The show moved to Metro, which had greater reach since it was also on Time Warner Cable and the show was renamed School's Out on Metro. Eventually, the learning element was removed entirely and the show was renamed Studio Y.

== MetroTV ==
MetroTV, previously known as MSG Metro Channel, was a mix of all three of the MetroChannels for Cablevision's systems that were not upgraded to Optimum TV yet. In the mornings they would air MSG MetroTraffic & Weather, during the day and weekends they would air MSG MetroGuide, and during the afternoon and at night they would air MSG MetroLearning Center. Most non-upgraded systems aired this channel on channel 1, Extra Help's old channel slot. When MetroGuide was rebranded as MetroTV, it took up most of the schedule on this channel; MetroTraffic & Weather continued in the mornings, but MetroLearning programming was bumped to late night. This channel has since ceased programming in 2005 with the demise of Metro. News 12 Traffic & Weather aired in its spot for a while, but it has since been replaced with SportsNet New York in those few systems that have not yet been upgraded to Optimum.

== Sports coverage and controversy ==
At the time the MSG Metro channels launched, Cablevision owned the local television rights to all seven MLB, NBA and NHL teams in the New York Metropolitan area. These games were regularly scheduled to air on MSG Network and FSN New York. When more than two teams played at the same time, Cablevision made those games available to cable systems with additional feeds such as MSG2 or FSN2. However, since these channels were not permanent channels, cable companies had to find an available channel or sometimes temporarily replace an existing channel to carry these additional feeds. Cablevision claimed that companies whose advertisements appeared during those sporting events were upset at the use of these additional feeds since it resulted in a lower number of viewers.

With the creation of the three new MSG Metro channels, Cablevision decided to place some of these "overflow" games on MetroGuide. These games were only available to subscribers who had the MetroChannels on their cable system, causing an uproar among area sports fans. Outside of Cablevision, few cable systems carried the Metro channels, since Cablevision would only sell all three channels together as a package. In addition, the programming on the MetroChannels was very Manhattan-specific and carried content thought to be of little interest to people who lived outside of the local New York City area. Satellite providers DirecTV and Dish Network did not carry Metro and therefore could not show every game of every local New York–area team. Time Warner Cable did reach a deal with Cablevision, but Comcast and MediaOne, with a total of 750,000 regional cable households, did not. The result was that a large percentage of households, mostly in New Jersey, were unable to watch the sporting events being broadcast on this channel.

Later in Metro's existence, there were days where a game was scheduled on MetroGuide (or later on, MetroTV) but not MSG or FSN, showing the monopoly that Cablevision had over local sports. The monopoly ended in 2002, when the New York Yankees and New Jersey Nets started the YES Network, lessening Cablevision's need to show pro games on Metro. The Mets would leave Cablevision and start their own network, SportsNet New York, at the end of the 2005 season. For the start of the 2005–06 NHL and NBA seasons, Cablevision revived MSG2 and FSN2 for overlapping games, which DirecTV and Dish Network carry.

== The rise and fall of MSG Metro ==
MSG Metro's suite did not bill success and had to make adaptations to stay alive. By 2000, MSG Metro merged Learning and Guide into the Guide, removing the Zagat-style programming, and the combined channel was simply named MetroTV. Key shows like Studio Y moved to MetroTV, and Learning evolved into a digital channel, MetroStories, which showcased biographical type programming premiered on MetroLearning. Soon after, MSG Metro dropped the MSG from the title and focused on the simple Metro logo for its networks.

By the end of 2000, Metro was spun with completely new programming and had added on more sports programming, including Game Face with Dave Sims. Management also hired new producers, who changed much of the programming including its flagship Studio Y and had deleted the panelists, focused on two new hip-hop hosts and converted the show to a hip-hop format. Both shows dissolved in early 2001. By 2002, Metro had joined with New York Magazine and thus, a new identity for Metro was in place, which basically eradicated the MetroStories channel. The partnership was designed to add more original shows, including Subway Q&A (a Q&A show based on the New York City Subway) and To Live and Date in New York (a dating show focusing on NY singles).

Ratings continued to not change, although most of the network's use was now focused on overflow sports coverage from MSG. In 2005, the MetroChannels disappeared for good, leaving only Metro Traffic & Weather to be the sole survivor, which was rebranded as part of the News 12 suite.

On November 2, 2026, it was announced that the renamed (as of 2019) News12+ cable channel would shut down, effective December 27, due to financial difficulties within Optimum, marking the official end of the last of the Metro Channels.
