= The Real Housewives of Dallas season 2 =

Season of television series

The Real Housewives of Dallas
- Season 2
- Cover used by iTunes (Left to right) Deuber, Simmons, Redmond, and Locken (Not pictured) Hollman and Westcott
- Starring: Cary Deuber; Stephanie Hollman; LeeAnne Locken; Brandi Redmond; D'Andra Simmons; Kameron Westcott
- No. of episodes: 14

Release
- Original network: Bravo
- Original release: August 14 – November 13, 2017

Season chronology
- ← Previous; Season 1 Next → Season 3

The second season of The Real Housewives of Dallas, an American reality television series, was broadcast on Bravo. It aired from August 14, 2017, until November 13, 2017, and was primarily filmed in Dallas, Texas. Its executive producers are Adam Karpel, Andrew, John Paparazzo, Rich Bye, Samantha Billett and Andy Cohen.

The second season focuses on the lives of Cary Deuber, Stephanie Hollman, LeeAnne Locken, Brandi Redmond, D'Andra Simmons and Kameron Westcott.

== Cast ==
The second season premiered with D’Andra Simmons and Kameron Westcott joining the cast, and Hendra appearing in a guest capacity.

== Episodes ==
The Real Housewives of Dallas season 2 episodes
No. overall	No. in season	Title	Original release date	U.S. viewers (millions)
12	1	"Look Who's Not Talking"	August 14, 2017	0.84
13	2	"Haute Dogs of Dallas"	August 21, 2017	0.69
14	3	"Face to Two Face"	August 28, 2017	0.80
15	4	"By Invitation Only"	September 4, 2017	0.85
16	5	"Walking in Memphis"	September 11, 2017	0.73
17	6	"Don't Cry Over Spilled Tea"	September 18, 2017	0.85
18	7	"Viva La Mexico"	September 25, 2017	0.83
19	8	"A Mouthful in Mexico"	October 2, 2017	0.80
20	9	"You’ve Yacht to be Kidding"	October 9, 2017	0.81
21	10	"Don't Cry Over Shattered Glass"	October 16, 2017	0.80
22	11	"Ladies Who Launch"	October 23, 2017	0.86
23	12	"The Beginning of the End"	October 30, 2017	0.80
24	13	"Reunion Part 1"	November 6, 2017	0.83
25	14	"Reunion Part 2"	November 13, 2017	0.89
