= Vasectomy: A Delicate Matter =

- Directed by: Robert Burge
- Written by: Robert Hilliard; Robert Burge
- Produced by: Robert Burge; Lou Wills
- Starring: Paul Sorvino; Cassandra Edwards; Abe Vigoda; Ina Balin; Lorne Greene
- Cinematography: Gary Thieltges
- Edited by: Beth Conwell
- Music by: Fred Karlin
- Production company: Vandom International Pictures
- Release date: September 26, 1986
- Running time: 92 minutes
- Country: United States
- Language: English

Vasectomy: A Delicate Matter is a 1986 film directed by Robert Burge and starring Paul Sorvino, Cassandra Edwards, Abe Vigoda, Ina Balin, and Lorne Greene.

== Premise ==
After his wife gives birth to their eighth child, a bank executive reluctantly consents to undergo vasectomy.

== Cast ==
- Paul Sorvino as Gino
- Cassandra Edwards as Anna
- Abe Vigoda as Detective Abe Fossi
- Ina Balin as Regine
- Lorne Greene as Theo Marshall
- Leonard D'John as Louis Marshall
- Wayne Powers as Vinnie
- Catherine Battistone as Mrs. Ellison
- John Moskoff as Francis
- Phyllis Doyle as Gloria Marshall
- Gary Raff as George
- June Wilkinson as Mrs. Cromwell
- Maggie Egan as Maggie Lane
- Suzanne Charny as Mildred
- Janet Wood as Marie
- Frank Aletter as Mr. Cromwell
- William Marshall as Dr. Dean

== Reception ==
Variety panned the film, noting "it is hard to imagine a film with less wit or commercial appeal", and criticizing its "washed-out look" and "errantic and confused" direction and editing.
