= The Real Housewives of Dallas season 5 =

Television season

The Real Housewives of Dallas
- Season 5
- Cover used by the iTunes Store
- Starring: Stephanie Hollman; Brandi Redmond; D'Andra Simmons; Kameron Westcott; Kary Brittingham; Tiffany Moon
- No. of episodes: 18

Release
- Original network: Bravo
- Original release: January 5 – May 11, 2021

Season chronology
- ← Previous; Season 4

The fifth season of The Real Housewives of Dallas, an American reality television series, is broadcast on Bravo. It premiered on January 5, 2021, and is primarily filmed in Dallas, Texas. Its executive producers are Adam Karpel, Andrew Hoegl, John Paparazzo, Rich Bye, Samantha Billett and Andy Cohen.

The Real Housewives of Dallas focuses on the lives of Stephanie Hollman, Brandi Redmond, D'Andra Simmons, Kameron Westcott, Kary Brittingham and Tiffany Moon.

On August 17, 2021, Bravo announced that it had no plans to immediately renew the series for a sixth season.

== Cast and synopsis ==
All housewives from the previous season returned, with the exception of original cast member LeeAnne Locken. The ladies are joined by physician Tiffany Moon as well as friend Jennifer Davis Long.

This season sees Brandi dealing with the consequences when a past video of her mocking the East Asian community is leaked and how this impacts her relationship with new housewife Tiffany. Stephanie decides to pursue a new charitable career whilst Kameron continues to search for her ideal home. D'Andra and Kary butt heads as both feel the other is responsible for the breakdown of their friendship.

== Episodes ==
The Real Housewives of Dallas season 5 episodes
No. overall	No. in season	Title	Original release date	U.S. viewers (millions)
61	1	"Bursting the Quarantine Bubble"	January 5, 2021	0.34
62	2	"You Dim Sum, You Lose Some"	January 12, 2021	0.54
63	3	"Kary'd Away"	January 19, 2021	0.55
64	4	"Whine Connoisseurs"	January 26, 2021	0.62
65	5	"Sour Grapes"	February 2, 2021	0.62
66	6	"Another One Bites the Crust"	February 9, 2021	0.54
67	7	"Getting Weird in Austin"	February 16, 2021	0.53
68	8	"Austin, We Have a Problem"	March 2, 2021	0.60
69	9	"The Doctor Is Out"	March 9, 2021	0.50
70	10	"A Simmons by Any Other Name"	March 16, 2021	0.61
71	11	"Mommy Dearests"	March 23, 2021	0.49
72	12	"RV Having Fun Yet?"	March 30, 2021	0.46
73	13	"Bigfoot, Bigger Drama"	April 6, 2021	0.49
74	14	"A Doggone Mess"	April 13, 2021	0.50
75	15	"Straight Outta the '80s"	April 20, 2021	0.55
76	16	"Southfork Goes South"	April 27, 2021	0.58
77	17	"Reunion Part 1"	May 4, 2021	0.37
78	18	"Reunion Part 2"	May 11, 2021	0.52
