= The Real Housewives of Dallas season 4 =

Television season

The Real Housewives of Dallas
- Season 4
- Cover used by the iTunes Store
- Starring: Stephanie Hollman; LeeAnne Locken; Brandi Redmond; D'Andra Simmons; Kameron Westcott; Kary Brittingham
- No. of episodes: 17

Release
- Original network: Bravo
- Original release: September 4, 2019 – January 8, 2020

Season chronology
- ← Previous; Season 3 Next → Season 5

The fourth season of The Real Housewives of Dallas, an American reality television series, is broadcast on Bravo. It premiered on September 4, 2019, and is primarily filmed in Dallas, Texas. Its executive producers are Adam Karpel, Andrew Hoegl, John Paparazzo, Rich Bye, Samantha Billett and Andy Cohen.

The Real Housewives of Dallas focuses on the lives of Stephanie Hollman, LeeAnne Locken, Brandi Redmond, D'Andra Simmons, Kameron Westcott and Kary Brittingham.

This season marked the final appearance of LeeAnne Locken.

== Episodes ==
The Real Housewives of Dallas season 4 episodes
No. overall	No. in season	Title	Original release date	U.S. viewers (millions)
44	1	"Of Friends and Frenemies"	September 4, 2019	0.68
45	2	"Roasted and Toasted"	September 11, 2019	0.63
46	3	"Donde Esta Margarita"	September 18, 2019	0.62
47	4	"Trash Talk"	September 25, 2019	0.56
48	5	"Worst Vacation Ever"	October 2, 2019	0.65
49	6	"Cirque d'Lingerie"	October 9, 2019	0.66
50	7	"Ghost Busted"	October 16, 2019	0.60
51	8	"Guess Who's Coming to Happy Hour?"	October 23, 2019	0.77
52	9	"A Mother of a Day"	October 30, 2019	0.68
53	10	"My Big Fat Dallas Wedding"	November 6, 2019	0.78
54	11	"My Life on the Dee List"	November 13, 2019	0.61
55	12	"Babes in Thailand"	November 20, 2019	0.66
56	13	"One Fight in Bangkok"	December 4, 2019	0.67
57	14	"Triggered in Thailand"	December 11, 2019	0.61
58	15	"Remember the Alamo"	December 18, 2019	0.60
59	16	"Reunion Part 1"	January 1, 2020	0.75
60	17	"Reunion Part 2"	January 8, 2020	0.77
