= The Real Housewives of Dallas season 3 =

Season of television series

The Real Housewives of Dallas
- Season 3
- Cover used by the iTunes Store
- Starring: Cary Deuber; Stephanie Hollman; LeeAnne Locken; Brandi Redmond; D'Andra Simmons; Kameron Westcott
- No. of episodes: 18

Release
- Original network: Bravo
- Original release: August 15 – December 12, 2018

Season chronology
- ← Previous; Season 2 Next → Season 4

The third season of The Real Housewives of Dallas, an American reality television series, is broadcast on Bravo. It aired from August 15, 2018, until December 12, 2018, and is primarily filmed in Dallas, Texas. Its executive producers are Adam Karpel, Andrew Hoegl, John Paparazzo, Rich Bye, Samantha Billett and Andy Cohen.

The Real Housewives of Dallas focuses on the lives of Cary Deuber, Stephanie Hollman, LeeAnne Locken, Brandi Redmond, D'Andra Simmons and Kameron Westcott.

This season marked the final regular appearance of Cary Deuber.

== Cast and synopsis ==
Following the conclusion of the second season, LeeAnne Locken began posting on social media that she would not be participating in the third season, following what she claimed to be "FALSE" portrayals of herself. Locken later clarified on the Reality Rundown podcast, stating she would return only if changes were made. She detailed: "The reality is I think that if we can put certain things in place then it certainly makes it to where you know everyone would feel comfortable moving forward. It's like when you go to start a new job, you have levels that you need to have met. If they can’t meet those levels, you're not going to sign on to go work there. It's the same thing for me. I have a few things that I'm done with. I’m done with this I'm dangerous storyline which is truly ridiculous. The only reason that those girls go so overboard with it is that they really truly believe that they can use that story-line to remove me from the show." Additionally, The Christian Post speculated that Brandi Redmond could also depart the series

On April 11, 2018, it was announced that the series would return for a third season. Two months later, on June 28, the third season was announced, with the entire lineup from the second season returning in full capacity, including Locken and Redmond.

== Episodes ==
The Real Housewives of Dallas season 3 episodes
No. overall	No. in season	Title	Original release date	U.S. viewers (millions)
26	1	"Your Amygdala Is Showing"	August 15, 2018	0.76
27	2	"Bubbles and Brooding"	August 22, 2018	0.75
28	3	"The Badger of Beaver Creek"	August 29, 2018	0.75
29	4	"God Save the Queen, B..."	September 5, 2018	0.74
30	5	"Rodeo Barbie"	September 12, 2018	0.72
31	6	"Smashing Friendships"	September 19, 2018	0.68
32	7	"Babes in Brandiland"	September 26, 2018	0.61
33	8	"Off the Leash"	October 3, 2018	0.65
34	9	"80's Ladies"	October 10, 2018	0.68
35	10	"Are You Saying I'm an Alcoholic?"	October 17, 2018	0.61
36	11	"A Recipe for Disaster"	October 24, 2018	0.67
37	12	"Where's Copenhagen?"	October 31, 2018	0.56
38	13	"Something is Rotten in Denmark"	November 7, 2018	0.65
39	14	"Growers and Show-ers"	November 14, 2018	0.60
40	15	"Game of Phones"	November 21, 2018	0.63
41	16	"Party Fouls"	November 28, 2018	0.67
42	17	"Reunion Part 1"	December 5, 2018	0.81
43	18	"Reunion Part 2"	December 12, 2018	0.66
