= Chiann Fan Gibson =

American dentist and beauty queen

- Born: Chiann Fan; April 20, 1968 (age 58); Tokyo, Japan
- Beauty pageant titleholder
- Title: Mrs United States 2005; Miss Hawaiian Tropic World Finalist 1997; American Dream Calendar Girl 1995; Miss Washington USA 1989; Washington’s Jr. Miss 1986
- Hair color: Brown
- Eye color: Brown

Chiann Fan Gibson (born April 20, 1968) is an American dentist and beauty queen who has held the titles of Mrs. United States 2005, Miss Hawaiian Tropic World Finalist (Miss Taiwan) 1997, American Dream Calendar Girl 1995, Miss Washington USA 1989 and Washington's Jr. Miss 1986. Chiann Fan was born in Tokyo, Japan, but is 100% Taiwanese in descent. She was naturalized in 1986 as a US citizen in Texas. Dr. Chiann Fan Gibson was chosen to compete (4 out of 3000 auditions chosen in Chicago, Illinois) to compete on ABC-TV modeling show, Are You Hot? 2003. Prize monies and scholarships Gibson won through pageantry helped pay for her childhood psychology degree from the University of Washington (1991) and Tufts University School of Dental Medicine, Boston, Massachusetts, where she obtained her doctorate of Dental Medicine in 1995. She serves as President of the American Academy of Cosmetic Dentistry.

== Early life and education ==
Gibson was born in Tokyo, Japan to Taiwanese parents. In 1971 Gibson immigrated with her family (twin sister Ping and sister Chen) to Texas to pursue the American Dream with less than $200. Struggling at first with both finances and the language barrier, they soon excelled with all 3 sisters graduating with honors / scholarships. In high school, Gibson worked at AstroWorld and a grocery store.

While attending the University of Washington, Gibson was also a 3-year cheerleader for the Washington Huskies while they won the national championship at the Rose Bowl.

== Professional career ==
Gibson currently practices Dentistry at Smiles By Dr. Gibson & Associates in Naperville, Illinois. Gibson served on the Board of Directors and was the President of the American Academy of Cosmetic Dentistry (AACD) through 2017. She is also a member of the American Society of Dental Aesthetics (ASDA), Academy of General Dentistry (AGD), American Dental Association (ADA), Illinois State Dental Society (ISDS), Chicago Dental Society (CDS), and the American Academy of Women Dentists (AAWD) where she was a feature story and on the Cover of Women Dentist Journal Magazine. (2006) Gibson was also featured on the cover of Dentistry Today magazine (2017). Gibson is a published author, including “Open Wide”, a former dental column featured in the Naperville Sun Newspaper and is also a featured national lecturer in the dental profession. "Open Wide" has come into such acclaim that the column was recently picked up by Hulu for a four-part docudrama starring Bob Costas as editor-in-chief.

In 2016, Gibson was named President of the American Academy of Cosmetic Dentistry, the third woman and first woman of Asian descent to do so.

=== Awards ===
In 1998 Miss Universe Co-owner Donald Trump awarded Gibson the “honorary” title of the official dentist of the Miss Universe Pageant. Trump's document states “Dr. Gibson is a dedication to the profession…and has the ability to create that perfect smile. She always turns my frown upside down." In 2006 Gibson was honored by Delta Delta Delta as being 1 of only 66 "Distinguished Delta Alumni" in its 108-year history.

=== Personal ===
Gibson is married to Emmy Award-winning TV host and entrepreneur Jim Gibson. Their wedding (1999) was held at the Mar-a-Lago estate of Donald Trump with Trump the signing witness on their wedding license. They have a son, James Keith Gibson III. Gibson is involved in numerous charitable foundations, often speaking on “The American dream is alive and well” and “The importance of proper dental healthcare”. Gibson resides in Sugar Grove, Illinois.
