= She's Got the Look =

- Official Show Logo
- Genre: Reality television
- Presented by: Kim Alexis (2008–2009); Brooke Burke (2010)
- Judges: Beverly Johnson (2008–2009); Robert Verdi (2008–2010); Sean Patterson (2008–2010); Roshumba Williams (2010)
- Country of origin: United States
- Original language: English
- No. of seasons: 3

Production
- Executive producers: Allison Grodner; Keith Cox; Sal Maniaci; Sean Patterson; Corey Preston
- Producers: Jeff Nucera; Brandon Panaligan; Ryan Simpkins
- Running time: 60 mins.
- Production companies: Allison Grodner Productions; Wilhelmina

Original release
- Network: TV Land
- Release: June 4, 2008 – September 29, 2010

She's Got the Look is a reality series created for and aired on TV Land. Hosted by model Kim Alexis, twenty women compete to become the next great supermodel 35 years or older. Celebrity judges, Robert Verdi, Sean Patterson and Roshumba Williams, whittle down the cast of twenty until they find the one who has 'the look'. Beverly Johnson was a judge for the first two seasons.

TV Land's nationwide search, which included months of online submissions, auditions and regional competitions in Los Angeles, Atlanta and New York City resulted in flying twenty contenders to New York. These semi-finalists were put to the test of expressing themselves and their fashion know-how. Ten finalists were then selected to live in a loft and compete in challenges such as photo shoots, runway competitions and tests on their fashion sense. At the conclusion of the competition, one woman is crowned the ultimate winner.

The series premiered on June 4, 2008 with six back-to-back episodes. A second season aired in 2009. Season three premiered on August 25, 2010. There are currently no plans to continue the show.

== Host and judges ==
- Brooke Burke, Model/TV Show Host. Burke brought her modeling experience to the show as the host of season three, replacing supermodel Kim Alexis.
- Roshumba Williams, Model/TV Reporter. Williams replaced Beverly Johnson as a judge in season three.
- Robert Verdi, Celebrity Stylist. Celebrated for his keen eye and witty commentary as the red carpet correspondent and fashion columnist, Verdi is also one of Hollywood's most sought-after stylists, whose clients include Eva Longoria and Hugh Jackman.
- Sean Patterson, President of Wilhelmina Models. Sean Patterson has helped launch and foster the careers of stars like Fergie, Mark Vanderloo and Gabriel Aubry.

== Season 1 ==
The winner receives a lucrative modeling contract with the world famous Wilhelmina Models, Inc and a photo spread for Self.

=== Judges ===
- Kim Alexis (Host)
- Beverly Johnson
- Robert Verdi
- Sean Patterson

=== Contestants ===
(ages stated are at time of contest)

Contestant	Age	Hometown	Finish	Place
Kathy	39	Suwanee, Georgia	Episode 2	10-9
Sharon Davis	63	Baldwin Hills, California	Episode 2	10-9
Paula Thomas	37	Los Angeles, California	Episode 3	8
Roxanne Ford	40	Las Vegas, Nevada	Episode 4	7-6
Melissa Todd	38	Los Angeles, California	Episode 4	7-6
Hope Toliver	35	New York City, New York	Episode 5	5
Celeste Johnson	51	Chicago, Illinois	Episode 6	4
Bahia Haifi	37	Beverly Hills, California	Episode 6	3
Karin Hallen	40	Los Angeles, California	Episode 6	2
Tanya Hutchison	45	Orange County, California	Episode 6	1

=== Call-out order ===
Order	Episodes							
Order	1	2 (Note: In episode 2, Kathy was called after Paula but was eliminated, leaving Hope, Karin, and Sharon uncalled. Sharon was ultimately eliminated among those three.)	3	4 (Note: In episode 4, Roxanne was called after Tanya but was eliminated, leaving Bahia, Hope, and Melissa uncalled. Melissa was ultimately eliminated among those three.)	5	6		
1	Roxanne	Bahia	Hope	Celeste	Bahia	Celeste	Tanya	Celeste
2	Celeste	Celeste	Tanya	Karin	Celeste	Tanya	Celeste	Tanya
3	Sharon	Tanya	Celeste	Tanya	Tanya	Bahia	Bahia	
4	Paula	Melissa	Melissa	Roxanne	Karin	Karin		
5	Kathy	Roxanne	Bahia	Bahia	Hope			
6	Karin	Paula	Karin	Hope				
7	Bahia	Kathy	Roxanne	Melissa				
8	Melissa	Hope	Paula					
9	Tanya	Karin						
10	Hope	Sharon						

The contestant won the leg-up challenge.
The contestant was eliminated.
The contestant won the reward challenge but was eliminated at the same episode
The contestant was eliminated outside of judging panel
The contestant won the competition.

== Season 2 ==
On September 16, 2008, TV Land announced casting for Season 2 of the series. Open casting calls were held in Los Angeles on September 29, 2008, in Dallas on October 2, 2008, in Chicago on October 6, 2008 and in New York City on October 8, 2008. On June 11, 2009, TV Land aired the first episode of Season 2. Eleven semi-finalists were chosen instead of the traditional ten.

The winner receives a lucrative modeling contract with the world famous Wilhelmina Models, a photo spread for Self magazine and a cash prize of $100,000.

=== Contestants ===
(ages stated are at time of contest)

Contestant	Age	Hometown	Rank
Laurie Seale	42	Dallas, Texas	11th (Quit)
Jacqueline Siebert	39	Los Angeles, California	10th
Raquel Riley	35	Clinton, Maryland	9th
Sandy Young	36	New York City, New York	8th
Rachel Paget	37	New Zealand	7th
Dolores De Vega	72	Los Angeles, California	6th-5th
Jamie Penrod	35	Hobart, Indiana	6th-5th
Shelly Marks	39	Sagamore Hills, Ohio	4th
LeeAnne Locken	41	Pasadena, Texas	3rd
Theresa Kalnins	47	La Canada, California	Runner-Up
Cindy Cohen	39	Calabasas, California	Winner

=== Call-out order ===
Order	1	2	3	4	5	6	7	8
1	Dolores	Dolores	Theresa	Cindy & Theresa	Dolores, Cindy & Theresa	Shelly	Cindy	Cindy
2	Jamie	LeeAnne	Sandy	Cindy & Theresa	Dolores, Cindy & Theresa	Cindy	LeeAnne	Theresa
3	Sandy	Rachel	LeeAnne	Dolores	Dolores, Cindy & Theresa	LeeAnne	Theresa	LeeAnne
4	Cindy	Theresa	Jamie	Jamie	Jamie	Theresa	Shelly	
5	Jacqueline	Jamie	Shelly	LeeAnne	LeeAnne	Jamie		
6	Laurie	Sandy	Dolores	Shelly	Shelly	Dolores		
7	Theresa	Shelly	Cindy	Rachel	Rachel			
8	Rachel	Raquel	Rachel	Sandy				
9	Raquel	Cindy	Raquel					
10	LeeAnne	Jacqueline						
11	Shelly	Laurie						

The contestant won the leg-up challenge.
The contestant was eliminated.
The contestant voluntarily withdrew from the competition.
The contestant won the competition.

- In Episode 1, ten semi-finalists were originally chosen to enter the competition, but Shelly was added as an eleventh semi-finalist.
- In Episode 4, the women performed as duos. Cindy and Theresa were jointly called first, then Rachel and Sandy were called forward as the bottom two, simultaneously revealing Dolores, Jamie, LeeAnne, and Shelly to be safe.
- In Episode 5, LeeAnne, Rachel, and Shelly were called forward as the bottom three, simultaneously revealing Cindy, Dolores, Jamie, and Theresa to be safe.
- In Episode 6, Dolores was called after Shelly but was eliminated, leaving Cindy, Jamie, LeeAnne, and Theresa as-then uncalled. Jamie was ultimately eliminated among those four.

== Season 3 ==
On August 25, 2010, TV Land aired the first episode of the new season of the series. Brooke Burke replaced Kim Alexis as the host for the third season and Beverly Johnson was replaced by Roshumba Williams. The cast was kept to the traditional ten contestants.

The winner receives a lucrative modeling contract with the world famous Wilhelmina Models, Inc and a photo spread for Self.

=== Contestants ===
(ages stated are at time of contest)

Contestant	Age	Hometown	Rank
Annie Batista	35	Brooklyn, New York	10th
Kathleen Neumann	41	Livonia, Michigan	9th
Kim Maier	37	—N/a	8th
Susan Master	54	Columbus, Ohio	7th
Diane Capozzi	39	Natick, Massachusetts	6th
Regina "Nina" Cash	43	Long Beach, California	5th
Jocelyn Williams	40	Round Rock, Texas	4th
Julie Love-Templeton	36	Tuscaloosa, Alabama	3rd
Rachelle Love	35	Memphis, Tennessee	Runner-Up
Marilin Archie	38	Los Angeles, California	Winner

=== Call-out order ===
Order	1	2	3	4	5	6	7	8	
1	Jocelyn	Nina	Julie	Marilin	Marilin	Julie	Rachelle	Rachelle	Marilin
2	Rachelle	Diane	Rachelle	Rachelle	Jocelyn	Marilin	Julie	Marilin	Rachelle
3	Annie	Susan	Kim	Nina	Julie	Rachelle	Marilin	Julie	
4	Julie	Rachelle	Diane	Diane	Nina	Jocelyn	Jocelyn		
5	Diane	Jocelyn	Marilin	Julie	Rachelle	Nina			
6	Kathleen	Kathleen	Jocelyn	Jocelyn	Diane				
7	Susan	Julie	Nina	Susan	Susan				
8	Kim	Marilin	Susan	Kim					
9	Nina	Kim	Kathleen						
10	Marilin	Annie							

The contestant was eliminated.
The contestant won the leg-up challenge.
The contestant won the leg-up challenge, but was eliminated.
The contestant won two leg-up challenges.
The contestant won the competition.

- In Episode 1 the casting call-out order was not shown. The table reflects the call-out order from the first elimination.
- In Episode 2, the women were given makeovers, but Jocelyn was reluctant to have her hair cut to a shorter length. Marilin won the leg-up challenge and was granted immunity from elimination. She chose to save her immunity for use later in the competition.
- In Episode 3 the women did a wire-suspension fashion show for their elimination challenge. Julie was afraid to do the challenge due to her fear of heights, but still chose to perform the task. Marilin used her immunity from elimination, granted to her in the previous episode.
- In Episode 4 after Marilin and Jocelyn were said to be safe, Diane, Julie, and Susan were called out. Susan was eliminated and Julie was said to be safe. Diane was eliminated, simultaneously revealing Nina and Rachelle to be safe.
- In Episode 6 Jocelyn, Julie, and Marilin were called out after Rachelle was safe, and Jocelyn was eliminated, simultaneously revealing Marilin and Julie to be safe.

== International version ==
Currently airing franchise
Franchise with an upcoming season
Franchise no longer airing

Region/country	Name of series	Network	Seasons & winners	Host(s)
Sweden	She's Got The Look	TV4	Season 1 - 2014: Jessica Gambhira Bergström	Jessica Almenäs
