= Struggle Well =

Studio album by Mouth of the South
- Released: August 5, 2014
- Genre: Christian metal, metalcore
- Length: 37:34
- Label: Facedown
- Producer: Matt McClellan

Struggle Well marks the first album from Mouth of the South. Facedown Records released the project on August 5, 2014. Mouth of the South worked with Matt McClellan on the production of this album.

== Reception ==
Professional ratings
Review scores
Source	Rating
Exclaim!	3/10
HM Magazine	3.5/5 stars
Indie Vision Music	4/5 stars
Jesus Freak Hideout	3.5/5 stars

Specifying in a three and a half star review by HM Magazine, Collin Simula responds, "It makes for a very intricate and exhausting listen, but when the ride is worth it, no one ever regrets going on it." Aaron Lambert, indicating in a three and a half star review from Jesus Freak Hideout, realizing, "In spite of the growth displayed on Struggle Well, Mouth of the South are still playing it safe." Signaling in a three out of ten review from Exclaim!, Bradley Zorgdrager retorts, "Struggle Well could be cleverly marketed as 'heavier than Hell,' but the deadweight's got Mouth of the South stuck in the fire of their namesake, where they're burning down." Brody B., writes in a four star review from Indie Vision Music, replying, "Mouth of the South create an impressive debut record on Facedown. While it does not break the mold of what to expect from the modern metalcore genre, 'Struggle Well' takes a few steps in the right direction providing interesting spoken word sections, creative songwriting, and a gritty vibe."

== Track listing ==
No.	Title	Length
1.	"Blind Guides"	4:06
2.	"Running Scared"	2:54
3.	"Dry Bones"	3:10
4.	"Good Intentions"	4:01
5.	"Simply Grace"	5:09
6.	"Idle Hands"	3:47
7.	"Hollow Veins"	4:19
8.	"Endless Cycle"	2:19
9.	"Porcelain Faith"	4:39
10.	"Nameless Faceless"	3:10
Total length:		37:34

== Charts ==
Chart (2014)	Peak position
US Christian Albums (Billboard)	28
US Heatseekers Albums (Billboard)	18
