= Rival Choir =

American post-hardcore/metalcore band

- Also known as: Mouth of the South
- Origin: Denton, Texas
- Genres: Christian hardcore, post-hardcore, metalcore
- Years active: 2007–2018
- Labels: Facedown
- Members: Juan Pardo; Christian Prince; Daniel Mackey; Colton Bartholet; Garrett Metzger

Rival Choir, formerly known as Mouth of the South, was an American Christian post-hardcore and metalcore band from Denton, Texas formed in 2007. The band signed with Facedown Records in January 2014. Struggle Well was the band's last album under the name Mouth of the South. After announcing their change from Mouth of the South to Rival Choir, their new album—I Believe, Help My Unbelief—was released on February 5, 2016, also by Facedown Records. On November 18, the band released the debut single from the new album, entitled "Aftermath".

== Members ==
Current

- Juan Pardo - vocals
- Christian Prince - guitar
- Daniel Mackey - guitar
- Colton Bartholet - bass
- Garrett Metzger - drums

Former

- Mike Butler - guitar
- Tanner Allen - guitar
- Kane Taliaferro - drums
- Josh Davis - drums
- Alex Knight - bass
- Will Fordyce - guitar
- Luke Andrews - vocals
- Josiah Lyle - vocals
- Justin Davis - vocals

== Discography ==
Studio albums

List of studio albums, with selected chart positions
Title	Album details	Peak chart positions	
Title	Album details	US Christ	US Heat
Transparency	Released: July 2, 2013; Label: Independent; Format: CD, digital download	—	—
Struggle Well	Released: July 22, 2014; Label: Facedown Records; Format: CD, digital download	28	18
I Believe, Help My Unbelief	Released: February 5, 2016; Label: Facedown Records; Format: CD, Digital		

EPs

- Abolisher (2009, Independent)
- Manifestations (2010, Independent)
- Of Dust (2012, Independent)
