= News 12 Networks =

American regional cable TV news networks

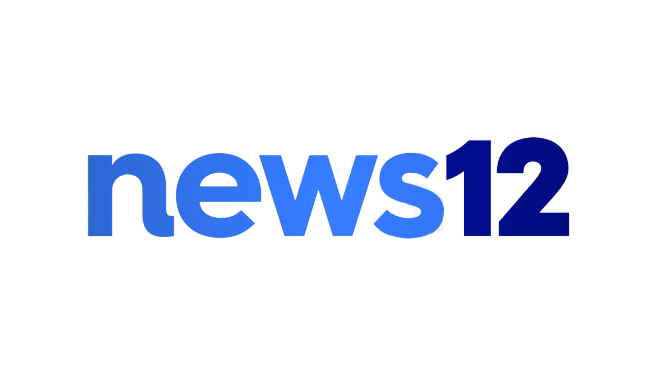
- Country: United States
- Broadcast area: Local (Long Island, Hudson Valley, Connecticut, New Jersey, Bronx, Brooklyn)

Programming
- Language: English
- Picture format: 1080i (HDTV); 480i (SDTV)

Ownership
- Owner: Optimum Communications
- Sister channels: News 12+

History
- Launched: December 15, 1986; 39 years ago

Links
- Website: www.news12.com

Availability

Terrestrial
- WACP (Atlantic City): 4.1 (6 AM – 9 AM weekdays)

The News 12 Networks are a group of regional cable news television channels in the New York metropolitan area that are owned by Optimum Communications. All channels provide rolling news coverage 24 hours a day, focusing primarily on regions of the metro area outside Manhattan, Queens, and Staten Island.

== History ==
News 12 Networks's logo used from 2007 until 2019.

The first of the channels, News 12 Long Island, was launched by Cablevision on December 15, 1986, to customers on its Long Island system, as the first 24-hour regional cable news service in the United States. Over the years Cablevision expanded the reach of News 12 by adding additional networks across its footprint.

The network was formerly operated by Newsday Media Holdings and presided over by Patrick Dolan, son of Newsday majority owner Charles Dolan and brother of James L. Dolan. Altice USA, who bought Cablevision in 2016, retained Dolan as a senior network advisor.

In December 2005, News 12 Networks generated criticism when it changed its website and mobile app to a pay subscription service for those who live outside the News 12 viewing area. The News 12 website is offered free of charge to subscribers of Optimum, Spectrum or Xfinity. This has been used as a marketing tool against customers signing up for Verizon FiOS, or satellite providers DirecTV or Dish Network, which are available in many of the areas News 12 covers. At one point Cablevision even made the network's slogan, "Only on Cable. Never on FiOS. Never on satellite." (In some ads, FiOS was substituted with "phone company television" and in most areas, "Cable" was substituted with Cablevision in areas where Cablevision was only provided as a cable provider, notably Long Island). In response, Verizon FIOS partnered with RNN to create FiOS1 News in June 2009 and later expanded to the Lower Hudson Valley in 2014, which could be viewed only by FiOS customers. Unlike News 12, FiOS1's website was not behind a paywall and was open to all users, with only its live broadcast restricted to FiOS customers.

In October 2016, newspaper reports stated News 12 was consolidating its Westchester and Connecticut News operations, moving news anchor desks and studio operations to New Jersey and Long Island, and news and production staff at these operations would be laid off. Reports indicated Westchester News Director Janine Rose was dismissed, and Connecticut News Director Tom Appleby was dismissed. Longtime emterologist Joe Rao resigned after the studios moved from Yonkers to Bethpage, New York.

By August 2017, the seven News 12 Network cable channels began airing Cheddar's news summary segments.

In April 2018, Altice announced that it would form a new division named Altice USA News (renamed to Altice News after Cheddar acquisition) that would consist of News 12 and I24NEWS. The division was headed by Michael Schreiber now succeeded by Jon Steinberg.

Altice has departed from Cablevision's long-standing policy of ensuring that News 12 remained exclusive to cable. In July 2019, Altice began to simulcast News 12 on WACP in Atlantic City, New Jersey, between 6 a.m. and 9 a.m. every weekday morning. Beginning on November 4, 2019, Verizon FiOS began carrying News 12 and News 12+. They were meant to replace FiOS1, which shut down 9 days later. Verizon later added sister networks i24News and Cheddar in early 2020. Altice USA revamped News 12 networks by consolidating newsrooms of the Bronx, Brooklyn, Connecticut and Westchester into a unified regional broadcast in July 2026.

== Networks ==
Network	Launch Date	Headquarters
News 12 Long Island	December 15, 1986	Huntington, New York
News 12 Westchester	October 1995	Yonkers, New York
News 12 New Jersey	March 17, 1996	Edison, New Jersey
News 12 Connecticut	July 1996	Norwalk, Connecticut
News 12 The Bronx	June 1998	Soundview, New York
News 12 Brooklyn	June 14, 2005	Greenwood Heights, New York
News 12 Hudson Valley	June 14, 2005	West Nyack, New York
