= Big Rich Texas =

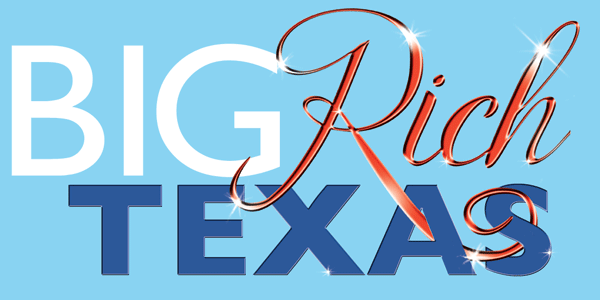
- Genre: Reality
- Starring: Pamela Martin Duarte; Hannah Duarte; Connie Dieb; Grace Dieb; Leslie Birkland; Kalyn Braun; Melissa Poe; Maddie Poe; Bonnie Blossman; Whitney Whatley; DeAynni Hatley; Shaye Hatley; Amber Hatley; Cindy Davis; Alex Davis; Heidi Dillon; LeeAnne Locken; Wendy Walker; Nikki Walker
- Country of origin: United States
- Original language: English
- No. of seasons: 4
- No. of episodes: 40

Production
- Executive producers: Allison Grodner; Merah Chung; Rich Meehan; Sarah Weidman
- Running time: 40-43 minutes
- Production company: Fly on the Wall Productions

Original release
- Network: Style Network
- Release: July 17, 2011 – January 30, 2014

Related
- Big Rich Atlanta

Big Rich Texas is an American reality television series on the Style Network that premiered on July 17, 2011. The show is filmed in the Dallas/Fort Worth area of Texas. The series follows five wealthy Texas women and their daughters. The first season of the show premiered on July 17, 2011 following a spin off from the show Dallas Divas and Daughters that originally aired in 2009 on Bravo TV and The Style Network. The second season debuted February 19, 2012 with new cast members: Deaynni, Amber and Shaye Hatley. In 2014 Season 4 was green lit and ready for production. The network negotiated bringing back Pamela Martin-Duarte and a new cast, with co star Bon Blossman and her daughter Whitney moving on to Whitney's Having a Baby. Subsequently Big Rich Texas season 4 was put on hold due to the decision by NBC Universal to replace the Style Network with the Esquire Network in order to increase their much needed programming for men. 3000 jobs were cut out at Style due to the channel's changes.

== Cast ==
- Pamela Martin Duarte and her daughter Hannah Duarte
- Connie Dieb and her daughter Grace Dieb
- Leslie Birkland and her goddaughter Kalyn Braun
- Melissa Poe and her daughter Maddie Poe
- Bonnie Blossman and her daughter Whitney Whatley
- DeAynni Hatley and her daughters Amber and Shaye Hatley
- Cynthia Davis and her daughter Alex Davis
- Wendy Walker and her daughter Nikki Walker

=== Timeline of cast members ===
Main cast (appears in opening credits)
Secondary cast (appears in green screen confessional segments, reunion segments and/or in end credits alongside the main cast)
Guest cast (appears in a guest role or cameo)

Main cast members
Cast member	Seasons			
Cast member	1	2	3	4
Pamela Martin Duarte	Main	Main		
Hannah Duarte	Main	Main		
Connie Dieb	Main	Main	Friend	
Grace Dieb	Main	Main	Guest	
Leslie Birkland	Main	Main	Main	
Kalyn Braun	Main	Main	Main	
Melissa Poe	Main	Main	Main	
Maddie Poe	Main	Main	Main	
Bonnie Blossman	Main	Main	Main	Main
Whitney Whatley	Main	Main	Main	Main
DeAynni Hatley		Friend	Main	
Shaye Hatley		Friend	Main	
Amber Hatley		Friend	Main	
Cindy Davis			Main	
Alex Davis			Main	
Supporting cast members
Heidi Dillon	Guest	Friend	Friend	
LeeAnne Locken		Friend	Friend	
Wendy Walker			Friend	
Nikki Walker			Friend	

== Episodes ==
=== Series overview ===
Season	Episodes	Originally released	
Season	Episodes	First released	Last released
1	10	July 17, 2011	October 2, 2011
2	12	February 19, 2012	April 29, 2012
3	12	October 7, 2012	January 16, 2013
4	6	January 30, 2014	

=== Season 1 (2011) ===
No. overall	No. in season	Title	Original release date
1	1	"Welcome to the Club"	July 17, 2011
2	2	"Beauty Queen Drop-Out"	July 24, 2011
3	3	"Brawling Beauty Queens"	July 31, 2011
4	4	"Model Meltdown"	August 7, 2011
5	5	"Brat Attack"	August 14, 2011
6	6	"Texas Throwdown"	August 28, 2011
7	7	"Gunning for Trouble"	September 4, 2011
8	8	"My Mom Stole My Crown"	September 18, 2011
9	9	"Whit's End"	September 25, 2011
10	10	"The Cougar Trap"	October 2, 2011

=== Season 2 (2012) ===
No. overall	No. in season	Title	Original release date
11	1	"Texas Shootout"	February 19, 2012
12	2	"Not So Sweet 16"	February 26, 2012
13	3	"Country Clubbed"	March 4, 2012
14	4	"Bride & Doom"	March 11, 2012
15	5	"Cheer Momster"	March 18, 2012
16	6	"Texas Millionaire Manhunt"	March 25, 2012
17	7	"Siblings With Benefits"	April 1, 2012
18	8	"Miss Conception"	April 8, 2012
19	9	"Bonnie-Plasty"	April 15, 2012
20	10	"Join the Club"	April 22, 2012
21	11	"Clash of the Texans"	April 29, 2012
22	12	"Big Rich Texas Tell-All"	May 6, 2012

=== Season 3 (2012-13) ===
No. overall	No. in season	Title	Original release date
23	1	"Botox and Billionaires"	October 7, 2012
24	2	"Crabby Bitches"	October 14, 2012
25	3	"Pierced by Revenge"	October 21, 2012
26	4	"Cowboy Crazy"	October 28, 2012
27	5	"Immaculate Infection"	November 4, 2012
28	6	"Meet the Boogers"	November 11, 2012
29	7	"Engaged and Enraged"	November 18, 2012
30	8	"Big Easy Blowup"	December 2, 2012
31	9	"If Cooks Could Kill"	December 9, 2012
32	10	"Battle of the Bull"	December 16, 2012
33	11	"Season 3 Reunion Special: Part 1"	January 9, 2013
34	12	"Season 3 Reunion Special: Part 2"	January 16, 2013

=== Season 4: Whitney's Having a Baby (2014) ===
No. overall	No. in season	Title	Original release date
35	1	"Whitney's Having a Baby"	January 30, 2014
36	2	"Whitney's Fake Baby"	January 30, 2014
37	3	"Whitney's Pain in the Birth"	January 30, 2014
38	4	"Bonnie's Shower Makes Whitney Sour"	January 30, 2014
39	5	"Bonnie the GILF"	January 30, 2014
40	6	"Big Rich Baby"	January 30, 2014
