= Tiffany Hendra =

Actress and television personality

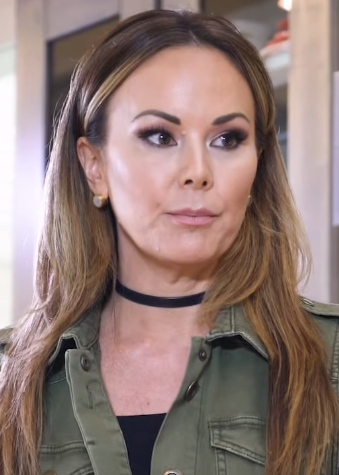
- Hendra in 2017
- Born: Tiffany Bolton; August 21, 1971 (age 53); Channelview, Texas, U.S
- Occupations: Television personality; Actress; Model
- Television: The Real Housewives of Dallas
- Spouse: Aaron Hendra (m. 2004)

Tiffany Hendra (née Bolton; born August 21, 1971) is an American actress and television personality best known for the Bravo reality-television show The Real Housewives of Dallas.

== Life and career ==
Hendra was born in Channelview, Texas, a Houston suburb. She worked as a fashion model throughout Europe and the US before becoming an actress and spokesperson. She started in television doing sketches on The X Show on FX and went on to co-host two seasons of the Comedy Central show Beat the Geeks, airing in 2001 and 2002. Hendra was a regular on NBC's Spy TV. She starred in the Cinemax erotic-drama series Black Tie Nights and the Bravo reality-television show The Real Housewives of Dallas.

Bolton married to rock musician Aaron Hendra in February 2004. She is the sister of Survivor: Micronesia - Fans vs. Favorites fourth-place finisher Natalie Bolton.
