= List of programs broadcast by Lifestyle/Metro Channel =

Below is a partial list of shows that were previously aired by Lifestyle Network and Metro Channel. For programs currently airing, see List of programs broadcast by Metro Channel.

== Programs ==
=== Metro Channel & Lifestyle-produced Programs ===
- Amanda Loving Life
- Curiosity Got The Chef (2014–2018)
- F.A.S.H. (Fashion And Style Hub) (2010)
- Fashion Nation (2008)
- Foodprints
- Good Finds
- InSight (2008)
- Interior Motives
- Leading Ladies
- Listed
- Metabeats (2016–2018)
- MomWorks (2008)
- Sharon At Home (2010)
- The Modern Girls (2016)
- The Scene

=== Non-Metro Channel- & Lifestyle-produced Programs ===
- Belo Beauty 101
- Behind the Brand: The Philippine Fashion Week TV
- Chefscapades
- Everyday Creations
- Market to Master
- Philippine Realty TV
- Runway TV
- Sabrina's Kitchen
- San Miguel Purefoods Kwentong Kusina Kwentong Buhay

=== Home & Living ===
Formerly known as HGTV, DiY Network and Home on Lifestyle.

- 24 Hour Design
- A Gardener's Diary
- A-List Listings
- At Home With
- Awesome Interiors
- Bed & Bath Designs
- Beyond the Box
- Buying Asia
- Built
- Carter Can
- Celebrity House Hunting
- Clean House
  - Clean House Come Clean
  - Clean House New York
- Color Splash
- Consumed
- Country Dreams
- Cousins Undercover
- Crafts
- Creative Juice
- Decorating Cents
- Deserving Design
- Design Addict
- Design Touch
- Design Wars
- Designer Guys
- Designer Finals
- Embellish This
- FreeStyle
- Get Color
- Get It Together
- HGTV Design Star
- HGTV Showdown and HGTV Summer Showdown
- Hotel Hell
- How Clean Is Your House?
- If Walls Could Talk
- Intérieurs
- Interior By Design
- International Open House
- Jewelry Making
- Living Abroad
- Katie Brown
- Martha Stewart Living
- Million Dollar Contractor
- Million Dollar Listing Los Angeles
- Million Dollar Listing New York
- Mission: Organization
- Outer Spaces
- Picker Sisters
- Property Envy
- Scrapbooking
- Secrets From a Stylist
- Sensibly Chic
- Style Department
- Summer Home
- The Amandas
- The Antonio Treatment
- The Art Show
- The Carol Duvall Show
- The Fabulous Beekman Boys
- The Fix
- The Martha Stewart Show
- The Whole Picture
- Treasure Makers
- Walls at Work

=== Food & Travel ===
Formerly known as Food Network, Fine Living, Limelight, Tripping and Food on Lifestyle.

- 30 Minute Meals
- 4 Ingredients
- A Very Hungry Frenchman
- All That's Fit
- All-Girl Getaways
- Alternate Route
- Ace of Cakes
- Around The World with Mamu
- Ayesha's Home Kitchen
- Back to Basics
- Barefoot Contessa
  - Barefoot Contessa: Back to Basics
- Bazaar
- Behind the Bash
- Bill's Food
- Bill's Holiday
- Blue List
- Bobby Flay's BBQ Adicttion
- Boy Meets Grill
- Breathing Room
- Brunch @ Bobby's
- Chocolate Covered
- Cutthroat Kitchen
- Ciao America with Mario Batali
- Chefs vs. City
- Closet Cases
- Corner Table with Bill Boggs
- Cupcake Wars
- Date Plate
- Delicious Iceland
- Dining in Style
- Eat St.
- Essence of India with Samira
- Essential
- Ever Wondered About Food
- Everyday Italian
- Forbes Luxe 11
- How to Cook Well
- I Want Your Job
- Kitchen Nightmares (Season 1 to 5)
- Mad Hungry
- Martha Bakes
- Martha's Cooking School
- East Meets West
- Emeril Live
- Essence of Emeril
- Everyday Baking
- Everyday Food
- Everyday Gourmet
- Everyday Italian
- Extreme Cuisine
- Fine Living Specials
- From Martha's Kitchen
- Flavours of Greece
- Flavours of Peru
- Flavours of Spain
- Food 911
- Food Essay
- Food Fight
- Food Safari
- Gordon Ramsay's Ultimate Home Cooking
- Giada at Home (2018)
- Giada in Italy
- Giada's Weekend Getaways
- Globe Trekker
- Gok Cooks Chinese
- Gordon's Great Escape
- Good Eats
- Great Cocktails
- Grillin' & Chillin'
- Healthy Appetite with Ellie Krieger
- Heston's Feast
- Hot Off The Grill
- Ian Wright: Out of Bounds
- In Search of Perfection
- Indian Food Made Easy
- Inside Dish
- Iron Chef America
- Jamie's Great Italian Escape
- Jamie's Kitchen
- Jamie's Kitchen: Australia
- Julian and Camilla's World Odyssey
- Kimchi Chronicles
- Lonely Planet Six Degrees: China
- Lorraine's Fast, Fresh and Easy Food
- Lost in Italy
- Mario Eats Italy
- Market Values
- Martha Stewart's Cooking School
- Masterchef U.S.
- Mexican Food Made Simple
- Ming's Quest
- Molto Mario
- My Country, My Kitchen
- My Ireland with Collin
- My France with Mamu: Paris to Strasburg
- Napa Style
- Nigella Bites
- Oliver's Twist
- Pairings with Andrea
- Party Line with The Hearty Boys
- Peta Unplugged
- Peta Unplugged: 10 Recipes For Summer Entertaining
- Pizza Masters
- Quick Fix Meals
- Rachael Allen's Cake Diaries
- Rachael Ray
- Rachael's Vacation
- Radical Sabbatical
- Rick Stein's India
- Ride with Mr. Wright
- Road and Track
- Samantha Brown: Passport to Europe
- Sea Nation
- Secret Gardens with Chef Du Jour
- Shiela Bridges: Designer Living
- Sicily with Aldo and Enzo
- Simply Wine
- Spice Trip
- Sugar Rush
- Sweet Dreams
- Sweet Genius
- Taste the Wine
- The Art of Cooking with Mimi
- The Best Things I Ever Ate
- The Delicious Ms. Dahl
- The Emeril Lagasse Show
- The F Word
- The Genuine Article
- The Good Cook
- The Great Adventure
- The Great British Bake-Of: Masterclass (season 6) (2018)
- The Great Food Truck Race
- The Hairy Bikers' Cookbook
- The Kitchen (Season 2)
- The Kitchen Musical
  - The Boston: The Kitchen Musical
- The Next Food Network Star
- The Next Iron Chef
- The Originals with Emeril
- The Other Side
- The Pioneer Woman
- The Shopping Detective
- The Taste (Season 1 and 2)
- The Well-Seasoned Traveler
- This is Brazil
- Throwdown! with Bobby Flay
- Trip of a Lifetime
- Tom Daley Goes Global
- Too Hot Tamales
- Two Greedy Italians
- Tyler's Ultimate
- Unwrapped
- Ultimate Kitchens
- Wolfgang Puck
- Wolfgang Puck: Cooking Class
- Worst Cooks in America (Seasons 1 to 4)
- Your Private Island

=== Fashion & Style ===
Formerly known as In Style, Limelight, Metro TV and Self on Lifestyle.

- 10 Ways
- Alter Eco
- BTVR
- Bank of Hollywood
- Biography
- Bolly Blast
- Breakthrough with Tony Robbins
- Bringing Up Baby
- Cheer Perfection
- Co-Ed Training
- Dance Off The Inches
- Dress My Nest
- Dresscue Me
- E! News Weekend
- E! True Hollywood Story
- Extreme
- Extreme Makeover: Home Edition
- Fashion Trance
- Finding Sarah
- Fitness Beach
- Flipping Out
- Glam Fairy
- Glamour UK: 50 Best Dressed List
- Gone Bad
- Grand Designs Abroad
- Grow Your Own Drugs
- Guess Who's Coming to Decorate?
- Giuliana and Bill
- Homemade Millionaire
- How Do I Look?
- How to Look Good Naked (UK Version)
- I Do Diaries
- I Propose
- Iconoclasts
- In the Bedroom
- Instant Beauty Pageant
- Intimate Portrait
- Isaac
- It's a Brad, Brad World (Season 2)
- Jerseylicious
- Kidnapped by the Kids
- Kimora: Life in the Fab Lane
- Kylie Kwong: My China
- Life & Style
- Love/Lust
- Making Over America with Trinny and Susannah
- Martha Stewart Living
- Mary Queen of Frocks
- Mary Queen of Shops
- Merge
- Model TV
- Mrs. Eastwood & Company
- My Celebrity Home
- My Shopping Addiction
- Next Door with Katie Brown
- Oprah's Big Give
- Peter Perfect
- Real Simple Real Life
- Revealed with Jules Asner
- Roseanne's Nuts
- Royal Inquest
- Ruby
- Say No to The Knife
- Searching For
- Second Look
- Seriously Funny Kids
- Split Ends
- She's Got the Look
- Style by Jury
- Style Her Famous
- Style Star
- Stylemaker
- Tacky House
- The Big Party Plan Off
- The Brini Maxwell Show
- The Conversation with Amanda de Cadenet
- The Doctors
- The Early Show
- The Fashionista Diaries
- The Great Sewing Bee
- The Janice Dickinson Modeling Agency (Seasons 1 & 2)
- The Look for Less
- The New Fitness Collection
- The Newlyweds
- The Right Fit
- The Supersizers...
- The Truth About Sexes
- Toned Up
- Trinny & Susannah Undress...
- Videofashion News
- Videofashion Specials
- What Not to Wear
- What Not to Wear (U.S.)
- Whatever, Martha!
- What I Hate About Me
- What's Good For You
- Whose Wedding Is It Anyway?
- Wild On!
- Yoga For Life
- You're Invited

(hook-up with, Limelight TelevisionandBY/Lifetime Television)

=== Entertainment & Glamour ===
Formerly known as Limelight and Entertainment

- 3
- A Chance to Dance
- Bet on Your Baby
- Chasing Life
- Dance Moms
- Downton Abbey
- Full Circle
- Lifestyle Presents
- Lindsay
- Made in Chelsea (Season 5 to 7)
- Medici: Masters of Florence
- OTRC (On The Red Carpet)
- Playing House (Season 1)
- Pretty Wicked Moms
- Princesses: Long Island
- The Borgias
- The Ladies' Paradise
- The Real Housewives of Beverly Hills
- The Real Housewives of Miami
- The Time in Between
- The Veiled Lady
- Young Hollywood's Greatest

=== Special Coverage ===
- The Royal Wedding of the Century (April 29, 2011 – official provider in partnership with BBC Worldwide)
- Academy Awards (2014)
- Fashion Rocks (September 10, 2014)
- Annual Tony Awards (2014–2017)
  - 68th Tony Awards (June 14, 2014)
  - 69th Tony Awards (June 9, 2015)
  - 70th Tony Awards (June 13, 2016)
  - 71st Tony Awards (June 17, 2017)
- Primetime Emmy Awards (2014–present)
  - 66th Annual Primetime Emmy Awards (August 26, 2014)
  - 67th Annual Primetime Emmy Awards (September 21, 2015)
  - 68th Annual Primetime Emmy Awards (September 19, 2016)
  - 69th Annual Primetime Emmy Awards (September 18, 2017)
- Screen Actors Guild Awards (2016–present)
  - 22nd Screen Actors Guild Awards (February 1, 2016)
  - 23rd Screen Actors Guild Awards (January 30, 2017)
  - 24th Screen Actors Guild Awards (January 22, 2018)

== TV specials ==
- METROWear Icon Rajo Laurel: The TV Special (June 22, 2013)
- METROWear Icon Francis Libiran: The TV Special (January 25, 2014)
- METRO Society 10: The Charity & Thanksgiving Event TV Special

== Local short segments ==
Short segments shown in-between shows or during advertising breaks.

- Scene and Heard – on events in town.
- Up and Coming – a segment on upcoming events.
- Objekt d' Art – a special segment on arts and culture.
- Fork on the Road – a segment on culinary.
- Life & Leisure – a guide on must-have establishments for all occasions.
- Savvy Shopper – a segment for consumers.
- Signature Dish – a culinary segment on restaurants as featured with professional chefs in the country.
- A Mile a Minute – a segment about travel and leisure.
- METRO Cover to Cover – a segment on the upcoming issue of METRO Magazine as featured with personalities behind the camera.
- Passion Journal – a segment on monthly and weekly journal highlights for occasions.
- Short Listed – a quick segment based on the program line-up.
