= Marc Morrone =

American animal dealer and breeder

- Born: 1960 (age 65–66); Bronx, New York, United States

Marc Morrone (born 1960 in Bronx, New York) is an American animal dealer and breeder and host of The Pet Shop with Marc Morrone for Mag Rack.

He also hosted Petkeeping with Marc Morrone, a television program produced by Martha Stewart Living Omnimedia, which originally ended its run on September 17, 2006, although several stations throughout the country continue to air old episodes to meet their E/I requirements. It was in production again on the Hallmark Channel in 2011-2012. He currently lives with his wife and many pets.

== Early life and career ==
At age four, Morrone adopted his first pet, a parakeet named Jinxie. By age 18, Morrone's pet collection had outgrown his parents' house. In 1978, Morrone opened a pet store Parrots of the World. with his business partner Nick Guerra in Rockville Centre, New York. The store has since grown into a large business and as of November 2021 it is still in operation.

Morrone's television career began as a guest on the News 12 program The Family Pet. In 1995, he started a cable show, Extra Help Pet Show, later renamed Metro Pets. The local cable show led to Morrone's guest appearances with Martha Stewart on her television program Martha Stewart Living, starting in 1997. In 2001, Hearst Entertainment began syndication of The Pet Shop With Marc Morrone.

== Petkeeping with Marc Morrone ==
In 2003, Martha Stewart Living Omnimedia gave him a half-hour show, Petkeeping with Marc Morrone. The program is taped on location in his pet store. Morrone was also a frequent contributor to Kids magazine, also published by Martha Stewart Living Omnimedia, and currently hosts a weekly radio program Petkeeping for Martha Stewart Living Radio, on Sirius Satellite Radio.

=== Pets which have appeared on Petkeeping ===
- Aouda, a kookaburra
- Adam and Eve, corn snakes
- Bananas, an albino Burmese python
- Bubbles and Squeak, prairie dogs
- Chaunticleer, a rooster
- Chicken little, a chicken
- Dante, a raven
- Darwin, a grey parrot
- Einstein, a screech owl
- Goofy, a Tanimbar corella
- Go Go, a black-headed parrot
- Harry, a scarlet macaw
- Harvey, a Flemish Giant rabbit
- Mel and Seymour Goldstein, guinea pigs
- Mercedes, a cat
- Murphy, a mixed breed dog
- Nelson, a red-eared slider turtle
- Prunella, an agouti
- Remus, a hyacinth macaw
- Splash, a ferret
- Sebastian, a Victoria crowned pigeon
- Shelby, a duck
- Tyler, a red headed finch
- Tigo, a cockatiel
- The Three Musketeers, four chinchillas, which appear on television three at a time.
- Walter, a pigeon
- Dixie, a Dachshund
- Piper, a Pug
- Tylo, a Pug
- Pamella, a red-eared slider turtle

=== List of episodes ===
| Episode name | Original air date |
|---|---|
| Kids & Kitties | September 20, 2004 |
| Dogs on the fly | October 4, 2004 |
| Bringing Up Birdie | October 18, 2004 |
| Paws with a Cause | October 25, 2004 |
| 'Phibious Fun | November 15, 2004 |
| All-American Dog | November 22, 2004 |
| Bringing Home Puppy | January 31, 2005 |
| Avian Attraction | April 25, 2005 |
| Better to See You | May 2, 2005 |
| Pigeon Love song | May 9, 2005 |
| Piggies & 'Toos | January 3, 2011 |
| Common Cat Problems and Solutions | January 5, 2011 |
| Reptiles | January 10, 2011 |
| Birds & Games | January 11, 2011 |
| Feathered&'Phibious | January 12, 2011 |
| Keets&Ferrets | January 18, 2011 |
| Bearded Dragons | January 19, 2011 |
| Older Pets | January 19, 2011 |
| Breed Groups | January 20, 2011 |
| The Best Toys for Your Pet | January 20, 2011 |
| Iguanas & More | January 24, 2011 |
| Wild Things | January 24, 2011 |
| Grays & Easter | January 25, 2011 |
| Is My Pet Crazy | January 25, 2011 |
| Best of MM1-2 | January 26, 2011 |
| Fish | January 26, 2011 |
| Pets at Weddings | January 27, 2011 |
| Choosing Fish | January 28, 2011 |
| Mini Marc | January 31, 2011 |
| Urban Pet Keeping | February 1, 2011 |
| Common Dog Problems & Solutions | February 14, 2011 |
| Furried & Friendly | February 25, 2011 |
| Collies N Cockatiels | March 4, 2011 |
| Juniors and Pets | March 7, 2011 |
| On the Kitty Runway | March 9, 2011 |
| New to You | March 10, 2011 |
| Ring Around the Neck | March 11, 2011 |
| Manx to Skinks | March 14, 2011 |
| Cavalier and Healthy | August 8, 2011 |
| Helpin Bunnies | August 10, 2011 |
| Service Snow Pups | August 11, 2011 |
| Pionus Outdoors | August 12, 2011 |
| Turtles | January 4, 2012 |
| Communication & Compassion | January 5, 2012 |
| Small Spaces | January 13, 2012 |
| Companions for Life | January 16, 2012 |
| Secrets to a Successful Vet Visit | January 17, 2012 |
| Roots | January 18, 2012 |
| Saltwater Creatures | January 25, 2012 |
| Aqua Friends | January 26, 2012 |
| Rodents | February 1, 2012 |
| Oral Care | February 3, 2012 |

== The Pet Shop with Marc Morrone ==
In March 2006 Morrone was featured on Mag Rack, in the Video On Demand series The Pet Shop with Marc Morrone. The program follows a similar format as Petkeeping, and aims to offer helpful and useful advice on caring for a variety of animals. It also includes appearance by his pets including Harry, a scarlet macaw; Splash, a ferret; and Harvey, a 13-pound Flemish rabbit. 25 episodes were developed for the first season, and cover various topics such as alternatives to dogs as pets, housetraining pets, caring for smaller animals, and tips on setting up and maintaining aquariums.

== Thieves rob Parrots of the World ==
On August 15, 2007, robbers broke into Morrone's Parrots of the World store through a back window and stole 45 parrots, including cockatoos, grey parrots and a toucan. The lot was valued at over $60,000. Morrone expressed concern for the pilfered parrots because they require special food and care and could die if they become overstressed. None of the stolen birds were Morrone's pets that have appeared on television with him, although many of them also live in the store.

== Books ==
Morrone has authored five books, Ask The Dog Keeper, Ask The Cat Keeper, Ask The Fish Keeper and Ask the Bird Keeper, all published by Bowtie Press in 2009. A Man For All Species, a book about the adventures of an animal keeper, was published by Random House in 2010.
