= Tyler's Ultimate =

American television series

Tyler's Ultimate is a television show on Food Network that was hosted by Tyler Florence. The show focused on making "ultimate" versions of popular or common dishes.

The show began as a secondary show for host Tyler Florence who was still making episodes of his original show, Food 911. At the time of its conception, Food Network became very active in creating traveling food shows. Tyler's Ultimate was unique in the regard that the host himself usually cooked on the program in addition to traveling. The original format of the show featured Tyler focusing on a particular dish for each episode. He would travel around the world to discover different versions of that dish, as well as its origins, in an attempt to discover the ultimate version of that dish. At the end of the episode, Florence would combine the recipes he learned through his travels and adding his own spin to create "the ultimate recipe," though some episodes simply had him eating the dish, not preparing it at all.

The show's format changed; the traveling was removed as well as where the inspiration of the ultimate recipe came from, and Florence simply presented his version for the entire program, typically with more side dishes.
