= The Great Food Truck Race season 11 =

The Great Food Truck Race
- Season 11
- The season's title card
- Hosted by: Tyler Florence
- No. of teams: 5
- Winner: Big Stuff
- Runner-up: Lia's LUMPIA
- No. of episodes: 4

Release
- Original network: Food Network
- Original release: November 27 – December 18, 2019

Additional information
- Filming dates: February 18 – March 10, 2019

The eleventh season of the American reality television series The Great Food Truck Race entitled The Great Food Truck Race: Holiday Hustle hosted by Tyler Florence began airing on the Food Network on November 27, 2019. It concluded on December 18, 2019, after airing a four episode season, making it the shortest season in the series history. It was announced on October 16, 2019, to be a special holiday-based season of the series. Five truck teams competed against each other in food-based competitions to be the last remaining team, with one team being eliminated each week.

== Format ==
On the first day, five new truck teams meet with host Tyler Florence. Each team receives a brand new food truck and seed money to buy necessities to operate their truck. Over the course of a weekend, they must attempt to sell as much food as possible to make profit. Along with selling food, the teams must also participate in a variety of challenges which can either help or harm them by having positive or negative responses based on the challenge results. Oftentimes teams either receive immunity from elimination, money toward their total, or extra selling time. The team with the least amount of money at the end of each weekend is eliminated from the competition and is required to return the keys to their truck before leaving. The last team remaining is allowed to keep their food truck and receives $50,000.

== Truck teams ==
Team name	Team members	Hometown	Cuisine	Place
Big Stuff	Brad Brutlag, Eddie Cumming, Mike O'Neill	Parker, Colorado	Stuffed food	1
Creole Queens	Tryshell Robertson, Raven Robertson, Ariana Mitchell	New Orleans, Louisiana	Louisiana Creole	3
Lia's LUMPIA	Spencer Hunter, Tania Garcia, Benelia Santos-Hunter	San Diego, California	Filipino, especially lumpia	2
Magical Mystery Heroes	Matt Williams, Hannah Schulz, Chris Williams	Fairfield, Ohio	Comfort food	4
Slapshot	Annika Johnson, Michaela Johnson, Sheila Johnson	Bemidji, Minnesota	Gourmet concession food	5

== Episodes ==
No. overall	No. in season	Title	Original release date	Viewers (millions)	18-49 rating
66	1	"Blizzard Brawl"	November 27, 2019	0.749	0.21
All five teams arrive via one-horse open sleigh on the outskirts of the woods to meet with Tyler Florence, who immediately hands them their first challenge.: Teams have 20 minutes to create a Christmas cocktail party appetizer with a hard-to-use "naughty" ingredient (fruitcake), and an easy-to-use "nice" ingredient (cranberries). The team with the appetizer Tyler likes best would win $200 in their till. The winner was Lia's LUMPIA; The teams later received $300 of seed money before driving to Wolfeboro, New Hampshire. After shopping, with a few stumbles, everyone heads downtown, except Lia's LUMPIA, who stayed by the grocery store. When the teams have settled down, Tyler calls in to relay their second challenge, which comes with a big reward.: Tyler has Santa Claus deliver a 20 lbs. turkey to the teams, which they'd use to create an original and creative holiday dish. The team that makes the most money off the dish over the weekend won immunity at elimination. The winner was Creole Queens.; Slap Shot decides to put the challenge off until their first tickets are done, but it later comes back to bite them as they sell out with not enough time to shop. They would utilize the turkey the following day. Magical Mystery Heroes attempted to park at the store, but because Lia's LUMPIA asked first, they were forced to move. Meanwhile, Big Stuff decides to stick with one menu item, which was sweet, but most customers began asking for savory foods. At elimination, Lia's LUMPIA was named as the top seller, while Slap Shot was eliminated.
67	2	"Candy Cane Clash"	December 4, 2019	0.685	0.21
The remaining four trucks roll into Portsmouth, New Hampshire, where they meet up with Tyler and local chef David Vargas, who got his start in the restaurant business with a food truck. He also helped Tyler give the teams their first challenge of the weekend.: The teams would pair up and have one hour to create a meal for 70 VIPs (5th graders from Shapleigh Middle School). The meal had to include an entrée, a side, and a dessert. Since Lia's LUMPIA won the previous week, they can choose their partner. They chose Creole Queens, making up the "Red Team", meaning Big Stuff and Magical Mystery Heroes would be the "Green Team". After the taste test, each table of students would cast a unanimous vote for their favorite lunch. The winning team received $200 towards each other's tills. The winner was the Red Team.; After the challenge, Tyler loaned the teams their seed money while giving them the details of their second challenge: The teams had to create a new menu item using candy canes, which David would come by to judge. The team whose dish he likes the best would win $300 towards their till. The winner was Lia's LUMPIA.; With only one day to sell, the teams needed to sell as much as possible to avoid elimination. Big Stuff experienced a water hose malfunction after shopping, which cost them two hours to repair, while the other three began to sell. Magical Mystery Heroes went all out as Chris dressed up as Santa to attract customers. The teams also heavily marketed their challenge dish on their menu, except for Lia's LUMPIA, who were focused on making a quality dish for David. By the end of the day, Big Stuff and Magical Mystery Heroes were running out of food, but with ingenuity and resourcefulness, they each salvaged all the food on the truck into a new dish. At elimination, Lia's LUMPIA won their second week in a row, while Magical Mystery Heroes was eliminated.
68	3	"We Three Trucks"	December 11, 2019	0.735	0.23
The final three stop by Killington, Vermont, where Tyler has reserved them spots at the Snowshed Lodge at the base of the Killington Ski Resort. As another surprise, he'll also supply them with their protein (chicken, beef, and Red Snapper), which they'll have to win in a challenge.: The teams competed in a snow-tubing relay race to decorate a Christmas tree with ornaments. Two teammates filled the rider's arms with ornaments before sending them down a hill to their designated tree, with one of their teammates running down to catch them. Those two then decorate their tree with any available ornaments; ornaments dropped on the hill could not be used. Once all the ornaments were used, the rider would walk back up the hill, tag in another teammate, and repeat the process two more times. The team with the fullest tree would get the first pick of protein. The winner was Big Stuff, and they chose chicken. Creole Queens had the second most ornaments on their tree, and they selected beef. Lia's LUMPIA, by default, were left with Red Snapper.; The teams began drawing their menus around their protein while accounting for local tastes, such as vegetarians and skiers. To up the competition, Big Stuff decided to open up and make everything to order. Lia's LUMPIA opens 30 minutes later, with Creole Queens opening last, nearly missing the lunch rush. Mike starts hawking at the customers, inspiring Ariana, Raven, and Benelia to do the same. Tyler later calls the teams to close up and move to Rutland, Vermont, while also giving them their next challenge.: The teams had to create a dish that represented their take on figgy pudding and sell it for $5. The team that sells the most dishes would win $500 in their till. The winner was Big Stuff; While shopping, the teams find that prices are higher in Rutland, as nothing was under $3, forcing them to spend more than expected. Like yesterday, Big Stuff is the first to open up, but this time, Creole Queens opens before Lia's LUMPIA. As for the challenge, specials are flying so fast that both Lia's LUMPIA and Creole Queens sold out with a lot of time left to spare. At elimination, Big Stuff was revealed as the top seller, while Creole Queens was eliminated
69	4	"New Champ in Newport"	December 18, 2019	0.652	0.17
The final two ride towards the oldest city the race has ever visited: Newport, Rhode Island. Pulling up to Beavertail Lighthouse on the Narragansett Bay, Tyler reveals that he has booked both trucks to sell side by side at the Newport Vineyards farmers market, while also handing them their first challenge.: The teams had to add a holiday-inspired dish featuring sweet potatoes, and whoever makes the most money off that dish gets $300 in their till. The winner was Big Stuff.; Arriving at the market to an enormous crowd, the teams also figured to adapt to local tastes and demographics; Lia's LUMPIA makes their challenge dish comparatively healthier, and Big Stuff sells their version of coffee milk. Soon, Tyler gives them a call from Provencal Bakery, whose bread gave him the idea for another challenge.: The teams received ten loaves of fresh country white bread from Provencal Bakery, and they had to make an original stuffing dish with them. Whoever sells the most specials would win another $300. The winner was Lia's LUMPIA.; Now juggling two challenge specials, the teams start scrambling to be the first ones open. Mike decides to hand customers in the winery order tickets, which they'd write their order on before giving them to Big Stuff. Tania does the same, but instead of standing behind their designated table, she walks down the line. However, their efficiency begins to dwindle as Lia's LUMPIA's orders take longer to complete. Tania then starts poaching customers from Mike's line. On Day 2, Tyler gives the teams a call, ordering them to drive to Long Wharf docks, where they meet Julio and Jennifer Lazzarini, co-owners of the Red Fin Crudo restaurant, and the judges for their last challenge of the race.: The teams were given a crate of lobsters, with which they were to make a holiday-inspired dish. Julio and Jennifer would taste their dishes, and the one they liked most would get $300. The winner was Big Stuff.; Soon, the rain starts pouring, so the two trucks call up private properties to ensure their presence in the city. The weather, as it does, makes selling difficult, forcing the two teams to move around. After finally finding stable locations, the last 30 minutes of sales are fierce, as orders start flying and Mike gets drenched in rain. Later, Tyler orders both to close and make their way to the Marble House, where they're greeted by champagne, a Christmas choir, and two presents, one of which contains $50,000. Ultimately, Big Stuff would win the season, and Lia's LUMPIA places second.

== Elimination history and results ==
Food Truck Elimination Table
Truck	Week 1 Wolfeboro, NH	Week 2 Portsmouth, NH	Week 3 Killington, VT & Rutland, VT	Week 4 Newport, RI
Big Stuff	4th ($1,437)	2nd ($2,028)	1st ($4,528)	WINNERS
Lia's LUMPIA	1st ($2,568)	1st ($2.763)	2nd^{2}	RUNNERS-UP
Creole Queens	2nd ($2,335)	3rd ($1,837)	3rd^{2}	
Magical Mystery Heroes	3rd ($1,654)	4th ($1,700)		
Slap Shot	5th ($1,367)^{1}			

Team that won The Great Food Truck Race.
Team who came in first that week.
Team that won money towards their till that week.
Team that won a non-monetary challenge for that week.
Team eliminated for that week.

=== Notes ===
- ^Note 1: Slap Shot held off the Turkey Challenge until Day 2, while the other four teams used the turkey on Day 1.
- ^Note 2: Dollar amounts were not announced, but the difference between the bottom two was $183.

== Production ==
Food Network announced the season as part of their holiday programming on October 16, 2019.

=== Filming ===
Filming for the first episode began on February 18, and ended on February 21, 2019, in Wolfeboro, New Hampshire. The second episode began filming in Portsmouth, New Hampshire, on February 24, 2019, at Shapleigh Middle School, and continued on February 25 in Market Square. Episode three filmed at the Killington Ski Resort Snowshed Base Area in Killington, Vermont, on March 2, 2019, before moving to Rutland, Vermont on March 3. The final episode began filming on March 9, 2019, with a special kick-off event at Newport Vineyards in Newport, Rhode Island, the season then concluded filming on March 10.
