= Whole Living =

- Cover of Whole Living
- Editor-in-chief: Alexandra Postman
- Categories: health and lifestyle
- Frequency: Ten editions annually
- Total circulation: 760,606 (June 2012)
- First issue: As Whole Living since May 2010; As Body+Soul since 2002; As New Age Journal in 1974
- Final issue: January 2013
- Company: Martha Stewart Living Omnimedia
- Country: United States
- Based in: New York City
- Language: English
- Website: wholeliving.com
- ISSN: 1098-447X

Cover from the October 2009 edition of Body + Soul, with Martha Stewart and her daughter, Alexis Stewart.

Whole Living was a health and lifestyle magazine geared towards "natural health, personal growth, and well-being," a concept the publishers refer to as "whole living." The magazine became a part of Martha Stewart Living Omnimedia in August 2004.

The magazine was originally launched as the New Age Journal in 1974. The magazine was first rebranded as Body+Soul beginning with an edition in early 2002. In 2004, Martha Stewart Living Omnimedia acquired the magazine and other publishing assets from Thorne Communications. The magazine became Whole Living in May 2010.

Martha Stewart Living Omnimedia announced its intention to cease publication of Whole Living. The final installment was the January/February 2013 issue. A $2.5 million offer to buy the title from private equity firm OpenGate Capital fell through and no other buyers appeared. The content from Whole Living was included in Martha Stewart Living.

== New Age Journal ==
New Age Journal, or New Age: The Journal for Holistic Living was an American periodical prominent in the late 20th century, and defining itself as covering topics related to the period's "New Age"; it has been succeeded, in turn, by Body & Soul. It described itself around the late 1990s as concerned with "achievement, commitment, health, creative living, and holistic nutrition".

It was founded in 1974 by Peggy Taylor and other editors of East/West Journal, and based in the Boston metropolitan area.

=== Makeovers ===
Under new editorship, it was "relaunched" in 2002 as the bi-monthly Body and Soul or Body & Soul. In 2004, it was bought by Martha Stewart's Omnimedia, which as of 2009 publishes Body+Soul (presented on its cover as "whole living | body + soul") eight times per year. In 2010, the magazine was relaunched as Whole Living.

In 2000, Robert Scheer created the website New Age Journal, which states that "We are not affiliated with any magazines printed on paper."

=== Personnel ===
- David Thorne, head of owning companies from 1983 to 2004

Its editors included:

- Marc Barasch
- Jennifer L. Cook
- Jody Kolodzey
- Rex Weyler

== Indexing information ==
- New Age Journal had ISSN 0746-3618 and OCLC 9978138 for issues from 1983 to 1998; published at the outset by Rising Star Associates (Brighton, MA).
- New Age Journal had ISSN 1098-447X and OCLC 38498642 for issues from 1998 to 2002; published by New Age Pub. (Watertown, MA).
