= The Luupe =

Women and non-binary photographers

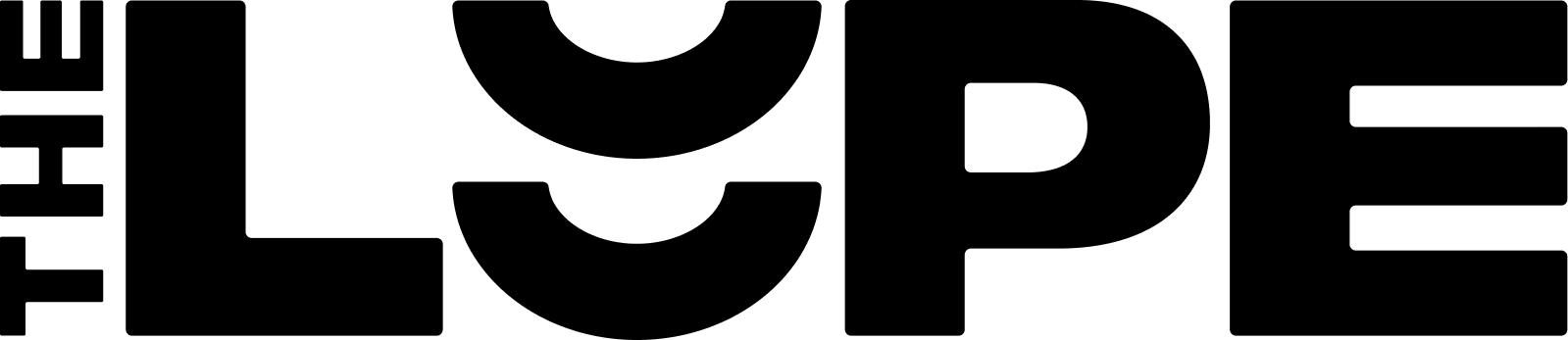
- Type: Private limited company
- Industry: Creative/technology
- Founded: 2019
- Founder: Keren Sachs
- Products: Creative services
- Number of employees: 13
- Website: theluupe.com

The Luupe is a global online platform and community of women and non-binary photographers who collaborate to provide diverse content for brands. The Luupe was founded in 2019 by Keren Sachs and is headquartered in New York City.

== History ==
Before creating The Luupe, Keren Sachs was the Director of Content Development at Shutterstock, where she helped create Offset, Shutterstock's premier content library. Sachs has spent most of her career working with photographers and businesses to shape their visions and has held content roles at National Geographic Society and Martha Stewart Living Omnimedia. Responding to what she saw as an absence in brands hiring women photographers, Sachs created The Luupe, with the mission to get more women behind the lens and generate income for themselves. As brands increase the amount of content they release on various channels and prioritize capturing diverse perspectives, the need for diverse photographers increases as well.

The Luupe has been operating since the beginning of 2019 and their work has been featured in The New York Times and Fast Company.

In September 2022, The Luupe founder Keren Sachs was included in .INC's Female Founders 100 list "for helping diverse photographers and content creators secure mutually beneficial relationships with top brands."

== Current Operations ==
The Luupe provides photographers with opportunities to network with each other, share technical tips, negotiation strategies, portfolio reviews, job opportunities, and uses their blog to create stories on women and visual culture.

The Luupe team brings new photographers into their community through an open submission process, selecting photographers based on experience, vision, and geographical location. For photographers who are not accepted into The Luupe's community, the team often provides feedback on how to improve their work.

The photographers selected are given profiles with information about their past work. When brands and organizations contact The Luupe to collaborate on a project, The Luupe recommends a photographer or team of photographers in multiple locations and often manages the creative and production process.
