= Skyline Restaurant =

Diner in Portland, Oregon, U.S.

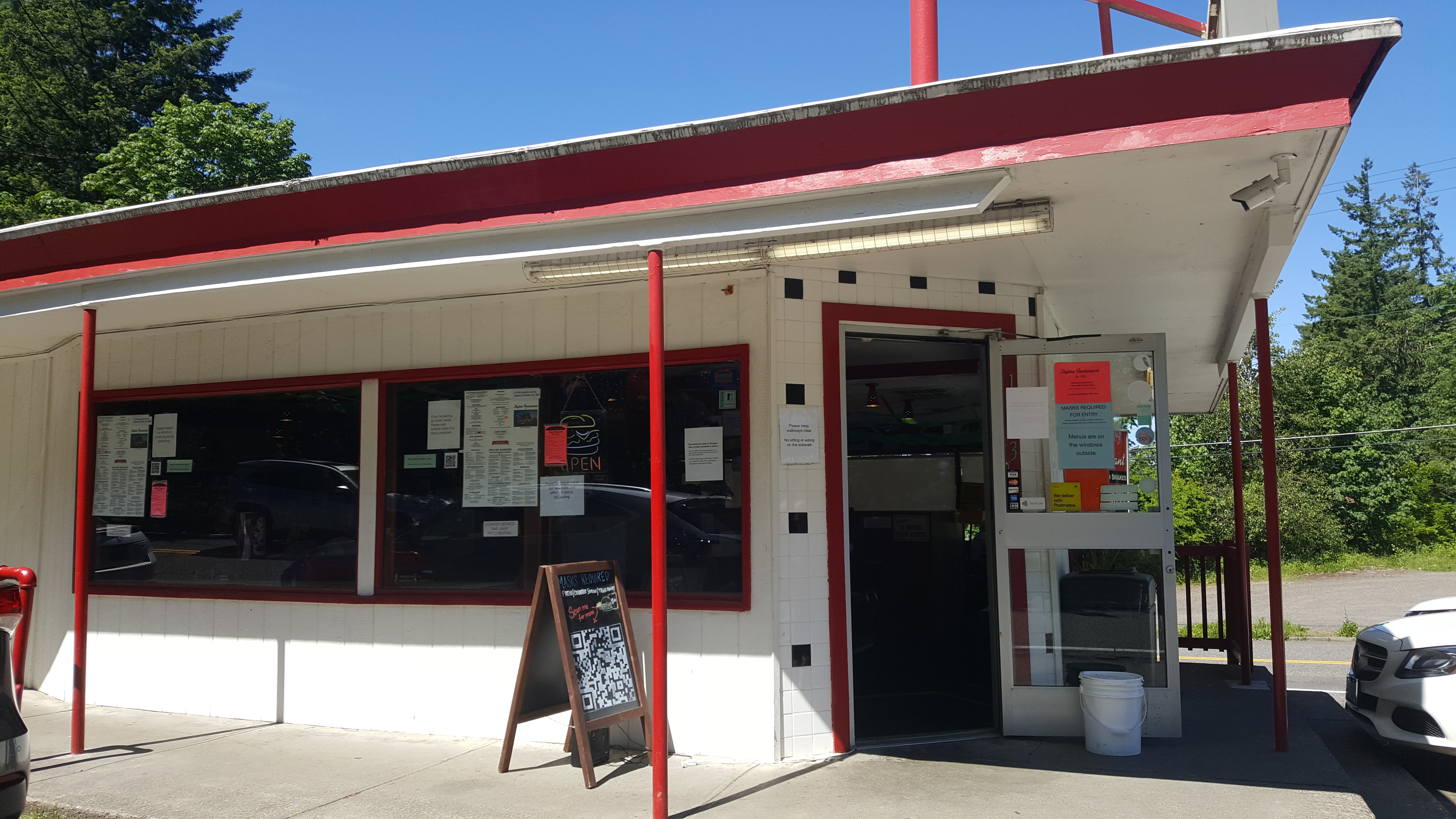
- The restaurant's exterior in 2021
- Interactive map of Skyline Restaurant

Restaurant information
- Established: 1935
- Owner: Michelle Nelson
- Previous owners: Benny and Phyllis Lum; Ken Hom
- Food type: American
- Location: 1313 Northwest Skyline Boulevard, Portland, Oregon, United States
- Coordinates: 45°31′54.2″N 122°45′17.8″W
- Website: skylineburgers.com

Skyline Restaurant (formerly The Speck and nicknamed "The Skyliner") is a diner in northwest Portland, Oregon, in the United States. Established in 1935, the restaurant initially sold fried chicken by a gas station. It gained popularity during the 1950s, and Skyline's menu of American cuisine has changed little since then. Michelle Nelson has owned the diner since 1999; previous owners have included Benny and Phyllis Lum, as well as Ken Hom, who eliminated drive-in service. Skyline's burgers and milkshakes have received a generally positive reception. In 1975, James Beard said the restaurant's burger was among the best in the country, and Food Network Magazine said Skyline had the best burger in Oregon in 2009.

A spin-off restaurant called Sky Two operated during the 1980s, and a second location called Skyline Burgers operated in northeast Portland from 2011 to 2014.

== Description ==
Skyline Restaurant is located on Skyline Boulevard at Cornell Road in northwest Portland. KOIN has described Skyline as an "iconic drive-in diner that has been serving Portlanders by the thousands every year for the past seven decades". The restaurant has also been described as an "old-school" and "child-friendly, old-fashioned, locally-owned" drive-in with a patio and picnic tables. The Los Angeles Times has described Skyline as a "true '50s diner" with a soda fountain. The Portland Mercury has described the clientele as a "cross-section of high school kids and families, travelers, and even leather-clad couples roadtripping on Harleys".

In 2001, Willamette Week's Jim Dixon said of the interior: "There's an espresso hut tacked onto the Cornell Road side to service the stream of commuters that pours by every morning and an ATM inside... The dining room, a warren of roomy booths and a few small tables, still wears the faded glory of an 40-year-old upgrade." He also wrote, "Wood paneling, acoustic tile ceiling, and those Jetson-y light fixtures from the days of Sputnik provide a fitting setting for food that might have been transported from the Kennedy era as well."

Skyline is open seven days a week, except for Thanksgiving and Christmas. The restaurant has a sign advertising the "Best Burger in Portland". Classic rock is played outside, and orders are announced over a speaker. According to Martin Cizmar of Willamette Week, the restaurant's soundtrack has "lots of Beach Boys and the pre-Tiffany version of 'I Think We're Alone Now'."

=== Menu ===
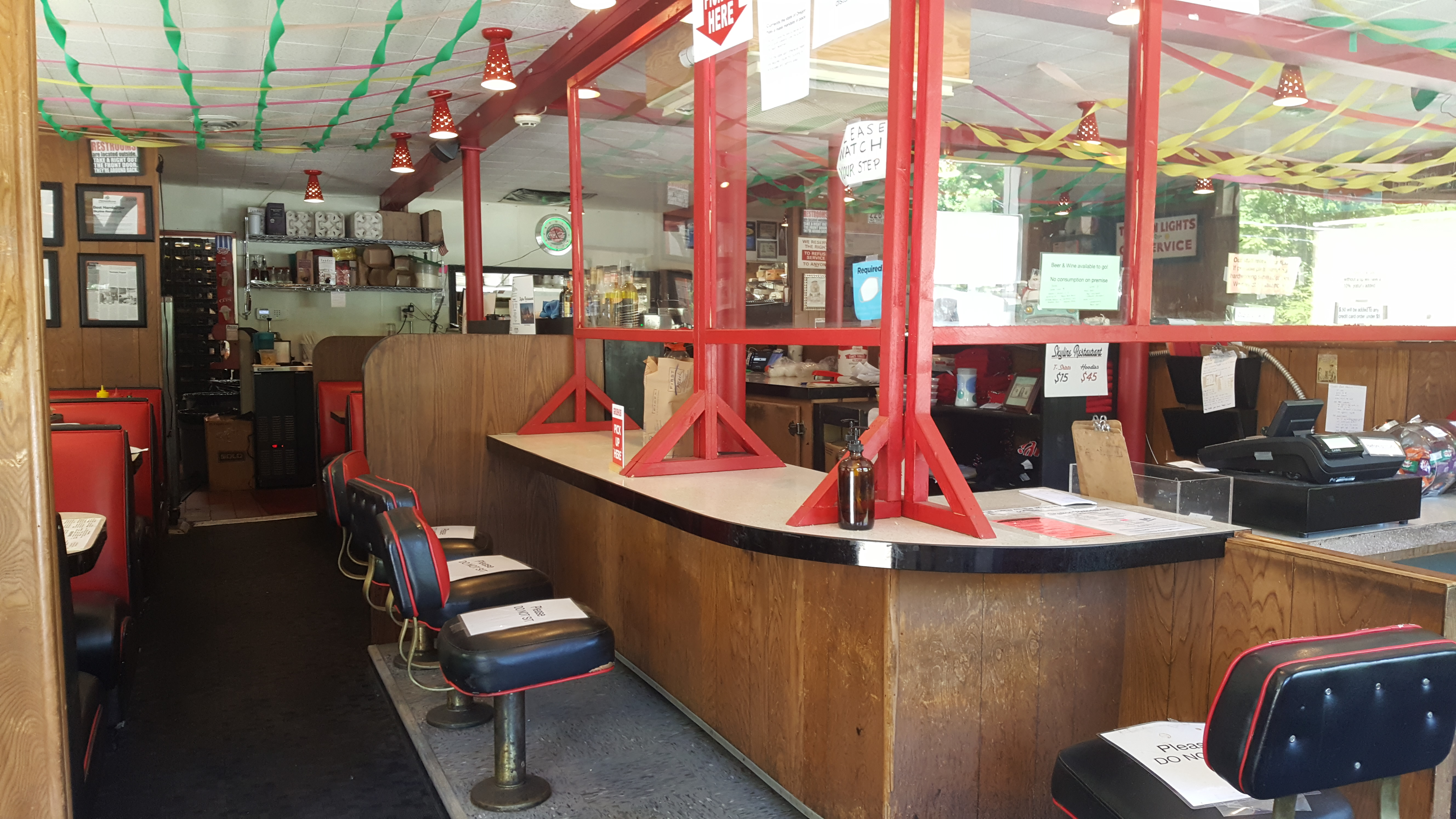
The diner's interior in 2021, during the COVID-19 pandemic

The restaurant serves American cuisine such as burgers, chili cheese burgers and tater tots, and French fries. The menu also included fish and chips with coleslaw, fried chicken, hot dogs, tuna melt sandwiches, chili, and a Cobb salad. Vegetarian options included a garden burger and a beyond burger. There are two dozen float, malt, and milkshake varieties, including banana, butterscotch, caramel apple, chocolate-covered cherry, hazelnut, marionberry, mocha, peanut butter, peppermint, and pineapple. Pie shake flavors have included banana cream and coconut cream. Skyline has also served a 30-ounce shake. The weekend breakfast menu has included omelettes and pancakes.

== History ==
Originally known as The Speck, Skyline Restaurant was established in 1935. It initially sold fried chicken next to a gas station, and gained popularity in the mid 1950s. Benny and Phyllis Lum owned the business for fifteen years, before selling it to their relative Ken Hom. Hom, who is of Chinese ancestry, considered adding Chinese cuisine to the menu, but did not "because of the restaurant's tradition". Hom did, however, eliminate drive-in service due to limited interest by customers.

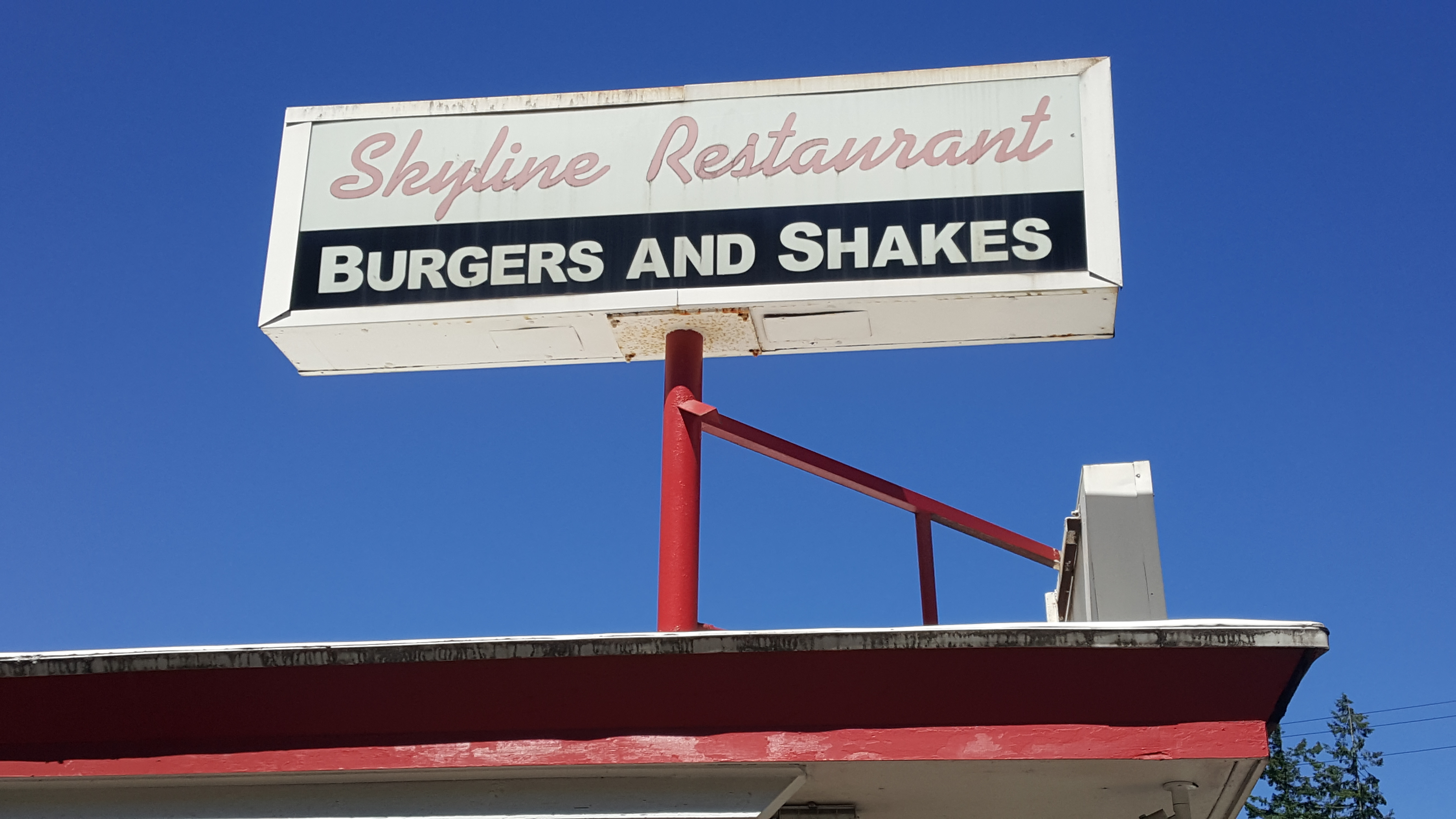
Restaurant sign, 2021

In 1986, The Oregonian's Elizabeth Amsden said Skyline "has changed little since it started serving a hamburger menu more than 25 years ago". She described booths with black cushions, white formica tables, copies of a column written by American chef James Beard on display, and 1950s popular music in the background. Hom had owned the business for a decade at the time. He told The Oregonian that 70 to 80 percent of customers were visitors from downtown Portland. Amsden noted, "At 800 feet elevation, the Skyliner closes for three weeks every winter to give employees vacations when severe weather often affects business. Sometimes it closes two or three times in winter months when snow or freezing rain becomes too severe for car travel on the roads winding up and down the hillside."

Michelle Nelson purchased the business in June 1999. In 2022, KOIN said Skyline "remains true to its original roots of classic American Diner fare". The business suffered multiple break-ins in 2022–2023. Skyline was also impacted by Portland General Electric's temporary public safety power shutoff in September 2022, the result of high risk fire conditions.

=== Sky Two and Skyline Burgers ===
In 1983, Hom established the spin-off restaurant Sky Two at the Yamhill Marketplace. The Oregonian said Sky Two was recently closed, as of August 1986.

Skyline opened a second location, called Skyline Burgers, on Broadway in northeast Portland in 2011. The Sullivan's Gulch space was previously occupied by Chez Jose. Danielle Centoni described the outpost as a "sports bar with a '50s fetish". The menu included steak burgers and cocktails, including a Mai Tai variant called the Hollywood Bowl. The interior had a red-checkered floor, retro decor, and depicting "'50s bobby-sockers' and ... the Portland skyline".

- Skyline Burger's Quadzilla Challenge - Portland, OR on YouTube, Thrillist

Skyline Burgers had a food challenge called the Quadzilla Challenge, which included: 32 ounces of beef across four patties between two buns with onion rings, bacon, and cheese; 16 ounces of French fries; and a large soda. Patrons who completed the challenge received reimbursement plus a photo on the wall. Andy Kryza included the Quadzilla in Thrillist's 2013 overview of the "craziest" food challenges in the U.S. The location was closed in 2014.

== Reception ==
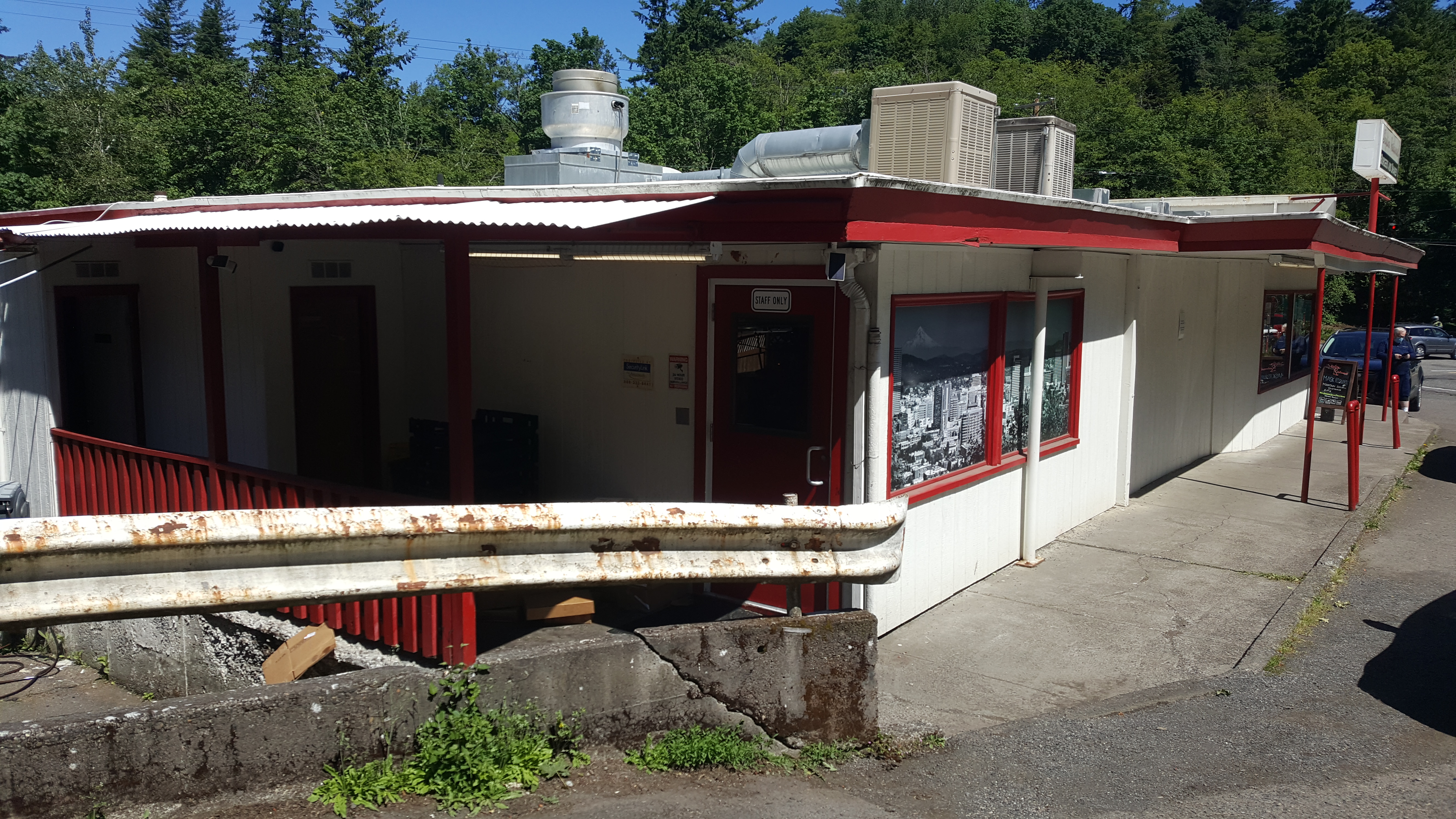
The restaurant's exterior, 2021

The restaurant's burgers and milkshakes have received a generally positive reception. After visiting Skyline in 1975, James Beard said, "People are constantly arguing about where you get the best hamburgers. Well, I've tasted a lot of them in my time and I honestly believe that the hamburger I had this summer at Skyline Drive-In Restaurant ... stands out as one of the best in the country." In 2009, Food Network Magazine said Skyline had the best burger in Oregon.

Josh Ozersky of Time magazine said Skyline's hamburger was "just so-so" and the surrounding scenery ... was awe-inspiring" in 2010. In her 2014 book Portland: A Food Biography, Heather Arndt Anderson said Skyline's burgers and shakes "are a testament to the utter pointlessness of reinventing the wheel". In 2016, Julie Lee of 1859 Oregon's Magazine said "not much has changed over time, including the customers. This is a diner joint loyalists love, with old fashioned red booths and great greasy food".

Drew Tyson included the steak burger in Thrillist's 2014 list of Portland's nine best "under-the-radar" burgers, in which he recommended the original location over the northeast Portland outpost. Rachel Pinsky included Skyline in Eater Portland's 2021 list of 12 "road-trip-worthy" drive-ins for "beefy burgers and swirls of ice cream" in the Portland metropolitan area. In 2022, writers for the website called the diner "the ideal spot for a weekend lunch" after hiking in Forest Park. Similarly, Nathan Williams included Skyline in his overview of "where to grab a bite after an Oregon hike", in which he called the diner a "longtime staple burger joint" ideal for visiting after a Coastal Range hike. The website's Maya MacEvoy also included the restaurant in a 2022 overview of Portland's best milkshakes.

=== Newspapers ===
In 2004, Phil Amara of the Portland Mercury wrote:

Tucked at the end of a winding, hilly Northwest Portland road, Skyline appears like a lighthouse on rough seas. Going more by the 'build it and they will come' philosophy and less by the realtor mantra of 'location, location, location,' the owners of the '50s-style diner must've gambled that quality, not convenience, would bring customers in the door. And they were right. Skyline has successfully operated for a few decades without hype, clown pitchmen, or toys with your child's food.

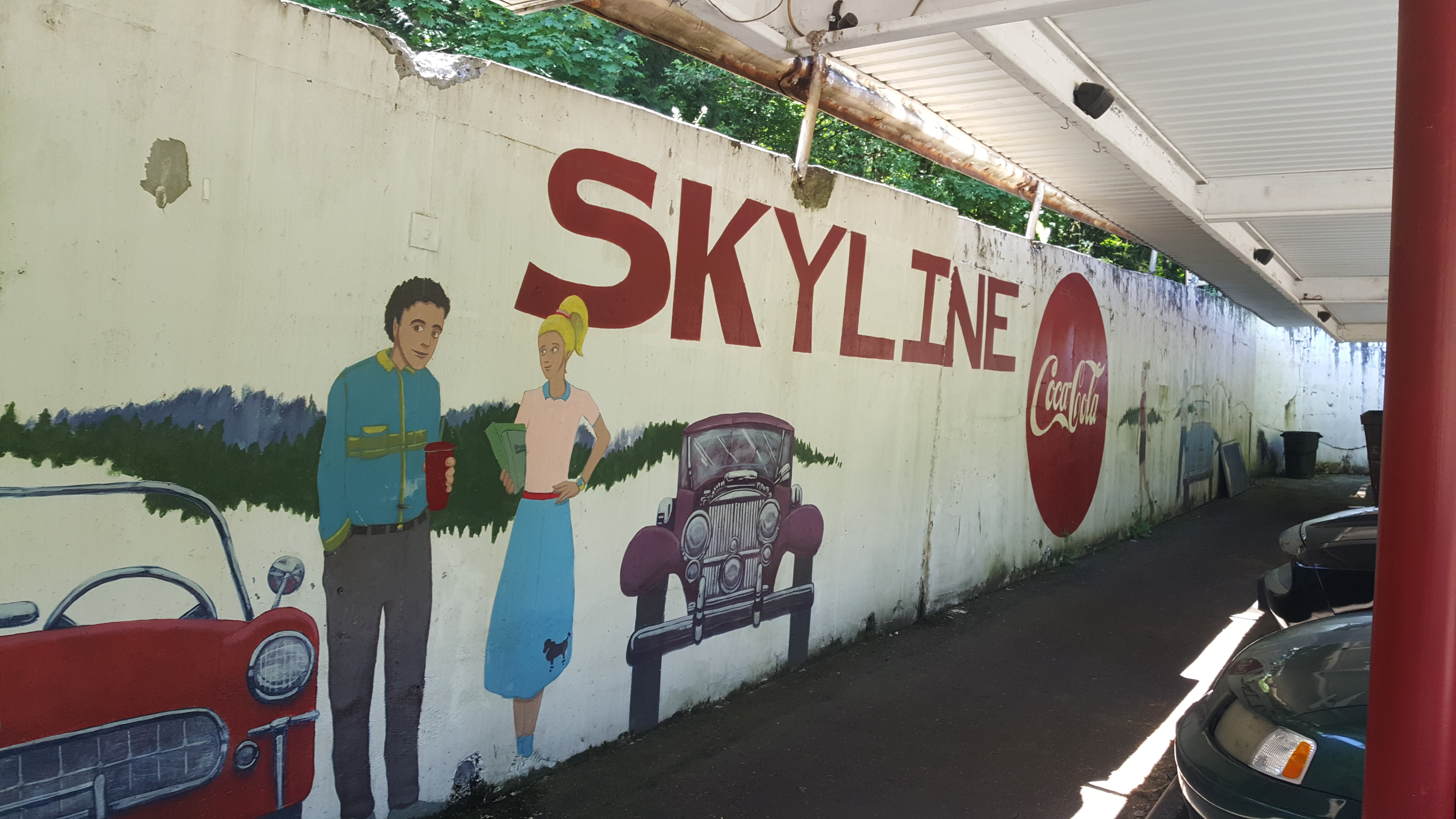
Mural along the parking lot, 2021

Amara opined, "While it may be a blueprint for neo-nostalgia places like Johnny Rockets and Ruby's, Skyline is not a kitschy museum of '50s pop culture. Its interior is humble. No records on the walls, no tacky homage to Elvis, The Beatles, or Buddy Holly. Just great diner food--the way it was intended." Following Food Network Magazine's recognition of Skyline's burger, Grant Butler of The Oregonian disagreed and wondered how research was completed. Michael Russell ranked Skyline number two in the newspaper's 2011 overview of the best "classic" burgers in the metropolitan area. After acknowledging Beard's appreciation for Skyline's burger, Willamette Week's Walker MacMurdo wrote in 2017: "Skyline's burger is no longer among the best in the country." In the newspaper's Burger Madness competition, Skyline lost to Little Big Burger. Writers for Willamete Week said the restaurant's sign advertising the city's best burger was "for good reason" in 2022.

== See also ==
- List of diners
