= El Paseo (restaurant) =

Defunct restaurant in Mill Valley, California, U.S.

- Interactive map of El Paseo

Restaurant information
- Location: 17 Throckmorton Avenue, Mill Valley, California, 94941, United States
- Coordinates: 37°54′23.5″N 122°32′47.3″W

El Paseo was a restaurant in Mill Valley, California. The restaurant had received a Michelin star, before closing.

== History ==
Originally a French restaurant that opened in 1947, El Paseo reopened in 2011 as a steakhouse by musician Sammy Hagar with celebrity chef Tyler Florence. After that partnership ended, Hagar transitioned the menu to a Spanish cuisine. In 2018, Hagar announced the restaurants closure citing time constraints and conflict with his music career as the reason for the closure.

In 2019, Hagar sold the restaurant to new owners who reopened the restaurant as Paseo: A California Bistro. Paseo: A California Bistro closed in December 2025.

== See also ==
- List of defunct restaurants of the United States
- List of Michelin-starred restaurants in California
