= Blueprint: Design Your Life =

Blueprint: Design Your Life was a bimonthly women's interest magazine published by Martha Stewart Living Omnimedia. MSLO announced that they intended to release 2 test issues in May and August 2006, with an initial base circulation of 250,000, and planned to begin regular bimonthly publication in 2007. The first issue was released May 1, 2006.

The magazine targeted women ages 25–40, and competed with magazines such as Real Simple (whose former editor Tom Prince headed the new magazine) and Domino for readers. It was recognized as a move by the company to become more competitive in the younger demographic, and diversify its interests outside the core Martha Stewart brand.

Martha Stewart Living Omnimedia closed Blueprint after its January/February 2008 issue, moving it to the web and to special issues of Martha Stewart Weddings.
