= List of programs broadcast by Metro Channel =

This is a list of programs currently and soon to be broadcast by Metro Channel. For the previous programs which are airing, see List of programs aired by Lifestyle/Metro Channel.

== Current shows on Metro Channel ==
=== Metro Channel Original Programming ===
- At The Table (Season 2) (formerly "Chasing Flavors"; 2017–present)
- Beached (2018–present)
- Casa Daza (Season 2) (2017–present)
- Driven (2018–present)
- In The Metro (2018–present)
- Metro Home (2018–present)
- Potluck (Season 2) (2021–present)
- Pia's Postcards (2018–present)

=== Programs broadcast on ABS-CBN (Kapamilya Channel) ===
==== Documentary ====
- G Diaries (2017–present)

==== Religious ====
- Kapamilya Daily Mass (2020–present)
- Kapamilya Sunday Mass (2020–present)
- Kapamilya Journeys of Hope (2020–present)

=== Programs broadcast on ANC ===
- Executive Class (2017–present)

=== Home & Living ===
- Best Houses Philippines
- Island Life
- Luxe Asia (Season 2)
- Luxury Homes Revealed
- SMDC The Good Home
- The Real Houses of...

=== Food & Travel ===
- Andy and Ben Eat Australia
- Booze Traveller
- Check-In
- Dreamcatchers
- Donal Skehan's Kitchen Hero
- Jamie Cooks Italy
- United Plates of America
- The Food Files
- The Wine Show
- Tim's Table

=== Fashion & Style ===
- VideoFashion News

=== Entertainment & Glamour ===
- Hollywood News Feed

==== Movie Block ====
- Movies in the Metro

==== Variety ====
- ASAP XP
- Arts.21

== Special Coverage ==
Starting 2015, the channel is the official broadcaster for the following US events (same day or within 48 hours of US telecast):

- Primetime Emmy Awards (2014–present)
- Hollywood Christmas Parade (first cable channel to do so in the country, 2015–present)
- Tournament of Roses Parade (formerly of Studio 23 (now S+A) and aired in Filipino in 2009 on ABS-CBN and in 2018 on Jeepney TV, 2016–2017, 2019–present)
- Screen Actors Guild Awards (2016–present)

== Metro Channel TV Specials ==
- ABS-CBN Ball (2019)
- Binibining Pilipinas (2014–2024)
- Star Magic Ball (2016–2018)
- Pantawid ng Pag-ibig: At Home Together Concert (March 22, 2020) (together with ABS-CBN, S+A, ANC, DZMM Radyo Patrol 630, DZMM TeleRadyo, Jeepney TV, Asianovela Channel, MOR Philippines, iWant, TFC, and Myx)
