= Food Network Magazine =

Monthly food-related magazine based on the Food Network introduced in 2008

- Cover of the October–November 2024 issue
- Editor: Maile Carpenter
- Categories: Food and drink magazine, Celebrity
- Frequency: Bi-monthly
- Total circulation (2024): 809,700
- Founded: 2008
- Company: Hearst Communications
- Country: United States
- Based in: New York City
- Language: English
- Website: www.foodnetwork.com/magazine/
- ISSN: 1944-723X

Food Network Magazine is a bi-monthly food entertainment magazine founded by Hearst Communications and Scripps Networks Interactive based on the latter's popular television network Food Network. The magazine debuted in 2008, originally as two newsstand-only test issues to be followed by the first official issue in June 2009. In 2010, it reached 5 million readers with each issue with a 1.35 million circulation. The magazine has its headquarters in New York City.

== History ==
In October 2008, Hearst President Cathie Black announced that Hearst Magazines had partnered with Scripps Networks Interactive to develop Food Network Magazine. Maile Carpenter, who was working at Everyday with Rachael Ray, is the magazine's founding editor. The magazine started out with a 300,000 issue rate base guarantee to advertisers. Due to the significant growth of interest and subscribers generated by internet sales and television, that guarantee increased to 1.25 million after 9 issues in 2009-2010.

== Editorial ==
Each issue features various Food Network talent throughout its pages, plus a behind-the-scenes look at their shows and kitchens. The magazine also showcases kitchen tools, food products, new restaurants, recipes and food across the United States.

Chefs that have been included in Food Network Magazine include Alton Brown, Guy Fieri, Bobby Flay, Ina Garten, Michael Symon, Melissa d'Arabian, Rachael Ray, Tyler Florence, Ellie Krieger, Ted Allen, Morimoto, Aida Mollenkamp, Anne Burrell, Aarón Sanchez, Jose Garces, Pat Neely, Sunny Anderson and Nigella Lawson.

== Accolades ==
Accolades earned by the magazine include being named "Launch of the Year" by Folio, Advertising Age and Min. In April 2010, Food Network Magazine was listed as #1 on Adweek's Hot List "10 under 60" for their first eligible year.

== See also ==
- Food Network
- List of food and drink magazines
