= Martha Stewart Baby =

Childcare magazine

Martha Stewart Baby was a childcare magazine published between 2000 and 2003. The magazine, of which first issue appeared in March 2000, specialized in projects and topics for parents related to the care of newborns to toddlers. It was published biannually by Martha Stewart Living Omnimedia.

The first issue of Martha Stewart Baby was dated Baby 2000. A total of seven issues were published. The last issue of the magazine published in Spring 2003.
