= Sur La Table =

Cookware retailer

- Type: Private
- Industry: Retail
- Founded: 1972; 54 years ago
- Headquarters: Seattle, Washington, US,
- Number of locations: 59
- Products: Cookware; Bakeware; Cutlery; Small electrics; Cooking tools; Housewares
- Owner: Marquee Brands; CSC Generation
- Website: surlatable.com

Sur La Table, Inc. (French: [syʁ la tabl]) is a privately held retail company based in Seattle, Washington, that sells kitchenware including cookware, cutlery, cooks' tools, small electrics, tabletop and linens, bakeware, glassware and bar, housewares, food, and outdoor products. As of October 2018, Sur La Table sold products in 184 stores in 32 states across the United States, as well as through their website and catalogs. Cooking classes are available in over 80 stores. Sur La Table has a blog, A Sharp Knife & Salt, that focuses on food, chefs, restaurants and products. Many of the company's stores offer culinary classes with plans to include a kitchen in every new store. The company's corporate headquarters is located in Seattle's Georgetown neighborhood.

In French, sur la table means on the table. French pronunciation: [syʁ la tabl]

== History ==
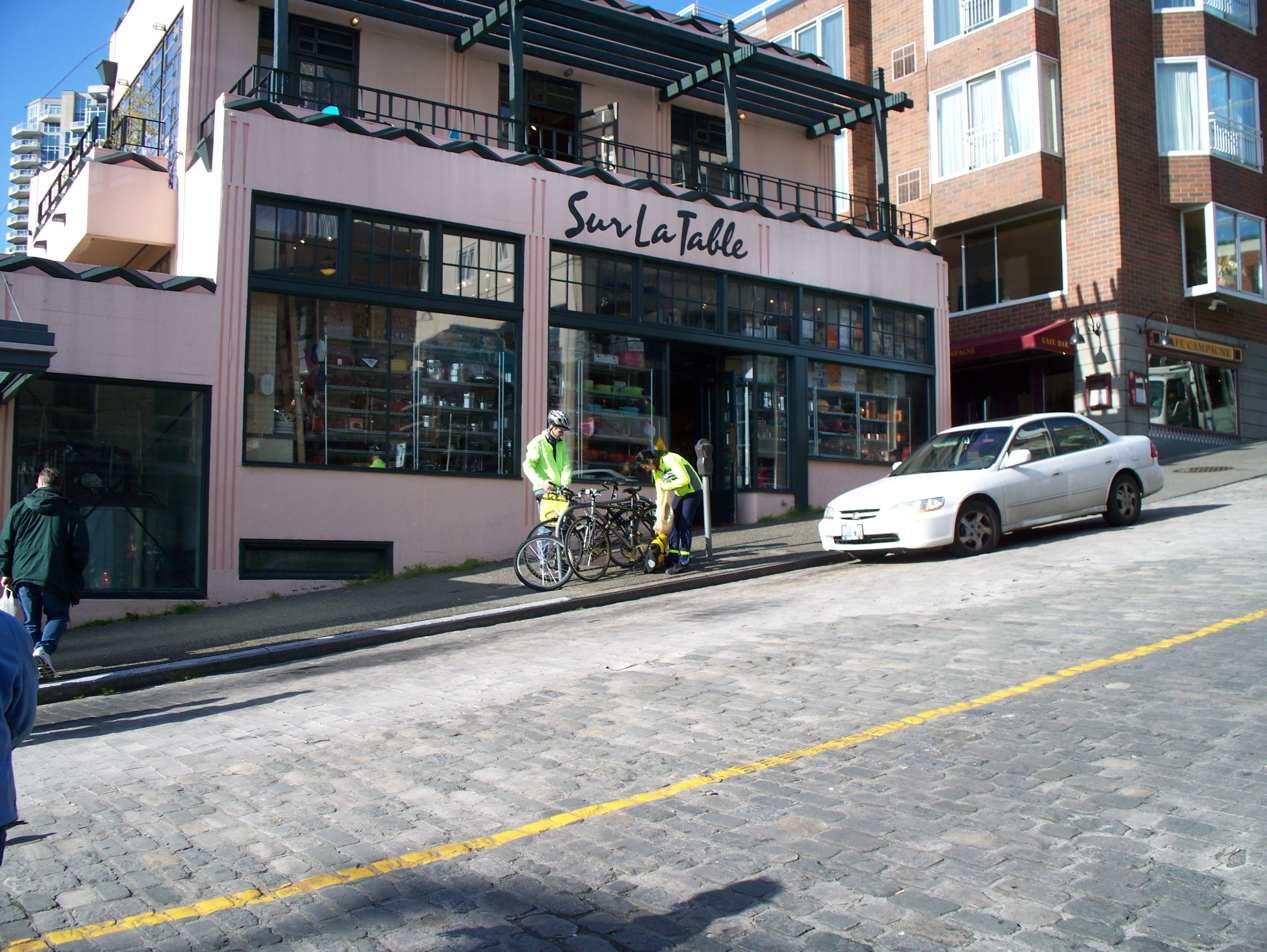
Sur La Table's Pike Place location in Seattle, Washington.

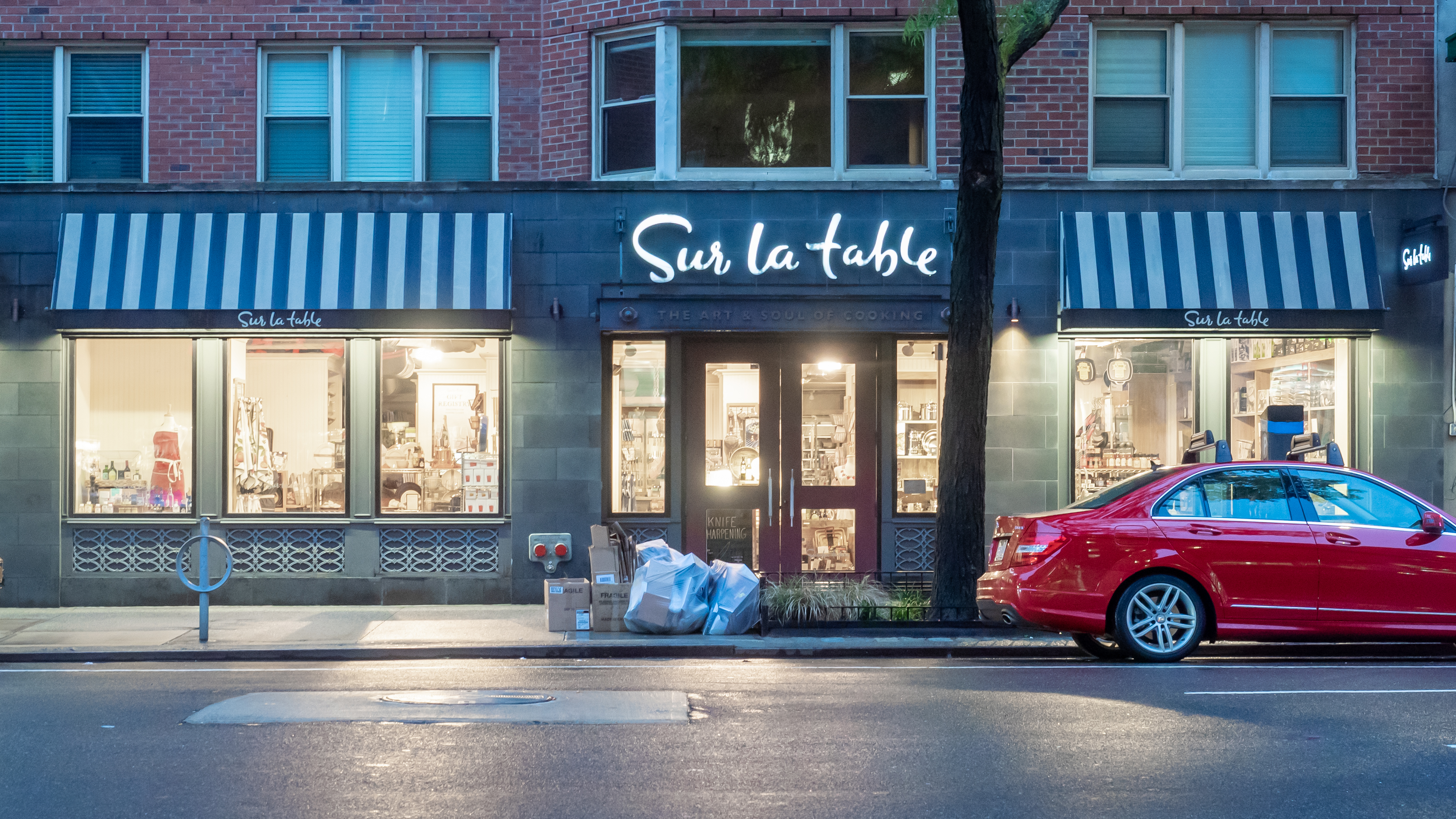
Store in New York City.

Shirley Collins founded Sur La Table in 1972, opening a single retail location in Seattle's Pike Place Market. In 1995, Collins sold the company.

In 2005, Kathy Tierney took over as the chief executive officer and advocated an expansion policy of opening new stores in "lifestyle centers", malls, and on city streets "with a mix of upscale national brands and creative local merchants, anchored by an upscale or organic-themed grocery store that encourages frequent trips." Sur la Table became the second-largest specialty cookware retailer in the United States behind Williams Sonoma.

In January 2011, Sur la Table launched a website and gift registry program.

In September 2011, Sur La Table was purchased by Bahrain-based Investcorp for an undisclosed amount. It had 86 stores.

On February 18, 2020, it was reported that Sur La Table and Discovery, Inc.'s Food Network Kitchen streaming service would team up together to produce a "first-of-its-kind cooking ecosystem" which will allow students to participate with the in-store cooking class via online streaming.

In March 2020, the company closed all 130 outlets due to the COVID-19 pandemic. In June 2020, the company announced that it would indefinitely lay off 27 workers, or about 18% of the staff, at its corporate headquarters in Georgetown. The separations began on July 1 and did not include severance packages.

In July 2020, Sur La Table filed for Chapter 11 bankruptcy and was acquired by Marquee Brands and CSC Generation for $88.9 million. By September 2020, it planned to close 73 stores.

In March 2025, Sur La Table acquired another Seattle-based company, Seattle Coffee Gear.
