= Kids (2000s magazine) =

American children's magazine

- Categories: children's magazine
- Founded: 2001
- Final issue: Spring 2006
- Company: Martha Stewart Living Omnimedia
- Country: United States
- Based in: New York
- Language: English
- Website: www.marthastewart.com/kids
- ISSN: 1546-4709

Kids: Fun Stuff To Do Together was a children's magazine published in the mid-2000s. Kids, which was originally launched in 2001 as Martha Stewart Kids, specialized in projects that children could make, either by themselves or along with their parents. It was published quarterly by Martha Stewart Living Omnimedia. Kids was also a winner of the prestigious 2005 and 2006 National Magazine Award for Design, and in 2005 for Photography by the American Society of Magazine Editors.

On March 1, 2006, the publishers of Kids announced that the company decided to discontinue the full-sized quarterly magazine with the Spring 2006 issue in favor for a new digest sized publication, Good Things for Kids, which will be published biannually and carries no advertising. Current readers were given the option to subscribe to Everyday Food for the remainder of their subscription.
