= Bruno Magli =

Italian luxury shoe and goods company

- Industry: Fashion
- Founded: 1930; 96 years ago
- Founder: Bruno Magli
- Headquarters: Bologna, Italy
- Products: Shoes, leather goods
- Website: www.brunomagli.com

Bruno Magli (Italian pronunciation: [ˈbruːno ˈmaʎʎi]) is an Italian luxury house that specialises in shoes and leather goods for men and women. Since 2015, the brand is owned by Marquee Brands, which is headquartered in New York City.

== History ==
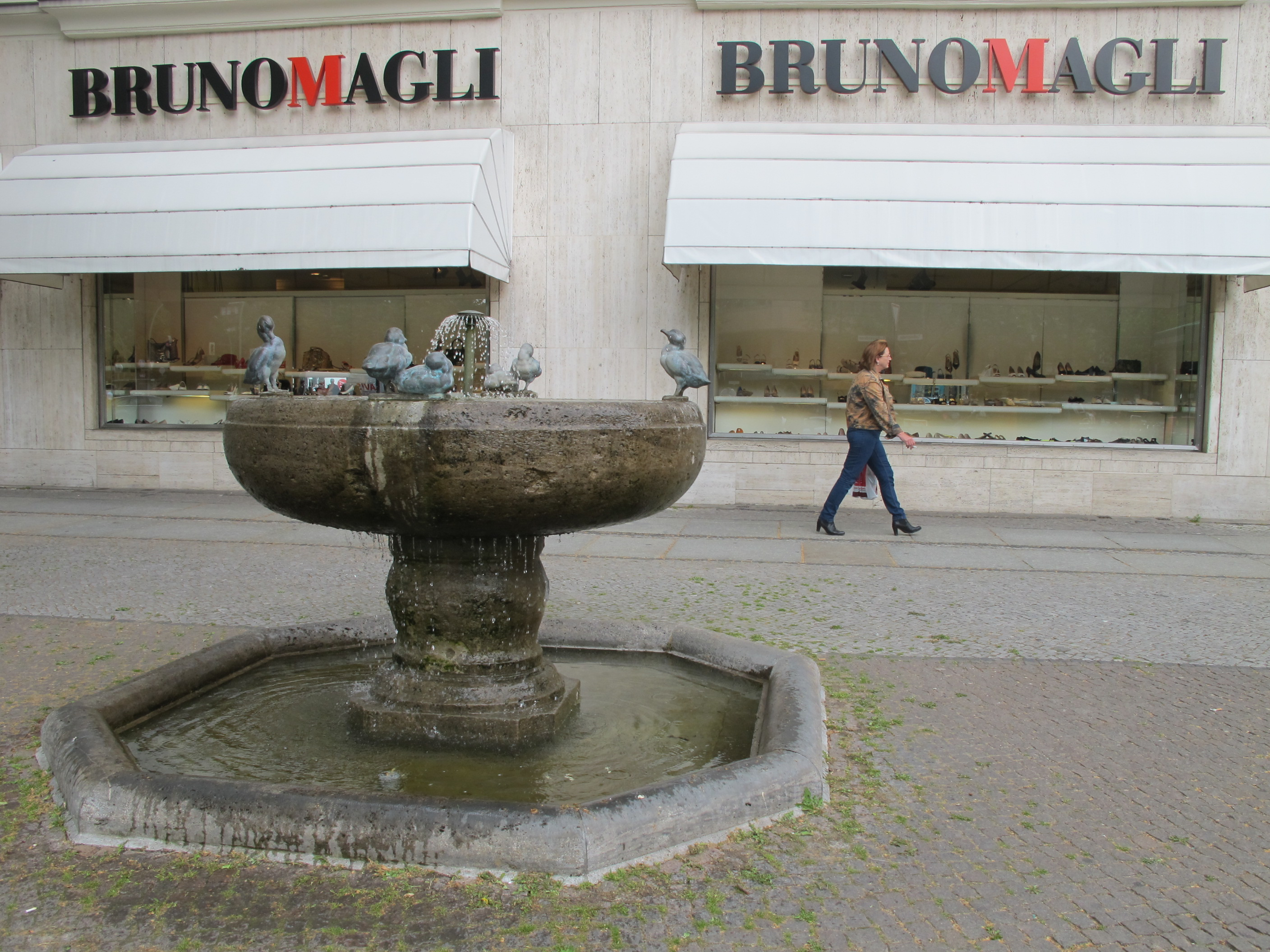
Cygnets fountain in Berlin in front of Bruno Magli shop at Kurfürstendamm, 2012

Founded in 1936, siblings Marino, Mario and Bruno started a small business in the basement of their home in Bologna, Italy, after learning the art of shoemaking from their grandfather. The trio began to accept contract work until the first Magli Shoe Factory (Calzaturificio Magli) was established later that same year.

In 1947, shortly after World War II, the company built their first manufacturing facility.

In 1969, the company moved to a more modern factory in Bologna.

From the 1980s onwards, the Magli company opened over forty retail stores located throughout the United States, Australia, China and Europe.

=== OJ Simpson trial ===
The shoes were a major component of the 1995 O.J. Simpson trial. Simpson wore size 12 suede waffle Lorenzo model with soles manufactured by Silga. Sales increased thirty per cent in 1996 and fifty percent in 1997. Subsequent owners, Marquee stated the association was not one they welcomed or wished for, but acknowledged the increased public interest.

== Acquisitions ==
In 2001, the Luxembourg-based investment fund Opera, half-owned by Bulgari, acquired a controlling interest in Bruno Magli. In 2007, Opera sold the brand to UK private equity fund Fortelus Capital, and in 2014, the Swiss fund Da Vinci Invest acquired the brand.

In January 2015, Marquee Brands announced its acquisition of the Bruno Magli brand and related intellectual property assets from Bruno Magli S.p.A. Marquee Brands, a brand acquisition, licensing and development company, was launched by the private equity group Neuberger Berman in September 2014.

The luxury brand corporate office is now headquartered out of Marquee's New York City offices but its products will continue to be designed and produced in Italy.
