= Ellie Krieger =

American television host

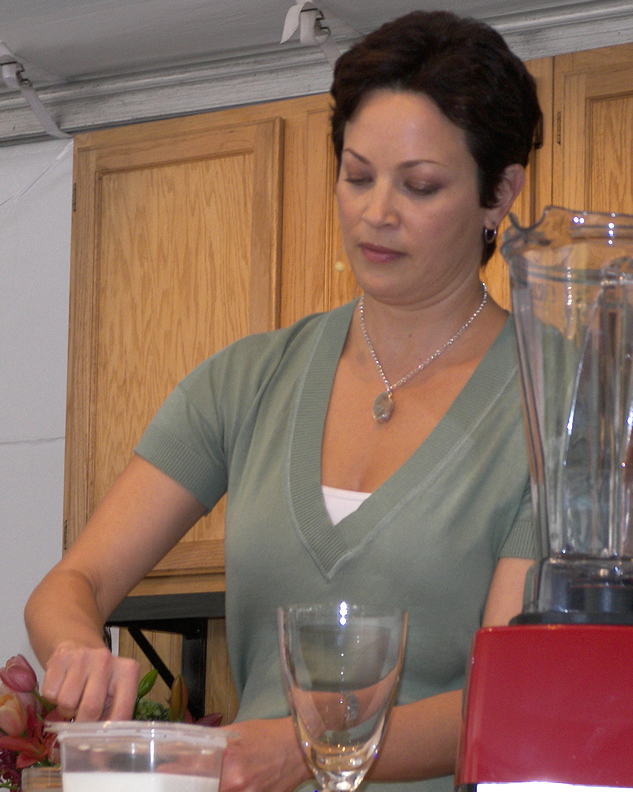
- Ellie Krieger at the 2009 Texas Book Festival
- Born: September 26, 1965 (age 60)
- Education: Cornell University and Columbia University
- Culinary career
- Television show(s): Food Network Healthy Appetite, PBS "Ellie`s Real Good Food"
- Award(s) won: IACP Award Winner, James Beard Foundation Award Winner
- Website: http://www.elliekrieger.com/

Ellie Krieger (born September 26, 1965) is an American registered dietitian and nutritionist. She is the host of Healthy Appetite with Ellie Krieger on Food Network, and Ellie's Real Good Food on PBS. She is also an author and has written several books on healthy eating.

== Biography ==
Krieger was a fashion model during her late teens and early 20s for the Wilhelmina Models agency. During her modeling career, she became conscious of what she was eating and decided to change her eating habits to live a healthier life.

Krieger has a bachelor's degree in clinical nutrition from Cornell University, and has a master's in nutrition from Columbia University. Krieger is a registered dietitian and nutritionist and was an adjunct professor at New York University in the Department of Nutrition, Food Studies, and Public Health. Additionally, she is the author of four books. She received the 2009 IACP Cookbook award and the James Beard Foundation Award for The Food You Crave. She was also named to Amazon’s Customer Bestseller List in 2008.

Krieger maintains her own blog and contributes to magazines such as Cooking Light, Food Network Magazine and Women's Health Magazine.

Krieger has her own practice. She is also on the advisory board of the Natural Gourmet Institute in New York.

== Personal life ==
She lives with her family in New York City.

== Bibliography ==
- Comfort Food Fix: Feel-Good Favorites Made Healthy (2011). ISBN 0-470-60309-7. Published by John Wiley & Sons.
- The Food You Crave: Luscious Recipes for a Healthy Life (2008). ISBN 1-60085-021-9. Published by Taunton Press.
- So Easy: Luscious, Healthy Recipes for Every Meal of the Week (2009). ISBN 0-470-42354-4.
- Small Changes, Big Results: A 12-Week Action Plan to a Better Life (2005). ISBN 0-307-33587-9.
