= Healthy Appetite with Ellie Krieger =

- Genre: Food
- Starring: Ellie Krieger
- Country of origin: United States
- No. of seasons: 5
- No. of episodes: 65

Production
- Executive producer: Rachel Purnell
- Production company: Pacific Television

Original release
- Network: Food Network
- Release: June 17, 2006 – present

Healthy Appetite with Ellie Krieger is a television series on Food Network airing since 2006 and hosted by Ellie Krieger.
