= Everyday Food =

- Editor: Sarah Carey
- Former editors: Anna Last, Sandy Gluck
- Categories: Food
- Frequency: 10 per year (8 per year in 2003) (5 per year in 2013)
- Total circulation: 1,058,521 (2011)
- Founded: 2003
- Final issue: December 2013
- Company: Martha Stewart Living Omnimedia
- Language: English
- Website: www.everydayfoodmag.com
- ISSN: 1544-6395

Everyday Food (from the test kitchens of Martha Stewart Living) was a digest size cooking magazine and PBS public television program published and produced by Martha Stewart Living Omnimedia (MSLO). Both feature quick and easy recipes targeted at supermarket shoppers and the everyday cook.

== History and profile ==
Everyday Food was established in 2003. It stopped stand-alone subscriptions and became a bi-monthly supplement packaged with Martha Stewart Living in 2013, while also continuing to provide digital content online and through the tablet app "Martha's Everday Food".

In August 2004, the Everyday Food television show on PBS was announced. It aired for six seasons from Jan 2005 through April 2010. A companion series, Everyday Baking from Everyday Food, with John Barricelli as the principal chef, premiered in January 2008 and ran for only one season of 13 episodes.
