= Katie Brown (TV personality) =

American television host

Katie Brown (born 1963 in Petoskey, Michigan) is an American home and gardening television show host, author, and trained art historian.

== Personal life ==
Brown grew up in a large family, having a brother and 2 sisters, 32 cousins, and 14 aunts and uncles. She is the granddaughter of the late senator Prentiss M. Brown and the daughter of Paul Walker Brown who was a member of the Board of Regents of the University of Michigan from 1971 until 1994, and ran unsuccessfully for lieutenant governor in 1974. One of her uncles is the late University of Iowa football coach Forest Evashevski. Another of her uncles is Prentiss M. Brown, Jr., who ran unsuccessfully for Congress in 1952, 1956, 1958, and 1960, and was the city attorney for St. Ignace, Michigan for 50 years.

She was educated as an art historian at Cornell University. She also raced on the Central Division Junior Olympic USSA ski team and had a catering business in Los Angeles.

She opened an antique store and cafe called Goat, located in Los Angeles and Mackinac Island, Michigan. Brown has been serving up dime-store domesticity on Lifetime Television's Next Door with Katie Brown since October 1997 and on public television's Katie Brown Workshop. She has also had successful shows on A and E and Style networks. She has opened her own workshops in Los Angeles, New York, and Bridgehampton. Katie Brown was also the editor and chef of Yahoo Makers. She also designed a successful line of home goods ranging from garden goods to bath towels and tableware in collaboration with Meijer Stores. She was a New York Times syndicated columnist and is a frequent guest star on national shows such as Good Morning America, The Today Show, Live with Kelly and Ryan, and Oprah. She is also the winner of a Gracie Allen Award for outstanding TV Host.

Brown has been married to TV executive and producer William Corbin since November 2003. They had their first child, a daughter named Prentiss, in May 2004. They adopted their second child, a daughter named Meredith, in November 2008.

== Publishing ==
Brown also has published numerous books on the subjects of cooking, gardening, and decorating: Lipton Sides A Guide To Inspired Meals With Katie Brown, Katie Brown Decorates, Katie Brown Entertains, Katie Brown Weekends, Katie Brown Outdoors, and Katie Brown Celebrates. Her latest book is a spiritual memoir "Dare to See".
