= The Martha Stewart Show =

American cooking talk show (2005–2012)

- Also known as: Martha
- Genre: Variety show Talk show
- Presented by: Martha Stewart
- Country of origin: United States
- Original language: English
- No. of seasons: 7
- No. of episodes: 1,162

Production
- Executive producers: Mark Burnett; Martha Stewart; Rob Dauber; Bernie Young
- Running time: 42 minutes
- Production companies: Mark Burnett Productions (2005–2010) (seasons 1–5); MSLO Productions; NBCUniversal Television Distribution

Original release
- Network: Syndication (via NBCUniversal Television Distribution) (seasons 1–5); Hallmark Channel (seasons 6–7)
- Release: September 12, 2005 – May 11, 2012

Related
- Martha Stewart Living

Martha, also known as The Martha Stewart Show, is an American cooking variety talk show hosted by Martha Stewart. The series premiered on September 12, 2005, in syndication until it was picked up by the Hallmark Channel in September 2010 as part of a larger deal that turned over most of the cable network's daytime schedule to shows from Stewart's production company, MSLO Productions. It followed her previous syndicated show Martha Stewart Living that ran from 1993 to 2004. Unlike the previous show, Martha was taped before a studio audience at the Chelsea Studios in New York City, New York. It was distributed by NBC Universal Television Distribution in partnership with MSLO Productions. The series' production company came to a consensus with Hallmark to end Martha due to the rising costs. The last episode was shot on April 24, 2012, with it airing on May 11, 2012.

== Synopsis ==
Each episode includes several segments related to cooking, crafts, gardening, interior design, and other topics related to arts and crafts. The program also features celebrity guests.

== Production ==
In October 2024, Stewart voiced dissatisfaction with the show. According to Stewart, "Mark Burnett wanted a talk show with variety guests, and I really wanted my old format of 'how-to'".

== Broadcast history and release ==
The syndicated broadcasts aired Monday through Friday at various times on broadcasting markets. Reruns also aired on Fine Living Network prior to the channels transformation into the Cooking Channel. On Hallmark, the series also aired Monday through Friday but at the same time of 10:00 am EST.

On December 12, 2005, NBC Universal Domestic Television announced that it renewed the show for a second season.

On January 4, 2012, Hallmark announced that the show was canceled.

== Reception ==
=== Awards and nominations ===
Awards and nominations
Award	Year (Note: Indicates the year of ceremony)	Category	Nominee(s)	Result	Ref.
Daytime Emmy Awards	2006	Outstanding Service Show	Martha	Nominated	
Daytime Emmy Awards	2006	Outstanding Service Show Host	Martha Stewart	Nominated	
Daytime Emmy Awards	2010	Outstanding Lifestyle Program	Martha	Won	
Daytime Emmy Awards	2010	Outstanding Lifestyle/Culinary Host	Martha Stewart	Nominated	
