= Marquee Brands =

American Holding company

- Type: Holding company
- Industry: Brand management, fashion, home cooking
- Founded: 2014
- Key people: Heath Golden (CEO, as of June 2024)
- Owner: Neuberger Berman

Marquee Brands is an American brand management company that acquires and licenses consumer brands across categories such as home and culinary, fashion and lifestyle, expressive luxury, and active/outdoor. The company was established in 2014 by Neuberger Berman Private Equity and is backed by Neuberger Berman.

It has offices in New York City and in Redondo Beach, California. As of June 2024, its chief executive officer was Heath Golden.

== History ==
Marquee Brands was formed in 2014 as a platform for acquiring and licensing brands. In 2015, it acquired the heritage footwear brand Bruno Magli and the apparel brand Ben Sherman. In 2017, Marquee acquired the intellectual property for the BCBG portfolio of brands after BCBG Max Azria Group's bankruptcy process.

In 2018, the company acquired the Dakine intellectual property and arranged a long-term operating partnership for the brand following Dakine's bankruptcy-related sale process.

In 2020, Marquee participated in the acquisition of retailer Sur La Table through a joint venture with CSC Generation during Sur La Table's bankruptcy sale.

In January 2025, the company acquired Laura Ashley from Gordon Brothers; the deal was described as opening Marquee's first European headquarters in London. In November 2025, Marquee announced the acquisition of Stance and a licensing partnership with United Legwear & Apparel Co.

In August 2026, Marquee entered into an agreement to acquire Canadian apparel company Roots Canada in a deal that would take Roots private in conjunction with JM&A Design and Development as their operating partner.

== Brand portfolio ==
As of 2025, Marquee's portfolio has included brands such as Martha Stewart, Laura Ashley, Sur La Table, Emeril Lagasse, America's Test Kitchen, BCBGMAXAZRIA, BCBG, Ben Sherman, Bruno Magli, Totes, Isotoner, Destination Maternity, Motherhood, A Pea in the Pod, Dakine, Body Glove, and Stance.
