= Food 911 =

American cooking show

- Genre: Cooking show
- Presented by: Tyler Florence
- Country of origin: United States
- Original language: English

Production
- Running time: 30 minutes

Original release
- Network: Food Network
- Release: 13 April 2000

Food 911 is show hosted by Tyler Florence that has aired on the Food Network since 1999.

The premise of the a 30-minute-long show involves Florence traveling across the United States to help individuals overcome various cooking dilemmas in their homes. A typical show involves three different dishes. Participation in solving the problem varies by show, but Florence defers credit to his host regardless.
