= Martha Stewart Living Omnimedia =

American media and merchandising company

- Type: Privately held subsidiary (since 2015)
- Traded as: NYSE: MSO (1999–2015)
- Industry: Broadcasting; Internet; Merchandising; Publishing
- Founded: 1997 (29 years ago)
- Founder: Martha Stewart
- Headquarters: Starrett–Lehigh Building; New York City, New York, U.S.
- Key people: Martha Stewart; Carolyn D'Angelo; (President of Home Division, Marquee Brands); Yehuda Shmidman; (CEO)
- Products: Books and magazines; Home-decorating products; Home furniture; Television series
- Revenue: ▼US$ 160.7 million (2013)
- Operating income: ▲US$ -1.897 million (2013)
- Net income: ▲US$ -1.772 million (2013)
- Total assets: ▼US$ 148.367 million (2013)
- Total equity: ▼US$ 70.475 million (2013)
- Owner: Marquee Brands LLC (Neuberger Berman)
- Number of employees: 406 (February 2014)
- Website: martha.com

Martha Stewart Living Omnimedia Inc. (MSLO) is an American diversified media and merchandising company founded by Martha Stewart in 1997 and owned by Marquee Brands LLC since April 2019. It is organized into four business segments: publishing, Internet, broadcasting media platforms, and merchandising product lines. MSLO's business holdings include a variety of print publications, television and radio programming, and e-commerce websites.

== History ==
The company was founded in 1997 by Martha Stewart as an umbrella company for the various media and merchandising ventures linked to the Martha Stewart brand. It went public, via an initial public offering, on the New York Stock Exchange (NYSE) on October 19, 1999. The stock opened at US$18 a share, but shot up to $38 a share, making Stewart an instant billionaire.

On August 6, 2002, a class-action lawsuit was filed against the company for misleading investors by issuing materially false and misleading statements, and its officers using insider information to avoid losses. A settlement of $30 million was approved in 2007.

In 2004, the company previously recognized as expense its estimate of annual subscription-acquisition costs rateably throughout the year. After reviewing this matter with its independent certified public accounting firm and its audit committee, the company determined on October 26, 2004, to change the method of accounting for interim period expense recognition of its subscription acquisition costs. The company recognized subscription-acquisition costs in the period in which the acquisition efforts took place and restated the financial statements.

On February 19, 2008, the company announced that it had reached an agreement with celebrity chef Emeril Lagasse to purchase certain business assets for $50 million: $45 million in cash and $5 million in stock. With the exclusion of Lagasse's restaurant chain and his foundation, the deal consisted of the rights to television programs such as Essence of Emeril and Emeril Live, Emeril Lagasse's Cookbook library, the emerils.com website, and kitchen and food products.

Stewart had served as president, chairwoman and chief executive officer of the company until being forced to resign as a result of the 2001 ImClone insider trading case. As part of an agreement with the U.S. Securities and Exchange Commission, she was banned from serving in any role that would allow her to prepare, audit or disclose financial results of a public company until August 2011. In effect, this banned her from serving as an officer of her own company.

Stewart rejoined the board of directors of her namesake company in September 2011 and became its chairwoman once again in May 2012.

In 2012, Macy's sued MSLO and J.C. Penney after the two companies decided, in 2011, to partner up and open up what would be called "Martha Stewart Home Shops". Macy's sued MSLO for "breach of contract" and sued J.C. Penney for "interfering with its agreement with Martha Stewart". Both of these lawsuits were combined in December 2013. Macy's goal was to stop J.C. Penney from selling MSLO merchandise that was supposed to be sold exclusively at Macy's. Macy's settled a portion of its lawsuit with MSLO over a home-products deal, however, Macy's continues to sue J.C. Penney. MSLO did not disclose the terms of the settlement. This lawsuit cost between "$7 million and $8 million in legal costs", according to MSLO's chief executive officer Daniel Dienst.

The Omnimedia media division stopped printing Everyday Food and Whole Living magazines while the Martha Stewart Living magazine moved from monthly to eleven issues per year in 2013.

On December 4, 2015, it was announced that Sequential Brands Group acquired MSLO. As a result of its acquisition, MSLO requested that the NYSE suspend trading and de-list the company's common stock.

In March 2017, MSLO partnered with Marley Spoon Inc. to have Martha & Marley Spoon meal kit service delivered by Amazon Fresh to customers in Dallas, Boston, New York, Philadelphia, San Francisco and Washington, D.C., metropolitan areas.

Sequential Brands Group agreed in April 2019 to sell MSLO, including the Emeril brand, to Marquee Brands holding company for $175 million with benchmarked additional payments. The lease on MSLO's headquarters in the Starrett-Lehigh Building in the Chelsea neighborhood of Manhattan was not included in the deal, but Marquee could assume the lease. Marquee Brands owns various companies, including the BCBG Max Azria brand, and is a subsidiary of asset manager Neuberger Berman.

== Publishing ==
The company has published various magazines, including:

- Martha Stewart Living (final print issue May 2022)
- Martha Stewart Weddings
  - special issues including the annual Holiday Cookies
- Blueprint: Design Your Life (canceled)
- Martha Stewart Kids (canceled)
- Martha Stewart Baby (canceled)
- Everyday Food (canceled 2013)
- Whole Living (canceled 2013)

Four newspaper columns — Ask Martha, Living, Weddings and Everyday Food — are distributed to newspapers throughout the U.S. via The New York Times Syndicate.

Current books are published through Random House's Clarkson Potter division; earlier titles were offered through subsidiaries of Time Warner prior to Stewart's spin-off of her business ventures from its corporate umbrella.

Publishing activities are a major source of income for the company, and accounted for roughly 60% of total revenue in 2005.

== Television and radio ==
=== Television ===
On 15 November 2005, MSLO named NBC's Sheraton Kalouria as president of television for MSLO. He was responsible for development and production of global programming for cable, broadcast, syndication and DVD as well as managing MSLO's development in the area of digital content for video on demand, web and mobile platforms.

- Martha (syndicated, daily)
- Everyday Food (PBS, weekly)
- Martha Stewart Living
- From Martha's Kitchen

Although MSLO retained no technical ownership stake in NBC's program The Apprentice: Martha Stewart, the company, its magazines, and various business ventures were prominently featured in each episode. Mark Burnett, who produced the series, is also co-producer of the company's daily talk show, Martha.

=== DVD ===
MSLO began marketing instructional DVDs in late 2005 through a partnership with Warner Bros., with the first five offerings oriented toward cooking and holiday and special-event planning.

=== Radio ===
MSLO operated a satellite radio channel, Martha Stewart Living Radio, on Channel 110 of SiriusXM Satellite Radio. Among programs on the channel there was a weekday-evening talk show co-hosted by Martha Stewart's daughter Alexis Stewart, Whatever with Alexis and Jennifer. Alexis left the radio show in June 2011 leaving Jennifer Koppelman-Hutt as the sole host. The show was cancelled in December 2011 and Koppelman-Hutt was terminated.

== Internet and direct commerce ==
The company's Internet and Direct Commerce segment includes its website marthastewart.com and a direct-to-consumer flower business, marthastewartflowers.com.

Through an agreement with Touchpoint, it designed a line of customizable greeting cards under the Marthascards banner, which were sourced and fulfilled by Touchpoint. This agreement was replaced by a new program with Kodak EasyShare Gallery in 2006.

In November 2006, MSLO announced its launch of Martha's Circle which is a lifestyle-oriented blog-advertising network whose charter members included Apartment Therapy, Smitten Kitchen, and Charles & Hudson.

Historically, the company also produced a print and online catalog, Martha by Mail, which was launched in 1997 and later rebranded as Martha Stewart: The Catalog for Living. Following Stewart's public fallout and the dot-com bubble burst in 2002, the company decided to discontinue both the online and print editions in 2003. The final print catalog was mailed in January 2004, and the online store closed in June of that year.

== Merchandising ==
MSLO additionally offers various home goods through its mass-market Martha Stewart Everyday brand in Kmart stores throughout the United States, and at Sears Canada in Canada. Furniture and paint are part of the company's specialty-retail-oriented Martha Stewart Signature brand through a partnership with Bernhardt Furniture Company and previously with Sherwin-Williams.

In October 2006, the company announced a new agreement with Lowe's to develop an exclusive interior paints line, which replaced its previous contract with Sherwin-Williams. The new line of paints, Martha Stewart Colors, launched in April 2007.

In April 2006, the company announced its plans to develop a new, upmarket merchandise line with Macy's, Inc. (at the time named Federated Department Stores) launched in Macy's stores in 2007.

The company also announced its intention to design a new paper-based crafts product line, Martha Stewart Crafts, with EK Success, initially planned for release in time for the Holiday 2006 season, which later debuted in early 2007 at Michael's stores.

In the fall of 2009, MSLO announced the development of a line of outdoor furniture, indoor organization, kitchen cabinets, and decor products at Home Depot.

On December 7, 2011, JCPenney announced the acquisition of 16.6 percent of the company's stock. JCPenney planned to put "mini-Martha Stewart shops" in many of its stores in 2013, as well as starting a web site together.

=== Wine ===
On September 14, 2007, MSLO announced that it had agreed to a partnership with E & J Gallo Winery to produce a wine brand with the label "Martha Stewart Vintage" for sale in six cities. The 15,000 cases to be sold included: 2006 Sonoma County Chardonnay, 2005 Sonoma County Cabernet Sauvignon and 2006 Sonoma County Merlot (for Atlanta, Boston; Charlotte, North Carolina; Denver, Phoenix, and Portland, Oregon).

MSLO also signed a contract with Costco to offer a series of food products developed from MSLO's library of recipes.
