= Tyler Florence =

American chef (born 1971)

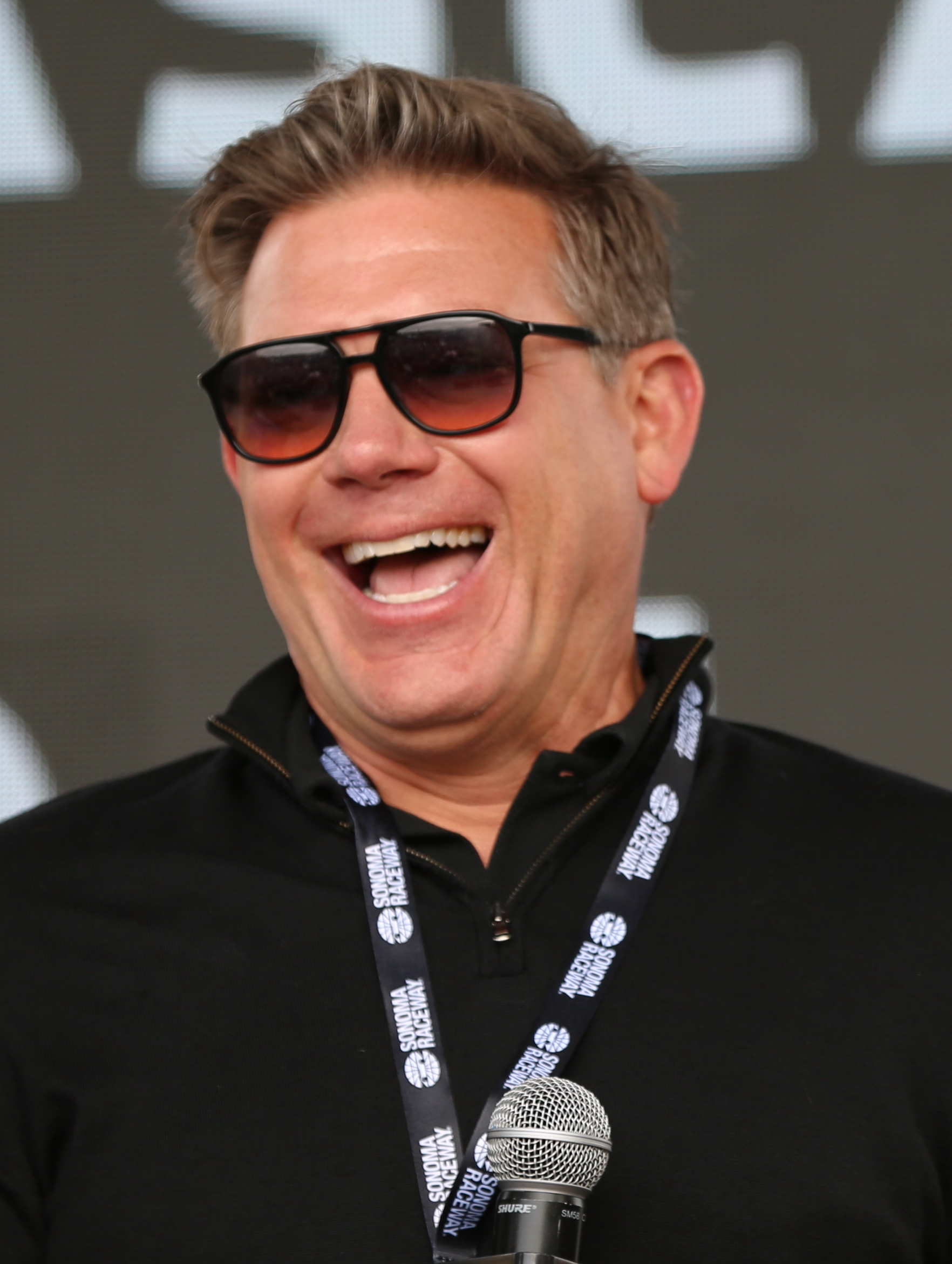
- Florence at Sonoma Raceway in 2025
- Born: March 3, 1971 (age 55); Greenville, South Carolina, US
- Education: Johnson & Wales University
- Spouse(s): Christie Leer (div.); Tolan Clark (2006–present)
- Children: 3
- Culinary career
- Cooking style: Italian, American, Tex-Mex, Contemporary
- Current restaurant(s): Cibo (New York City, NY) (fmr. Exec. Chef '95) Cafeteria in Manhattan (New York City, NY) Wayfare Tavern (San Francisco, CA) Miller & Lux (San Francisco, CA)
- Television show(s): Food 911 How to Boil Water Tyler's Ultimate The Great Food Truck Race (host) Worst Cooks in America Next Food Network Star Comeback Kitchen

Tyler Florence (born March 3, 1971) is an American chef and television host of several Food Network shows.

He graduated from the College of Culinary Arts at the Charleston, South Carolina, campus of Johnson & Wales University in 1991. He was later given an honorary doctorate from the university for his culinary success. He is the owner and executive chef of Wayfare Tavern in San Francisco.

== Professional career ==
=== Television ===
Florence was a presenter on Globe Trekker, hosted Food 911 and How to Boil Water, co-hosted Worst Cooks in America with Anne Burrell and currently hosts Tyler's Ultimate, The Great Food Truck Race, and Bite Club on the Food Network. Florence was a judge on Worst Cooks in America for seasons 6, 8, 12–13, and 15-present. Additionally in 2007, Florence and fellow chef Joey Altman co-hosted a celebrity chef cook-off to benefit Afterschool Alliance.

Outside of his work as presenter, he was featured on the ABC TV show Shaq's Big Challenge, which aired on July 17, 2007, and Momma's Boys, a reality show produced by Ryan Seacrest. He has also appeared on The Oprah Winfrey Show in a nationwide Sandwich Showdown. He has appeared a number of times on The Today Show, and was featured on The View in 2008. Florence serves on the board of the national nonprofit Afterschool Alliance, an organization that works to promote and to support quality after-school programs.

In 2023, Florence appeared on the reality TV series Special Forces: World's Toughest Test. He voluntarily left the show in the first episode.

=== Multimedia ===
In 2018, Florence directed a documentary about the 2017 California Wildfires called Uncrushable. It features first-person footage of first responders and interviews with those directly affected by the disaster. Florence has also appeared as a guest on the Barfly Podcast on March 3, 2021

=== Restaurants ===
In 1997 Florence worked as a chef at Restaurant 147 on West 15th Street, New York. In 2008, he developed a plan to open Bar Florence, in the Hotel Vertigo in San Francisco, California. In 2009 he opened a small chain of luxury kitchen supply stores in Northern California and developed four new restaurant concepts for the area: Wayfare Tavern in downtown San Francisco (formerly, Rubicon restaurant); Rotisserie & Wine (closed), a fast food restaurant in downtown Napa; with Sammy Hagar, El Paseo (closed) in downtown Mill Valley, California, an American tavern featuring ingredients only from Marin County; and a new modern American steak house, Miller & Lux that was opened as part of San Francisco's Chase Center and a new location at the Four Seasons Hualalai Resort.

=== Other ===
In 2008, Florence was named the Dean of Culinary Education at Copia, a now-defunct museum in Napa, California.

== Personal life ==
Florence has 3 children from two marriages. He has a son with ex-wife Christie Lear. He married his current wife Tolan Clark in December 2006, with whom he has a son and a daughter.

In 2007 Florence and his wife moved from New York City to Mill Valley, north of San Francisco, where in July 2008 Florence opened an eponymously named retail kitchen store.

== Books ==
- Real Kitchen, 2003
- Eat This Book: Cooking With Global Fresh Flavors, 2005
- Tyler's Ultimate: Brilliant Simple Food to Make Any Time, 2006
- Stirring the Pot, 2008
- Dinner at My Place, 2008
- Family Meal, 2010
- Start Fresh: Your Child's Start to Lifelong Healthy Eating, 2011
- Tyler Makes Pancakes, with Craig Frazier, 2012
- Tyler Florence Fresh, 2012
- Tyler Makes Spaghetti, with Craig Frazier, 2013
- Inside The Test Kitchen, 2014
- American Grill, 2024
