= Martha Stewart Living =

Magazine and former television program

- Editor: Elizabeth Graves
- Categories: Women's magazine
- Frequency: Monthly
- Total circulation: 9,000,000+ "readers" (2017)
- Founded: 1990
- Final issue: May 2022 (print)
- Company: People Inc.
- Country: United States
- Based in: Des Moines, Iowa
- Language: English
- Website: marthastewart.com
- ISSN: 1057-5251

Martha Stewart Living is a magazine and television program featuring American retail businesswoman, writer, and television personality Martha Stewart. Both the magazine and the television program focus on lifestyle content and the domestic arts.

== Magazine ==
Martha Stewart Living began as a quarterly magazine in 1990, published by Time Inc. The magazine was published monthly from mid-1994. Stewart took the magazine with her when she bought out her contract with Time Inc. in 1997, and Martha Stewart Living became the flagship brand of the Martha Stewart Living Omnimedia media empire. In 2015, Meredith Corporation assumed editorial and operational control of Martha Stewart Living and Martha Stewart Weddings.

Martha Stewart Living magazine featured lifestyle content around food, home decorating, entertaining, crafts/DIY, travel, and tastemakers, with monthly columns including "From Martha", "Good Things", "Good Living", and "Everyday Food". Martha Stewart was the Founder and Chief Creative Officer of the magazine. The magazine's editorial staff was led by editor-in-chief, Elizabeth Graves, and included a staff of industry-recognized editors including Sarah Carey, Editorial Director of Food & Entertaining, Melissa Milrad Goldstein, Beauty Director, and Melissa Ozawa, Features & Garden Editor.

During the period 2005–2013, Martha Stewart Living made a profit only in 2007.

The magazine discontinued its print edition and went online only in May 2022.

== Television program ==
Martha Stewart Living
- Genre: Lifestyle
- Presented by: Martha Stewart
- Country of origin: United States
- Original language: English

Production
- Running time: 30 minutes (weekends 1993–2004, weekdays 1997–1999); 60 minutes (weekdays 1999–2004)

Original release
- Network: First-run syndication Discovery Channel
- Release: September 1993 – September 2004

Related
- The Martha Stewart Show

The Martha Stewart Living television show debuted as a weekly half-hour syndicated program in September 1993. Intended to complement the magazine, the program featured Stewart as host of each episode where she presented segments on things such as cooking, gardening, craft making and decorating. It expanded to weekdays in 1997, became a full hour-long program in 1999 (with a 30-minute weekend edition) and went on hiatus in autumn of 2004 following Stewart's stock trading case and conviction.

The show was distributed by Group W Productions from 1993 to 1995, Eyemark Entertainment with Discovery Channel from 1995 to 2000 following the CBS-Westinghouse merger, then King World Productions from 2000 to 2004 following CBS' merger with King World. It was succeeded by The Martha Stewart Show after Stewart's release from prison in 2005 and ran until it was cancelled in 2012.

== Accolades ==
Both the magazine and the television show won numerous awards.
