= List of programs broadcast by Esquire Network =

The following is a list of original and syndicated programming that aired on the defunct Esquire Network, also formerly known as the Style Network.

== Former programming ==
=== Original ===
==== Style (Network) ====
- Fashion Mob (a 2012 special)
- Area (2002 — 2004)
- The Brini Maxwell Show ([remade for the network from;] 2004 — 2006)
- Shabby Chic (1999 — 2003)
- Married Away (2007 — 2009)
- Runway (1998 — 2001)
- Model ([TV] 1998 — 2001)
- What I Hate About Me (2010)
- I Propose (2007 — 2008)
- The Look For Less (2001 — 2006)
- Style Network's Tips([&Tricks] 2003 — 2013)
- Stripped (2004)
- Ruby (2008 — 2011)
- Dallas Divas & Daughters (2009)
- Instant Beauty Pageant (2006 — 2008)
- Split Ends (2006 — 2009)
- The Amandas (2012)
- Big Rich Atlanta (2013)
- Big Rich Texas (2011 — 2014)
- Built (2013)
- Chicagolicious (2012 — 2013)
- Clean House (2003 — 2011)
- Clean House New York (2011)
- The Dish (2008 — 2011)
- Empire Girls: Julissa and Adrienne (2013)
- Giuliana and Bill (2009 — 2013)
- Glam Fairy (2011 — 2012)
- How Do I Look? (2004 — 2012)
- Jerseylicious (2010 — 2013 [;new season 2017 on sister networks])
- Kimora: House of Fab (2013)
- Kimora: Life in the Fab Lane (2007 — 2011)
- Made in Chelsea (2012)
- Mel B: It's a Scary World (2010)
- Style Court (2003 — 2004)
- Style Exposed (2012 — 2013)
- Style Pop (2013)
- Style Star (2003 — 2012)
- Tia & Tamera (2011 — 2013)
- Too Fat for 15: Fighting Back (2010 — 2011)
- Whose Wedding Is It Anyway? (2003 — 2011)
- XOX Betsey Johnson (2013)

==== Esquire ====
- Boundless (2014-2016)
- Brew Dogs (2013)
- Esquire 80th Anniversary Special
- Esquire's Car of the Year
- Friday Night Tykes (2014-17)
- Friday Night Tykes: Steel Country
- The Getaway (2013-14)
- Knife Fight (2013-15)
- Lucky Bastards (2014-2015)
- Spotless
- Team Ninja Warrior (2016)

=== Acquired ===
- The A-Team
- The Agent
- Airwolf
- Alternate Route
- America's Next Top Model
- American Ninja Warrior
- Beowulf: Return to the Shieldlands
- Best Bars in America
- Bomb Patrol Afghanistan
- Boundless
- Burn Notice
- Car Matchmaker
- Chef Roblé & Co.
- City Girl Diaries
- CSI: Crime Scene Investigation
- Departures
- Dress My Nest
- Fashion Police
- Fashion Star
- Flipping Out
- Girlfriend Confidential: LA
- Going Deep with David Rees
- Horseplayers
- Hot Listings Miami
- House
- How I Rock It
- The Incredible Hulk (2014-15)
- Magnum, P.I.
- Miami Vice
- Million Dollar Listing Los Angeles
- Million Dollar Listing New York
- Momster of the Bride
- My Friends Call Me Johnny
- NCIS: Los Angeles
- Next Great Burger
- Ninja Warrior
- On the Table
- Our Big Fat Weight Loss Story
- Parks and Recreation
- Party Down
- Perfect Couples
- Peter Perfect
- Project Runway
- Psych
- Quantum Leap
- Queer Eye
- Rachel Ashwell's Shabby Chic
- Resale Royalty
- Risky Listing
- Ruby
- The Runner-Up
- Running in Heels
- Running of the Bulls
- Sex and the City
- The Short Game
- Sister, Sister
- The Six Million Dollar Man
- The Soup
- Spotless
- Supernanny
- Tacky House
- Top Chef
- This is Mike Stud
- Uncorked
- Ultimate Style
- Weekend Fix
- What I Hate About Me
- White Collar Brawlers
- Wicked Fit
- Women We Love
- Worst Week
