= Mick (DJ) =

American DJ and entrepreneur

MICK
- Genres: Hip-hop, open format
- Occupations: DJ, entrepreneur,
- Website: mick.co

Mick Batyske, known by his stage name DJ MICK (also sometimes styled as MICK) and formerly Mick Boogie, is an American DJ and entrepreneur. He is an A-list DJ and spun private parties for celebrities including Kanye West, LeBron James, Jay-Z and Will Smith. In addition to his mix tape releases, he has performed in venues internationally, including New York City, Dubai, Tokyo, Las Vegas, and Los Angeles. As an entrepreneur, he has invested in various start-up companies including Localeur, in which he is also an advisor and consultant.

== Early life and education ==
Mick was born in Youngstown, Ohio. He attributes his musical taste to the different songs he listened to as a child. His mother bought him records when he was young and he also learned to play the piano and drums while attending school. He attended John Carroll University where he earned both a bachelor's degree and MBA. While attending John Carroll, he worked as a radio DJ for WJCU 88.7, and later for Power 107.5 and Z107.9. While attending grad school, he decided to turn his music hobby into a career. After graduating college, he became the official DJ of the Cleveland Cavaliers. In 2008, he decided to move to New York City and ended up moving to Brooklyn, New York.

== DJ and performance career ==
Mick was the DJ at a private event for Jodie Foster at the 2011 Cannes Film Festival in Cannes, France. The same year he deejayed at the "Two Kings" influencer dinner held by LeBron James and Jay Z, an annual event that he has made several appearances at since 2008.

Mick expanded his performances in 2012 with a performance at Vibe's Magazine 20th Anniversary party. He was also in attendance for Super Bowl XLVII where he performed alongside The Roots at the annual Madden Bowl party, an event that he also performed for 2013. His 2012 birthday party was an event that featured a set that he personally performed and a performance by DMC of Run DMC. He also performed at Brian Atwood's New York Fashion Week party at the Four Seasons and a party for Aerosmith's Steven Tyler at The Darby in New York City.

It was in 2012 that Mick began a one-year deejay residency at Hyde, inside the Bellagio in Las Vegas, Nevada. During one of his sets over Memorial Day weekend in 2012, Jennifer Lopez debuted her single Goin' In. He also started touring internationally, including traveling with VH1 in India to promote its revamped VH1 India channel. He also performed at Entertainment Weekly's annual EMMY Award party in Los Angeles and on MTV during the MTV Video Music Awards' Rap Fix show. His private performances in 2013 included a party hosted by Jay-Z and Beyonce during the NBA All Star Weekend in Houston, Texas and the Miami launch event of a new Audemars Piguet watch, hosted by the company's brand ambassador LeBron James.

== Music and production career ==
Mick began releasing mixtapes after college. His collaborations have included works with Jay-Z, Eminem and Peter Bjorn and John. His 2006 mixtape The Pre-Up, hosted by Eminem and The Alchemist (an early release of some tracks from Eminem Presents: The Re-Up), was cited by Rolling Stone as one of the top five hip-hop mix CDs of the year. In 2007, he worked with Little Brother on the mixtape And Justus for All.

Also in 2007, Mick collaborated with Busta Rhymes to pay tribute to deceased producer James "Dilla" Yancey on the mixtape Dillagence. Busta Rhymes referred to him as a "hip-hop historian" for putting together the project. Mick has presided over several critically acclaimed mash-ups, including Adele 1988 (which combines Adele's debut album with artists ranging from Naledge to Big Pooh) and Viva La Hova, which mashed up Jay-Z and Coldplay. In 2011, inspired by the A Tribe Called Quest documentary Beats, Rhymes, & Life, Mick released Excursions: A Tribe Called Quest mixtape.

In 2010, Mick began the release of a yearly mixtape called Summertime in which he collaborates with his childhood idol DJ Jazzy Jeff. The series has featured new and unreleased material from Will Smith. The same year, Mick started his twice-annual collaboration with Stylecaster called Sounds From The Front Row for New York Fashion Week.

Mick was hired by HBO in 2011 to produce and mix the How To Make It In America soundtrack with Scott Vener. In 2012, Mick released a mix called Obamify, a compilation mix of Barack Obama's playlist on Spotify. Also in 2012, Mick collaborated with photographer Jonathan Mannion to pay tribute to his childhood inspiration, The Beastie Boys, with a mixtape entitled Grand Royal. Gwyneth Paltrow also listed his remix "Lost Part 2" as one of her favorite songs to travel to. Mick is the music supervisor and curated the soundtrack for NBA Live 14. He was also nominated for an award by the Guild of Music Supervisors in 2014.

=== Select discography ===
Year	Title	Notes
2014	Summertime Volume 5	Collaboration with DJ Jazzy Jeff
2013	Sounds From The Front Row	Collaboration with Stylecaster
2013	Summertime Volume 4	Collaboration with DJ Jazzy Jeff
2013	SlamXMick Art Basel	Collaboration with SlamXHype
2013	SXSWi Interactive 2013	Collaboration with Tristan Walker. Music chosen by leaders in the tech and entrepreneur community.
2013	NBA Live 2014	Mixtape for EA Sports
2009	Re-Living Thing	Collaboration with Peter Bjorn and John
2009	UKNOWBIGSEAN	
2009	Biggie: Unbelievable	Collaboration with Diddy.
2009	2009:Grammy Remix Project	Mick Boogie and Terry Urban mixtape compilation of the 2009 Grammy nominees.
2008	1988	Mixtape with Adele.
2008	Viva La Hova	Mix tape with Jay-Z and Coldplay.
2007	Dilla-Gence	Mixtape with Busta Rhymes.
2007	And Justice For All	Little Brother mixtape. Also worked as A&R.
2007	The Graduate	Kanye West mixtape.
2006	The Pre-Up	Collaboration with Eminem and various artists. Includes pre-releases from Eminem Presents: The Re-Up.
2006	Kick In The Door	Collaboration with Joey Fingaz and The Kickdrums featuring Jay-Z, Lupe Fiasco, Mobb Deep, Rick Ross, and various other artists.

== Business career ==
Mick is an entrepreneur and has invested in various startup companies. In 2007 he co-founded Motivation Boutique, a hip-hop clothing store located in Ann Arbor, Michigan. It is located within the campus of the University of Michigan and launched an online store in 2009. He is also known for branding and marketing, having spoken at events such as South by Southwest, New York University, and Digital DUMBO. He has consulted on projects for HBO and scored national television commercials for Adidas. He also starred in a national TV commercial for Microsoft Bing that premiered during the 2011 MTV Video Music Awards. Additional appearances include City Girl Diaries and Rap Fix Live. As an investor, Mick has been involved with the startup of numerous companies including Localeur, Dart, and Stublisher.

Mick brought his entrepreneurship and mixing together in 2013 with the release of SXSWi Interactive 2013. The mixtape featured 24 songs and chosen by leaders in the tech and entrepreneurial community, including social media consultant Gary Vaynerchuk.
