= James Van de Velde =

James Van de Velde is the name of:

- James Oliver Van de Velde (1795–1855), Roman Catholic Bishop of Chicago between 1849 and 1853
- James Van de Velde (Yale lecturer), former person of interest in the murder of Suzanne Jovin
