= Trish Suhr =

American actress (born 1974)

- Born: Patricia Kelley Suhr; December 30, 1974 (age 51); Middlesboro, Kentucky, U.S.
- Spouses: Dave McCoul (m. 2010; div. 2019) Jayce Fincher (m. 2020)

Patricia Kelley "Trish" Suhr (born December 30, 1974, in Middlesboro, Kentucky) is an American stand-up comedian, actress, television personality, and expert best known as the "Yard Sale Diva" on Clean House, a home improvement television show on Style Network. In January 2018, she began hosting the Daily Draw drawings nightly on GSN.

== Career ==
Suhr toured the US in 2018. She was the "Yard Sale Diva" on more than 300 episodes of Style Network's Clean House. She was a guest on NBC's The Office and Comedy Central's Reno 911!, Suhr was a regular on FOX's syndicated series Hollywood Today Live. She was a recurring guest host on ABC's FABLife alongside Tyra Banks and Chrissy Teigen as well as on 20th Television's The New Ricki Lake Show.

She leads the Country Cool Comedy Tour. Suhr also lends her point of view as co-host of a podcast.

Suhr also voiced Bobby June on the "Bless Your Heart" segment of Blaine County Talk Radio in Rockstar Games' Grand Theft Auto V.

Suhr is a regular contributor to Extra, Good Day LA, Good Day NY as well as a variety of magazines and as the host of National Lampoon’s Gamers, WE's Take My Kids Please, CMT's Family Secrets and Lifetime's Great American Cook-off. Known for her quick wit and razor-sharp perspectives, Suhr frequently offers commentary for popular specials on outlets including ABC (Good Morning America), Bravo, E!, CMT, and VH-1. Suhr can be seen every weeknight hosting Game Show Network's Daily Draw since 2018.

Trish hosts “Find my Country House” on Hulu.

== Personal life ==
Suhr married Dave McCoul on May 15, 2010, in Cancun, Mexico. They were divorced in 2019.

Suhr married her second husband, Jayce Fincher, the bass guitarist for the Marvelous 3, on June 30, 2020, in Topanga, California. She currently lives in Los Angeles with her husband and their two dogs.
