= Clean House New York =

- Genre: Reality
- Starring: Michael Moeller; Nina Ferrer; Duncan Schieb; Elyse Luray
- Country of origin: United States
- No. of seasons: 1
- No. of episodes: 10

Production
- Executive producers: Glenda Hersh; Kim McKoy; Stephanya Bareham; Steven Weinstock
- Production company: True Entertainment

Original release
- Network: Style Network
- Release: October 17 – December 19, 2011

Related
- Clean House

Clean House New York is an American reality television series on the Style Network. The series premiered on October 17, 2011 and is a spin-off of Clean House. Clean House New York follows New York designers and former HGTV Design Star competitors Nina Ferrer and Michael Moeller, along with their work crew, as they help families across the city clean up their homes.

== Episodes ==
No.	Title	Original release date
1	"No Sex in the City"	October 17, 2011
The team assists a couple in Brooklyn as the clutter in their home is damaging their marriage.
2	"Confessions of a Shoe-aholic"	October 24, 2011
A thrift shopper is keeping piles of clothing and over 500 pairs of shoes in her home before the team comes to help.
3	"Bed Bugs and Beyond"	October 31, 2011
The team helps a therapist and her daughter discover an infestation of bed bugs under all their unnecessary junk.
4	"A Jerseylicious Bargain"	November 7, 2011
Briella Calafiore from Jerseylicious gets help from the team as she prepares to move.
5	"West Village of Vintage"	November 14, 2011
A person who has a love for fashion is drowning in their home with the mountains of clothes all over.
6	"9 Clutter Bugs and Counting"	November 21, 2011
The team helps a family get it together.
7	"80s Blast From the Past"	November 28, 2011
The team helps a family located in Staten Island as they create their own 1980s-theme playroom but all the junk within the basement halts construction.
8	"Night of the Living Mess"	December 5, 2011
A couple in New York clean up their gothic style apartment in order to get the careers of their dreams.
9	"Junk Man Blues"	December 12, 2011
A guy located in Brooklyn cleans up his apartment so his new girlfriend can move in with him.
10	"Eagles Flew Over the Cuckoo's Nest"	December 19, 2011
The team assists an elder Long Island couple clean up their home.
