= Morgan Spector =

American actor (born 1980)

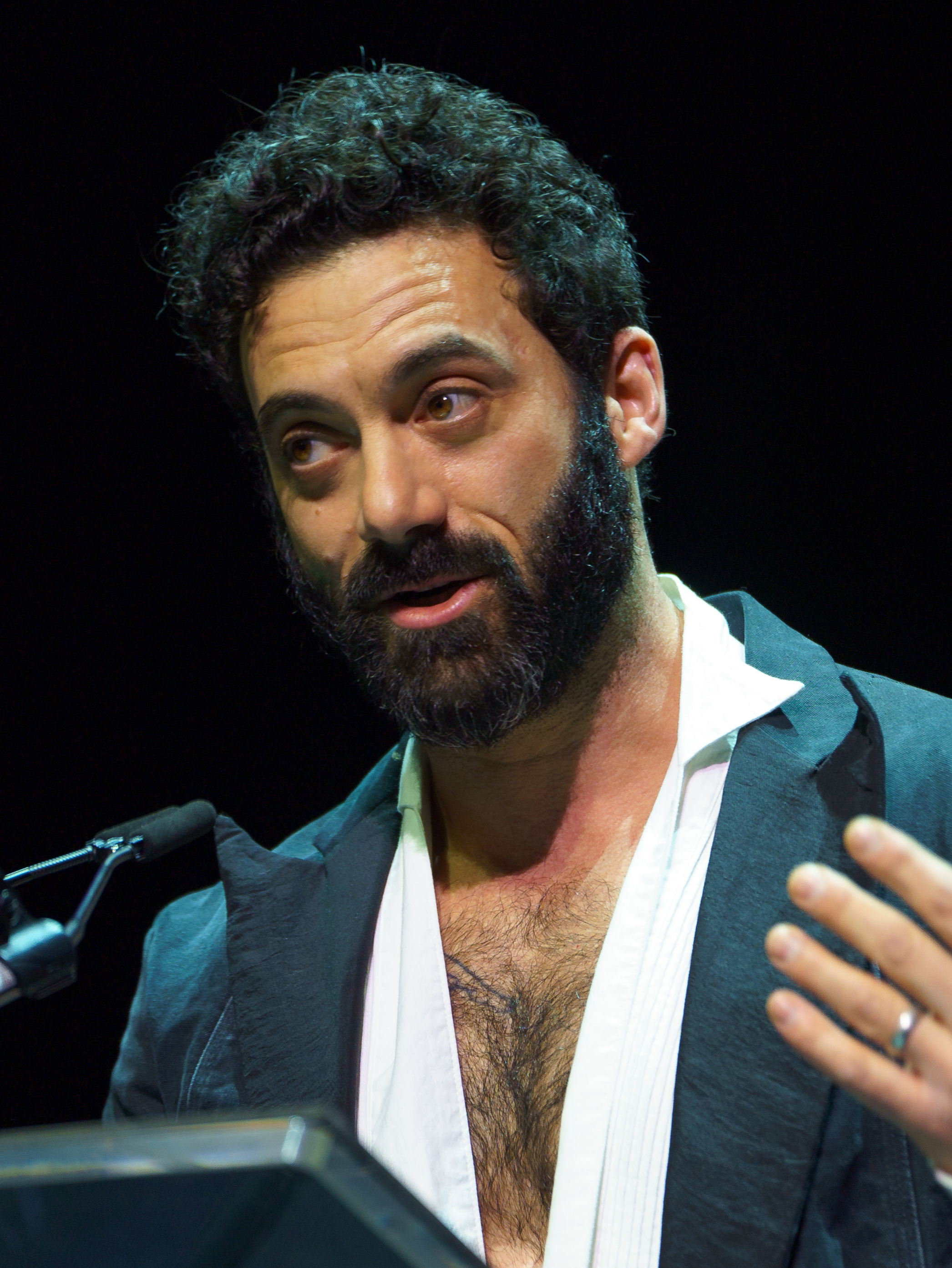
- Spector at SXSW in 2024
- Born: October 4, 1980 (age 46); Santa Rosa, California, U.S.
- Education: Reed College (BA); American Conservatory Theater (MFA)
- Occupation: Actor
- Years active: 2004–present
- Spouse: Rebecca Hall (m. 2015)
- Children: 1

Morgan Spector (born October 4, 1980) is an American actor. He first gained recognition for his appearances in the television series Homeland (2018) and The Plot Against America (2020) as well as the films Christine (2016), A Vigilante (2018), and Boston Strangler (2023). He has since starred in the HBO historical drama The Gilded Age (2022–present).

== Early life and education ==
Spector grew up in Guerneville, California. His father was an attorney and his mother worked in public education as a teacher and then as an administrator. Spector's father is Jewish; his paternal grandmother was an actress in the New York Yiddish Theatre District. His mother is of mostly Irish Catholic descent.

Spector acted for the first time in community theater at the age of eight; and later acted in high school and college productions.

After graduating from Reed College, in Portland, Oregon, he enrolled in the acting school of the American Conservatory Theater, in San Francisco. He next pursued work in regional theater, including a tour in The Lion King. In 2006, he moved to New York City.

== Career ==
In 2010, Spector made his Broadway debut as Rodolpho in Gregory Mosher's revival of Arthur Miller's play A View from the Bridge. He was originally cast in a bit part, but moved into the major role when the actor scheduled for it was injured during previews. In 2012 he played the role of Boris in The Russian Transport, by Erika Sheffer. It was produced Off-Broadway by The New Group.

In 2014, he co-starred with Rebecca Hall in a Broadway revival of Sophie Treadwell's Machinal. They later married; they appeared together on stage in New York again in June 2017, in Clare Lizzimore's play Animal. They have also appeared together on-screen in the 2016 drama Christine and the 2017 film Permission.

In 2018, Spector starred alongside Olivia Wilde in the drama A Vigilante. In 2019, he starred alongside Gina Torres in the legal drama Pearson on USA Network, a spin-off of Suits.

In 2020, he starred in the HBO miniseries adaptation of Philip Roth's The Plot Against America, alongside Winona Ryder. In 2022, he also headlined alongside Cynthia Nixon and Christine Baranski in HBO's The Gilded Age.

== Personal life ==
In September 2015, Spector married actress Rebecca Hall, whom he had first met the year before during their work together in the Broadway play Machinal. Their first child was born in 2018.

Spector is a member of the Democratic Socialists of America and helped produce the documentary, The Big Scary "S" Word. In 2024, along with 30 other artists, Spector participated in publicly reading the dossier of South Africa's genocide case against Israel, which was brought before the International Court of Justice. The reading was organised by Palifest.

In September 2025, Spector signed an open pledge with Film Workers for Palestine promising not to work with Israeli film institutions "that are implicated in genocide and apartheid against the Palestinian people."

== Filmography ==
=== Film ===
Year	Title	Role	Notes	Ref.
2004	Raspberry Heaven	Kurt Callaway		
2010	The Last Airbender	Lead Fire Nation Soldier		
2011	Musical Chairs	Kenny		
2013	All Is Bright	Vladimir		
2013	Burning Blue	William Stephensen		
2014	Grand Street	Nino		
2014	The Drop	Andre		
2016	Christine	Dr. Parsons		
2016	Chuck	Sylvester Stallone		
2017	Great Choice	Waiter		
2017	Split	Derek		
2017	Man with Van	Kier		
2017	Permission	Reece		
2018	A Vigilante	Sadie's Husband		
2021	With/In: Volume 1		Segment: "Mother!!"; also director	
2022	Nanny	Adam		
2023	Boston Strangler	James McLaughlin		
2024	I Don't Understand You	Massimo		
2026	Caity	Paul		
2026	Moonfish		Also executive producer	

=== Television ===
Year	Title	Role	Notes	Ref.
2009–2010	Law & Order: Criminal Intent	Player #1/Tech	2 episodes	
2010	How to Make It in America	Scott	2 episodes	
2011–2013	Person of Interest	Peter Yogorov	5 episodes	
2013	Do No Harm	Roman Spektor	Episode: "Morning, Sunshine"	
2013	Orange Is the New Black	Patrick	Episode: "Lesbian Request Denied"	
2013	Boardwalk Empire	Frank Capone	4 episodes	
2013	Zero Hour	Golem	3 episodes	
2014	Unforgettable	Dean	Episode: "Cashing Out"	
2015	Allegiance	Victor Dobrynin	13 episodes	
2015–2016	Friday Night Tykes	Narrator	20 episodes	
2016	Friday Night Tykes: Steel Country	Narrator	12 episodes	
2017	The Mist	Kevin Copeland	10 episodes	
2018	Homeland	Dante Allen	Main role (season 7)	
2018	Suits	Mayor Bobby Novak	Episode: "Good-Bye"	
2019	Pearson	Mayor Bobby Novak	Main role	
2020	The Plot Against America	Herman Levin	Main role	
2022–present	The Gilded Age	George Russell	Main role	
2024	Solar Opposites	Buttercup		
2025	Black Rabbit	Campbell	Recurring role	

=== Theatre ===
Morgan Spector has appeared in theatre productions both on and off Broadway.

Year	Title	Role	Venue	Ref.
2010	A View from the Bridge	Rodolpho	Cort Theatre, Broadway	
2012	Russian Transport	Boris	Acorn Theatre, Off-Broadway	
2012	Harvey	Lyman Sanderson M.D.	Studio 54, Broadway	
2014	Machinal	A Lover	American Airlines Theatre, Broadway	
2016	Ironbound	Performer	Rattlestick Theater, Off-Broadway	
2016	Incognito	Performer	New York City Center, Off-Broadway	
2017	Animal	Tom	Atlantic Stage 2, Off-Broadway	
2017	Fallen Angels	Maurice Duclos	American Airlines Theatre, Broadway	

== Awards and nominations ==
Morgan Spector has been nominated both television and theatre awards.

Year	Association	Category	Project	Result	Ref.
2012	Drama Desk Award	Outstanding Featured Actor in a Play	Russian Transport	Nominated	
2021	Critics' Choice Television Awards	Best Actor in a Movie/Miniseries	The Plot Against America	Nominated	
2023	Screen Actors Guild Awards	Outstanding Ensemble in a Drama Series	The Gilded Age	Nominated	
