= Permission (film) =

2018 American romantic comedy-drama film

- Theatrical release poster
- Directed by: Brian Crano
- Written by: Brian Crano
- Produced by: Margot Hand; Rebecca Hall; Giri Tharan; Joshua Thurston
- Starring: Rebecca Hall; Dan Stevens; Gina Gershon; François Arnaud; Morgan Spector; David Joseph Craig; Jason Sudeikis
- Cinematography: Adam Bricker
- Edited by: Matthew Friedman
- Music by: Thomas Bartlett; Joan As Police Woman
- Production companies: Ball & Chain Productions
- Distributed by: Good Deed Entertainment
- Release dates: April 22, 2017 (Tribeca Film Festival); February 9, 2018 (United States)
- Running time: 96 minutes
- Country: United States
- Language: English

Permission is a 2017 American romantic comedy-drama film written and directed by Brian Crano. The film stars Rebecca Hall as a woman on the brink of a marriage proposal from her boyfriend (Dan Stevens), but is impeded by the suggestion of her brother (David Joseph Craig) and his life partner (Morgan Spector) to "test date" other men before she ultimately settles down. Meanwhile, the film also follows the relationship of the gay couple as they decide whether or not to become parents.

== Cast ==
- Rebecca Hall as Anna, Hale's sister and Will's girlfriend
- Dan Stevens as Will, Anna's boyfriend and Reece's co-worker
- David Joseph Craig as Hale, Anna's brother and Reece's boyfriend
- Morgan Spector as Reece, Hale's boyfriend and Will's co-worker
- Gina Gershon as Lydia
- Jason Sudeikis as Glenn
- Bridget Everett as Charlie
- François Arnaud as Dane
- Raúl Castillo as Heron
- Sarah Steele as Stevie
- Michelle Hurst as Dr. Bennett

== Release ==
Permission acquired international distribution rights from London-based Film Constellation.

The film premiered at the Tribeca Film Festival to positive reviews. Good Deed Entertainment acquired the U.S. distribution rights. The film was released in the United States on February 9, 2018.

== Reception ==
On review aggregator website Rotten Tomatoes, the film holds an approval rating of 67% based on 45 reviews, and an average rating of 6.2/10. The critical consensus reads: "Permission holds together in spite of its uneven narrative thanks to eminently watchable work from leads Rebecca Hall and Dan Stevens." On Metacritic, the film has a weighted average score of 62 out of 100, based on 15 critics, indicating "generally favorable reviews".
