= Glam Fairy =

US television series

- Genre: Reality
- Presented by: Alexa Prisco
- Country of origin: United States
- Original language: English
- No. of seasons: 2
- No. of episodes: 20

Production
- Executive producers: Alex Duda; Anthony Dominici; Merah Chung; Sarah Weidman
- Running time: 42 minutes
- Production company: Endemol USA

Original release
- Network: Style Network
- Release: October 23, 2011 – December 16, 2012

Related
- Jerseylicious

Glam Fairy is an American reality television series on the Style Network that premiered on October 23, 2011. A spinoff to Jerseylicious, the series follows Alexa Prisco as she uses her New Jersey style to provide women with makeovers.

== Cast ==
- Alexa Prisco: "The Glam Fairy"
- Jon Kuuiiitlu: "The Right-Hand Fairy"
- Briella Calafiore: "The Dramalicious Fairy"
- Sharie Manon: "The Sexy, Confident Fairy"
- Alexa aka A2: "The Glam Fairy in Training"
- Glamo: "The Resident Stylist"
- Jessica Romano: "The Ditzy Fairy"
- Danny Ziegler: Alexa's fiancé
- Victoria Doroshenko

== Episodes ==
=== Series overview ===
Season	Episodes	Originally released	
Season	Episodes	First released	Last released
1	10	October 23, 2011	January 15, 2012
2	10	October 7, 2012	December 16, 2012

=== Season 1 (2011–12) ===
No. overall	No. in season	Title	Original release date
0	0	"Pilot"	January 30, 2011
1	1	"Meet The Fairies"	October 23, 2011
In the opener, Alexa and her team of Fairies give makeovers to a group of frumpy moms in preparation for a night out.
2	2	"Glitter Gone Bad"	October 30, 2011
A fashion-challenged bride seeks help. Meanwhile, the workers argue over a photo shoot.
3	3	"Fairies and Queens"	November 6, 2011
A group of drag queens get a new look.
4	4	"Pole Dancing Fairies"	November 13, 2011
Alexa helps a woman, named Stefanie Mikkelsen, to create a pole-dancing exercise video. Sharie comes to terms with her past in pageants.
5	5	"Divorced Divas"	November 27, 2011
Three divorcees receive help on trashing their old wedding dresses. Jessica and Briella look into freezing their eggs. Sharie donates all her wedding dresses to engaged women.
6	6	"Fran-Tastic"	December 4, 2011
A motivational speaker wants to update her look. Briella helps Jon overcome his fears.
7	7	"2Divine Intervention"	December 11, 2011
A Latino Christian music group wants to go pop. Later, conflict brews after Alexa's boyfriend moves in.
8	8	"Model Meltdown"	December 18, 2011
A plus-size store is the scene of a pumped-up photo shoot. Glamo is mentioned on a trendy list.
9	9	"Ghosts & Glamazons"	January 8, 2012
Creating a new look for a female football team and paranormal activity surrounds Alexa's dog.
10	10	"Billboard Beauties"	January 15, 2012
A nonprofit organization needs a new billboard. Briella and Sharie clash over planning a party.

=== Season 2 (2012) ===
No. overall	No. in season	Title	Original release date
11	1	"Wedding Clashers"	October 7, 2012
12	2	"Clash of the Fairies"	October 14, 2012
13	3	"Even Fairies Get Fired"	October 21, 2012
14	4	"Under the Glam Top"	October 28, 2012
15	5	"Zombie Glam"	November 4, 2012
16	6	"Better Safe Than Sharie"	November 11, 2012
17	7	"Pride & Pregnant"	November 18, 2012
18	8	"Birthrights and Wrongs"	December 2, 2012
19	9	"Brides Revisited"	December 9, 2012
20	10	"A Fairy Tale Wedding"	December 16, 2012
