= Chicagolicious =

American reality television series

- MaCray Huff, Katrell Mendenhall, AJ Johnson and Austin Maxfield (from left)
- Starring: AJ Johnson
- Country of origin: United States
- No. of seasons: 1
- No. of episodes: 20

Production
- Executive producers: Alex Duda; Blake Levin; Merah Chung; Sarah Weidman
- Running time: 42 minutes
- Production company: Endemol USA

Original release
- Network: Style
- Release: June 11, 2012 – January 8, 2013

Related
- Jerseylicious

Chicagolicious is an American reality television series on the Style Network. The series debuted on June 11, 2012.

== Premise ==
The series follows AJ Johnson, owner of a thriving salon in Chicago, and his staff of hair stylists and makeup artists as they service elite clientele and solidify their place in Chicago society.

== Cast ==
=== Main cast ===
- AJ Johnson: owner of AJ's of Chicago.
- Katrell Mendenhall: a former model and lead make-up artist at AJ's salon
- Macray Huff: a full stylist and has expertise with extensions
- Austin Maxfield: the youngest of the salon; make-up artist
- Valincia Saulsberry: spent more time at AJ's salon than any other stylist; bumps heads with Katrell; been in the business for over 20 years

=== Supporting cast ===
- Niki Robinson: best friend and roommate of AJ; salon manager; she also sometimes clashes with new stylists at the salon
- Q Lacey: AJ's cousin; the salon's director of marketing and sales
- Howard Godfrey: the head barber at the salon
- Julie Darling: a client of AJ's; publicist who specializes in the lifestyle and luxury market
- Jennifer Knuth: Julie's junior associate; finishing her college degree in Arts Entertainment Media Management

== Episodes ==
No.	Title	Original release date
1	"Windy City Blow Out"	June 11, 2012
2	"Little Greenline"	June 18, 2012
3	"Photo Shop Flop"	June 25, 2012
4	"Beauty Show and the Beast"	July 2, 2012
5	"Birthdays and Breakups"	July 9, 2012
6	"Masquerade Ballers"	July 16, 2012
7	"Flowers and Feuds"	July 23, 2012
8	"Stylist on the Loose"	July 30, 2012
9	"Queen With Envy"	August 6, 2012
10	"Makeover Madness"	August 13, 2012
11	"Stylists Gone Wild"	October 16, 2012
12	"Makeup Shakeup"	October 23, 2012
13	"Couture Catastrophe"	October 30, 2012
14	"Immaculate Extension"	November 13, 2012
15	"Three Blind Dates"	November 20, 2012
16	"Gods and Bods"	November 27, 2012
17	"I Do Redo"	December 4, 2012
18	"Fall From Graceland"	December 11, 2012
19	"Hair Battle Royale"	December 18, 2012
20	"Salon Overboard!"	January 8, 2013
