= Clean House =

2003 American TV series

- Presented by: Niecy Nash; Tempestt Bledsoe
- Starring: Nina Ferrer; Michael Moller; Niecy Nash; Mark Brunetz; Allen Lee Haff; Linda Koopersmith; Michael Moloney; Jason Fedele; John Bentley; Matt Iseman; Trish Suhr; Tempestt Bledsoe; Joel Steingold; Didiayer Snyder
- Country of origin: United States
- No. of seasons: 10
- No. of episodes: 164

Production
- Camera setup: Single-camera
- Running time: 60 minutes

Original release
- Network: Style Network
- Release: September 3, 2003 – 2011

Related
- Clean House Comes Clean; Clean House: Messiest Home; Clean House New York

Clean House is a home makeover and interior design television show, originally broadcast from 2003 until 2011 which aired 10 seasons of programs on the Style Network. Originally hosted by Niecy Nash and later by Tempestt Bledsoe, the show brings a four-person cleanup-and-renovation crew to the homes of families to clean up clutter.

In 2010, Nash announced that she would be leaving the series; her final episode aired on December 1, 2010. Later that month, Style Network confirmed that former Cosby Show cast member Tempestt Bledsoe would take over as host. Her first episode aired on December 15, 2010.

== Series overview ==
=== Episode structure ===
Each episode begins with a short montage introducing the subjects of the makeover. The host guides family members through the process of letting go of things with the assistance of "Go-to-Guy," handyman Matt Iseman, "Yard Sale King," Joel Steingold and designer Didi Snyder. Previous seasons featured "Designer with all the magic" Mark Brunetz, "Yard Sale Guy" Allan Lee Haff, "Yard Sale Diva" comedic actress Trish Suhr, "Organizer" Linda Koopersmith, and "Designer" Michael Moloney.

The Clean House team will negotiate and make deals with family members in order to convince them to sell belongings. The excess belongings are sold at a yard sale to raise money for the makeover. The show's production budget matches up to $1000 of the yard sale proceeds to be used on the makeover, and supplies all paint, labor, and in later seasons, the organizing costs.

Commercial breaks are often trailed with segments featuring quick interior design tips directed at the viewer usually presented by Brunetz and Nash, and organizational tips presented by Suhr.

=== Behind-the-scenes ===
Debi Gutierrez filled in for Niecy Nash in four episodes in 2007, "The Blount Family", "The Cohen Family", "The Bunce Family, and "The Freitz Family", while Nash was away filming Reno 911!: Miami. Style network stated that they were not replacing Nash with Gutierrez.

In April 2015, some of the former cast members, including Niecy Nash, Mark Brunetz, Trish Suhr, and Matt Iseman, met up for a reunion and interview on The Hallmark Channel, discussing former home remodels, their time on the show, and past Clean House yard sales.

== Cast ==
=== Timeline of cast members ===
Cast members	Seasons									
Cast members	1	2	3	4	5	6	7	8	9	10
Niecy Nash	Main	Main	Main	Main	Main	Main	Main	Main	Main	
Mark Brunetz	Main	Main	Main	Main	Main	Main	Main	Main	Main	
Allen Lee Haff	Main	Main	Main	Main						
Linda Koopersmith	Main	Main	Main	Main						
Michael Moloney	Main	Main	Main							
John Bentley					Main					
Matt Iseman					Main	Main	Main	Main	Main	Main
Trish Suhr					Main	Main	Main	Main	Main	
Tempestt Bledsoe									Main	Main
Joel Steingold									Main	Main
Didiayer Snyder									Main	Main

=== Roles ===
Host

- Niecy Nash (season 1–9)
- Tempestt Bledsoe (season 9–10)
- Lisa Arch (backup, season 8–10)

Yard sale

- Allen Lee Haff ("Yard Sale Guy", season 1–4)
- Trish Suhr ("Yard Sale Diva", season 5–10)
- Joel Steingold ("Jack-of-All-Trades", season 9–10; "Yard Sale King", season 10)

Organizer

- Linda Koopersmith (season 1–4)

Handyman

- Matt Iseman ("Go-To Guy", season 5–10)

Designer

- Mark Brunetz ("Designer With All the Magic", season 1–9)
- Michael Moloney (season 1–3)
- Didiayer Snyder (season 9–10)

=== Guest cast ===
- Jason Fedele – Carpenter (2004-2005)
- Debi Gutierrez – Guest hostess, four episodes (2008)
- Kellie Shanygne Williams – Guest hostess, six episodes (2009)
- Tanya Whitford – Organizer (2004)
- Sean McEwen – Yard Sale Guy (2004)
- John Eric Bentley – Go-to-Guy (2006)
- Reign Morton – Yard Sale King (2009)
- Elijah Long – Go-to-Guy (2009)
- Kristin Casey – Designer (2009–2010)
- Jennifer Snowden – Designer (2010)

== Seasons ==
Season 1
US Premiere Date; Saturday, April 5, 2003	Niecy Nash and Mark Brunetz alongside Yard Sale Guy Allen Lee Haff, Organizer Linda Koopersmith, and Designer Michael Moloney, travel throughout Southern California helping messy families get rid of clutter, sell their discarded items at a yard sale, and use the proceeds to create a new interior design for their now clean house.
17 Episodes	Niecy Nash and Mark Brunetz alongside Yard Sale Guy Allen Lee Haff, Organizer Linda Koopersmith, and Designer Michael Moloney, travel throughout Southern California helping messy families get rid of clutter, sell their discarded items at a yard sale, and use the proceeds to create a new interior design for their now clean house.

Season 2
US Premiere Date; Wednesday, September 2, 2004	Nash, Brunetz, Haff, and Koopersmith team up once again for season two of the Clean House series to help messy homeowners in Southern California get rid of the clutter in their life. Also during this season we see recurring guest appearances from Organizer Tanya Whitford and Yard Sale Guy Sean McEwen.
7 Episodes	Nash, Brunetz, Haff, and Koopersmith team up once again for season two of the Clean House series to help messy homeowners in Southern California get rid of the clutter in their life. Also during this season we see recurring guest appearances from Organizer Tanya Whitford and Yard Sale Guy Sean McEwen.

Season 3
US Premiere Date; Wednesday, January 5, 2005	The original four cast members return for season three of the series; once again traveling throughout Southern California to help messy families get rid of clutter, sell their discarded items at a yard sale, and use the proceeds to create a new interior design for their now clean house.
11 Episodes	The original four cast members return for season three of the series; once again traveling throughout Southern California to help messy families get rid of clutter, sell their discarded items at a yard sale, and use the proceeds to create a new interior design for their now clean house.

Season 4
US Premiere Date; Wednesday, May 11, 2005	Nash and her seasoned team of Design Guru Brunetz, Yard Sale Guy Haff, and Organizer Koopersmith, return for season four of the series. The show continues to work with its winning formula of helping messy families get rid of clutter, sell their discarded items at a yard sale, and use the proceeds to create a new interior design for their now clean house.
14 Episodes	Nash and her seasoned team of Design Guru Brunetz, Yard Sale Guy Haff, and Organizer Koopersmith, return for season four of the series. The show continues to work with its winning formula of helping messy families get rid of clutter, sell their discarded items at a yard sale, and use the proceeds to create a new interior design for their now clean house.

Season 5
US Premiere Date; Saturday, August 26, 2006	Nash and Brunetz are joined by new cast members Yard Sale Diva Trish Suhr, and Go-to-Guys John Bentley and Matt Iseman, who replace the original cast members Haff and Koopersmith. In addition to helping messy families in Southern California get rid of clutter, the Clean House crew go on location to Northern California when they help a family in San Francisco.
19 Episodes	Nash and Brunetz are joined by new cast members Yard Sale Diva Trish Suhr, and Go-to-Guys John Bentley and Matt Iseman, who replace the original cast members Haff and Koopersmith. In addition to helping messy families in Southern California get rid of clutter, the Clean House crew go on location to Northern California when they help a family in San Francisco.

Season 6
US Premiere Date; Wednesday, December 5, 2007	Nash, Brunetz, Suhr, and Iseman reunite for the sixth season of the series. Also, while Nash is away on location for the filming of other projects she is temporarily replaced by guest hostess Debi Gutierrez for four episodes.
26 Episodes	Nash, Brunetz, Suhr, and Iseman reunite for the sixth season of the series. Also, while Nash is away on location for the filming of other projects she is temporarily replaced by guest hostess Debi Gutierrez for four episodes.

Season 7
US Premiere Date; Wednesday, August 8, 2008	During season seven Brunetz, Suhr, and Iseman are joined by guest hostesses Lisa Arch and Kellie Shanygne Williams, for thirteen and six episodes respectively. The entire team continue their journey throughout Southern California to help messy families get rid of clutter. Additionally, with the return of Nash the team will begin to help families outside of the state of California as they take the show on the road.
21 Episodes	During season seven Brunetz, Suhr, and Iseman are joined by guest hostesses Lisa Arch and Kellie Shanygne Williams, for thirteen and six episodes respectively. The entire team continue their journey throughout Southern California to help messy families get rid of clutter. Additionally, with the return of Nash the team will begin to help families outside of the state of California as they take the show on the road.

Season 8
US Premiere Date; Wednesday, October 7, 2009	The four-person crew return for season eight of the series; once again traveling throughout Southern California to help messy families get rid of clutter, sell their discarded items at a yard sale, and use the proceeds to create a new interior design for their now clean house. Which includes the home of Niecy Nash.
11 Episodes	The four-person crew return for season eight of the series; once again traveling throughout Southern California to help messy families get rid of clutter, sell their discarded items at a yard sale, and use the proceeds to create a new interior design for their now clean house. Which includes the home of Niecy Nash.

Season 9
US Premiere Date; Wednesday, July 7, 2010	The four-person crew return for season nine of the series; once again traveling throughout Southern California to help messy families get rid of clutter, sell their discarded items at a yard sale, and use the proceeds to create a new interior design for their now clean house. Nash, Brunetz and Suhr leave the show in 2011, and are replaced by Bledsoe, Snyder and Steingold
22 aired	The four-person crew return for season nine of the series; once again traveling throughout Southern California to help messy families get rid of clutter, sell their discarded items at a yard sale, and use the proceeds to create a new interior design for their now clean house. Nash, Brunetz and Suhr leave the show in 2011, and are replaced by Bledsoe, Snyder and Steingold

Season 10
US Premiere Date; Wednesday, May 11, 2011	The crew is back for a tenth season, cleaning and decorating messy houses across Southern California. Notable homeowner includes Jordan Burns of the band Strung Out.
16 aired	The crew is back for a tenth season, cleaning and decorating messy houses across Southern California. Notable homeowner includes Jordan Burns of the band Strung Out.

== Spin-offs ==
The show has spawned a spin-off series, Clean House Comes Clean, which showcases deleted/behind-the-scenes footage from previous episodes of the Clean House series. The series features commentary from Brunetz, Haff, Koopersmith, Suhr, and Iseman. Yearly, the crew also searches the country for homes that are the messiest, resulting in Clean House: The Messiest Home in the Country, and the excess proceeds go to charity. They use the show's money to decorate the house.
