= Friday Night Tykes =

- Genre: Reality; Docuseries; Sports
- Narrated by: Morgan Spector
- Country of origin: United States
- Original language: English
- No. of seasons: 4
- No. of episodes: 41

Production
- Executive producers: David Karabinas; Matt Maranz; Jason Sciavicco; Jake Laufer
- Producer: Laura Casey
- Camera setup: Multi-camera
- Running time: 43 minutes (without commercials)
- Production companies: 441 Productions; Electro-Fish Films, Texas Crew Productions

Original release
- Network: Esquire Network; USA Network
- Release: January 14, 2014 – March 21, 2017

Friday Night Tykes is a reality sports documentary television series on the Esquire Network. It was produced by 441 Productions, Texas Crew Productions (TCP) and Electro-Fish Films. It premiered on January 14, 2014, and ran for four seasons. The rights were transferred to USA Network after June 2017 upon Esquire Network's discontinuation. The entire series is also licensed to Peacock.

== Premise ==
Friday Night Tykes documents youth football, following teams in the Texas Youth Football Association on and off the field as they compete for the playoffs. Among the challenges the players, who are as young as 8, face are rigorous training drills, parental conduct, fans heckling, and balancing on-the-field expectations with childhood outside of football.
