= Killing of Suzanne Jovin =

1998 murder

Suzanne Jovin
- Born: January 26, 1977; Göttingen, West Germany
- Died: December 4, 1998 (aged 21); New Haven, Connecticut, U.S.
- Cause of death: Murder
- Education: Yale University
- Occupation: Student

On December 4, 1998, Suzanne Nahuela Jovin, a 21‑year‑old Yale University senior, was stabbed to death off campus in New Haven, Connecticut. She had been active in several campus organizations, volunteering as a tutor through the Yale Tutoring in Elementary Schools program, singing in the Freshman Chorus and the Bach Society Orchestra, co‑founding the German Club, and working for three years in the Davenport dining hall. The city of New Haven and Yale University have offered a combined $150,000 for information leading to the arrest and conviction of her killer. The crime remains unsolved.

== Biography ==
Suzanne Nahuela Jovin was born on January 26, 1977, in Göttingen, West Germany, to parents who had been hired to run the Max Planck Institute for Biophysical Chemistry. She attended the Theodor-Heuss Gymnasium in Göttingen.

At Yale she majored in international studies and political science.

== Murder ==
On Friday December 4, 1998, after dropping off the penultimate draft of her senior essay on the Islamic militant leader Osama bin Laden, Suzanne Jovin began preparations for a pizza-making party she had organized at the Trinity Lutheran Church on 292 Orange Street for the local chapter of Best Buddies, an international organization that brings together students and mentally disabled adults. By 8:30 p.m., after staying late to help clean up, she was driving another volunteer home in a borrowed university station wagon. Around 8:45 she returned the car to the Yale-owned lot on the corner of Edgewood Avenue and Howe Street, and proceeded to walk two blocks to her second-floor apartment at 258 Park Street, upstairs from a Yale police substation.

Sometime prior to 8:50 p.m. a few friends passed by Jovin's window and asked her if she wanted to join them at the movies. Jovin declined, stating that she planned to do school work that night. At 9:02 Jovin logged onto her Yale e-mail account and told a female friend in German she was going to leave some GRE books for her in Jovin's apartment building's lobby, once she had retrieved them from an unnamed person who had borrowed them from her. She also provided the access code for her door. This unnamed person has never been identified. Whether Jovin met this unnamed person that night remains unknown. At 9:10 she logged off. If she made or received any calls is unknown; calls within Yale's telephone system were not traceable. She wore the same soft, low-cut hiking boots, jeans, and maroon fleece pullover she had worn at the pizza party.

Very shortly thereafter Jovin headed out on foot to the Yale police communications center under the arch at Phelps Gate on Yale's Old Campus to return the keys to the car she had borrowed. Shortly before reaching her destination, around 9:22, Jovin encountered classmate Peter Stein, who was out for a walk. Stein is quoted by the Yale Daily News as saying, "She did not mention plans to go anywhere or do anything else afterward. She just said that she was very, very tired and that she was looking forward to getting a lot of sleep." Stein also said Jovin was not wearing a backpack, was holding one or more sheets of white 8 ½ x 11 inch paper in her right hand, that she was walking at a "normal" pace and did not look nervous or excited, and that their encounter lasted only two to three minutes.

Based on the timeline, Jovin is presumed to have returned the keys to the borrowed car at about 9:25. She was reportedly last seen alive at between 9:25–9:30 by another Yale student, on foot returning from a Yale hockey game, "walking north on College Street". However, it was later clarified, "It is unclear... whether Jovin was walking somewhere, waiting for someone or pausing to admire the holiday lights along the New Haven Green."

At 9:55 p.m. someone dialed 911 to report a woman bleeding at the corner of Edgehill Road and East Rock Road, 1.9 miles from the Yale campus, where Jovin was last seen alive. When police arrived at 9:58, they found Jovin fatally stabbed 17 times in the back of her head and neck and her throat slit. She was lying on her stomach, feet in the road, body on the grassy area between the road and the sidewalk. She was fully clothed and still wearing her watch and earrings, with a crumpled dollar bill in her pocket. Her wallet was later found to be still in her room. Suzanne Jovin was officially pronounced dead at 10:26 p.m. at Yale New Haven Hospital.

== Evidence ==
Many items and observations have been reported by the police and media as possible evidence over the thirteen plus years of the investigation, much of which has either been discredited, deemed hearsay or unreliable, or been explained. The most notable physical evidence appears to be:

1. DNA found in scrapings taken from under the fingernails of Jovin's left hand.
2. Jovin's fingerprints and an unknown person's partial palmprint found on a Fresca bottle in the bushes in front of where her body was found.
3. The tip of the knife used in the attack that was lodged in her skull.

The most notable observations appear to be:

1. "a tan or brown van stopped in the roadway facing east, immediately adjacent to where Suzanne was found."
2. "a man in his 20s or 30s with an athletic build, well-groomed hair, dark pants, a loose-fitting greenish jacket, running like his life depended on it in the opposite direction from where Suzanne Jovin was killed"
3. "A mysterious, nondescript 'someone,' whom Jovin mentioned in an e-mail she sent less than an hour before she was found stabbed" to whom she had lent a friend's GRE test study materials.

The only speculation about the murder weapon came on the March 1, 2000 broadcast of ABC's 20/20. According to host John Miller's voiceover: "The medical examiner would later identify only one of the 17 stab wounds as fatal. He would also determine that the murder weapon was a four to five inch nonserrated, carbon steel knife, when he discovered the tip of the blade lodged in the left side of her skull."

Though there have been no reports of anyone witnessing Jovin enter or exit any vehicle, it is generally assumed that Jovin had either forcibly or voluntarily entered one, as it was virtually impossible for her to have reached the intersection of Edgehill and East Rock Roads by foot in the short span of time that elapsed between when she was last seen alive and when she was found bleeding by witnesses nearly two miles away. The existence of the tan/brown van was not made public by the New Haven Police Department (NHPD) until March 27, 2001. Although members of the Yale faculty had reported the police were asking privately about the van at the inception of the investigation, no explanation has ever been given why it took more than two years to release the information to the public. And although the New Haven Register reported on November 8, 2001, that the NHPD had impounded a brown van as part of the Jovin investigation, no link has ever been confirmed.

The existence of the Fresca bottle came to light on April 1, 2001, by Hartford Courant reporter Les Gura. The only store in the vicinity of campus that sold Fresca that was still open at the hour Jovin was last seen alive was Krauszer's Market on York Street near Elm Street – precisely one block south of Jovin's apartment. Although Krauszer's maintained a video recording of its customers for security purposes, the police never asked to view their tape and have never reported seeking assistance from store employees or customers about whether they had seen anything unusual that night. The foreign palmprint has yet to be identified and public calls for DNA evidence to be extracted from it and other potential sources have gone unheeded.

The first mention of the existence of the fingernail DNA was on October 26, 2001, following a solicitation by the New Haven police for colleagues, friends and acquaintances of Jovin to come forward and give DNA samples voluntarily. No explanation has ever been given as to why it took nearly three years for the fingernail scrapings to be tested for DNA. On September 14, 2009, Jovin's parents wrote to Connecticut Governor M. Jodi Rell that "potential forensic investigations, made possible by significant advances in technology in the intervening decade, are not being carried out due to shortcomings in the Connecticut Forensic Science Laboratory." Rell's office admitted that the lab also had a backlog of 12,000 DNA samples that needed to be tested. The DNA results from material collected under a fingernail of Jovin's left hand remained unmatched until November 2009. It was determined at that time that the DNA matched that of a trace evidence technician in the Connecticut State Police Forensics Laboratory, and was the result of accidental evidence contamination at the lab.

At the end of June 2008 the Jovin Task Force revealed that only days after the crime: "A female motorist told police at the time that she was driving in the area of Whitney Avenue and Huntington Street at about 10 p.m. when she saw a white male sprint past her and disappear into the church property." As for why this testimony was withheld from the public for nearly a decade: "Sources said the police at the time showed her a photo of Yale Professor James Van de Velde — Jovin's thesis adviser, whom police had publicly identified as a suspect — to determine if he was the man she saw. They also took her in an unmarked van to Van de Velde's office so she could look at him in person. She told them Van de Velde was not the man she saw running, and investigators didn't contact her again, sources said." Subsequently, the Jovin Task Force began hanging a sketch of this person around the neighborhood in which he was spotted.

Task Force poster of man seen fleeing from scene released on July 4, 2008

On July 16, 2008, the Jovin Task Force provided further details of Jovin's final email, written in German to a female friend, about GRE test study materials Jovin would leave for her to pick up. "Jovin wrote that she would retrieve the books and leave them in the foyer of her apartment for the classmate to pick up, giving her classmate the code to her apartment in case Jovin was not in the building." The materials were never returned, nor has anyone ever come forward as the borrower, leading many to speculate the borrower may have possibly been involved in her killing. Furthermore, Jovin's specific use of the word "someone" when referring to the borrower implies to many she did not know this borrower very well.

== Investigation ==
Four days after the murder the name of Jovin's thesis advisor, James Van de Velde, was leaked to the New Haven Register as the prime suspect in the case. Fifteen months later, criminologist John Pleckaitis, then a sergeant at the New Haven Police Department, admitted to Hartford Courant reporter Les Gura: "From a physical evidence point of view, we had nothing to tie him to the case ... I had nothing to link him to the crime." Famed forensic scientist Henry Lee's offer to reconstruct the crime scene was accepted by the police but not carried out.

Based on subsequent questioning of the Yale community, and on Van de Velde's name being released prior to the completion of his police interrogation, it became apparent the NHPD had for undisclosed reasons become convinced that Van de Velde and Jovin must have been having an illicit or unrequited affair – a notion that friends of Jovin, including her boyfriend, considered wholly unlikely. Nevertheless, though not revealing any physical evidence or a motive, the NHPD continued to maintain that their naming of Van de Velde was not presumptuous. Yale, under the guidance of Yale College Dean Richard H. Brodhead, then chose to cancel Van de Velde's spring 1999 classes citing his presence as a "major distraction" for students, damaging his reputation and academic career.

In 2000 Van de Velde and colleagues strongly and eventually publicly encouraged Yale to hire their own private investigators to study the case. In December, 2000, under additional pressure from the Jovin family, Yale relented and hired the team of Andrew Rosenzweig, former chief investigator with the New York district attorney's office, and Patrick Harnett, a former commanding officer of the New York Police Department's major crime squad. It was at their insistence that the NHPD allowed the state forensics lab to analyze Jovin's fingernail scrapings for DNA. Neither the resulting DNA nor the Fresca bottle fingerprint were a match to Van de Velde, prompting Harnett to label Van de Velde "Richard Jewell with a PhD," a reference to an innocent man whose life was ruined by police publicity in 1996. Yale has not made its investigation public, nor explained its secrecy.

The NHPD responded by contacting the US Navy, Van de Velde's primary employer at the time, urging them to reconsider their contract work with him—going so far as to travel to Washington, DC to meet with Navy officials. A thorough review was conducted that resulted in Van de Velde being allowed to keep his job and his security clearance. Sensing the investigation had dead-ended on him, Van de Velde undertook a letter writing campaign urging the Connecticut state cold case unit to take over the case. When the Chief State's Attorney refused, Van de Velde began pressing the police to undertake additional state-of-the-art forensic tests on the evidence.

On September 1, 2006, nearly eight years after the murder, the Jovin investigation was officially classified a cold case and moved to Connecticut's Cold Case Unit. However, the case was never added to the Cold Case Unit web site nor was there any mention of the reward being offered—prompting Van de Velde once again to write letters of complaint. On November 29, 2007, Assistant State's Attorney James Clark admitted that the case had been secretly reassigned back to New Haven in June of that year, this time under the auspices of a handpicked team of four retired detectives. According to Clark: "no person is a suspect in the crime, and everyone is a suspect in the crime." Once again the case is said to be in the hands of Connecticut's Cold Case Unit, though once again there is no mention of it on their web site.

On December 8, 2012, a group of area residents presented the Jovin Task Force with potential evidence that Jovin's killer might have been a former Yale graduate student who, after telling friends he was convinced he would be imminently arrested for the murder, committed suicide. The Task Force declined to pursue the lead. These residents then filed a Freedom of Information request against New Haven and Yale; the scheduled May 31, 2013 hearing was then postponed at the request of the city.

In November 2016 two members of a television documentary team also petitioned the Connecticut Freedom of Information Commission for access to related law enforcement records. The matter was heard on April 17, 2017, and a decision rendered on September 1, 2017, denying the request. The Commission cited testimony of Assistant State's Attorney Marcia Pillsbury that "disclosure of the records would prejudice a prospective prosecution of Jovin's killer", finding that "a prospective law enforcement action is a reasonable possibility". In reporting on the decision, the Hartford Courant further elaborated that Jovin's clothing would undergo touch DNA testing, the FBI was re-involved, both new and prior witnesses were being interviewed, and a hypnotist was being hired to "interview a key witness who may have seen Jovin walking only minutes before she was murdered".

On December 2, 2018, just prior to the 20th anniversary of the murder, Yale's former head investigator, Andy Rosenzweig, finally broke his silence on the botched police investigation: “When people are fed a steady stream of reports that the police already know who committed the crime and will be making an arrest soon, they tend to think of their information as unimportant and probably wrong. Sadly, we’ll never know how many such sources in the Jovin case never came forward.” On December 27, 2019, in an attempt to force the State of Connecticut to finally make good on their decades old promise to DNA test the evidence using modern technology, and to shed more light on the "running man" person of interest, aka "Billy", blogger Jeffrey Mitchell released The Green Jacket Killer, a documentary on the crime.

== Aftermath ==
On January 12, 2001, Van de Velde sued Quinnipiac University for wrongfully dismissing him from a graduate program he was enrolled in there. Van de Velde agreed to drop the lawsuit on January 26, 2004, in exchange for $80,000.

On December 7, 2001, Van de Velde sued the NHPD in federal court in Connecticut claiming they violated his civil rights by naming only him publicly as a suspect while claiming that other suspects existed as well. Van de Velde added Yale as a defendant on April 15, 2003. U.S. District Judge Robert N. Chatigny dismissed the federal claims with prejudice and the state law claims without prejudice on March 15, 2004. Van de Velde asked Chatigny to reconsider in May 2006, resulting in the judge reinstating both the state and federal claims on December 11, 2007. On June 3, 2013, New Haven and Yale agreed to a monetary settlement with Van de Velde. State's Attorney Michael Dearington admitted publicly for the first time that Van de Velde is no longer a suspect in the murder.

A true crime series about the crime, Edgehill, was in development at the cable channel Esquire Network in 2017, but never commenced any planning or filming as the network shut down several months later.

== See also ==
- List of unsolved murders (1980–1999)
