= Built (TV series) =

American reality television series

- Genre: Reality
- Country of origin: United States
- No. of seasons: 1
- No. of episodes: 9

Production
- Executive producers: Karen Kunkel Young; Merah Chung; Sarah Weidman
- Running time: 40 to 42 minutes
- Production company: Endemol USA

Original release
- Network: Style Network
- Release: January 28, 2013 – 2013

Built is an American reality television series on the Style Network that premiered on January 28, 2013. Built follows a Manhattan-based home decor and construction company that is staffed with all male models who also have experience as being handymen.

== Cast ==
- Shane Duffy
- Sandy Dias
- Gage Cass
- Donny Ware
- Mike Keute
- Kim Gieske: Gieske works with the team to make sure everything goes as planned.

== Episodes ==
No.	Title	Original release date
1	"My Closet Needs to Be Boom Boom Pow"	January 28, 2013
The crew constructs a rich woman's attic into the closet of her dreams. Mike is working on staying fit for an upcoming underwear modeling job.
2	"This is Not the Goddess of Harlem"	February 5, 2013
The crew updates a former models apartment in Harlem. Gage chooses to return into the world of modeling.
3	"How Do We Work With a Swamp?"	February 5, 2013
A backyard is renovated into an outdoor man cave. Donny decides to pursue a modeling career.
4	"It's a Borderline Hoarder Situation"	N/A
5	"The Den of Sex You Desire"	N/A
6	"I Want Marrakech, But With A TV"	July 5, 2013(?)
7	"Ghana, Tibet, and India Barfed On Our Wall"	July 22, 2013(?)
