= Jerseylicious =

- Genre: Reality television
- Starring: Olivia Sharpe; Alexa Prisco; Tracy "Dimarco" Maloney; Gigi Liscio; Anthony Lombardi; Gayle Giacomo; Christy Pereira
- Country of origin: United States
- Original language: English
- No. of seasons: 6
- No. of episodes: 112

Production
- Executive producers: Alex Duda; Anthony Dominici
- Running time: 40–43 minutes
- Production company: Endemol USA

Original release
- Network: Style Network
- Release: March 21, 2010 – June 18, 2017

Related
- Chicagolicious; Glam Fairy

Jerseylicious is an American reality television show that premiered on March 21, 2010, on the now defunct Style Network. It chronicles the lives of six stylists who work at salons located in Green Brook Township, New Jersey. The Gatsby Salon, where the series is based upon, relaunched with a multimillion-dollar renovation and began hiring new employees in 2009, which included two of the main cast members: Tracy "Dimarco" Maloney and Olivia Blois Sharpe. Reruns of the series also air on Food Network (by Discovery Inc.).

The series was scheduled to return for its sixth season on October 6, 2013. However, it was announced that the Esquire Network would be taking over the Style Network rather than G4 as originally planned. The season later aired in countries where the Style Network still exists. Season 6 encompasses Olivia Blois Sharpe and Michelle DeCarlo as they pack their things and rent a summer house in Asbury Park, New Jersey. Tracy's wedding is also included. The show has now ended with Style Network being discontinued.

On August 26, 2014, Tracy "Dimarco" Maloney announced on her social networks that she was filming something for E! that was believed to be a spin-off show but ended up being for an E! True Hollywood Story special titled "Life After Reality" where she discussed her life now that Jerseylicious has ended.

== Cast ==
=== Main ===
- Tracy "Dimarco" Maloney: Former employee at The Gatsby Salon, The Glam Fairy, and Anthony Robert Salon
- Olivia Blois Sharpe: Makeup artist. Former employee at Anthony Robert Salon, The Gatsby Salon and The Glam Fairy who eventually works on her own.
- Gigi Liscio: Hairstylist at The Gatsby Salon
- Christy Pereira: Manager of The Gatsby Salon. Gayle Giacomo's daughter.
- Gayle Giacomo: Owner of The Gatsby Salon
- Alexa Prisco: Former lead makeup artist at The Gatsby Salon, owner of The Glam Fairy. Married to Danny. Alexa was given her own spinoff, Glam Fairy. She gave birth to their first child, McKayla in December 2012.
- Anthony Lombardi: Owner of Anthony Robert Salon in New Jersey. Author of The Glamour State.

=== Recurring ===
- Briella Calafiore: Hairdresser at Glam Fairy
- Frankie Buglione Jr.: Gigi's ex-boyfriend
- Filippo Giove Jr.: Former manager at the Anthony Robert Salon. Former Gatsby intern and assistant.
- Lorenzo Gangala (seasons 1–3): Gangala was never seen again on the series after his October 2011 arrest for assault. (Gangala died at the age of 38 on January 16, 2025, from reasons unknown.)
- Jaclyn "Jackie" Bianchi (seasons 2–6): Olivia's childhood friend and stylist at Anthony Robert Salon
- Doria Pagnotta (seasons 2–4): Makeup artist at The Gatsby Salon
- Mike Aktari (seasons 2–4): Olivia's and Tracy's ex-boyfriend. (Aktari died at the age of 28 on March 13, 2017, from reasons unknown.)
- Michelle DeCarlo (seasons 3–6): Hairstylist at The Gatsby Salon
- Catherine "Cathy" Giove (seasons 3–6): Former co-owner of the Anthony Robert Salon. Filippo's mother.
- Miguel Allure Rodriguez (seasons 3–6): Assistant stylist at The Gatsby Salon
- Krystle Couso (seasons 3–4)
- Corey Epstein (seasons 4–6): Tracy's Husband
- Anthony Tango (seasons 4–5)
- Nick Alleva (seasons 5–6): Olivia's boyfriend

== Episodes ==
=== Series overview ===
Season	Episodes	Originally released	
Season	Episodes	First released	Last released
1	8	March 21, 2010	May 9, 2010
2	20	September 5, 2010	January 30, 2011
3	20	May 15, 2011	October 16, 2011
4	24	February 19, 2012	July 29, 2012
5	17	January 28, 2013	May 26, 2013
6	10	June 18, 2017	

=== Season 1 (2010) ===
No. overall	No. in season	Title	Original release date
1	1	"Jersey Style Invasion"	March 21, 2010
The Gatsby Salon undergoes a multimillion-dollar renovation and conducts interviews for new staff.
2	2	"Pain Is Beauty"	March 28, 2010
The stylists settle into their new home, but the clash of personalities leads to tension in the workplace.
3	3	"Jersey Video Vixens"	April 4, 2010
The Gatsby teams up to shoot a commercial for the recently opened salon. Frankie plans a special surprise for Gigi on their vacation. Alexa invites Olivia to a Glam Fairy photo shoot to test her skills.
4	4	"Jersey Girl Brawl"	April 11, 2010
The Gatsby is entered into a statewide contest to find the best salon in New Jersey, and the workers try to keep to their best behavior while being judged.
5	5	"I Don't Wanna Lose My Nails"	April 18, 2010
Olivia and Tracy, accompanied by Gayle, learn at Warren Tricomi Salon in New York City.
6	6	"What Would Alexa Date?"	April 25, 2010
Olivia and Alexa work on a wedding and go on a double date together.
7	7	"Getting Sauced in Jersey"	May 2, 2010
Tracy and Olivia organize a charity event at the salon.
8	8	"Cover Catastrophe?"	May 9, 2010
The salon is a finalist to be featured on the cover of a local beauty magazine, with the winner being selected by how well a model is styled at the salon.

=== Season 2 (2010–11) ===
No. overall	No. in season	Title	Original release date
9	1	"Bronzer, Babies and Break-Ups"	September 5, 2010
Gayle feels the loss of Alexa and Olivia. Alexa helps Christy feel pretty again.
10	2	"Jersey Boss"	September 12, 2010
With maternity leave on the horizon, Christy wants to identify her replacement as soon as possible.
11	3	"Baby Mama, Baby Drama"	September 19, 2010
Gigi is going baby crazy and decides to throw Christy a surprise baby shower.
12	4	"Shore 'Nuff!"	September 26, 2010
Gigi and Frankie are on a break and Tracy has the perfect solution for her friend.
13	5	"Boobs Are the New Black"	October 3, 2010
The Gatsby staff butt heads over the new dress code.
14	6	"Party Psycho"	October 10, 2010
Gayle and Christy plan a mother–daughter event with a new party planner. Gigi sees a psychic and Anthony's salon is almost opened.
15	7	"Oh No She Didn't!"	October 17, 2010
Tracy, Gigi and Alexa go speed dating, while Olivia dates Tracy's former boyfriend Mikey, leading to a brawl between the two.
16	8	"Texcessive"	October 24, 2010
The girls attend a wedding in Texas, much to Gayle's dismay.
17	9	"Frankie Loves Gigi"	October 31, 2010
Anthony begins his reign as interim manager, but a risky move puts Gayle on edge.
18	10	"Business, Babies and Boob Jobs"	November 7, 2010
Gayle and Alexa's rocky partnership gets put to the test at a volunteer event. Olivia's dream of a boob job may come true. Christy's pregnancy comes to a critical crossroads.
19	11	"Glam Fairy Fallout"	November 21, 2010
Alexa tries to expand her business with a Bollywood-inspired photo shoot and a music video. Meanwhile, Gayle fears her partnership with Alexa is crumbling so she searches for a replacement.
20	12	"She'll Cut You"	November 28, 2010
A salon sales drive pits Tracy and Olivia in a battle for the top sales spot. Anthony celebrates his fifth wedding anniversary. Alexa's plans for her Glam Factory run into trouble.
21	13	"War on the Gatsby Floor"	December 5, 2010
Alexa and Gayle face off at the Gatsby and Olivia must choose sides; an unwelcome guest threatens to ruin Briella's birthday party. Frankie plans a special night with marriage on her mind.
22	14	"Gaga for Glam"	December 12, 2010
Olivia holds her first make-up event at the Gatsby while Alexa tries to take Glam Fairy viral.
23	15	"Date Night"	December 19, 2010
The Gatsby and Glam Fairy compete for a special event, while Christy and Danny have a babysitter for their first night out after having a baby.
24	16	"Gigi Gets Sexed-Up"	January 2, 2011
The Gatsby has a new addition, much to Olivia's dismay. Tracy strives to get into the tents for Fashion Week. Gigi celebrates her birthday showing a new side of herself.
25	17	"Here Comes Trouble"	January 9, 2011
Doria is staking her claim at the Gatsby, while Olivia is trying to prove herself to Gayle. Anthony discovers Lorenzo's hairstyling knowledge.
26	18	"Job Woes and Poconos"	January 16, 2011
Olivia is put on mandatory vacation at Gatsby & goes to Anthony for help. Tracy and Briella bond on a weekend trip to the Poconos. Frankie is confused about who Gigi is becoming.
27	19	"Gatsby Takes on Glammy"	January 23, 2011
The ladies of the Gatsby compete for a coveted position in New Jersey Fashion Week against Anthony Robert Salon and the Glam Fairy. Gigi and Frankie attempt to make Sunday dinner.
28	20	"The Final Showdown"	January 30, 2011
The competition continues between Gatsby, Glam Fairy and Anthony Roberts as they fight for the crystal trophy. Tracy finds a new love interest and Olivia re-ignites an old flame.
29	–	"Inside the Jungle"	February 20, 2011
A look inside the lives of the people from that Jerseylicious Garden State.

=== Season 3 (2011) ===
No. overall	No. in season	Title	Original release date
30	300A	"Wild and Untamed: Part 1"	May 8, 2011
The cast reunites to discuss the season, which opens old wounds.
31	300B	"Wild and Untamed: Part 2"	May 15, 2011
The cast reunites to discuss the season, which opens old wounds.
32	1	"Gatsby Global Domination"	May 15, 2011
The Gatsby attempts to get into the Guinness Book of World Records. Olivia rekindles her relationship with her ex. Gigi adjusts to single hood.
33	2	"A Jersey Little Secret"	May 22, 2011
The Gatsby offers Medispa service; Olivia tries to follow "The Secret"; Filly and Lorenzo apply to beauty school.
34	3	"A Bridal Fair Fight"	May 29, 2011
The Gatsby storms the Wildwoods Bridal Fair, but Alexa vows revenge on Gayle; a fight puts Tracy and Gigi at odds.
35	4	"Bad Boys Break Hearts"	June 5, 2011
A party at the Gatsby embracing plus-sized full-figured women forces Doria to face her demons; an encounter between Tracy and Mikey at a club leads to an explosive confrontation.
36	5	"Jersey Not-So Sweet Sixteen"	June 12, 2011
The Gatsby follows through on Olivia's idea to turn the salon into a mobile service, starting with a girl's Sweet 16; Filly helps the stylists get in shape with a boot camp; Olivia becomes Thomas' muse.
37	6	"Glam Slam"	June 19, 2011
Gayle steps on Alexa's toes; Lorenzo is ready for his first salon job, but has to prove himself; Gigi says goodbye to Carla.
38	7	"Single Moms Gone Wild"	July 3, 2011
Gatsby To Go has the first on-site event; Anthony finds ways to expand the business; Gigi moves on emotionally and physically.
39	8	"Interfriendtion"	July 10, 2011
Gigi moves into a new apartment, Gayle and Anthony spy on a new business while Olivia brings a much despised business into Anthony Roberts Salon.
40	9	"Jersey-Vicious"	July 17, 2011
Gatsby-to-Go offers 15-minute makeovers. Gayle and Gigi attend a Millionaire Matchmaker Mixer, while Tracy and Olivia have a run in at a club that will change things forever.
41	10	"Gatsby Goes Live"	July 24, 2011
Gayle realizes she needs some camera help. Alexa calls on Olivia for a favor. Anthony hosts a special guys night.
42	11	"Heads Will Roll"	July 31, 2011
Tracy is competing in a Multicultural Hair Show. Olivia makes a shocking confession. Alexa launches a new service.
43	12	"The Business of Betrayal"	August 7, 2011
Tracy and Olivia search for an assistant to help them on Gatsby to Go; an old friendship reignites, and Anthony gets upsetting news.
44	13	"Beauty Pageant Blowout"	August 14, 2011
Tracy and Olivia battle in a senior beauty pageant; Alexa tries to make a family portrait for Frankie; Anthony goes fishing.
45	14	"Who's Jealous Now?"	August 21, 2011
Tracy pursues an internship at a magazine; Olivia's forced to run a Gatsby 2 Go event on her own; Gigi and Frankie's relationship changes forever.
46	15	"Kelly Ripa Does Jersey"	August 28, 2011
Kelly Ripa's visit to the Gatsby causes conflict; Gigi struggles to be friends with Frankie; Filly and Mikey compete.
47	16	"Just Shoot Me"	September 4, 2011
Olivia and Tracy battle over conflicting photo shoots; Gigi's friendship with Frankie forces her to visit an unusual place.
48	17	"Friends with Benefits?"	September 18, 2011
A Gatsby stylist gets off to a rocky start with a co-worker; Frankie and Gigi re-define their friendship; Olivia teams up with an unlikely source to create a tutorial video.
49	18	"Cheers, I Hate You"	September 25, 2011
Gayle takes the Gatsby staff on a winery retreat; Miguel books his first Gatsby to Go client; Gigi is forced to make an important decision after a confrontation with Michelle.
50	19	"The Gatsby Takeover"	October 2, 2011
A plan to franchise the Gatsby brings Gayle a shocking offer; Gigi tries to make amends with Frankie; Olivia and Alexa makeover Anthony's salon.
51	20	"Garden State Goodbye"	October 16, 2011
Gayle debates selling the Gatsby; a surprising partner joins Anthony; Gigi and Frankie confront one another.

=== Season 4 (2012) ===
No. overall	No. in season	Title	Original release date
52	1	"You're Fired, Now What?"	February 19, 2012
The fourth season begins with Olivia agreeing to do hair to help out a thin Gatsby staff. Meanwhile, Gigi and Tracy deal with being fired.
53	2	"Mazel Tough"	February 26, 2012
Olivia gets overwhelmed running two events on her own; a stylist questions her career after a Glam Fairy photo shoot.
54	3	"Firing and Hiring"	March 4, 2012
Prospective stylists get a trial run at the Gatsby; Tracy and Gigi work part time for Anthony.
55	4	"A Gatsby Bra-Tacular"	March 11, 2012
Gayle holds a charity auction in the salon to battle bad press; Gigi and Frankie take their relationship to a new level; Anthony searches for help with soaring building costs.
56	5	"Surprise Stalker"	March 18, 2012
A large closet sale creates big drama; Christy's unwanted crush makes her cringe; Alexa and Danny debate their future together.
57	6	"Tracy's Big Test"	March 25, 2012
Tracy wants her old job back; Frankie moves in with Gigi; Anthony gets a new image.
58	7	"Knocked Up"	April 1, 2012
The Gatsby gang hijacks Gayle's product line upgrade; Tracy and Corey's romance is tested by a crisis; a staffer is pregnant.
59	8	"Catfight on the Catwalk"	April 8, 2012
Olivia and Tracy clash over ideas for a fashion show; Gigi and Frankie's therapy comes to a head; Anthony and Alexa battle over salon decor.
60	9	"Bye Bye Frankie"	April 15, 2012
Beauty rivals compete to take part in New York fashion workshops; Gigi seeks closure following her breakup; Olivia does her part for the environment.
61	10	"Born to Be Jerseylicious"	April 22, 2012
The stylists are profiled.
62	11	"Olivia's Beauty Betrayal"	April 29, 2012
Gayle flips when Olivia books the first-ever Anthony Robert's mobile event; Alexa questions her anti-marriage stance; Michelle struggles to ask out Tango.
63	12	"Friends and Family Fiasco"	May 6, 2012
Anthony tests out the new salon at Friends and Family Day; Olivia forces Gigi to date again; Gayle feels pressure now that Anthony's salon is open around the corner.
64	13	"Gayle's Big Secret"	May 13, 2012
Anthony attends the grand opening of his new salon; a secret turns Christy against Gayle; Olivia makes a workout video.
65	14	"Gatsy 2 Go Going Gone?"	May 20, 2012
Olivia and Tracy try to juggle Gayle's product line launch party and a billboard photo shoot at Anthony Robert without getting fired. Meanwhile, Alexa's dream engagement plan gets derailed.
66	15	"Girl Code"	June 3, 2012
Tracy and Olivia start a new Gatsby 2 Go service in image consulting; Gigi freaks out when Tracy has dinner at Frankie's house; Danny surprises Alexa.
67	16	"Un-Beweavable"	June 10, 2012
Olivia gets a new partner for a Gatsby 2 Go image makeover; Jon and Cathy get involved with Alexa's engagement party.
68	17	"Magazine Mayhem"	June 17, 2012
Gayle, Anthony and Alexa push to get featured in Modern Salon magazine; Tracy and Corey face unexpected hurdles; Filly chases his dream of becoming an underwear model.
69	18	"Bosom Buddies"	June 24, 2012
A fight threatens to derail a salon photo shoot; Gigi makes an unlikely friend; Christy, Jackie and Doria bond over motherhood.
70	19	"Solo-Livia"	July 8, 2012
A fight forces Olivia to question her future at the Gatsby; the staff at Anthony Robert Salon compete to win employee of the month; Anthony takes Corey under his wing
71	20	"Living in Sin"	July 15, 2012
Gayle plans an event to restore the Gatsby's name; Olivia teams up with Briella for a secret side job; Tracy and Corey hit a bump in their relationship.
72	21	"Blast From Jersey Past"	July 22, 2012
Cast members' pasts are explored.
73	22	"Battle of Beauty"	July 29, 2012
Anthony Robert Salon, the Glam Fairy and Olivia battle each other to win the Gatsby's Gallery of Beauty event. Corey tries to propose to Tracy.
74	23	"Reunion Show: Part 1"	August 19, 2012
75	24	"Reunion Show: Part 2"	August 26, 2012

=== Season 5 (2013) ===
No. overall	No. in season	Title	Original release date
76	1	"Liar Liar, Gigi's On Fire!"	January 28, 2013
The fifth season begins with the stylists planning a casino-themed party to celebrate Anthony's 40th birthday. Tracy takes her bridesmaids dress shopping and Olivia feuds with Gigi.
77	2	"The Naked Truth"	February 4, 2013
Anthony asks Olivia to be a guest make-up artist at an event; Gigi confronts Tracy about her wedding.
78	3	"Two's Company, Gigi's A Crowd"	February 11, 2013
Tracy seeks guidance from an unlikely source; Jackie sets Olivia up with her cousin; Anthony and Cathy have a disagreement over an upgrade.
79	4	"Two Faced to Face"	February 18, 2013
Anthony tries to get a book published; Gayle considers getting a face-lift; Gigi brawls with Tracy.
80	5	"Behind Frenemy Lines"	February 25, 2013
Gigi has her three-way talk with Olivia and Tracy.
81	6	"Ex, Lies, And Videotape"	March 3, 2013
82	7	"Do or Dye"	March 10, 2013
83	8	"Filly's Full Monty"	March 17, 2013
84	9	"What a Tease"	March 24, 2013
85	10	"Love Inks"	March 31, 2013
86	11	"Surviving Sandy"	April 14, 2013
87	12	"Desperately Seeking Frankie"	April 21, 2013
88	13	"#Notsorry"	April 28, 2013
89	14	"There's No Place Like Jersey?"	May 5, 2013
90	15	"The Reunion Show (Part 1)"	May 12, 2013
91	16	"The Reunion Show (Part 2)"	May 19, 2013
92	17	"Jrz: Jerseylicious Exposed!"	June 2, 2013

=== Season 6 (2017) ===
Season 6 was not released on television after Style Network relaunched as Esquire Network. On June 18, 2017, Season 6 was made available on E! On Demand in the United States, UK and Europe.

No. overall	No. in season	Title	Original release date
93	1	"Beaches and Bs"	June 18, 2017
94	2	"Shore House Showdown"	June 18, 2017
95	3	"Shore Shame Redemption"	June 18, 2017
96	4	"Birthday Bash, Friendship Smash"	June 18, 2017
97	5	"Paired Up and Pissed Off"	June 18, 2017
98	6	"Jersey Rules Of Engagement"	June 18, 2017
99	7	"The Rubdown Heard Round Jersey"	June 18, 2017
100	8	"Righting Wrongs and Wronging Rights"	June 18, 2017
101	9	"A Very Jersey Wedding"	June 18, 2017
102	10	"Still Not Sorry"	June 18, 2017

== Ratings ==
The series' premiere episode gained 300,000 total viewers and posted a 0.42 rating within the women 18-to-34 demographic. The season two finale rose to 925,000 viewers, the most-watched season-ender to-date of any series on the Style Network. The third season debut episode averaged 665,000 viewers. Season 4 premiered with a total of 668,000 viewers. 460,000 viewers watched the Season 5 finale.

== Criticism of stereotypes ==
Jerseylicious has been criticized by the Italian American ONE VOICE Coalition for its portrayals of crude 'Jersey Shore' stereotypes about Italian Americans. According to the ONE VOICE website, Jerseylicious and other related programs including Jersey Shore, The Real Housewives of New Jersey, Mob Wives, My Big Friggin' Wedding, Carfellows and Married a Mobster "have replaced fictitious characters with real low lifes, buffoons, carfoni and bimbos in the proliferation of reality shows" and turned anti-Italianism into "a global business."

== International broadcasts ==
Seasons 1-3 of the show aired on the Slovak TV WAU. In the United Kingdom, the show aired on ITVBe. Reruns of the show air also on E!.
