= Esquire Network =

Former American pay television network

- Country: United States
- Broadcast area: Nationwide
- Headquarters: Los Angeles, California

Programming
- Language: English

Ownership
- Owner: NBCUniversal Cable Entertainment Group (50%); Hearst Communications (50%)

History
- Launched: October 1, 1998; 28 years ago
- Closed: June 28, 2017; 9 years ago
- Former names: Style Network (1998–2013)

Esquire Network was an American pay television network owned as a 50/50 joint venture between NBCUniversal and the Hearst Corporation. Launched on October 1, 1998 as Style Network, a spin-off of E!, the channel initially consisted of fashion, design, and urban lifestyle-themed programming. In 2008, Style shifted its programming towards personality-centric reality shows. The network was relaunched as Esquire Network on September 23, 2013; the rebrand was supposed to take place on G4, but was instead moved to Style due to G4's low ratings. As Esquire Network, the channel focused on travel, cooking, sports and fashion, and also aired reruns of sitcoms and dramas.

Due to low ratings and subsequent carriage decline by cable providers, Esquire Network closed as a cable channel on June 28, 2017, with an original intention to shift the brand exclusively online soon abandoned.

== History ==
=== Style Network ===
Style Network's logo from its 1998 debut until 2012

The channel was originally launched as Style Network (although on-air promotions typically referred to it as simply "Style") on October 1, 1998, serving as a spin-off of E!. It was intended to leverage E!'s coverage of fashion and to provide an expanded venue for shows such as Fashion Emergency. The network focused on fashion, design, interior decoration and urban lifestyle-related programming. Style provided coverage of events like New York Fashion Week and showcased various designers. Early programming included: The Look for Less, Shabby Chic with Rachel Ashwell, Glow: The Beauty Show, Vogue Takes..., Stylemaker, Model, Runway, Dining with Style, and Homes with Style. Around 2003, the channel began airing a variety of "makeover" shows, including the home makeover show Clean House, which lasted for ten seasons on the network, and a face makeover show How Do I Look?, which lasted for eight seasons.

Style Network logo used from 2012 to 2013 in the United States; used by most local versions in international markets

Starting in 2008, Style shifted its focus to personality-based reality programing such as Jerseylicious, Tia & Tamera, and Big Rich Texas, along with a female-focused spin-off of The Soup known as The Dish. On June 25, 2012, Style Network was rebranded with a revised logo and a new slogan: "Work it. Love it. Style it." In 2013, the channel launched two real estate related shows: Hot Listings: Miami and Built, which featured male models remodeling houses.

=== Relaunch as Esquire Network ===
In December 2012, NBCUniversal signed a brand licensing deal with the Hearst Corporation, owner of Esquire magazine, to relaunch G4 into Esquire Network, which would air shows aimed at a metrosexual audience with non-sports related male-targeted programming about travel, cooking, and fashion, alongside acquired and archived programming from the NBCUniversal library including Party Down, Parks and Recreation and week-delayed episodes of Late Night with Jimmy Fallon.

The rebranding was scheduled to take place on April 22, 2013, but was moved to an unspecified date in the summer on April 15, 2013, as network general manager Adam Stotsky stated the rebranding was pushed back in order to have a broader slate of original series to launch than would have been available for the April launch. In May 2013, the launch date was pushed to September 23, 2013, with its first program being an 80th anniversary special on Esquire which was rebroadcast later in primetime.

On September 9, 2013, NBCUniversal announced that it would replace Style Network with Esquire Network, leaving G4 "as is for the foreseeable future, though it's highly unlikely the company will invest in more original programming" according to The Hollywood Reporter. One of the factors was likely Style's distribution on certain pay TV providers, including DirecTV, giving Esquire more homes at launch with the Style channel slot than they would have had with G4 (G4 had earlier been removed by DirecTV in 2010 due to the channel's low viewership and had never been able to come to terms on a new carriage agreement).

This forced last-second changes to Esquire Network's planned schedule outside of primetime. Cable-edited reruns of Sex and the City (a series which took heavy criticism from Esquire magazine during its original run) remained on its schedule until December 2013 (when the rights were shifted to E!), with most of Style's series being canceled or transferred to E!, Bravo and Oxygen. International versions of Style Network continued to exist several years after, as the Esquire brand license was restricted solely to the United States. The original iteration of G4 closed on December 31, 2014.

The sudden change in networks surprised both viewers and providers, who had already shifted or expected the G4 channel space to a more appropriate place among other men's networks, and now had to deal with moving Esquire's channel position from the women's networks in their lineups, along with having to answer customer inquiries about Style Network suddenly being replaced and its programming. Personalities that were featured on Style's programming, including Tia and Tamera Mowry, reacted angrily to seeing their projects cancelled without notice or be shifted among other networks with different programming priorities, and NBCUniversal would have to deal with the repercussions of the rebrand with only two weeks' notice.

Style made no mention of the oncoming rebranding until September 18, when a 60-second farewell clip was posted on its YouTube channel serving as a retrospective of the network's history and ending with a thanks to the channel's audience for their viewership. Other social media platforms for individual Style programs also began to mention the network's closure on that day. The last program to air on Style on September 22, 2013, was an overnight repeat of the Tia & Tamera season finale episode "Twerkin' 9 to 5" (which became its de facto series finale as Tia and Tamera Mowry opted to cancel the series after the relaunch) at 2 a.m. Eastern Time, with the nightly three-hour paid programming block leading into the Esquire Network launch special after a 30-second abbreviated version of the Style farewell clip aired on the channel space. The rebranding occurred on September 23, 2013, at 6 a.m. Eastern Time.

=== Decline and carriage disputes ===
Throughout 2015 and 2016, the majority of the original programs produced for Esquire Network were canceled due to low ratings, with only the youth football reality series Friday Night Tykes and the network's Men in Blazers–produced live broadcasts of Pamplona's Running of the Bulls receiving any critical acclaim or notice. The rest of its lineup was criticized for depending on derivative and "copycat" formats of better programming, which was often found on other networks or produced for free consumption independently and uploaded to streaming video providers such as YouTube and Vimeo. After only several months, the network discontinued airing repeats of Late Night after then-host Jimmy Fallon moved to The Tonight Show in February 2014, which NBC refused to air repeats of on cable television.

American Ninja Warrior, which first premiered on G4, was expected to be on Esquire Network's original lineup, with its fifth season scheduled to premiere in summer 2013 on the network, but with the delay of the network's launch to September 2013, NBCUniversal opted not to wait until then for the season premiere, and the program had success airing on NBC during the summer as repeats in previous seasons. The show's sixth season, which had been taped expecting to air as part of Esquire Network and visually featured its logo in prominent places, then moved to NBC for the 2014 summer season, and airing as a new season on the broadcast network, which had high ratings and subsequent popularity. NBCUniversal decided to move the series permanently to NBC, leaving Esquire Network with repeats rather than to air new episodes, and even before its launch, removing one of the network's G4-era critical series from being used to promote its other content.

Although it did receive a spin-off as consolation, Team Ninja Warrior, Esquire Network had no other compatible programming to promote it, and it never broke into the top 100 cable shows in any of its first season airings. It was moved to USA Network for its second season and beyond.

Press attention for the network's programming soon was limited to network promotions of their premieres, then to their eventual notice of cancellation, including little to no promotion from Esquire magazine itself due to a lack of compatible promotion. The magazine, which under the brand licensing deal was expected to be used to source new series ideas or its writers participating in factual programming such as countdowns, was also severely underutilized, with most of the content developed for the network ending up being from traditional talent pipelines used by NBCUniversal, rather than the magazine itself.

Due to these multiple issues, the network began to carry more repeats of existing library comedy and drama series (many of which were seen over-the-air for free on sister networks Cozi TV, LXTV, and NBC's streaming apps, along with other NBCU networks), which again brought the network towards the same issues as other defunct NBCU channels including G4, Chiller, and Cloo, where little original content being produced made it a network viewers and providers claimed provided little value for its monthly carriage fees.

On October 1, 2016, Dish Network removed the channel from the lineup, alongside the removal of Cloo several months earlier, the provider stated that most of the network's rerun-centric programming was duplicative of that available on other networks and streaming services. The only notice of the removal was through the provider's monthly billing statement. AT&T then gave notice that Esquire Network would be removed from U-verse and DirecTV on December 15, 2016, a move that cut the network's availability by 25% and removed almost all consumer-based satellite service availability outside of niche C-Band consumers. Charter Communications through its Time Warner Cable, Bright House Networks and Spectrum subsidiaries removed the channel from their lineup nationwide on April 25, 2017 (the same day they removed Chiller from their lineup, also nationwide), leaving Verizon FiOS and Google Fiber as some of the last cable providers to carry Esquire Network until its closure; online access to the network's TV Everywhere live feed was maintained by Charter until the network's shutdown.

=== Closure ===
On January 18, 2017, it was announced that the network would close on all pay television distributions in mid-2017 and convert to an online-only model. The network shut down on June 28 at noon Eastern time. The network aired a marathon of Friday Night Tykes on the day of its closure, with the season one finale, "Finish What We Started", being its final program. After the episode ended, a "thank you" slide was shown with the network's web address (which shortly thereafter was turned into a redirect to the main Esquire website). No further comment was made in regards to the supposed online-only version of the network, and Esquire's "TV" section on their website now contains the general features and behind-the-scenes footage prevalent on most magazine sites. The network's final two projects, Edgehill (a true crime series about the Murder of Suzanne Jovin) and Borderland USA (a reality series about the U.S. Border Patrol Tactical Unit) were promised to air on the new digital version of the network, but have since been abandoned.

G4's Canadian network closed on August 31, 2017, two months after than Esquire shut down. G4 would relaunch in the United States in a new hybrid cable-digital form on November 16, 2021, after a year of lead-up promotions and announcements, though it closed on November 18, 2022.

Hearst has since re-established Esquire-branded programming through the stations of Hearst Television and its streaming network Very Local beginning in 2021, with In Transit, a tourism travelogue series hosted by Dave Holmes.

== International ==
Internationally, Style Network was launched in the Arab world in December 2007 on Showtime Arabia, across Southern and Western Africa during back in November 2007 on DStv, in the United Kingdom and Ireland on June 10, 2008, in Japan on World on Demand, Australia in November 2009, and Poland in August 2011. The network was also launched in CEE, from February 19, 2011, until May 1, 2014

Style Network continues to air in international markets, though its British/Irish version closed on December 9, 2013, while its African version closed on March 31, 2015. The brand licensing agreement with Hearst for Esquire Network was exclusive to the United States, and NBCU and Hearst never pursued any international versions for Esquire Network.

In 2014, the Australian version of the Style Network made its first local commission, Fashion Bloggers, after its American counterpart rebranded. Style Australia shut down on 17 December 2019 as part of a restructuring of NBCU's Australian operations and a broad re-map of Foxtel's channel lineup.
