= Laredo metropolitan area =

Laredo Metropolitan Area
- Metropolitan statistical area
- Laredo, TX Metropolitan Statistical Area
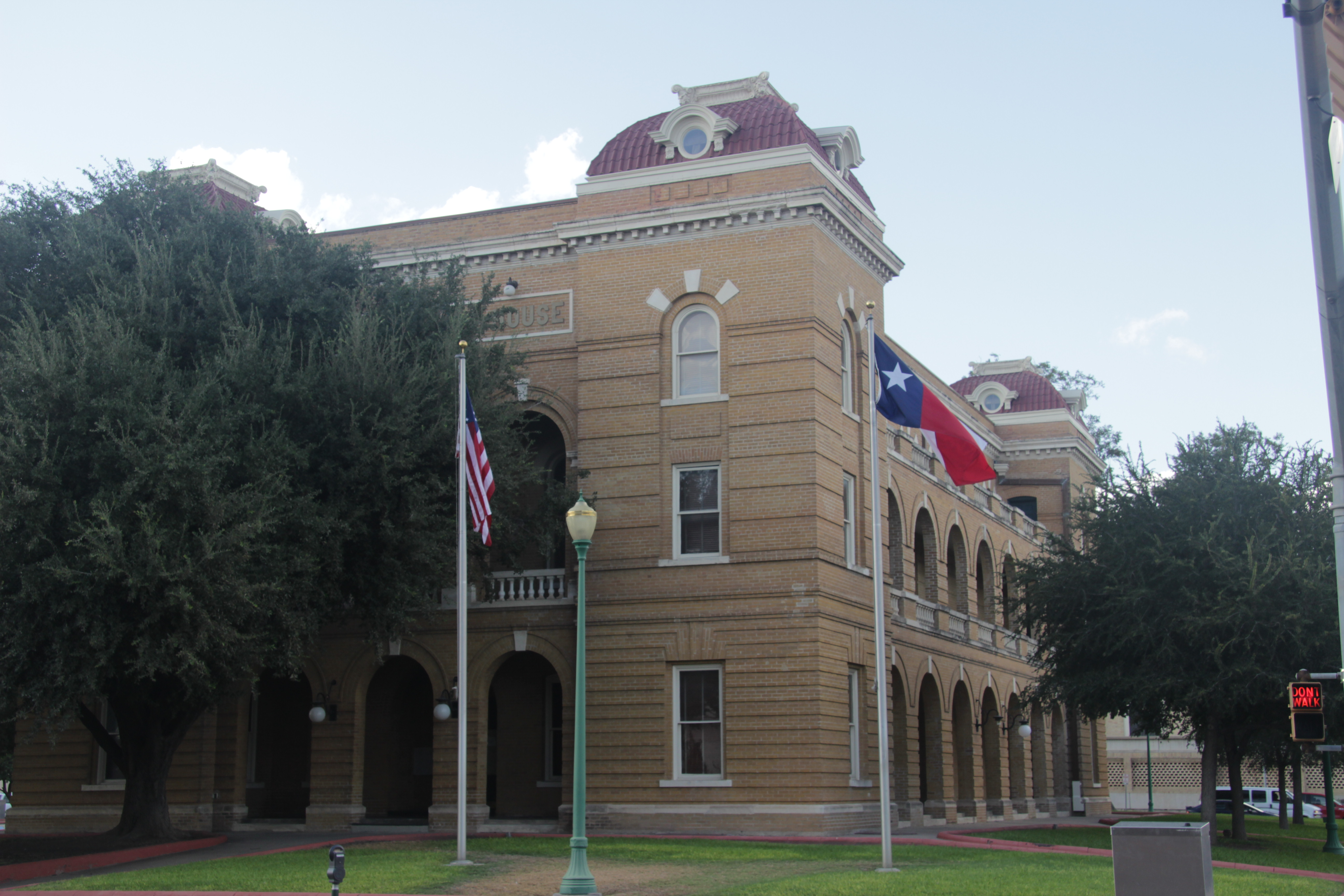
- Webb County Courthouse
Interactive Map of Laredo Metropolitan Area
City of Laredo
Laredo, TX MSA
- Location in the United States
- Country: United States
- State: Texas
- Principal cities: Laredo

Area
  - Metro: 3,376 sq mi (8,744 km^{2})

Population (2010)
  - Density: 75/sq mi (29/km^{2})
  - MSA: 250,304
- Time zone: UTC−6 (CST)
  - Summer (DST): UTC−5 (CDT)

The Laredo metropolitan area is the 178th-largest United States metropolitan area and covers all of Webb county, with a population of 250,304. It is also a part of the Laredo-Nuevo Laredo Metropolitan Area with an estimate population of 689,022 in 2020.

== Communities ==
=== Cities ===
- El Cenizo
- Laredo (county seat)
- Rio Bravo

=== Census-designated places ===
- Aguilares
- Bonanza Hills
- Botines
- Bruni
- Colorado Acres
- Four Points
- Hillside Acres
- La Coma
- La Moca Ranch Colonia
- La Presa
- Laredo Ranchettes
- Laredo Ranchettes West
- Larga Vista
- Las Haciendas
- Las Pilas
- Los Altos
- Los Arcos
- Los Centenarios
- Los Corralitos
- Los Fresnos
- Los Huisaches
- Los Minerales
- Los Nopalitos
- Los Veteranos I
- Los Veteranos II
- Mirando City
- Oilton
- Pueblo East
- Pueblo Nuevo
- Ranchitos East
- Ranchitos Las Lomas
- Ranchos Penitas West
- San Carlos I
- San Carlos II
- Sunset Acres
- Tanquecitos South Acres
- Tanquecitos South Acres II
- Valle Verde

=== Additional unincorporated communities ===
Source: Webb County Planning and Physical Development Department

- Antonio Santos Colonia
- Cactus
- Callaghan
- D-5 Acres Colonia
- Darwin
- Del Mar East
- Fort McIntosh
- Gate Acres Colonia
- Islitas
- Las Blancas Colonia
- Las Tiendas
- Los Ojuelos
- Minera
- Nye
- Old Milwaukee East
- Old Milwaukee West
- One River Place Colonia
- Orvil
- Palafox
- Pescadito
- Ranchitos los Mesquites Colonia
- Regency Village Colonia
- Rodriguez Addition Colonia
- San Pablo
- San Ramon
- Santo Tomás
- Village East Colonia
- Webb

== Geography ==
According to the U.S. Census Bureau, the county has a total area of 3,376 square miles (8,740 km^{2}), of which 3,361 square miles (8,700 km^{2}) is land and 14 square miles (36 km^{2}) (0.4%) is water.

== Major highways ==
- Interstate 35
- Interstate 69W (Under construction)
- U.S. Highway 59
- U.S. Highway 83
- State Highway 44
- State Highway 255
- State Highway 359

== Demographics ==
Historical population
Census	Pop.	Note	%±
1860	1,397		—
1870	2,615		87.2%
1880	5,273		101.6%
1890	14,842		181.5%
1900	21,851		47.2%
1910	22,503		3.0%
1920	29,152		29.5%
1930	42,128		44.5%
1940	45,916		9.0%
1950	56,141		22.3%
1960	64,791		15.4%
1970	72,859		12.5%
1980	99,258		36.2%
1990	133,239		34.2%
2000	193,117		44.9%
2010	250,304		29.6%
2014 (est.)	266,673		6.5%
U.S. Decennial Census; 1850–2010

As of the census of 2000, there were 193,117 people, 50,740 households, and 43,433 families residing in the county. The county gained 57,000 additional residents between 2000 and 2010. The population density was 58 people per square mile (22 people/km^{2}). There were 55,206 housing units at an average density of 16 per square mile (6.2/km^{2}). The racial makeup of the county was 82.16% White, 0.37% Black or African American, 0.47% Native American, 0.43% Asian, 0.02% Pacific Islander, 14.00% from other races, and 2.54% from two or more races. 94.28% of the population were Hispanic or Latino of any race.

There were 50,740 households, out of which 53.20% had children under the age of 18 living with them, 62.60% were married couples living together, 18.30% had a female householder with no husband present, and 14.40% were non-families. 12.40% of all households were made up of individuals, and 5.10% had someone living alone who was 65 years of age or older. The average household size was 3.75 and the average family size was 4.10.

In the county, the age distribution of the population shows 36.20% under the age of 18, 11.40% from 18 to 24, 29.30% from 25 to 44, 15.60% from 45 to 64, and 7.60% who were 65 years of age or older. The median age was 26 years. For every 100 females, there were 92.90 males. For every 100 females age 18 and over, there were 87.90 males.

The median income for a household in the county was $28,100, and the median income for a family was $29,394. Males had a median income of $23,618 versus $19,018 for females. The per capita income for the county was $10,759. About 26.70% of families and 31.20% of the population were below the poverty line, including 39.40% of those under age 18 and 26.90% of those age 65 or over.

== Laredo top employers ==
Employer	Category	Employees
United Independent School District	Education	6,179
Laredo Independent School District	Education	4,500
City of Laredo	Government	2,371
Laredo Sector Border Patrol	Immigration	2,000
H-E-B	Grocery	1,626
Webb County	Government	1,500
Laredo Medical Center	Health care	1,300
Texas A&M International University	Education	1,215
McDonald's	Food	1,200
Walmart	Retail	937
Convergys	Call Center	860
Doctors Hospital	Health Care	811
International Bank of Commerce	Financial Services	661
Stripes Convenience Stores	Retail/Convenience	337
Laredo Energy Arena	Entertainment	293
Securitas Security Services USA	Private Security	285

== Colleges and universities ==
Laredo is home to Laredo Community College and Texas A&M International University (TAMIU). The University of Texas Health Science Center at San Antonio has a campus in Laredo.

The Laredo Community College is a two-campus institution which offers two-year Associate's degrees. The main campus is located at the western end of downtown Laredo near the Rio Grande, on the site of the former Fort McIntosh. This fort played a major role in the development of Laredo, as it served to protect the community from Indian raids in its early history. Several of the old buildings at the fort were converted into classrooms, but after renovation programs nearly all of the campus structures are now modern. The smaller, newer second campus, Laredo Community College South Campus, is located in south Laredo along U. S. Route 83.

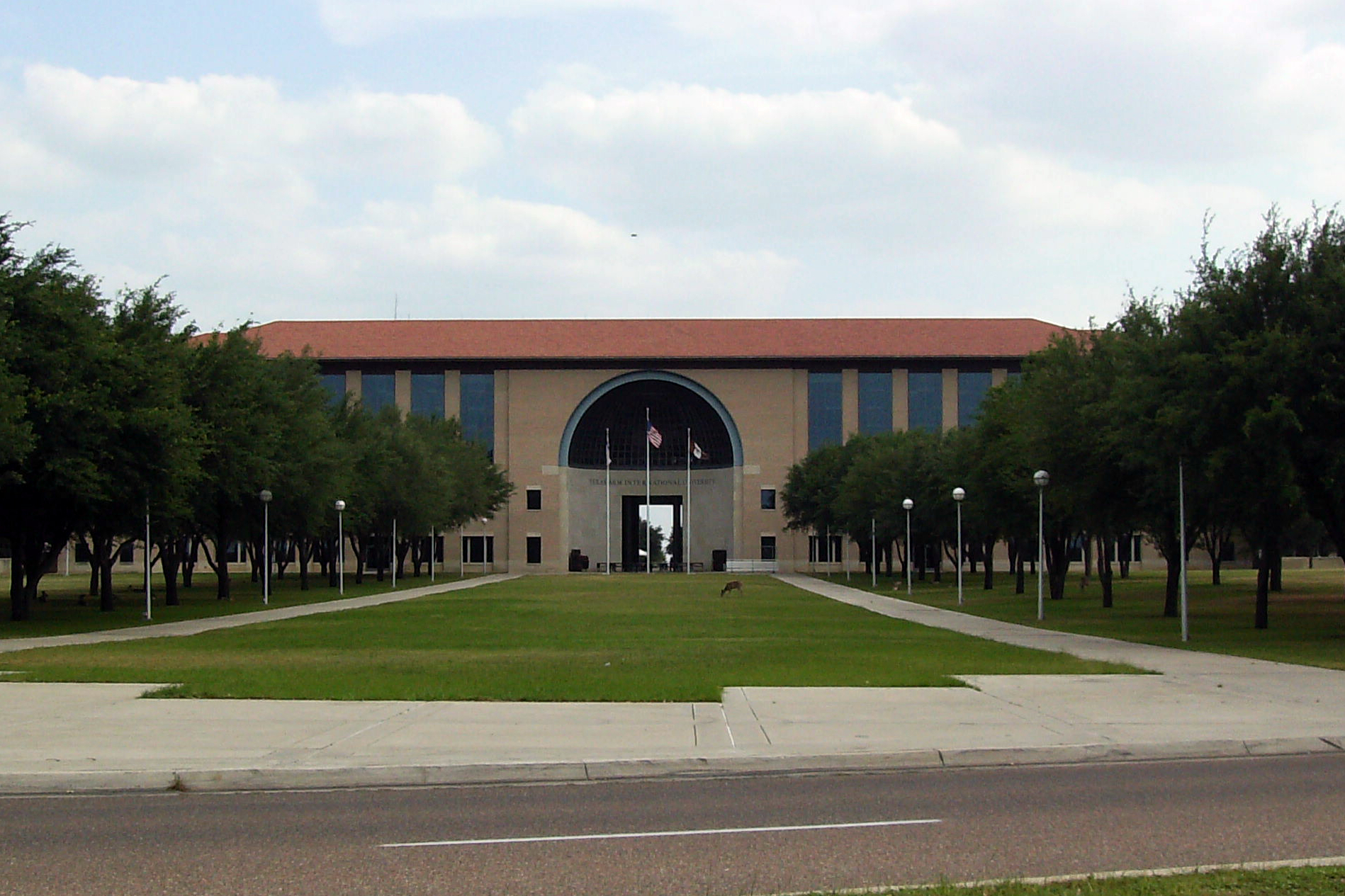
Texas A&M International University Library

The Texas A&M International University is a 4/6-year university that offers bachelor's and master's degrees. On April 22, 2004, the Texas Higher Education Coordinating Board in Austin, Texas provided its approval for Texas A&M International University to grant its first PhD in International Business Administration. TAMIU's College of Business Administration has been named an outstanding business school in The Princeton Review's "Best 282 Business Schools", 2007 Edition, and ranked third in the nation for the category: "Greatest Opportunity for Minority Students." The university's campus is located in Northeast Laredo along Loop 20. The university was once an extension of Texas A&I-Kingsville and later the former Laredo State University. Prior to its current location along Bob Bullock Loop 20, the university was housed with the Laredo Community College downtown campus.

The University of Texas Health Science Center campus is located in East Laredo near U.S. Highway 59 and the Laredo Medical Center. The campus is an extension university from UTHSC in San Antonio, Texas. The university offers doctoral degrees in the medical and dental fields.

== Media ==
=== Newspapers ===
Name	Frequency	Language	City	Website
Laredo Morning Times	Daily	English	Laredo	lmtonline.com
LareDOS	Monthly	English	Laredo	laredosnews.com
El Mañana	Daily	Spanish	Nuevo Laredo/Laredo	elmanana.com.mx
El Diario de Nuevo Laredo	Daily	Spanish	Nuevo Laredo	diario.net
Primera Hora	Daily	Spanish	Nuevo Laredo	primerahora.com
Última Hora	Daily	Spanish	Nuevo Laredo	ultimahora.com

=== Television ===
According to Nielsen Media Research, the Laredo region (which includes Webb and Zapata counties) is ranked 185th market by population size in the United States. The first station to broadcast in Laredo was KGNS in 1956, followed by KVTV in 1973, then KJTB (now KLDO) in 1985.

Notably television networks missing from Laredo's airwaves are PBS and The CW. Laredo once had a full-power local The CW affiliate, KGNS-DT2, but on July 3, 2014, the affiliation switched to ABC. Prior to that KJTB channel 27, from January 1985 to October 1988 was Laredo's ABC affiliate. KJTB was later bought by Entravision and affiliated the station to Telemundo and changed its callsign to KLDO. Today KLDO is affiliated to Univision. Before KJTB, KGNS, an NBC affiliate had a secondary affiliation to ABC from its founding in 1956 through KJTB's founding in 1985. On November 6, 2013, KGNS reached an agreement to add the ABC affiliation. The ABC affiliate was to have been launched in February 2014 on KGNS's subchannel 8.2. But it was not until July 2014 when KGNS dropped The CW programming and added ABC programming.

In December 2014, all Nuevo Laredo stations must turn off analog television broadcasting and broadcast only digitally.

CH	VC	DT	DTV	Dish	TWC	Callsign	Network	Resolution	City of license	Official website	Notes
2	2.1	17.1	•	•	99	XEFE	Televisa local	480i	Nuevo Laredo	•	Last station to broadcast in digital
•	8.1	8.1	8	8	10	KGNS	NBC	HD 1080i	Laredo	pro8news.com	•
•	8.2	8.2	•	15	9	KGNS-DT2	ABC	HD 720p	Laredo	kgns.tv	•
•	8.3	8.3	•	16	25	KGNS-DT3	Telemundo	SD 480i	Laredo	telemundo.com	•
•	•	•	•	•	11	KLRN	PBS	Analog	San Antonio	klrn.org	•
•	10.1^{CP}	10.1^{CP}	•	•	•	K10QK-D^{CP}	CarismaTV	SD 480i	Laredo	feypoder.com	Construction permit expires 7/2014
11	11.1	25.1	•	•	14	XHBR	Canal de las Estrellas	HD 1080i	Nuevo Laredo	televisa.com	•
•	13.20	51.2	•	•	•	XHLAT-TDT2	Dark	SD 480i	Nuevo Laredo	•	ID: FVDld
•	14.3	14.3	•	•	•	KYLX-LD	Testing	HD 1080i	Laredo	•	•
•	15.1	15.1	•	•	•	KLMV	BVB	SD 480i	Laredo	buenav.net	•
•	15.2	15.2	•	•	•	KLMV-LD2	Infomercials	SD 480i	Laredo	•	•
•	15.3	15.3	•	•	•	KLMV-LD3	Vida Vision	SD 480i	Laredo	buenav.net	•
•	15.4	15.4	•	•	•	KLMV-LD4	Televida Laredo	SD 480i	Laredo	buenav.net	•
•	19.3	19.3	•	•	•	KLDO-DT3	Dark	SD 480i	Laredo	•	•
21	21.1	50.1	•	•	98	XHLNA	Azteca 13	HD 1080i	Nuevo Laredo	tvazteca.com	•
•	21.2	50.2	•	•	•	XHLNA-TDT2	Proyecto 40	HD 1080i	Nuevo Laredo	proyecto40.com	•
•	27.1	19.1	27	27	78.1	KLDO	Univision	HD 1080i	Laredo	kldotv.com	•
•	27.2	19.2	•	•	•	KLDO-DT2	LATV	SD 480i	Laredo	latv.com	•
•	31.1	31.1	•	•	77	KXOF-CD	UniMás	SD 480i	Laredo	ketftv.com	•
•	31.2	31.2	39	39	2.2	KXOF-CD2	Fox / MyNet	HD 720p	Laredo	myfoxlaredo.com	•
33	33.1	51.1	•	•	•	XHLAT	Azteca 7	HD 1080i	Nuevo Laredo	tvazteca.com	•
•	39.1	27.3	39	39	2.2	KETF-CD	Fox	HD 720p	Laredo	mylaredofox.com	•
•	39.2	27.4	•	•	•	KETF-CD2	MundoMax	SD 480i	Laredo	mundofox.com	•
•	40.1^{CP}	40.1^{CP}	•	•	•	K40NU-D	Maranatha Church TV	SD 480i	Laredo	•	Construction permit expires 10/2016
45	45.1	32.1	•	•	15	XHNAT	Multimedios Plus	SD 480i	Nuevo Laredo	multimedios.tv	•
•	45.2	32.2	•	•	•	XHNAT-TDT2	Milenio TV	HD 1080i	Nuevo Laredo	milenio.tv	•
•	45.3	32.3	•	•	•	XHNAT-TDT3	Teleritmo	SD 480i	Nuevo Laredo	multimedios.tv	•
57	57.1	38.1	•	•	•	XHLAR	Televisa Regional	HD 1080i	Nuevo Laredo	televisa.com	•

^{CP}: Construction permit

=== Radio ===
According to Arbitron, the Laredo region (which includes Jim Hogg, Webb, and Zapata counties) is ranked 191st market by population size.

==== AM radio ====
Frequency	Callsign	Brand	City of License	Website	Webcast
530	WPMQ285	TxDOT HAR	Laredo	•	•
790	XEFE	La Mera Ley	Nuevo Laredo	•	listen live
890	KVOZ	Radio Cristiana	Laredo	lanuevaradiocristiana.com	•
960	XEK	La Grande	Nuevo Laredo	xek.com	listen live
1000	XENLT	Radio Formula	Nuevo Laredo	radioformula.com	listen live
1090	XEWL	La Romantica	Nuevo Laredo	radiorama.com	listen live
1300	KLAR	Radio Poder	Laredo	feypoder.com	listen live
1340	XEBK	Mega 95.7	Nuevo Laredo	radiorama.com	listen live
1370	XEGNK	Radio Mexicana	Nuevo Laredo	radiorama.com	listen live
1410	XEAS	Ke Buena	Nuevo Laredo	kebuena.com	listen live
1490	KLNT	Super Tejano	Laredo	klnt1490.com	listen live
1550	XENU	La Rancherita	Nuevo Laredo	radiorama.com	listen live
1610	WQA200	CBP Information	Laredo	•	•

==== FM radio ====
Frequency	Callsign	Brand	Format	City of License	Website	Webcast
88.1	KHOY	Catholic Radio	Religious	Laredo	khoy.org	listen live
88.9	XHLDO	Radio Tamaulipas	Public Radio	Nuevo Laredo	tamaulipas.gob	listen live
89.9	KBNL	Radio Manantial	Spanish religious	Laredo	kbnl.com	listen live
91.3	XHNOE	Stereo 91	Spanish Contemporary	Nuevo Laredo	xhnoe.com	listen live
92.7	KJBZ	Z93	Tejano	Laredo	z93laredo.com	listen live
93.7	"XHNLT"^{PR}	Radio Estereo Uncion FM	Christian Radio	Nuevo Laredo	uncionfeypoder.com	listen live
94.1	XHTLN	Imagen / RMX Laredo	Talk / Contemporary	Nuevo Laredo	rmx.com.mx	listen live
94.9	KQUR	Digital 94.9	Spanish Pop	Laredo	digital949.com	listen live
95.3	XHLPZ	La Traviesa	Spanish Regional	Lampazos	•	•
95.7	XHBK	Mega 95.7	Spanish Contemporary	Nuevo Laredo	radioavanzado.com	listen live
96.5	"XHTWO"^{PR}	Radio Two	Norteño	Nuevo Laredo	•	listen live
97.1	XHNLO	La Caliente	Norteño	Nuevo Laredo	mmradio.com	listen live
98.1	KRRG	Big Buck Country	Country	Laredo	bigbuck98.com	listen live
99.3	XHNK	40 Principales	Top 40	Nuevo Laredo	radiorama.com	listen live
100.5	KBDR	La Ley	Tejano	Laredo	laley1005.com	listen live
101.5	XHAS	Ke Buena	Norteño	Nuevo Laredo	kebuena.com	listen live
102.3	XHMW	Stereo Vida	AC/Oldies	Nuevo Laredo	radiorama.com	listen live
102.9	none^{PR}	La Guerrera de la Frontera	International	Nuevo Laredo	laguerrera.mx	listen live
103.3	none^{PR}	XRock	Classic rock	Nuevo Laredo	•	listen live
104.5	none^{PR}	2 Beat	Electronica	Nuevo Laredo	•	•
104.9	XHNLR	Radio UAT	University Radio	Nuevo Laredo	uat.mx	listen live
105.1	none^{PR}	RN Radio	Spanish	Nuevo Laredo	rn105.com	listen live
105.5	none^{PR}	Mas Musica	Spanish	Nuevo Laredo	•	•
106.1	KNEX	Hot 106.1	Urban / Rhythmic Top 40	Laredo	hot1061.com	listen live
106.5	none^{PR}	Radio Voz	Norteño	Nuevo Laredo	radiovoz1065.net	listen live
107.3	XHGTS	107.3 Me Gusta	Spanish Pop	Nuevo Laredo	xhgts.com	listen live
162.55	WXK26	NOAA Weather Radio	Weather	Laredo	noaa.gov	•

^{PR}:Suspected pirate radio stations since they are not licensed with Federal Communications Commission (FCC) in the United States or COFETEL in Mexico. Some pirate stations are suspected, due to the fact that other licensed stations nearby share the same frequency, such as 106.5 Radio Voz and KMAE from nearby Bruni, Texas and 103.3 Radio 33 and XHAHU-FM from nearby Anáhuac, Nuevo León, each city less than 50 miles from Laredo.

== Infrastructure ==
=== Health care ===
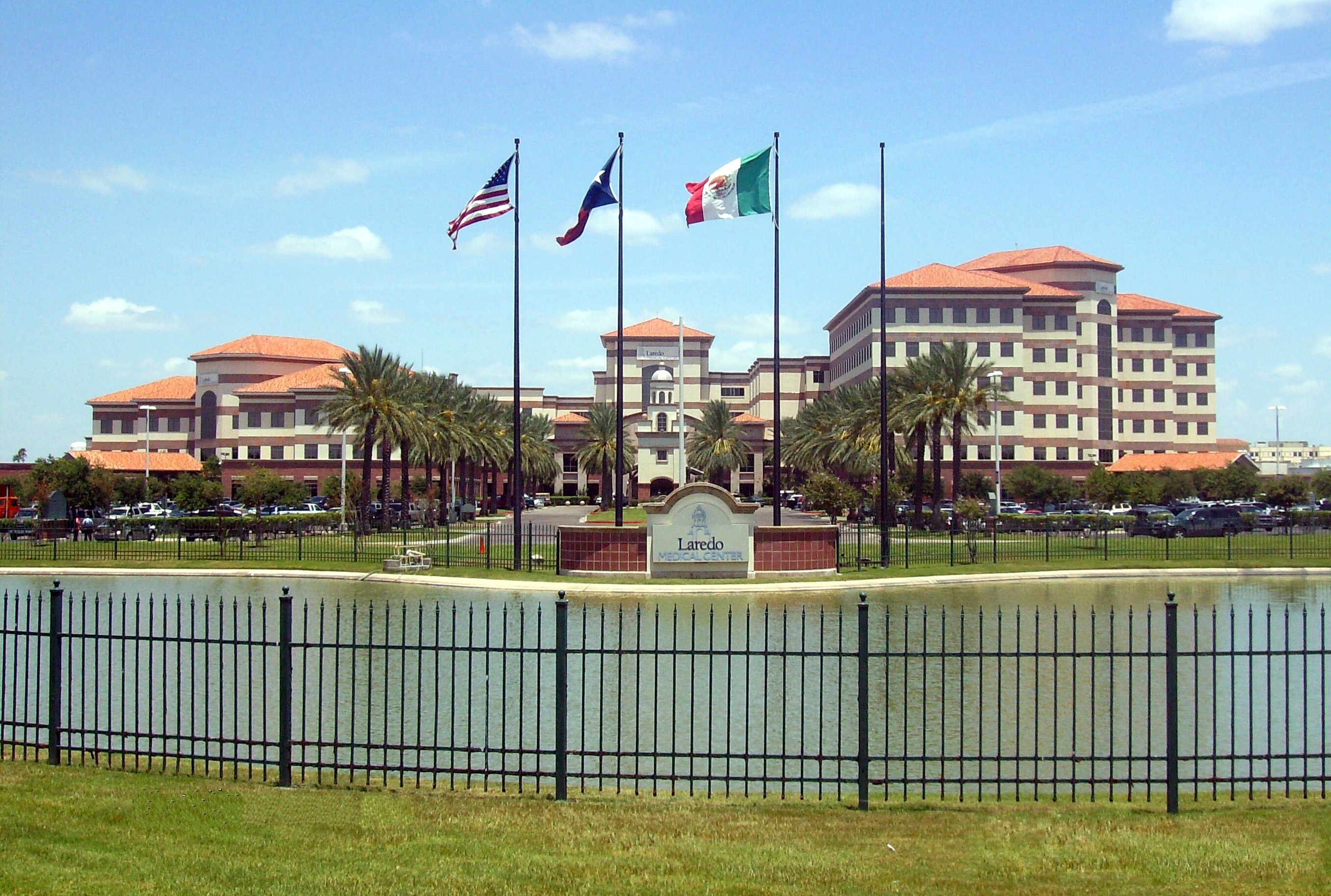
Laredo Medical Center, formerly Mercy Hospital, is the largest hospital in Laredo.

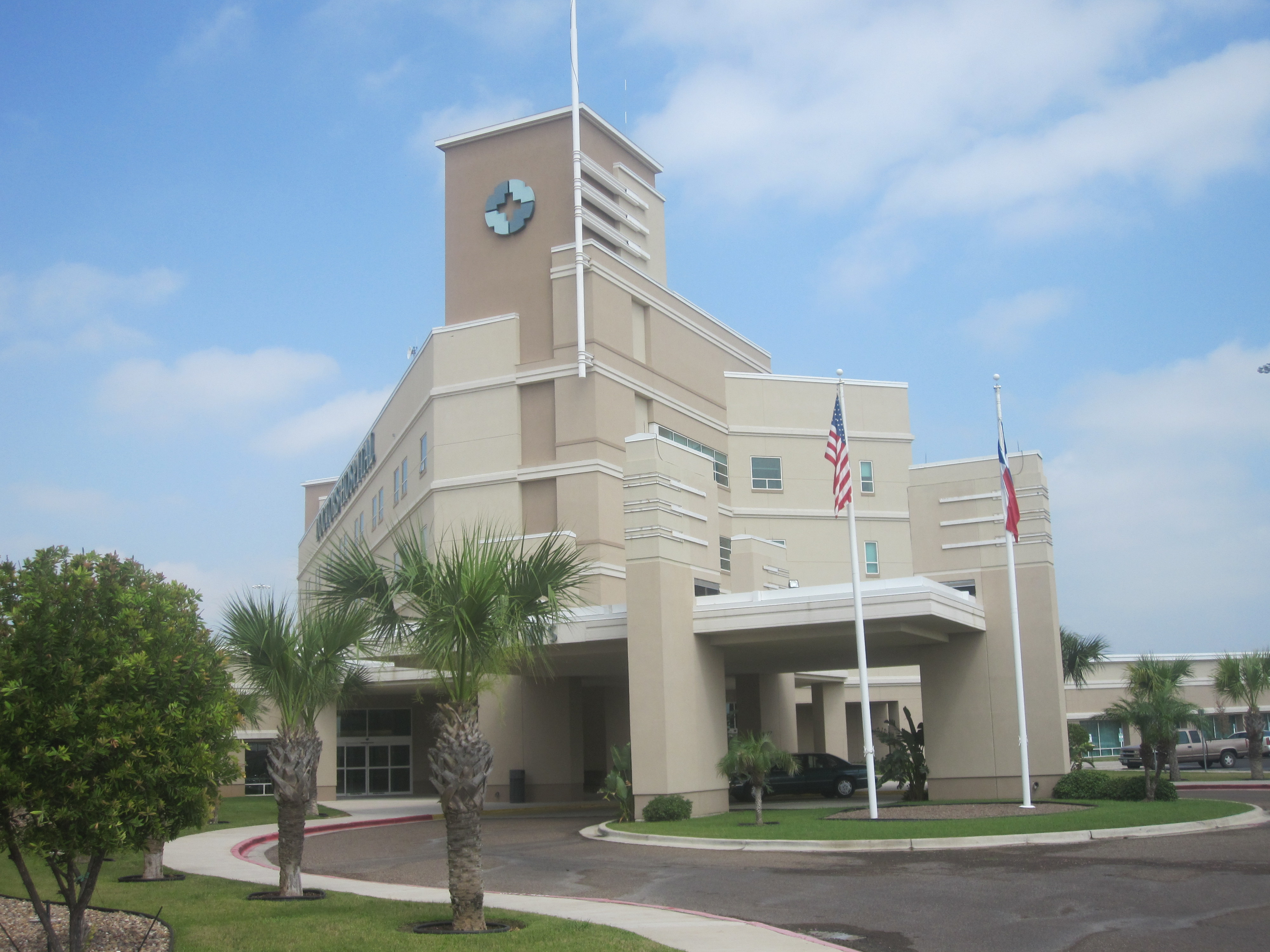
Doctor's Hospital in Laredo

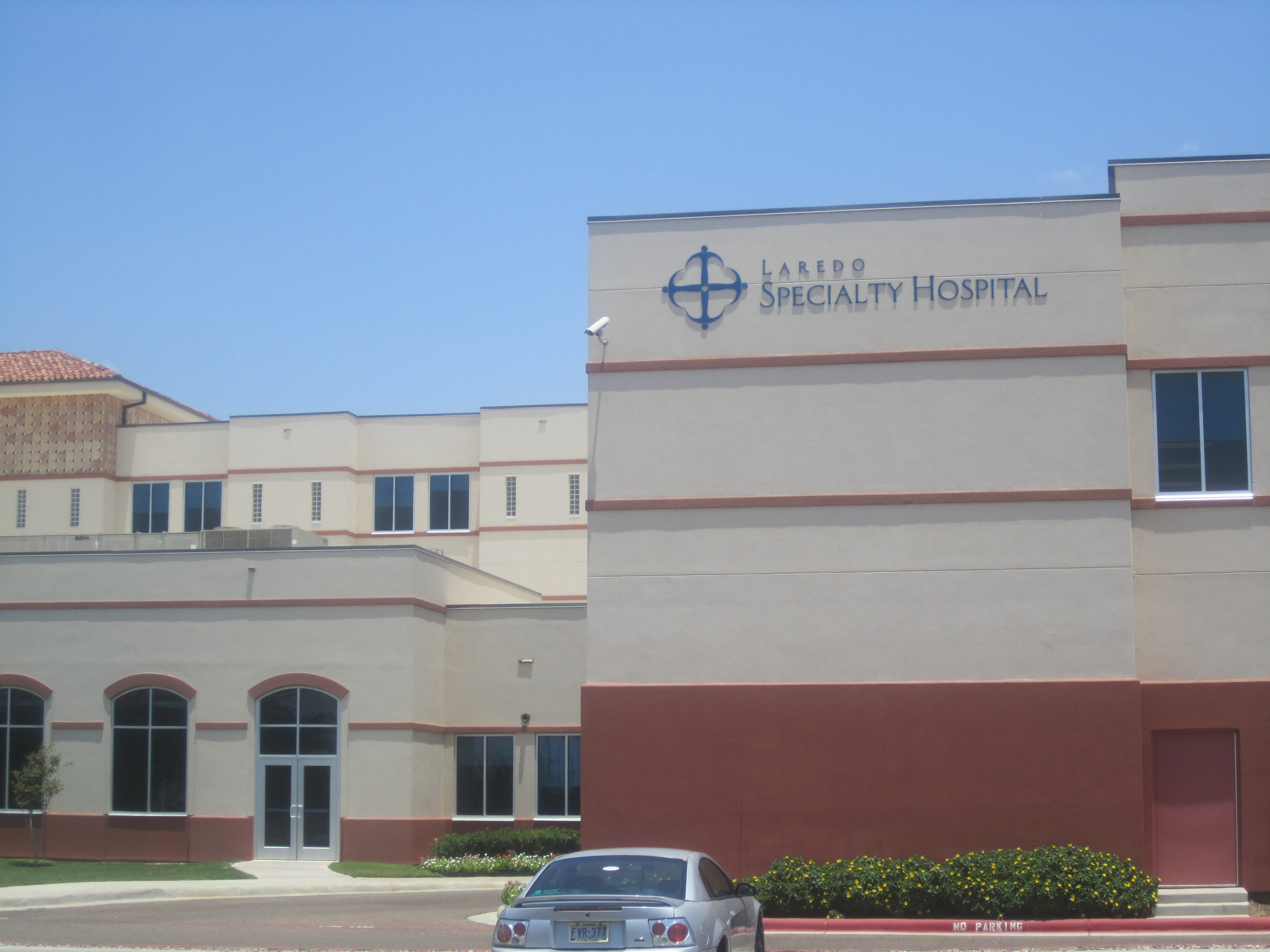
Laredo Specialty Hospital, near the Laredo Medical Center, handles certain patients requiring long-term care.

In addition to the University of Texas Health Science Center branch, there are five other principal medical centers in Laredo: the Laredo Medical Center, Doctor's Hospital, Gateway Community Health Center, Providence Surgical & Medical Center, and the Laredo Specialty Hospital.

Doctors Hospital is the second-largest medical center in Laredo. The hospital complex is over 250,000 square feet (23,000 m^{2}), with 180 licensed beds on a 58-acre (23 ha) campus. Affiliated with Universal Health Services, it is located on Loop 20 in north Laredo. The Doctors Regional Cancer Treatment Center offers comprehensive cancer services.

The Providence Surgical & Medical Center is an ambulatory health care center located in north-central Laredo and also owned by Universal Health Services.

The Gateway Community Health Center is the third-largest medical center in Laredo. The health center's main building is 64,000 square feet (5,900 m^{2}). The Medical center moved to its new $11,000,000 building in 2006. The main Gateway Community Health Center is located in East Laredo, close to U.S. Highway 59. It also has three branches in the Laredo area: the South Clinic, El Cenizo Community Center, and Quad City Community Center.
Gateway Community Health Center services include:

The Laredo Specialty Hospital is the fourth-largest medical center in Laredo. It is owned by Ernest Health Inc. and was founded by Elmo Lopez, Jr., on May 22, 2006, and admitted its first patient within hours of operation. The grand opening was held in March 2007.

=== Transportation ===
==== Air ====
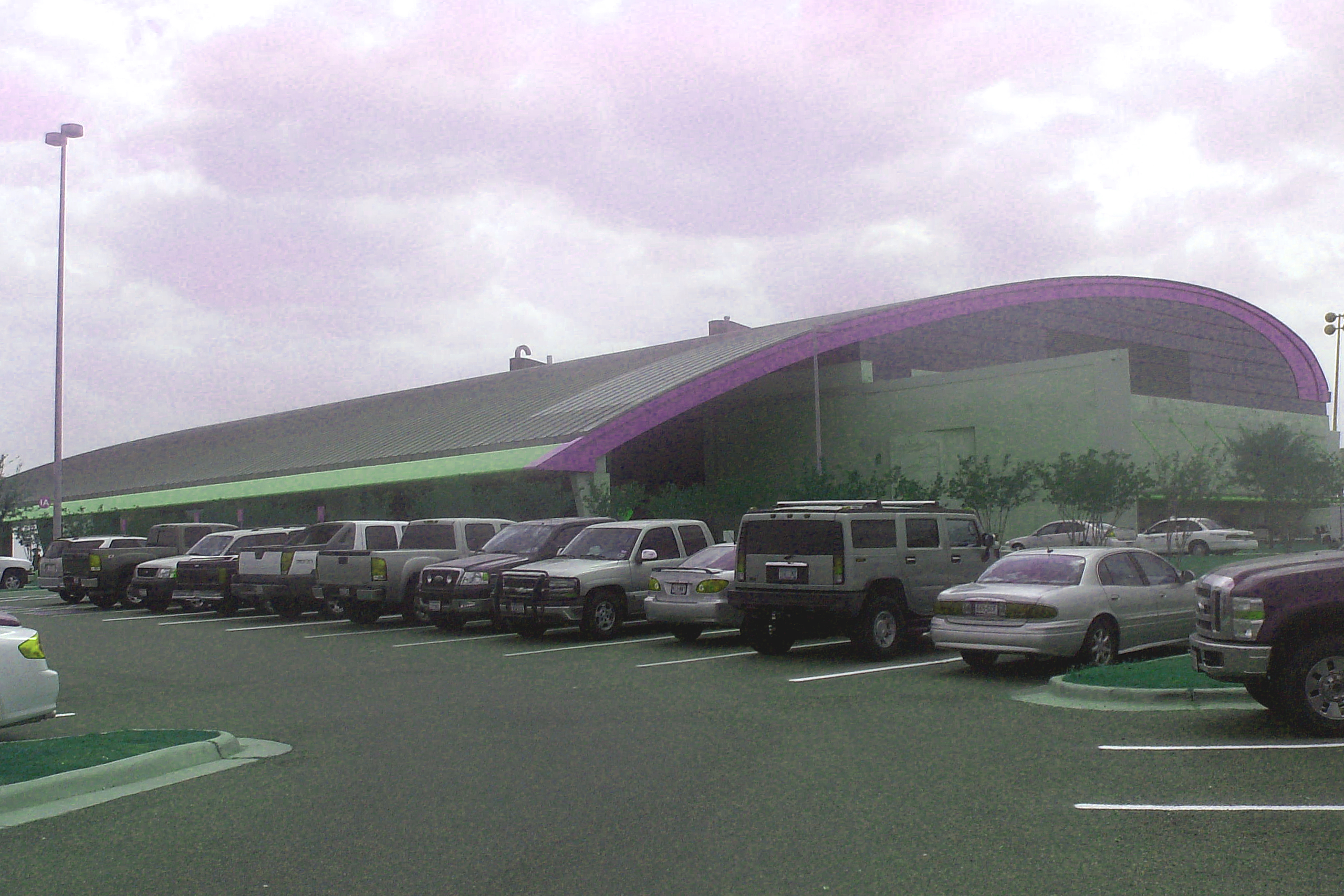
Laredo International Airport

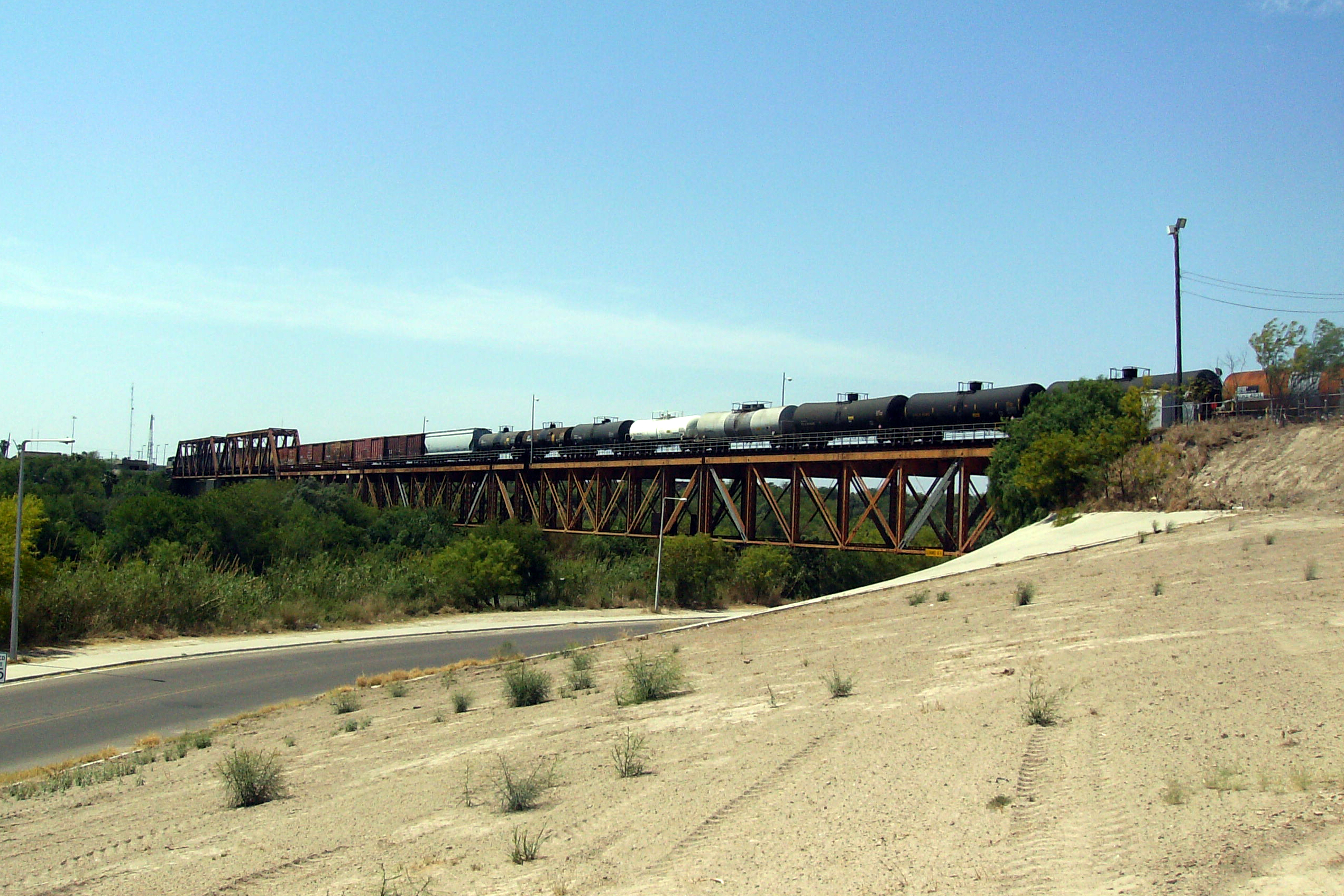
Tex-Mex Railway International Bridge view from Laredo

Laredo is served by the Laredo International Airport. Daily flights are available to Houston (George Bush Intercontinental Airport) and to Dallas/Fort Worth International Airport. Tri-weekly flights to Las Vegas, Nevada are available. After Laredo Air Force Base closed in the mid-1970s, the federal government handed over the old air force base and property to the City of Laredo for a new municipal airport. From the mid-1970s until the mid-1990s, the airport utilized a small terminal for passenger airline service and several old hangars for air cargo and private aircraft. A new state-of-the art passenger terminal was built along the then newly constructed Loop 20 to accommodate larger jets and to increase passenger air travel through Laredo. Expansion of air cargo facilities, taxiways and aprons, air cargo carriers such as DHL, FedEx, UPS, BAX, and others have responded by adding commercial air cargo jet services. Laredo also has two medical helipads, at Laredo Medical Center and Doctor's Hospital.

==== Mass transit ====
El Metro is the public transit system that operates in the city with 21 fixed routes and Paratransit services, with approximately 4.6 million passengers per year. El Metro works with a fleet of over 47 fixed route buses, 2 trolleys and 18 Paratransit/El Lift vans. The El Metro hub is located in downtown Laredo at El Metro Transit Center. The center also houses Greyhound Bus Lines and provides fee-based daily parking for downtown shoppers and workers.

==== Rural transit ====
Rural transportation is provided by the Webb County operated "El Aguila Rural Transportation" (the Eagle) bus services. El Aguila serves fixed daily routes from rural communities (Bruni, El Cenizo, Mirando City, Oilton, and Rio Bravo) to the downtown El Metro Transit Center.

== Sports ==
=== Laredo Heat ===
The Laredo Heat is a United Soccer Leagues Premier Development League team. The team's home stadium is the Texas A&M International University Soccer Complex. The team was founded in 2004. It plays in the Mid-South Division of the Southern Conference in the 2006 season the Laredo Heat finished Runner-up yet made it only to the first round of the Open Cup. In the 2007 season, the Laredo Heat were the Southern Conference champions. And in 2007 Laredo heat won its first PDL Championship.

=== Laredo Honey Badgers ===
The Laredo Honey Badgers, is professional indoor soccer team to be based in Laredo, Texas. Founded in April 2013, the team is expected to make its debut in the Professional Arena Soccer League with the 2013–14 season. The team will play its home games at the Laredo Energy Arena. The official name and colors (black and chrome) of the team were decided with fan participation.

=== Laredo Lemurs ===
The Laredo Lemurs, a professional baseball team based in Laredo, played their first season in the independent American Association in 2012. They won the South Division in their inaugural season, but were eliminated in the first playoff round. They play their home games at Uni-Trade Stadium.

=== Laredo Roses ===
The Laredo Roses are a professional women's full contact football team in the South Texas Sugar N Spice Football League that began play in the 2012 season. The Roses play their home games at the Uni-Trade Stadium. The female players use short shorts and halfcut jerseys during games.

Club	Sport	League	Venue	Established	Championships
Laredo Heat	Soccer	USL PDL	TAMIU Soccer Complex	2004	1 (2006)
Laredo Honey Badgers	Indoor Soccer	Professional Arena Soccer League	Laredo Energy Arena	2013	
Laredo Lemurs	Baseball	AAIPB	Uni-Trade Stadium	2011	
Laredo Roses	Women's Football	SNSFL	Uni-Trade Stadium	2012	

==== Defunct teams ====
Club	Sport	League	Venue	Championships	Years active
Laredo Apaches	Baseball	TLL	Veterans Field	0	1995
Laredo Broncos	Baseball	ULB	Veterans Field	0	2006–10
Laredo Bucks	Ice hockey	CHL	Laredo Energy Arena	2	2002–12
Laredo Law	Arena football	AF2	Laredo Energy Arena	0	2003–04
Laredo Lobos	Arena football	AF2	Laredo Energy Arena	0	2005–07
Laredo Rattlesnakes	Arena football	LSFL	Laredo Energy Arena	0	2011–13
Tecolotes de los Dos Laredos	Baseball	MBL	Veterans Field	5	1985–04
Toros de Los Dos Laredos	Basketball	LNBP	Laredo Energy Arena	2	2007–13

=== Stadiums and arenas ===
==== Laredo Energy Arena ====
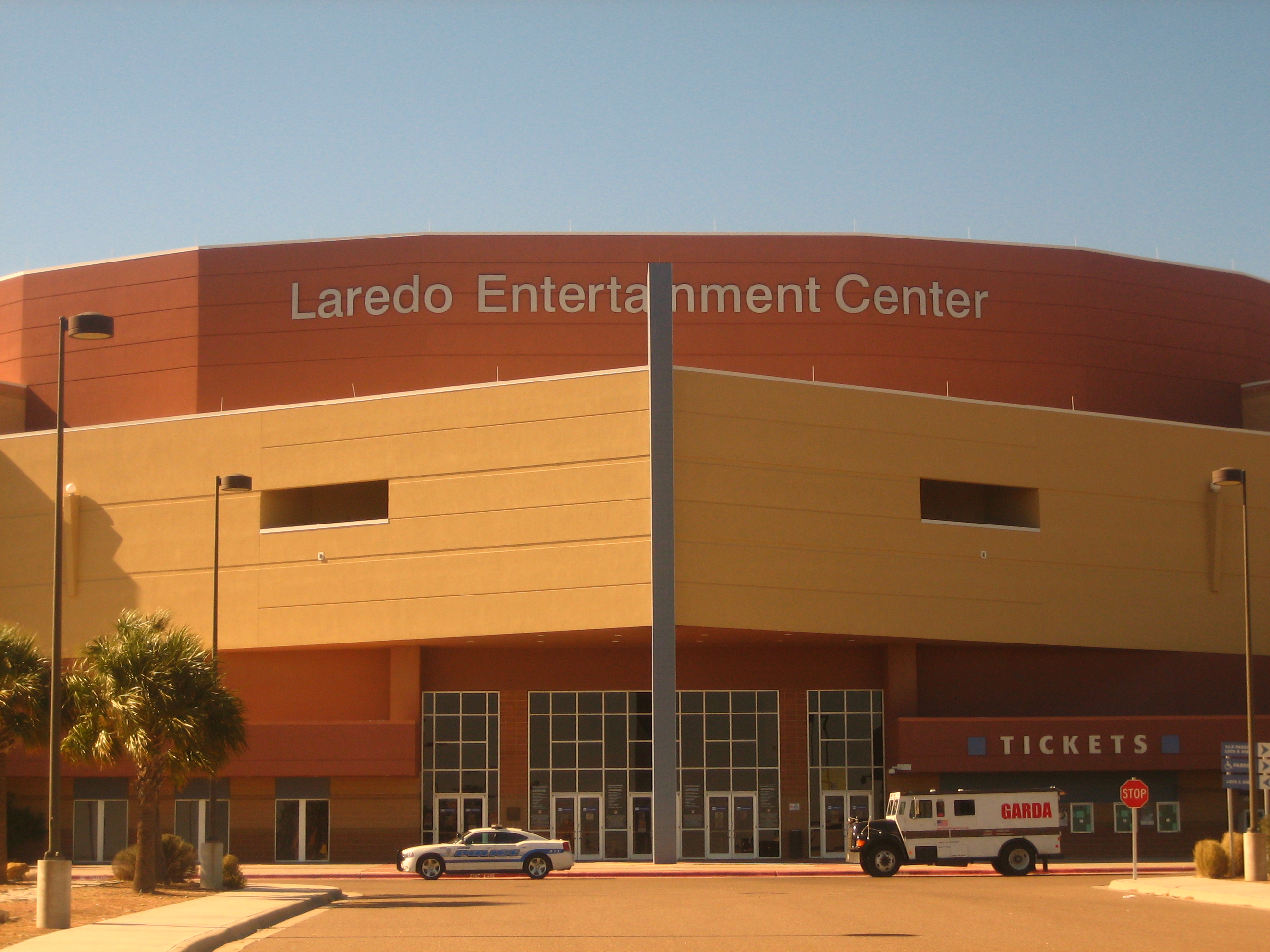
Laredo Energy Arena, formerly the Laredo Entertainment Center

The Laredo Energy Arena, formerly Laredo Entertainment Center, is located at Loop 20 and Jacaman Road. The LEA was strongly pushed to fruition by former Laredo Mayor Betty Flores. LEA was home to the former Laredo Bucks. The 178,000-square-foot (16,500 m^{2}), $36.5 million facility seats 8,002 people for ice hockey and arena football, and up to 10,000 for concerts. It has fourteen luxury suites, four meeting rooms and a private club for two hundred charter members. It was completed in mid-2002 through an increase in the Laredo sales tax of .25 percent. Sports that can be played at the LEA include hockey, arena football, indoor soccer, basketball, wrestling, and boxing. The arena also hosts many events such as the Laredo Hunting and Fishing Show, Miss Texas USA, Laredo Home and Garden Show, and high school graduation ceremonies. Well-known artists and bands that have performed in the arena include Lil Wayne, Rihanna, Kesha, Pitbull, Flo Rida, Shakira, Enrique Iglesias, Tool, Aerosmith, Kiss, Elton John, Styx, REO Speedwagon, ZZ Top, Lynyrd Skynyrd, Ricky Martin, George Lopez, T.I., Ludacris, Cher, Hilary Duff Monster Jam and WWE.

==== Uni-Trade Stadium ====
The Uni-Trade Stadium is Laredo's newest baseball field. The stadium is located near the Laredo Energy Arena. The project was first approved by the city council and was voted in favor of (with 61.32% of the votes in favor 38.68% against) constructing it with money collected since 2004 by a .25 percent sales tax increase. There is a surplus of about $15 million. The stadium will be home to the Laredo Lemurs.

==== Student Activity Complex ====
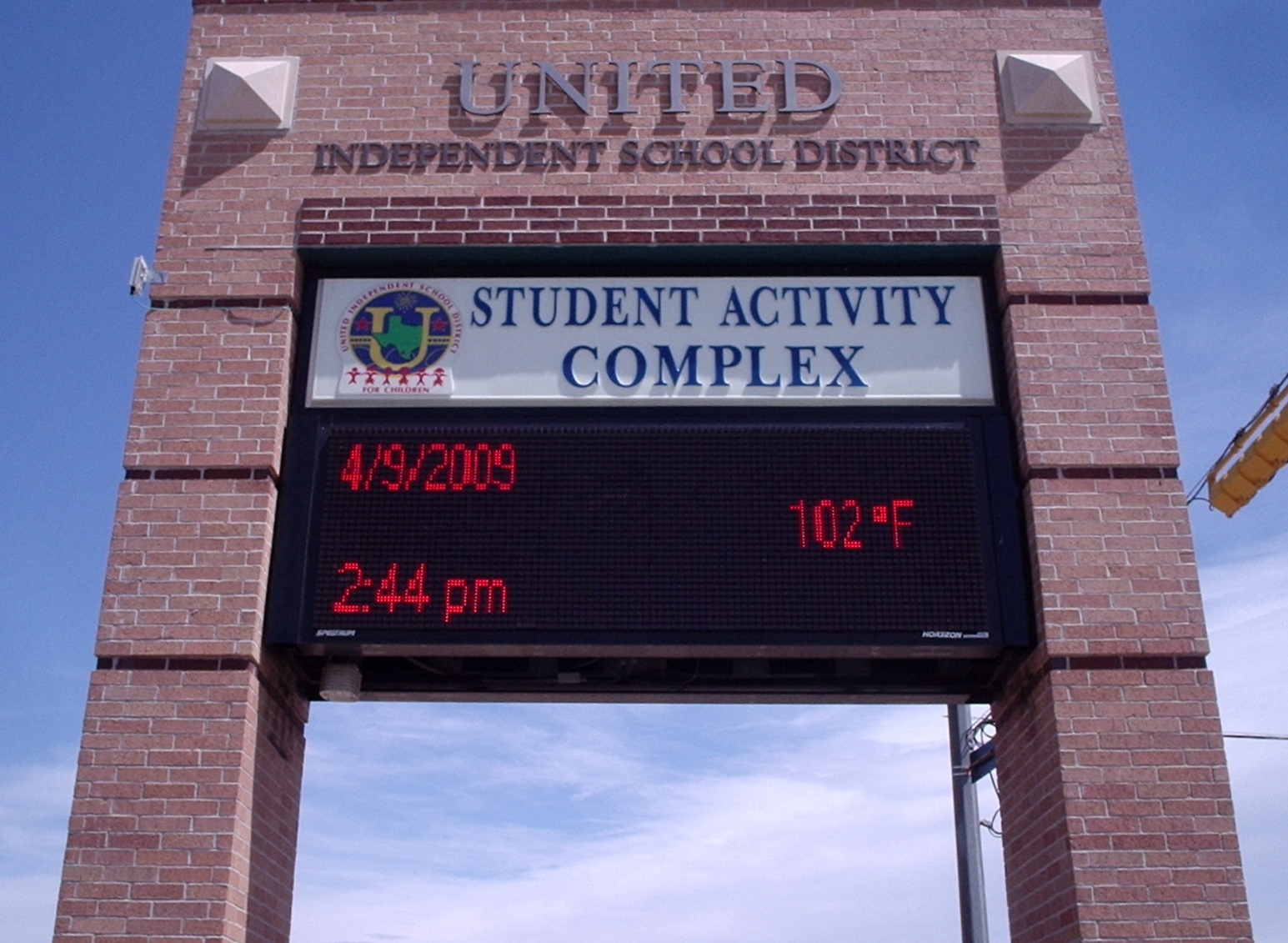
Entrance to the Student Activity Complex

Student Activity Complex is located on State Highway 359. It is utilized for United Independent School District's students. It was opened in the summer of 2002 and it contains the city's first artificial grass stadium. The SAC was also the home of the Laredo Heat. The capacity is 8,500 spectators. Sports played at the SAC include football, soccer, and baseball.

==== Texas A&M International University Soccer Complex ====
Texas A&M International University Soccer Complex (also known as Dustdevil Field and TAMIU Soccer Complex) was built in 2006 and renovated in 2007. The soccer complex is located at the Texas A&M International University campus. The complex has two soccer stadiums with a seating capacity of four thousand each. The Dustdevil Field is the new home stadium to the 2007 champion team Laredo Heat member of the United Soccer Leagues Premier Development League (PDL) and the TAMIU Dustdevils women and men's soccer teams member of the Heartland Conference, NCAA Division II.

==== Shirley Field ====
The original Shirley Field was located next to the Civic Center and R&T Martin High School on San Bernardo Avenue. It was built in 1937, along with Martin High School. Shirley Field was the location for outdoor athletics for Laredo Independent School District and also hosts the annual Border Olympics events. It seats up to about 6,000 fans with additional seating at the 2 endzones. Professional Mexican soccer teams have played various exhibition games here, noting that the real grass allows for "better" soccer games. The various sports played on the stadium are football, soccer and track & field events. Major renovations are slated for this historic stadium. In November 2009 Shirley Field was demolished and was rebuilt by the 2011 football season. The total cost of the reconstruction was $12,000,000 and it now seats 8,000 fans and features artificial turf.

==== Krueger Field ====
Krueger Field is located in north Laredo and is owned by United independent school District. The stadium has a capacity of 5,000 and is used to play football and soccer high school games. It is home to United High School's and John B. Alexander High School's football and soccer teams.

==== Veterans Field ====
Veterans Field is a baseball park which was previously known as West Martin Field. Its capacity is about 5,000. Major renovation is happening to update the 1950 ball park. Veterans Field was also the home to the five-time champion Mexican Baseball League team Tecolotes de los Dos Laredos from 1985 to 2003. Veterans Field is also home to the Texas A&M International University's Heartland Conference NCAA Division II Dustdevils baseball team.

==== Laredo Civic Center ====
Prior to the construction of the Laredo Energy Arena most major concerts and shows were performed at the Laredo Civic Center. The Laredo Civic Center complex has an auditorium with 1,979 seats and a banquet and exhibit hall with 1,635 seats.

== See also ==
- Texas census statistical areas
