= Apache Ranch, Texas =

Unincorporated community in Texas, US

Apache Ranch
- Unincorporated community
- Location in Texas
- Coordinates: 27°57′49″N 99°53′46″W
- Country: United States
- State: Texas
- County: Webb

Apache Ranch, formerly Los Apaches, is an unincorporated community in Webb County, Texas, United States. Situated on the Rio Grande, the community was based in agriculture, and was settled in the 1960s. North Apache Ranch Lake and South Apache Ranch Lake in Webb County share a name with the community, but it is unknown which was named first.
