= Webb County–City of Laredo Regional Mobility Authority =

Webb County - City of Laredo Regional Mobility Authority
Authority overview
- Formed: February 27, 2014
- Jurisdiction: Webb County, Texas

The Webb County - City of Laredo Regional Mobility Authority aka Webb County - Laredo RMA in Texas, USA, does not currently operate any roads, but in the future will operate toll roads located inside Webb County.

== History ==
The Webb County - Laredo RMA was inaugurated on February 27, 2014.

== Roadway System ==
The Authority has a series of road projects:

- Loop 20/US 59/I-69W : Upgrade to an urban interstate expressway
- Vallecillo Road : construct new roadway
- Hatchar Parkway : construct new roadway
- Loop 20/Cuatro Vientos Roadway : add 4 interchanges
- US 59/I-69W upgrade : Laredo City limits to Duval County Line
- Laredo Outer Loop : Relief route corridor from SH 255 to Rio Bravo/El Cenizo/Future International Bridge V
