= LareDOS =

LareDOS (December 1994 - September 2014)
- Type: Monthly newspaper
- Format: Compact
- Owner(s): Maria Eugenia Guerra
- Founded: December 1994; 30 years ago
- Political alignment: Neutral
- Headquarters: Laredo, Webb County, Texas, USA

LareDOS was an independent monthly newspaper published in Laredo, Texas, and distributed free of charge. The newspaper was widely praised and also criticized for its controversial stories on local politics.

LareDOS was founded by Maria Eugenia "Meg" Guerra and Richard Geissler in December 1994. The newspaper took pride that it was 100 percent owned by a Latina since Guerra bought out Geissler in 1996. LareDOS also used the branding of "A Journal of the borderlands".

In April 2011, LareDOS publisher Guerra received the First Amendment Community Watchdog Award from the Society of Professional Journalists, Fort Worth Chapter for two stories concerning the state of living in the colonias near Laredo, Texas, and damage done to the National Historic Landmark, Fort Treviño in San Ygnacio, Texas, when city workers accidentally sprayed tar all over the walls of the historic building when they were paving a road.

In September 2014, owner and publisher Guerra discontinued the financially unsuccessful publication.
