= Nye, Texas =

Coordinates: 27°33′35″N 99°30′25″W

- Former Town
- Interactive map of Nye, Texas
- Country: United States
- State: Texas
- County: Webb
- Established: 1882
- Time zone: UTC-6 (CST)
  - Summer (DST): UTC-5 (CST)
- Area code: +1-956
- Nearest Airports: Laredo: Laredo International Airport KLRD LRD Nuevo Laredo: Quetzalcoatl International Airport MMNL NLD

Nye is a former town two miles north of Laredo in southwestern Webb County, Texas, United States. It was named after Thomas C. Nye, a local planter who introduced Bermuda Onions into the community in 1898.

The area was eventually absorbed by the neighboring city of Laredo.
