= La Moca Ranch, Texas =

- Census-designated place
- Location within Texas Location within the United States
- Coordinates: 27°54′6″N 99°30′3″W
- Country: United States
- State: Texas
- County: Webb

Area
  - Total: 15.1 sq mi (39.0 km^{2})
  - Land: 15.1 sq mi (39.0 km^{2})
  - Water: 0 sq mi (0.0 km^{2})
- Elevation: 760 ft (230 m)
- Time zone: UTC-6 (Central (CST))
  - Summer (DST): UTC-5 (CDT)
- ZIP Code: 78045 (Laredo)
- Area code: 956
- FIPS code: 47-41180
- GNIS feature ID: 2805848

La Moca Ranch is a colonia and census-designated place (CDP) in Webb County, Texas, United States. It was first listed as a CDP prior to the 2020 census. As of the 2020 census, La Moca Ranch had a population of 25.

It is in the northern part of the county, along U.S. Route 83, and bordered to the east by Los Huisaches. US-83 leads south 30 miles (48 km) to Laredo and north-northwest 53 miles (85 km) to Carrizo Springs.

== Demographics ==
Historical population
Census	Pop.	Note	%±
2020	25		—
U.S. Decennial Census; 1850–1900 1910; 1920 1930 1940; 1950 1960 1970; 1980 1990 2000; 2010 2020

La Moca Ranch first appeared as a census designated place in the 2020 U.S. census.

=== 2020 census ===
La Moca Ranch CDP, Texas – Racial and ethnic composition Note: the US Census treats Hispanic/Latino as an ethnic category. This table excludes Latinos from the racial categories and assigns them to a separate category. Hispanics/Latinos may be of any race.
Race / Ethnicity (NH = Non-Hispanic)	Pop 2020	% 2020
White alone (NH)	3	12.00%
Black or African American alone (NH)	0	0.00%
Native American or Alaska Native alone (NH)	0	0.00%
Asian alone (NH)	0	0.00%
Native Hawaiian or Pacific Islander alone (NH)	0	0.00%
Other race alone (NH)	0	0.00%
Mixed race or Multiracial (NH)	0	0.00%
Hispanic or Latino (any race)	22	88.00%
Total	25	100.00%

== Education ==
Residents are in the United Independent School District. Zoned schools include: San Isidro Elementary School, Elias Herrera Middle School, United High School.

The designated community college for Webb County is Laredo Community College.
