= El Metro Transit =

Bus transportation provider in Laredo, Texas

El Metro
- Headquarters: 1302 Farragut St
- Locale: Laredo, Texas
- Service area: Webb County, Texas
- Service type: bus, paratransit
- Routes: 24
- Fleet: 50 buses
- Annual ridership: 4.3 million
- Operator: First Transit
- Website: El Metro

El Metro Transit is the operator of public transportation in Laredo, Texas. Twenty-three bus routes are operated in a hub and spoke system, with each terminating in a downtown transit center. Most routes function seven days per week.

== Fleet ==
Number	Type	Notes
63	Bus	Fixed Routes
18	El Lift Van	On demand for the handicap
3	Trolley	Service Downtown Laredo

== Route list ==
The following is El Metro Transit route list:

- 1 Santa Maria
- 2A San Bernardo/Mall Del Norte
- 2B San Bernardo/Calton
- 3 Covenant
- 4 Springfield
- 5 Tilden
- 6 Cedar
- 7 LCC
- 8A Guadalupe/Lane
- 8B Guadalupe/Via del Sol
- 9 Market
- 10 Corpus Christi
- 11 Gustavus/Lea
- 12A Del Mar Express
- 12B Shiloh Express
- 13 Heritage Park
- 14 Santa Rita
- 15 Main/Riverside
- 16 TAMIU Campus
- 17 Mines Rd
- 18 Hop n Shop Trolley
- 19 Santo Niño
- 20 Los Angeles
- 21 Google Services
