= Las Tiendas, Texas =

- unincorporated community
- Location in Texas Location in the United States
- Coordinates: 27°54′10″N 99°38′22″W
- Country: United States
- State: Texas
- County: Webb
- Established: 1900
- Elevation: 607 ft (185 m)

Population
  - Total: 30
- Time zone: UTC-6 (CST)
  - Summer (DST): UTC-5 (CST)
- Area code: +1-956
- GNIS feature ID: 1378564
- Nearest Airports: Laredo: Laredo International Airport KLRD LRD Nuevo Laredo: Quetzalcoatl International Airport MMNL NLD

Las Tiendas is a small unincorporated ranching community in northwestern Webb County, Texas, United States. The community's name is Spanish for "the shops" or "the tents".
