= Pescadito, Texas =

Coordinates: 27°30′38″N 99°15′27″W

- Ghost town
- Interactive map of Pescadito, Texas
- Country: United States
- State: Texas
- County: Webb
- Established: 1881
- Elevation: 554 ft (169 m)

Population
  - Total: Ghost Town
- Time zone: UTC-6 (CST)
  - Summer (DST): UTC-5 (CST)
- Area code: +1-956
- GNIS feature ID: 1378851
- Nearest Airports: Laredo: Laredo International Airport KLRD LRD Nuevo Laredo: Quetzalcoatl International Airport MMNL NLD

Pescadito was a town near Laredo in southwestern Webb County, Texas, United States. Pescadito was a stop on the Texas Mexican Railway in 1881. In 1930, it had a population of 25. The community's main business was mesquite wood for railroads, until coal began to be used in 1946.
