= Santo Tomás, Texas =

Coordinates: 27°44′39″N 99°45′05″W

- Ghost town
- Interactive map of Santo Tomás, Texas
- Country: United States
- State: Texas
- County: Webb
- Established: 1873
- Elevation: 532 ft (162 m)

Population
  - Total: 0
- Time zone: UTC-6 (CST)
  - Summer (DST): UTC-5 (CST)
- Area code: +1-956
- GNIS feature ID: 1385385
- Nearest Airports: Laredo: Laredo International Airport (KLRD) (LRD) Nuevo Laredo: Quetzalcoatl International Airport (MMNL) (NLD))

Santo Tomás was a coal-mining town near Laredo in west central Webb County, Texas, United States. The town was founded in 1801 by Antonio Gonzales and was named in honor of Saint Thomas. During the colonial era, the land was used primarily for ranching. Pure quality cannel coal was found and extracted in 1873. In June 1882, the narrow-gauge Rio Grande and Pecos Railroad was built to transport the coal. By 1900, the town grew and had a population of approximately 1,000. By 1920, all the mines had closed and the population of Santo Tomás decreased to 18. Today, Santo Tomás is a ghost town near the Colombia-Solidarity International Bridge.
