= Larga Vista, Texas =

- Former CDP
- Location within the state of Texas
- Coordinates: 27°30′3″N 99°25′47″W
- Country: United States
- State: Texas
- County: Webb

Area
  - Total: 0.77 sq mi (2.0 km^{2})
  - Land: 0.77 sq mi (2.0 km^{2})
  - Water: 0 sq mi (0.0 km^{2})
- Elevation: 476 ft (145 m)

Population (2000)
  - Total: 742
  - Density: 960/sq mi (370/km^{2})
- Time zone: UTC-6 (Central (CST))
  - Summer (DST): UTC-5 (CDT)
- FIPS code: 48-41482
- GNIS feature ID: 2408574

Larga Vista is a former census-designated place (CDP) in Webb County, Texas, United States. The population was 742 at the 2000 census. Larga Vista lost its census-designated place status in 2010 because it became surrounded by Laredo. A CDP may not be located, either partially or entirely, within an incorporated place or another CDP. Today, Larga Vista is considered a Laredo neighborhood.

== Geography ==
Larga Vista is located at 27°30′3″N 99°25′47″W (27.500806, -99.429665).

According to the United States Census Bureau, the CDP has a total area of 0.8 square mile (2.0 km^{2}), all land.

== Demographics ==
Historical population
Census	Pop.	Note	%±
2000	742		—
U.S. Decennial Census; 1850–1900 1910; 1920 1930 1940; 1950 1960 1970; 1980 1990 2000; 2010

Larga Vista first appeared as a census designated place in the 2000 U.S. census. It was absorbed by the city of Laredo prior to the 2010 U.S. census.

Larga Vista CDP, Texas – Racial and ethnic composition Note: the US Census treats Hispanic/Latino as an ethnic category. This table excludes Latinos from the racial categories and assigns them to a separate category. Hispanics/Latinos may be of any race.
Race / Ethnicity (NH = Non-Hispanic)	Pop 2000	% 2000
White alone (NH)	22	2.96%
Black or African American alone (NH)	1	0.13%
Native American or Alaska Native alone (NH)	0	0.00%
Asian alone (NH)	1	0.13%
Pacific Islander alone (NH)	0	0.00%
Other race alone (NH)	0	0.00%
Mixed race or Multiracial (NH)	0	0.00%
Hispanic or Latino (any race)	718	96.77%
Total	742	100.00%

As of the census of 2000, there were 742 people, 180 households, and 167 families residing in the CDP. The population density was 958.4 inhabitants per square mile (370.0/km^{2}). There were 193 housing units at an average density of 249.3 per square mile (96.3/km^{2}). The racial makeup of the CDP was 79.11% White, 0.67% African American, 0.13% Native American, 0.13% Asian, 16.04% from other races, and 3.91% from two or more races. Hispanic or Latino of any race were 96.77% of the population.

There were 180 households, out of which 60.6% had children under the age of 18 living with them, 75.6% were married couples living together, 11.1% had a female householder with no husband present, and 7.2% were non-families. 6.7% of all households were made up of individuals, and 1.7% had someone living alone who was 65 years of age or older. The average household size was 4.12 and the average family size was 4.31.

In the CDP, the population was spread out, with 38.7% under the age of 18, 12.9% from 18 to 24, 29.6% from 25 to 44, 13.5% from 45 to 64, and 5.3% who were 65 years of age or older. The median age was 24 years. For every 100 females, there were 95.8 males. For every 100 females age 18 and over, there were 92.0 males.

The median income for a household in the CDP was $23,313, and the median income for a family was $25,179. Males had a median income of $20,119 versus $12,386 for females. The per capita income for the CDP was $7,051. About 25.3% of families and 29.1% of the population were below the poverty line, including 42.6% of those under age 18 and none of those age 65 or over.

== Education ==
Larga Vista is a part of the United Independent School District.

The designated community college for Webb County is Laredo Community College.
