= Los Corralitos, Texas =

- CDP
- Interactive map of Los Corralitos, Texas
- Coordinates: 27°38′28″N 99°33′27″W
- Country: United States
- State: Texas
- County: Webb
- Elevation: 492 ft (150 m)

Population (2020)
  - Total: 36
- Time zone: UTC-6 (Central (CST))
  - Summer (DST): UTC-5 (CDT)
- Zip Code: 78045
- GNIS feature ID: 2584683

Los Corralitos is a census-designated place (CDP) in Webb County, Texas, United States. It was a new CDP for the 2010 census. As of the 2020 census, Los Corralitos had a population of 36.

== Geography ==
Los Corralitos is located at 27°38′28″N 99°33′27″W (27.641193, -99.557476).

== Demographics ==
Historical population
Census	Pop.	Note	%±
2010	35		—
2020	36		2.9%
U.S. Decennial Census; 1850–1900 1910; 1920 1930 1940; 1950 1960 1970; 1980 1990 2000; 2010 2020

Los Corralitos first appeared as a census designated place in the 2010 U.S. census.

=== 2020 census ===
Los Corralitos CDP, Texas – Racial and ethnic composition Note: the US Census treats Hispanic/Latino as an ethnic category. This table excludes Latinos from the racial categories and assigns them to a separate category. Hispanics/Latinos may be of any race.
Race / Ethnicity (NH = Non-Hispanic)	Pop 2010	Pop 2020	% 2010	% 2020
White alone (NH)	0	3	0.00%	8.33%
Black or African American alone (NH)	0	0	0.00%	0.00%
Native American or Alaska Native alone (NH)	0	0	0.00%	0.00%
Asian alone (NH)	0	0	0.00%	0.00%
Native Hawaiian or Pacific Islander alone (NH)	0	0	0.00%	0.00%
Other race alone (NH)	0	1	0.00%	2.78%
Mixed race or Multiracial (NH)	0	0	0.00%	0.00%
Hispanic or Latino (any race)	35	32	100.00%	88.89%
Total	35	36	100.00%	100.00%

== Education ==
Residents are in the United Independent School District. Zoned schools include: Julia Bird Jones Muller Elementary School, George Washington Middle School, and United High School.

The designated community college for Webb County is Laredo Community College.
