= Los Ojuelos, Texas =

- Ghost town
- Interactive map of Los Ojuelos, Texas
- Coordinates: 27°24′11″N 98°59′47″W
- Country: United States
- State: Texas
- County: Webb
- Settled: 1810
- Elevation: 810 ft (250 m)

Population
  - Total: 0
- Time zone: UTC-6 (CST)
  - Summer (DST): UTC-5 (CST)
- Area code: +1-956
- GNIS feature ID: 1378611
- Nearest Airports: Laredo: Laredo International Airport KLRD LRD Nuevo Laredo: Quetzalcoatl International Airport MMNL NLD

- Los Ojuelos
- U.S. National Register of Historic Places
- U.S. Historic district
- Location within Texas Location within the United States
- Nearest city: Mirando City, Texas
- Area: 20 acres (8.1 ha)
- Built: 1879
- Architectural style: Mission/Spanish Revival
- NRHP reference No.: 76002084
- Added to NRHP: December 22, 1976

Los Ojuelos is a ghost town near Mirando City in the southeastern part of Webb County, Texas, United States. Before its establishment, Indians camped near the only dependable water source in the semiarid area. The local springs attracted Eugenio Gutiérrez in 1810 and attempted to settle in the area. Frequent Indian attacks forced Gutiérrez to abandon the site. in 1835, Eugenio's son returned to the site and tried to resettle the area but Indian attacks drove him back. In 1850, a company of Texas Rangers were stationed on the site to protect the trade route Laredo - Corpus Christi. In 1857, José María Guerra, grandson of Eugenio Gutiérrez and an ancestor of Laredo businessman Joe A. Guerra, built an irrigation system and a wall around Los Ojuelos to protect from Indian attacks.

By 1860, Los Ojuelos' population grew to 400. In 1855, the Texas-Mexican railroad bypassed the town by a few miles. As of 1904, the population had declined to 174. In 1920, oil was found nearby, but Mirando City was established. The oil boom helped Los Ojuelos grow, but in 1950 drilling for oil stopped. Today, Los Ojuelos remains a ghost town.

== National Register of Historic Places ==
The National Register of Historic Places added Los Ojuelos (#76002084) to its registered historic districts in 1976. Its historic significance includes information potential and its 1850–1874, 1875-1899 mission Spanish Revival architecture and engineering. The main structures of significance are a religious structure, school, and a specialty store.

== See also ==
- National Register of Historic Places listings in Webb County, Texas
