= Darwin, Texas =

- Ghost Town
- Interactive map of Darwin, Texas
- Coordinates: 27°42′43″N 99°44′43″W
- Country: United States
- State: Texas
- County: Webb County
- Established: 1882

Population
  - Total: 0
- Time zone: UTC-6 (CST)
  - Summer (DST): UTC-5 (CST)
- Area code: +1-956
- Nearest Airports: Laredo: Laredo International Airport KLRD LRD Nuevo Laredo: Quetzalcoatl International Airport MMNL NLD

Darwin was a coal mining town near Laredo in west central Webb County, Texas, United States at the confluence of the Rio Grande and Santo Tomas creek, near the present day Colombia-Solidarity International Bridge. It was founded in 1882 after coal was found near the area. It was named after David Darwin Davis, the Cannel Coal Company owner. As of 1914, the town's population had grown to 800 and the Rio Grande and Eagle Pass Railroad was built to transport the coal extracted in nearby mines. By 1939, the mines were shut down and the population declined to 75. Today, Darwin is a ghost town, of which all that remains is a cemetery.
