= Islitas, Texas =

Coordinates: 27°40′02″N 99°39′11″W

- Ghost town
- Interactive map of Islitas, Texas
- Country: United States
- State: Texas
- County: Webb
- Established: 1882
- Elevation: 492 ft (150 m)
- Time zone: UTC-6 (CST)
  - Summer (DST): UTC-5 (CST)
- Area code: +1-956
- GNIS feature ID: 1378485
- Nearest Airports: Laredo: Laredo International Airport KLRD LRD Nuevo Laredo: Quetzalcoatl International Airport MMNL NLD

Islitas is a ghost town in southwestern Webb County, Texas, United States. It was established as a railroad stop and coal shipping center on the Rio Grande and Pecos Valley Railroad in 1882. In 1914, Islitas experienced its peak population of 300. After that year, the local mines declined in production. As of 1920, the last census report for the community showed 100 people.
