= Callaghan, Texas =

- Unincorporated community
- Interactive map of Callaghan, Texas
- Coordinates: 27°52′28″N 99°23′54″W
- Country: United States
- State: Texas
- County: Webb
- Established: 1881

Area
  - Total: 0.85 sq mi (2.2 km^{2})
  - Land: 0.85 sq mi (2.2 km^{2})
  - Water: 0 sq mi (0.0 km^{2})
- Elevation: 610 ft (190 m)

Population (1990)
  - Total: <100
- Time zone: UTC-6 (CST)
  - Summer (DST): UTC-5 (CST)
- Zip Code: 78045
- Area code: +1-956
- GNIS feature ID: 1378085
- Nearest Airports: Laredo: Laredo International Airport (KLRD) (LRD) Nuevo Laredo: Quetzalcoatl International Airport (MMNL) (NLD)

Callaghan is a ranching community in Webb County, Texas, United States which was established in 1881. The community was named after a nearby ranch owned by Charles Callaghan, and much later, Joe B. Finley. The community was once a cattle shipping point on the International and Great Northern Railroad. Callaghan is served by the Callaghan Ranch Airport (ICAO: 90TX). Callaghan is fourteen miles north of Laredo.

== Geography ==
Callaghan is located at 27°52′28″N 99°23′54″W (27.879444, -99.396667).

== Education ==
Callaghan is served by the United Independent School District in Laredo.
