= Laredo Honey Badgers =

- Founded: 2013
- Dissolved: 2014
- Ground: Laredo Energy Arena; 6700 Arena Boulevard; Laredo, Texas 78041
- Capacity: 8,065
- Owner: Dr. Judson Somerville
- General Manager: Robbie Garcia
- League: PASL

The Laredo Honey Badgers were an American professional indoor soccer franchise based in Laredo, Texas. Founded in April 2013, the team was expected to make its debut in the Professional Arena Soccer League with the 2013–14 season but that launch was initially delayed until 2014 then cancelled after owner Judson Somerville suffered financial and legal setbacks. The team was to play its home games at the Laredo Energy Arena.

== History ==
Former name and logo of Laredo Honey Badgers

The team's initial name, Laredo Diesel, and colors (black and chrome) were decided with fan participation and announced in May 2013. On July 24, 2013, Laredo franchise owner Dr. Judson Somerville named Robbie Garcia as the team's general manager and, citing marketability, announced that the team had changed its name from Diesel to Honey Badgers.

On September 17, 2013, team officials confirmed that they would not debut as planned after the league's 2013–14 schedule did not include them. General manager Robbie Garcia cited the limited time the team had to organize and committed to launching in the 2014–15 season.

This postponement became cancellation after Somerville's other sports franchise, the Laredo Rattlesnakes of the Lone Star Football League, announced that team was ceasing operations on September 30, 2013, citing the legal and financial difficulties facing the owner.

== See also ==
- Honey badger
