= Webb, Texas =

- unincorporated community
- Interactive map of Webb, Texas
- Coordinates: 27°47′33″N 99°25′22″W
- Country: United States
- State: Texas
- County: Webb
- Established: 1881
- Elevation: 630 ft (190 m)

Population (1990)
  - Total: 40
- Time zone: UTC-6 (CST)
  - Summer (DST): UTC-5 (CST)
- Area code: +1-956
- GNIS feature ID: 1379247
- Nearest Airports: Laredo: Laredo International Airport KLRD LRD Nuevo Laredo: Quetzalcoatl International Airport MMNL NLD

Webb is a rural unincorporated community in Webb County, Texas, United States, located 20 miles north of Laredo. According to the 1990 census, it had a population of 40.

== History ==
Webb was established as a railroad stop on the International-Great Northern Railroad in 1881. The town was named in honor of the county in which it was founded. A Webb post office, established in 1909, was still in operation in 1980. According to a local count in 1914 Webb, Texas had a population of 100, but its population declined to 25 by 1936.
