= Webb County, Texas =

County in Texas, United States

Coordinates: 27.77°N 99.33°W

Webb County
- County
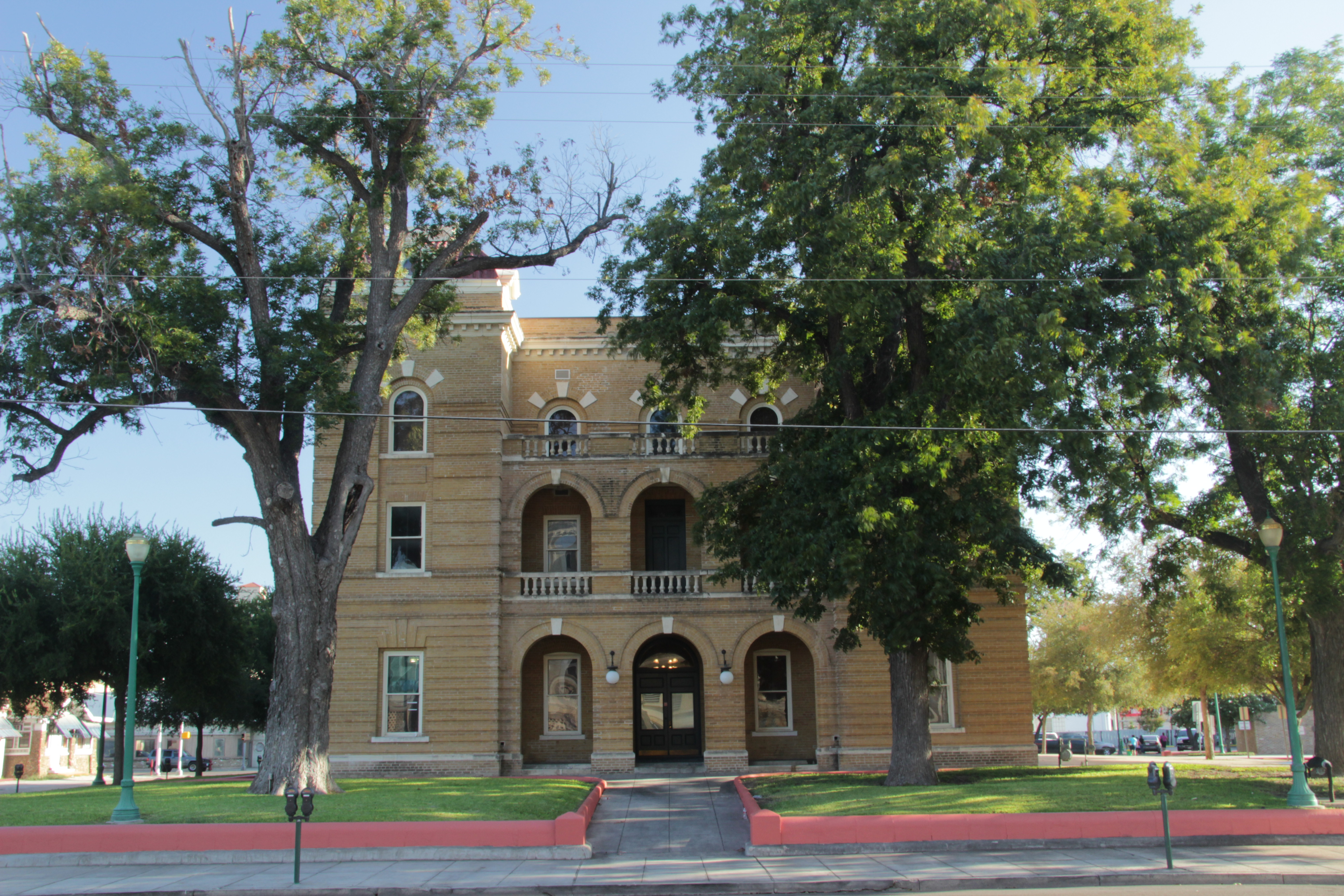
- Webb County Courthouse in Laredo

- Seal
- Interactive map of Webb County
- Location within the U.S. state of Texas
- Country: United States
- State: Texas
- Established: January 28, 1848
- Organized: March 16, 1848
- Named for: James Webb
- County seat: Laredo
- Largest city: Laredo

Government
  - Type: Commissioners Court

Area
  - Total: 3,375 sq mi (8,740 km^{2})
  - Land: 3,361 sq mi (8,700 km^{2})
  - Water: 14 sq mi (36 km^{2}) 0.4%

Population (2020)
  - Total: 267,114
  - Estimate (2025): 281,224 ▲
  - Density: 79.47/sq mi (30.69/km^{2})
- Time zone: UTC−6 (Central)
  - Summer (DST): UTC−5 (CDT)
- Area code: 956
- FIPS code: 48479
- GNIS feature ID: 1384025
- Website: www.webbcountytx.gov

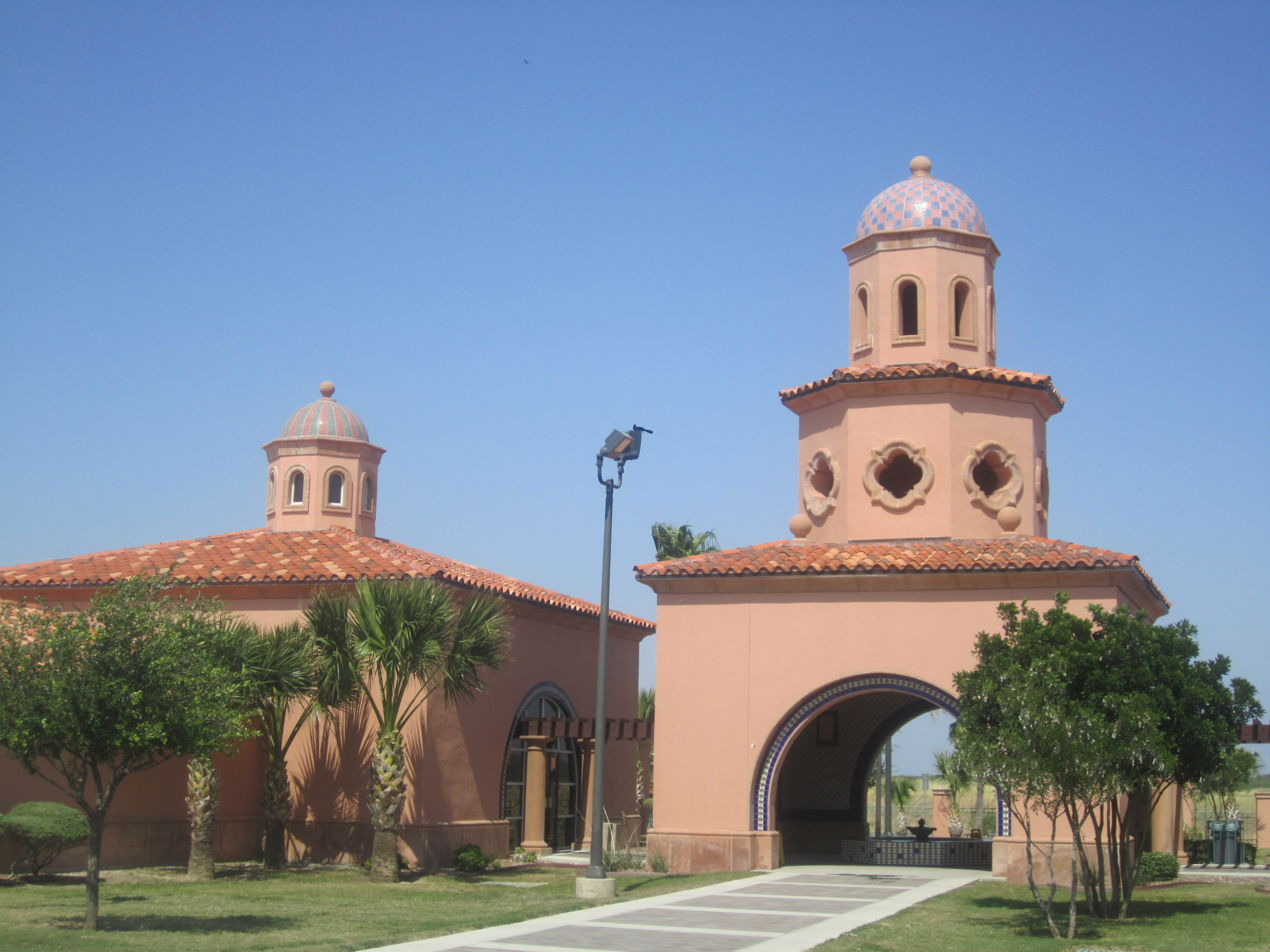
The Texas tourism travel station is located at the intersection of Interstate 35 and U.S. Route 83 north of Laredo.

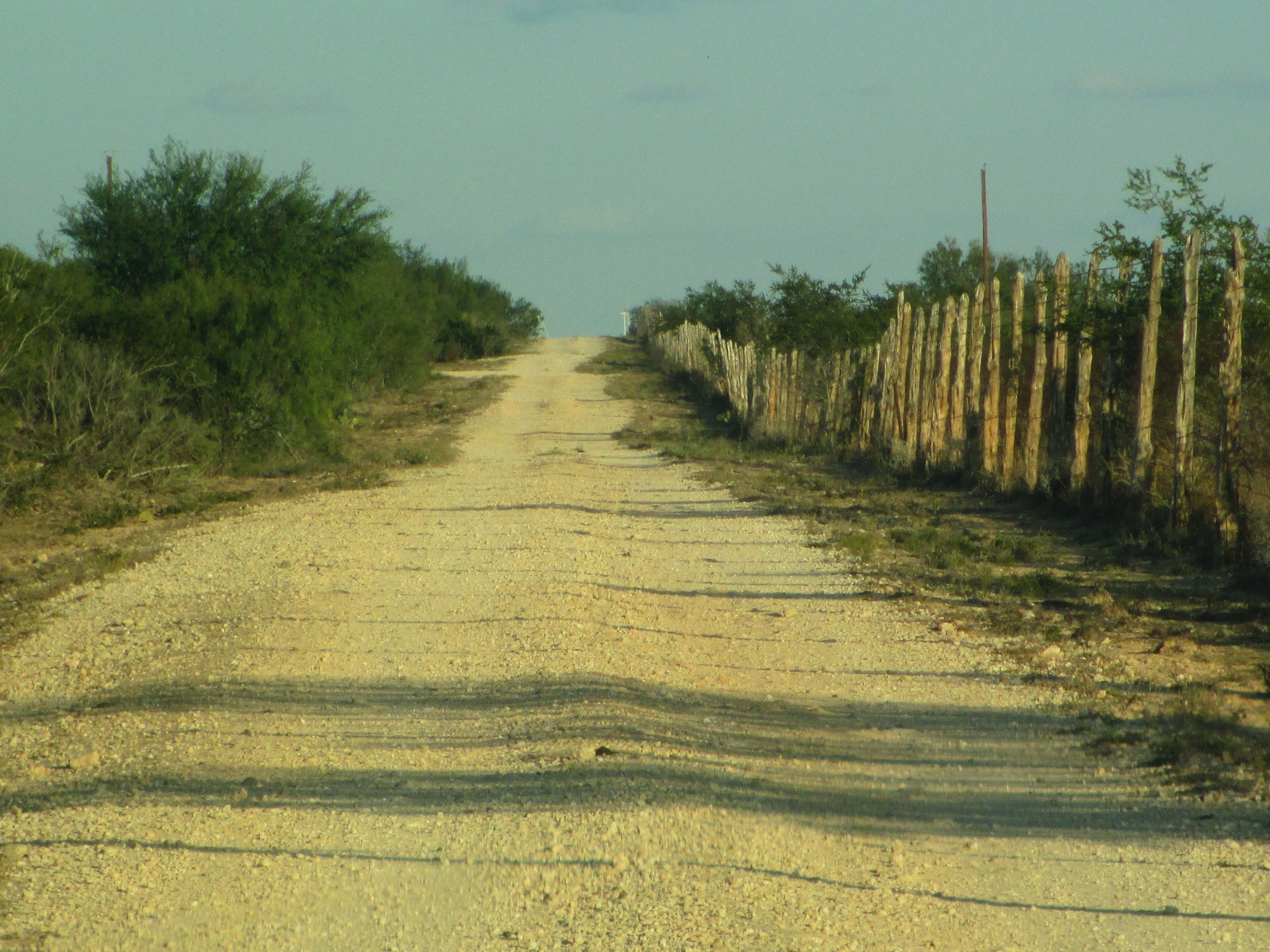
Typical Webb County ranch road north of Texas State Highway 359 (2012)

Webb County is a county located in the U.S. state of Texas. As of the 2020 census, its population was 267,114. Its county seat and largest city is Laredo. The county was named after James Webb (1792–1856), who served as secretary of the treasury, secretary of state, and attorney general of the Republic of Texas, and later judge of the United States District Court following the admission of Texas to statehood. By area, Webb County is the largest county in South Texas, the largest county in Texas outside of the Trans-Pecos region, and the sixth-largest in the state. Webb County comprises the Laredo metropolitan area. Webb County is the only county in the United States to border three foreign states or provinces, sharing borders with Coahuila, Nuevo Leon, and Tamaulipas.

Webb County has a minority majority, with 95.2% of the population of the county identifying as Hispanic. This makes Webb the county with the second-highest proportion of Hispanic people in the continental United States after Starr County, and it has the highest proportion of Hispanic people among counties with a population over 100,000.

== History ==
Webb County was split in 1856. Encinal County was established on February 1, 1856, and was to have consisted of the eastern portion of Webb County. However, Encinal County was never organized and was finally dissolved on March 12, 1899, with its territory returned as part of Webb County.

Much of Webb County history is based on the prevalence of ranching in the 19th century and continuing thereafter. The Webb County Heritage Foundation is a nonprofit organization that seeks to preserve documents and artifacts of the past to guarantee that the regional history is not lost to upcoming generations. In 2015, the foundation, headed by President James E. Moore, presented Heritage Awards to such local notables as the artist Janet Krueger, journalist Maria Eugenia Guerra, and Laredo Community College art instructor Martha F. Fenstermaker (1943-2014).

== Geography ==
According to the U.S. Census Bureau, the county has a total area of 3,376 square miles (8,740 km^{2}), of which 3,361 square miles (8,700 km^{2}) are land and 14 square miles (36 km^{2}) (0.4%) are covered by water.

=== Major highways ===
The Webb County–City of Laredo Regional Mobility Authority has responsibility for a comprehensive transport system in the region.

- Future I-2
- Future I-27
- I-35
  - I-35 BS (Laredo)
  - I-35 BL (Encinal)
- I-69W / US 59
  - Bus. US 59 (Laredo)
- US 83
- SH 44
- SH 84
- SH 255
- SH 359
- Loop 20
- Spur 259
- Spur 260
- Spur 400

=== Adjacent counties and municipalities ===
- Dimmit County (north)
- La Salle County (north)
- Duval County (east)
- Jim Hogg County (southeast)
- Zapata County (south)
- Maverick County (northwest)
- McMullen County, Texas (northeast)
- Guerrero, Coahuila, Mexico (west)
- Hidalgo, Coahuila, Mexico (west)
- Anáhuac, Nuevo León, Mexico (west)
- Nuevo Laredo, Tamaulipas, Mexico (south)
- Guerrero, Tamaulipas, Mexico (southwest)

== Demographics ==
=== Racial and ethnic composition ===
Historical population
Census	Pop.	Note	%±
1860	1,397		—
1870	2,615		87.2%
1880	5,273		101.6%
1890	14,842		181.5%
1900	21,851		47.2%
1910	22,503		3.0%
1920	29,152		29.5%
1930	42,128		44.5%
1940	45,916		9.0%
1950	56,141		22.3%
1960	64,791		15.4%
1970	72,859		12.5%
1980	99,258		36.2%
1990	133,239		34.2%
2000	193,117		44.9%
2010	250,304		29.6%
2020	267,114		6.7%
2025 (est.)	281,224	▲	5.3%
U.S. Decennial Census; 1850–2010 2010 2020

Webb County, Texas – Racial and ethnic composition Note: the US Census treats Hispanic/Latino as an ethnic category. This table excludes Latinos from the racial categories and assigns them to a separate category. Hispanics/Latinos may be of any race.
Race / Ethnicity (NH = Non-Hispanic)	Pop 1980	Pop 1990	Pop 2000	Pop 2010	Pop 2020	% 1980	% 1990	% 2000	% 2010	% 2020
White alone (NH)	8,124	7,427	9,508	8,345	9,495	8.18%	5.57%	4.92%	3.33%	3.55%
Black or African American alone (NH)	75	68	294	487	788	0.08%	0.05%	0.15%	0.19%	0.30%
Native American or Alaska Native alone (NH)	111	44	144	95	135	0.11%	0.03%	0.07%	0.04%	0.05%
Asian alone (NH)	94	397	783	1,320	1,300	0.09%	0.30%	0.41%	0.53%	0.49%
Native Hawaiian or Pacific Islander alone (NH)	x	x	16	11	25	x	x	0.01%	0.00%	0.01%
Other race alone (NH)	12	234	22	130	458	0.01%	0.18%	0.01%	0.05%	0.17%
Multiracial (NH)	x	x	280	263	559	x	x	0.14%	0.11%	0.21%
Hispanic or Latino (any race)	90,842	125,069	182,070	239,653	254,354	91.52%	93.87%	94.28%	95.74%	95.22%
Total	99,258	133,239	193,117	250,304	267,114	100.00%	100.00%	100.00%	100.00%	100.00%

=== 2020 census ===
As of the 2020 census, the county had a population of 267,114. The median age was 30.6 years; 30.2% of residents were under 18 and 10.4% were 65 or older. For every 100 females, there were 94.7 males, and for every 100 females 18 and over, there were 91.3 males 18 and over.

The racial makeup of the county was 38.5% White, 0.4% Black or African American, 0.6% American Indian and Alaska Native, 0.5% Asian, <0.1% Native Hawaiian and Pacific Islander, 19.7% from some other race, and 40.2% from two or more races. Hispanic or Latino residents of any race comprised 95.2% of the population.

About 94.1% of residents lived in urban areas, while 5.9% lived in rural areas.

Of the 78,282 households in the county, 48.7% had children under 18 living in them. Of all households, 50.5% were married-couple households, 15.4% were households with a male householder and no spouse or partner present, and 28.7% were households with a female householder and no spouse or partner present. About 16.2% of all households were made up of individuals, and 6.2% had someone living alone who was 65 or older.

The county had 84,763 housing units, of which 7.6% were vacant. Among occupied housing units, 62.5% were owner-occupied and 37.5% were renter-occupied. The homeowner vacancy rate was 1.3% and the rental vacancy rate was 8.4%.

=== 2010 census ===
As of the 2010 census, the population was 250,304, an increase of roughly 57,000 from 2000.

=== 2000 census ===
As of the census of 2000, 193,117 people, 50,740 households, and 43,433 families resided in the county. The population density was 58 people/sq mi (22/km^{2}). The 55,206 housing units averaged 16/sq mi (6/km^{2}). The racial makeup of the county was 82.16% White, 0.37% Black or African American, 0.47% Native American, 0.43% Asian, 14.02% from other races, and 2.54% from two or more races. About 94% of the population was Hispanic or Latino of any race.

Of the 50,740 households, 53.2% had children under 18 living with them, 62.6% were married couples living together, 18.3% had a female householder with no husband present, and 14.4% were not families; 12.4% of all households were made up of individuals, and 5.1% had someone living alone who was 65 or older. The average household size was 3.75, and the average family size was 4.10.

In the county, the age distribution was 36.2% under 18, 11.4% from 18 to 24, 29.3% from 25 to 44, 15.6% from 45 to 64, and 7.6% who were 65 or older. The median age was 26 years. For every 100 females, there were 92.90 males. For every 100 females age 18 and over, there were 87.9 males.

The median income in the county for a household was $28,100 and for a family was $29,394. Males had a median income of $23,618 versus $19,018 for females. The per capita income for the county was $10,759. About 26.7% of families and 31.20% of the population were below the poverty line, including 39.4% of those under 18 and 26.9% of those 65 or over.

== Politics ==
United States presidential election results for Webb County, Texas
Year	Republican		Democratic		Third party(ies)	
Year	No.	%	No.	%	No.	%
1912	888	56.31%	654	41.47%	35	2.22%
1916	472	41.11%	676	58.89%	0	0.00%
1920	468	41.90%	633	56.67%	16	1.43%
1924	429	23.91%	1,313	73.19%	52	2.90%
1928	767	32.16%	1,615	67.71%	3	0.13%
1932	657	13.22%	4,299	86.52%	13	0.26%
1936	696	16.22%	3,594	83.78%	0	0.00%
1940	775	15.73%	4,147	84.19%	4	0.08%
1944	776	13.93%	4,742	85.12%	53	0.95%
1948	1,004	17.63%	4,595	80.68%	96	1.69%
1952	2,784	30.95%	6,208	69.01%	4	0.04%
1956	2,744	31.96%	5,827	67.86%	16	0.19%
1960	1,802	15.19%	10,059	84.78%	4	0.03%
1964	1,094	9.78%	10,073	90.08%	15	0.13%
1968	2,103	17.78%	9,419	79.65%	304	2.57%
1972	6,011	41.58%	8,435	58.34%	12	0.08%
1976	4,222	28.72%	10,362	70.50%	114	0.78%
1980	5,421	30.81%	11,856	67.39%	316	1.80%
1984	8,582	40.99%	12,308	58.79%	46	0.22%
1988	7,528	31.59%	16,227	68.09%	77	0.32%
1992	7,789	31.32%	14,509	58.35%	2,568	10.33%
1996	4,712	19.02%	18,997	76.67%	1,068	4.31%
2000	13,076	41.42%	18,120	57.39%	375	1.19%
2004	17,753	42.72%	23,654	56.92%	149	0.36%
2008	13,119	28.02%	33,452	71.45%	250	0.53%
2012	11,078	22.52%	37,597	76.42%	521	1.06%
2016	12,947	22.48%	42,307	73.47%	2,331	4.05%
2020	25,904	37.80%	41,842	61.05%	788	1.15%
2024	33,384	50.69%	31,952	48.51%	529	0.80%

United States Senate election results for Webb County, Texas1
Year	Republican		Democratic		Third party(ies)	
Year	No.	%	No.	%	No.	%
2024	28,121	44.15%	33,758	53.00%	1,820	2.86%

United States Senate election results for Webb County, Texas2
Year	Republican		Democratic		Third party(ies)	
Year	No.	%	No.	%	No.	%
2020	23,153	34.87%	40,822	61.49%	2,418	3.64%

Texas Gubernatorial election results for Webb County
Year	Republican		Democratic		Third party(ies)	
Year	No.	%	No.	%	No.	%
2022	16,409	36.70%	27,156	60.73%	1,151	2.57%

Webb County was a longtime Democratic stronghold. However, since 2016, Webb County has been trending more towards the Republican Party due to Donald Trump attracting more Hispanic voters. This mirrors the same trend seen in other counties in South Texas. In 2024, the county flipped Republican by a slim majority, the first time it had done so since 1912. Webb was Biden's best county in 2020 of the counties that flipped to Trump in 2024 by margin; the county went from voting for Biden by 23% to voting for Trump by 2%. Overall, Webb County shifted to the right from 2012 to 2024 by 56 percentage points, representing one of the strongest such rightward shifts for any county in the country.

== Education ==
Three school districts serve Webb County:

- Laredo Independent School District
- United Independent School District
- Webb Consolidated Independent School District

Prior to 1994, Webb CISD served only Bruni and Oilton. Mirando City Independent School District served the community of Mirando City from 1923 to 2005. Prior to 1994, all Mirando City children attended Mirando City ISD schools. After the spring of 1994, Mirando City High School closed. Therefore, from the fall of 1994 to July 1, 2005, WCISD served high schoolers from Mirando City, while Mirando Elementary School in the Mirando City ISD served pupils from kindergarten through eighth grade. On May 9, 2005, the Texas Education Agency ordered the closure of Mirando City ISD. The district closed on July 1, 2005, and all students were rezoned to Webb CISD schools.

The private Holding Institute is a former United Methodist boarding school operating as a downtown Laredo community center.

All residents are zoned to Laredo College.

== Communities ==
=== Cities ===
- El Cenizo
- Laredo (county seat)
- Rio Bravo

=== Census-designated places ===
- Aguilares
- Bonanza Hills
- Botines
- Bruni
- Colorado Acres
- Four Points
- Hillside Acres
- La Coma
- La Moca Ranch
- La Presa
- Laredo Ranchettes
- Laredo Ranchettes West
- Las Haciendas
- Las Pilas
- Los Altos
- Los Arcos
- Los Centenarios
- Los Corralitos
- Los Fresnos
- Los Huisaches
- Los Minerales
- Los Nopalitos
- Los Veteranos I
- Los Veteranos II
- Mirando City
- Oilton
- Pueblo East
- Pueblo Nuevo
- Ranchitos East
- Ranchitos Las Lomas
- Ranchos Penitas West
- San Carlos I
- San Carlos II
- Sunset Acres
- Tanquecitos South Acres
- Tanquecitos South Acres II
- Valle Verde

=== Former census designated places ===
- Larga Vista

=== Other unincorporated communities ===
- Callaghan
- Las Tiendas
- Webb

=== Ghost towns ===
- Darwin
- Islitas
- Los Ojuelos
- Pescadito
- Santo Tomas

=== Planned community ===
- Talise

== Gallery ==
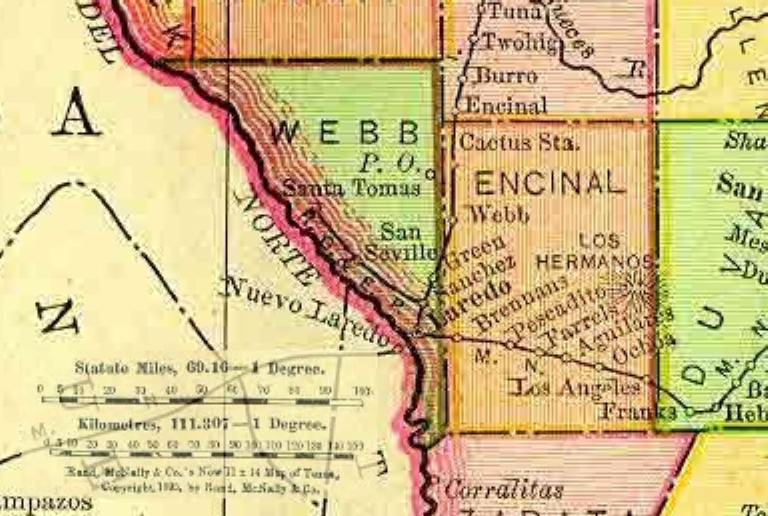
Map of Webb and Encinal Counties in 1895

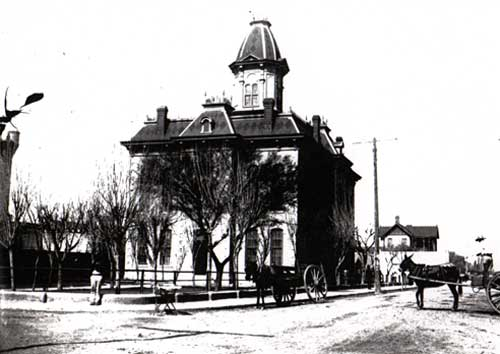
Webb County Courthouse in 1905

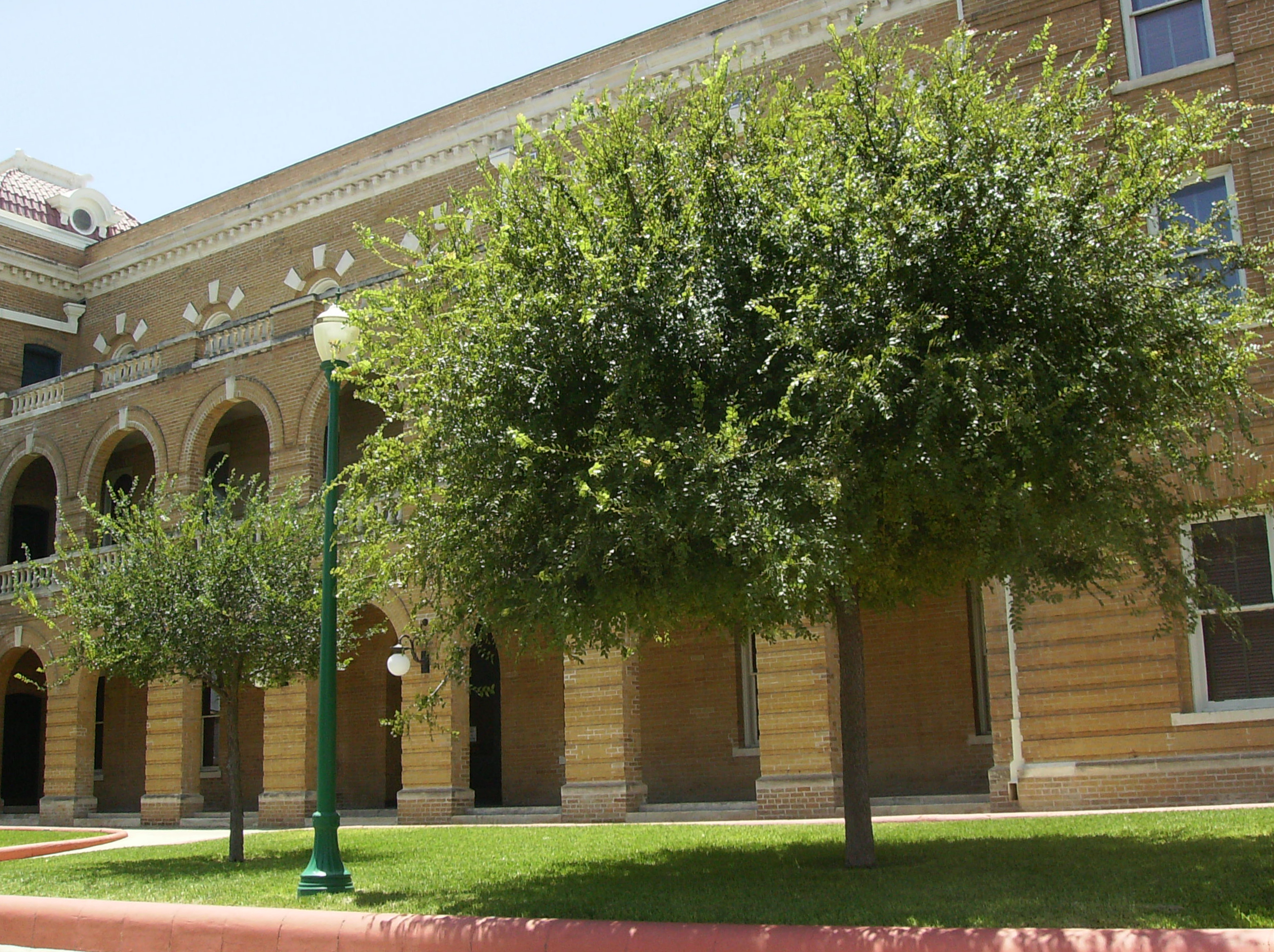
Webb County Courthouse today

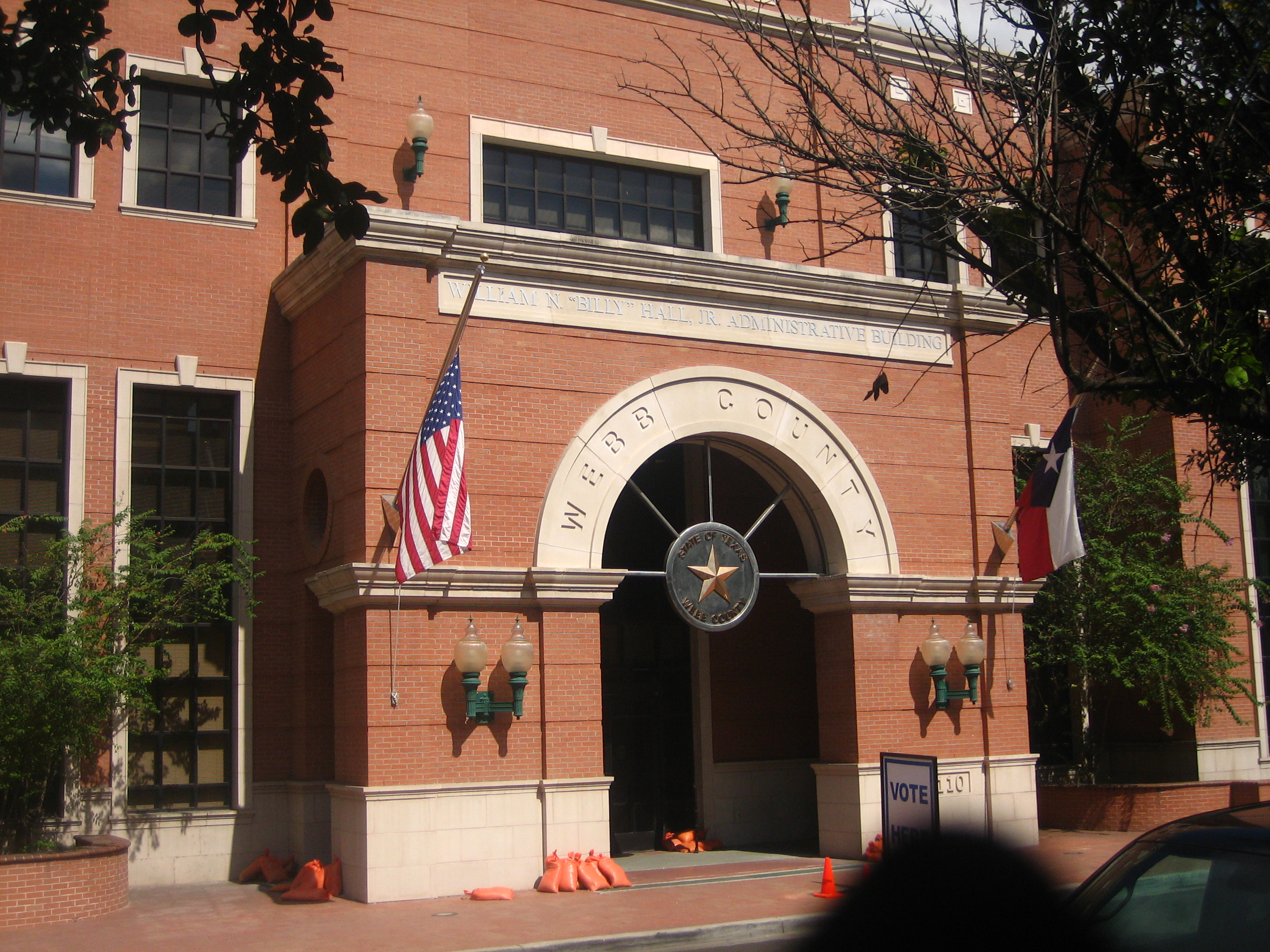
Entrance to the William N. "Billy" Hall Administrative Building annex of the Webb County Courthouse in Laredo

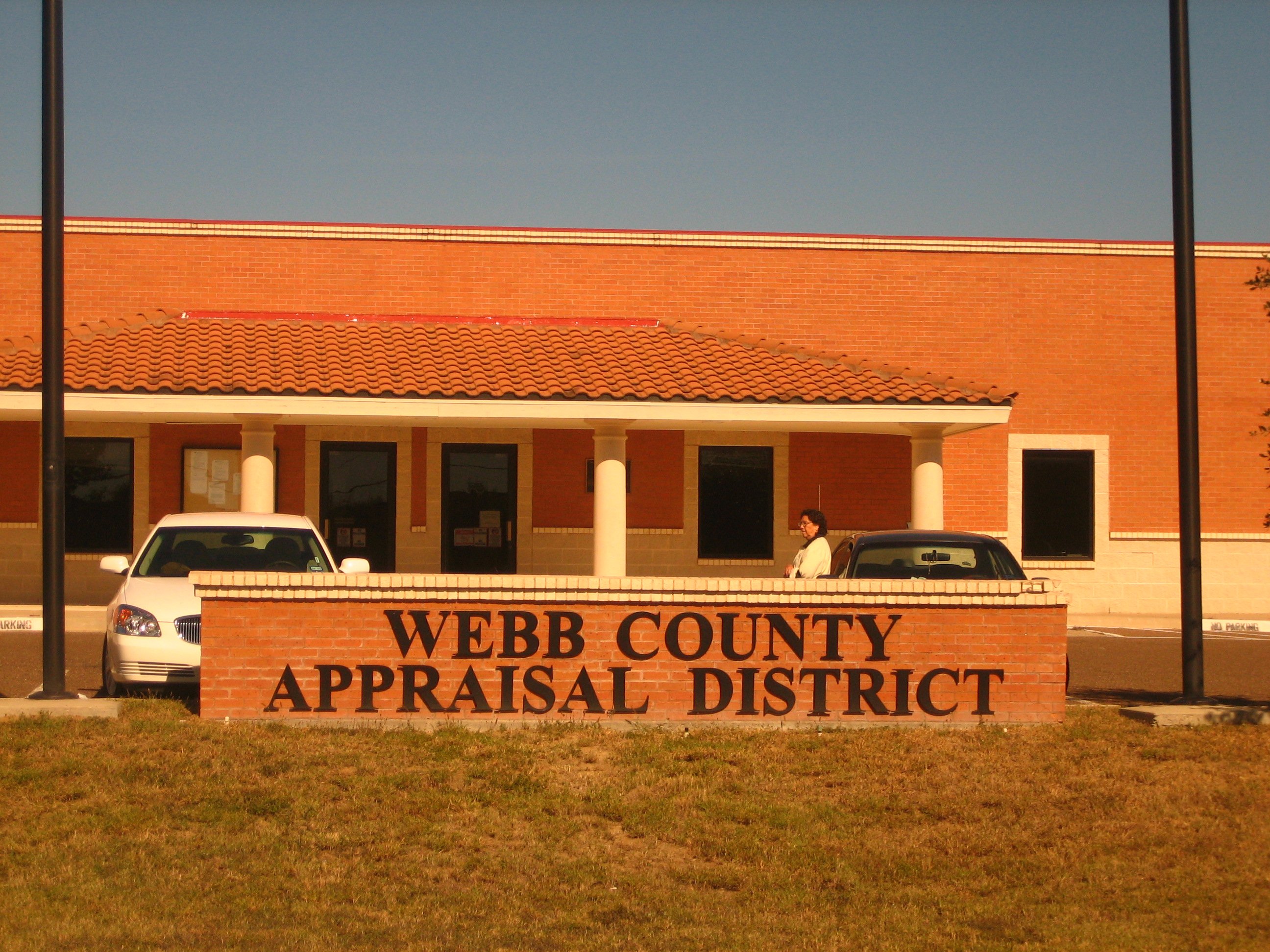
The Webb County Appraisal District Office in Laredo appraises taxable real property for municipal and county governments, Laredo Community College, and both public school districts.

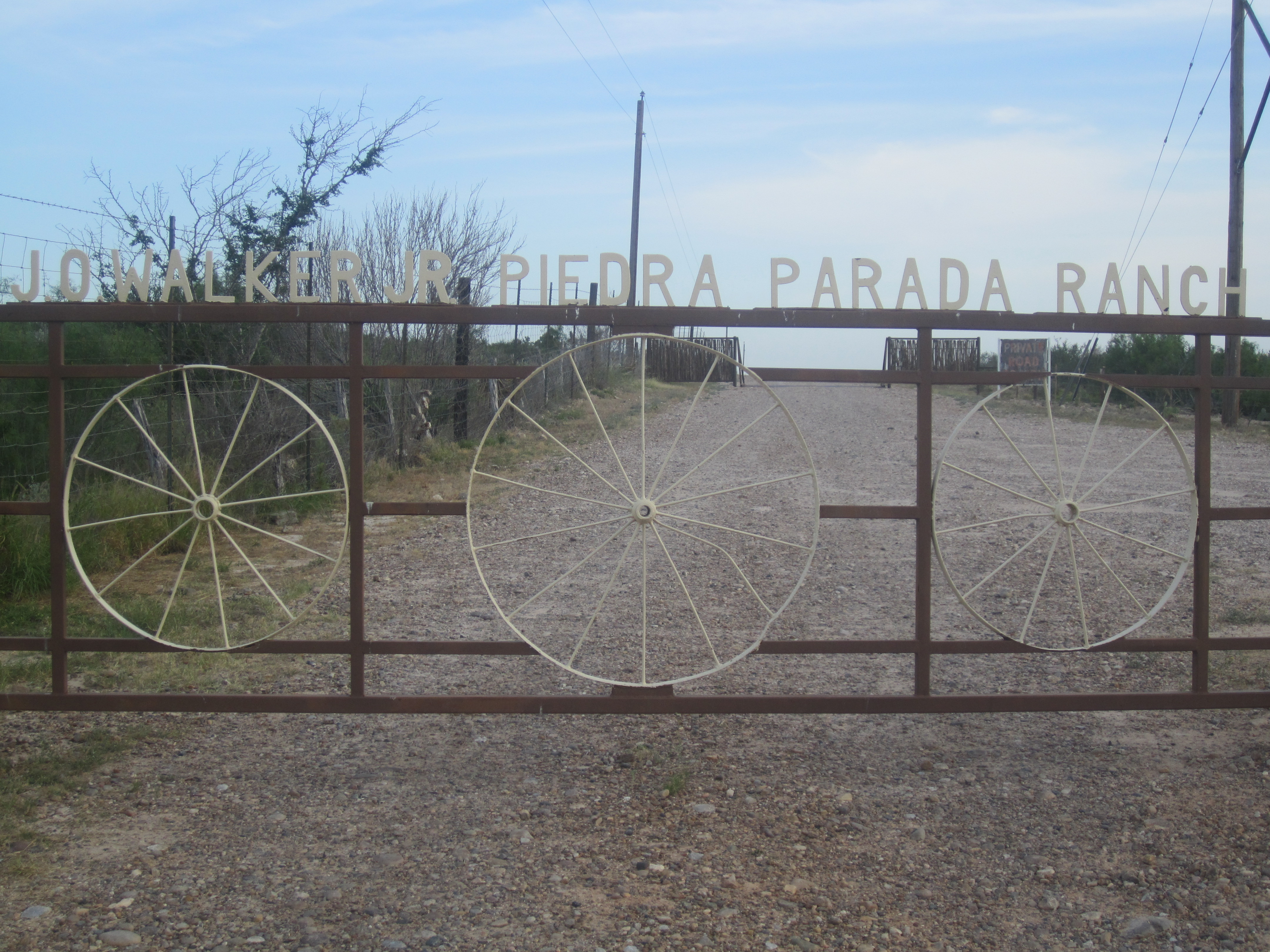
Entrance to the J. O. Walker, Jr., Piedra Parada Ranch in eastern Webb County

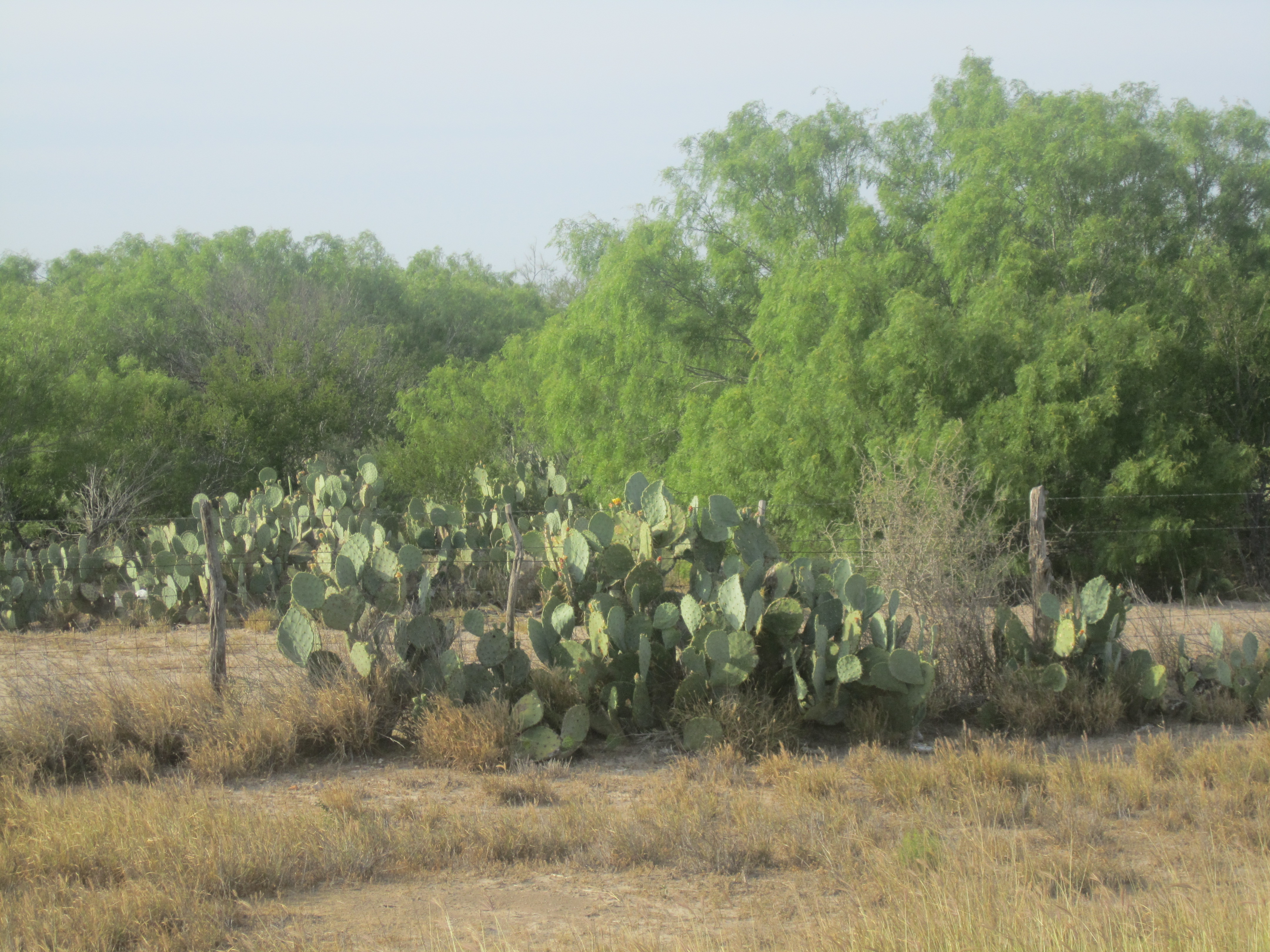
Opuntia cacti abound throughout much of Webb County.

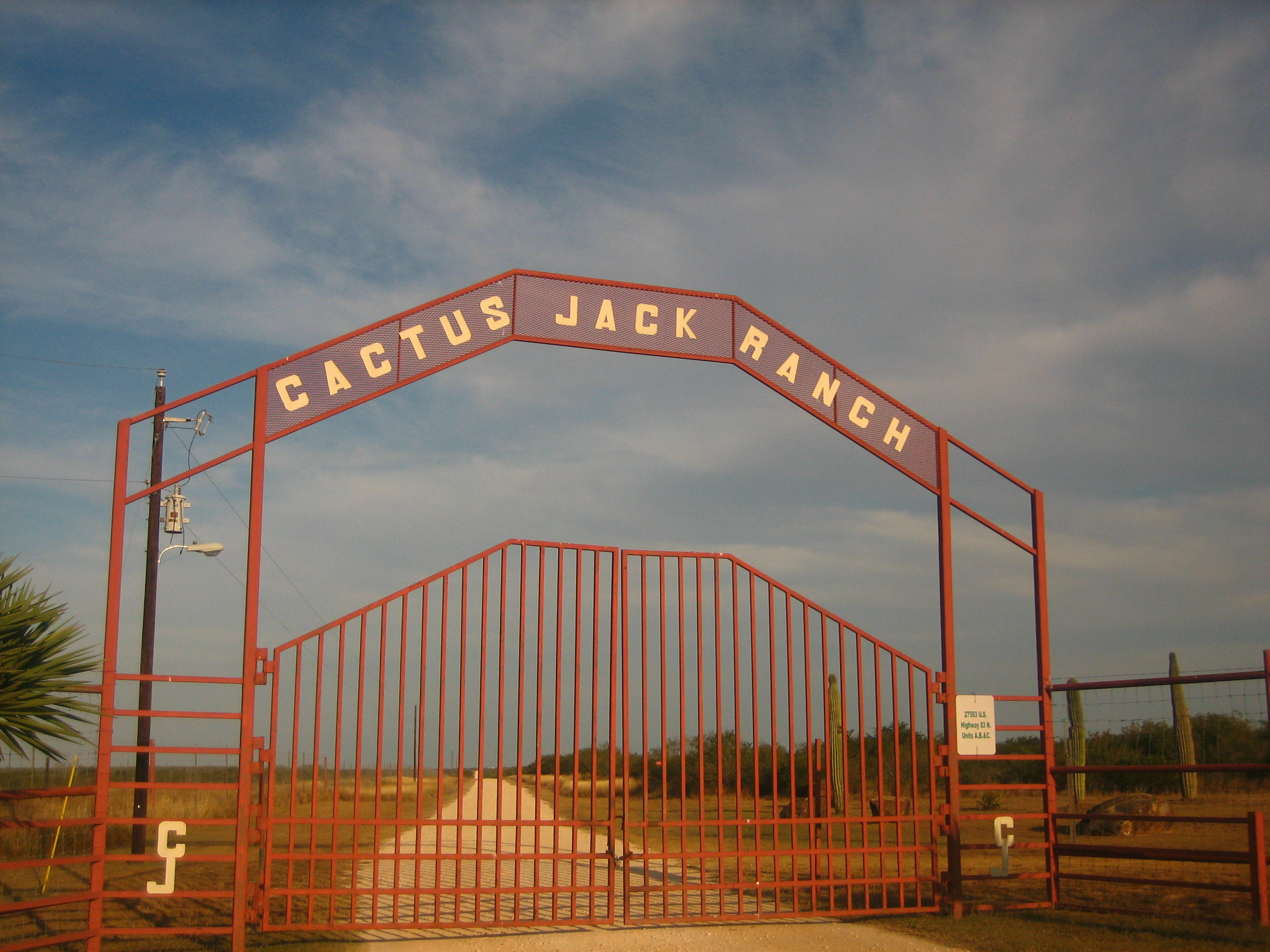
The Cactus Jack Ranch in northwestern Webb County is named for U.S. President Franklin D. Roosevelt's first vice president, John Nance Garner of Uvalde. Imported saguaro cacti are planted at the gate.

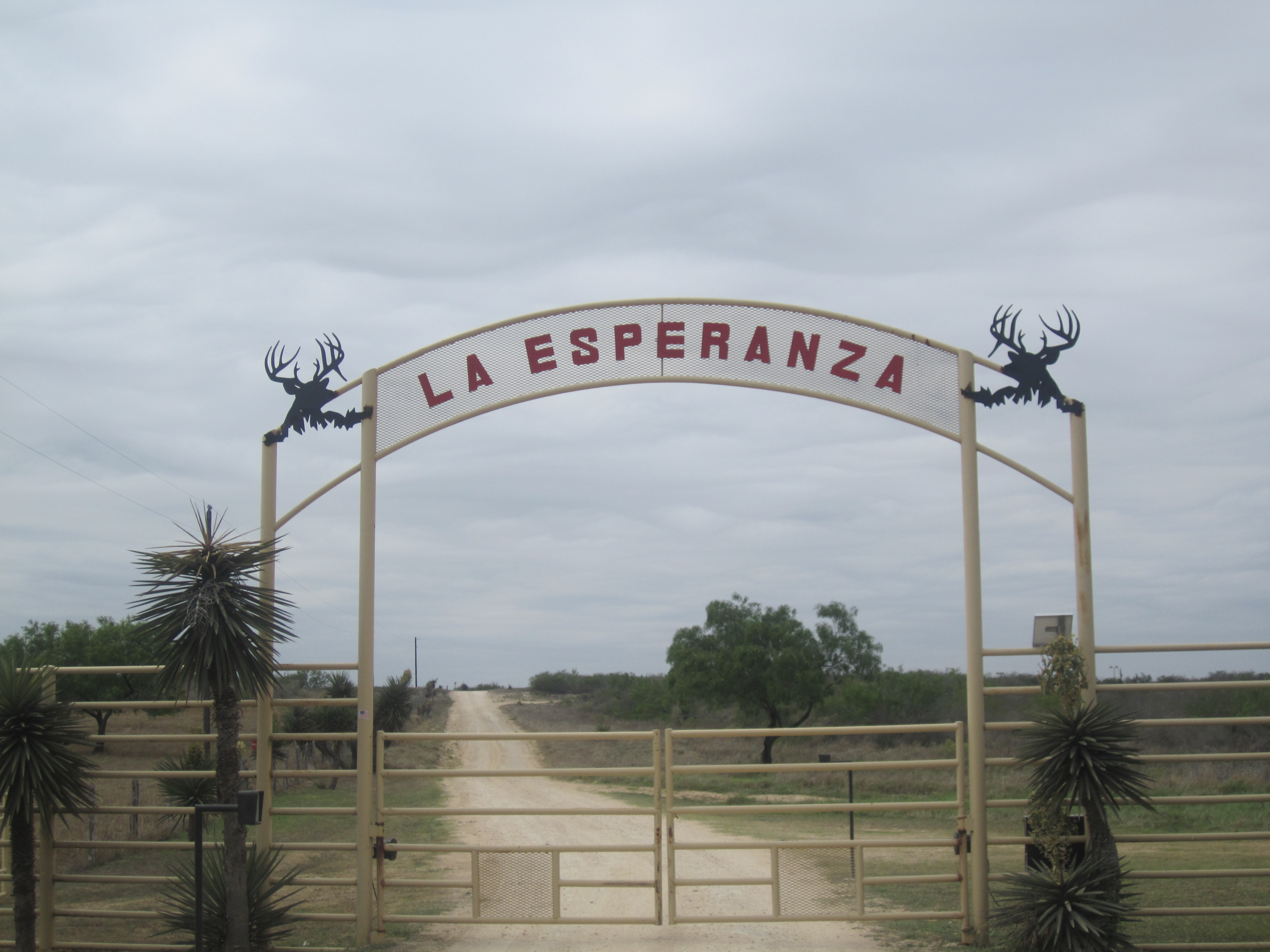
Entrance gate to La Esperanza (Hope) Ranch in northwestern Webb County near the Dimmit County boundary

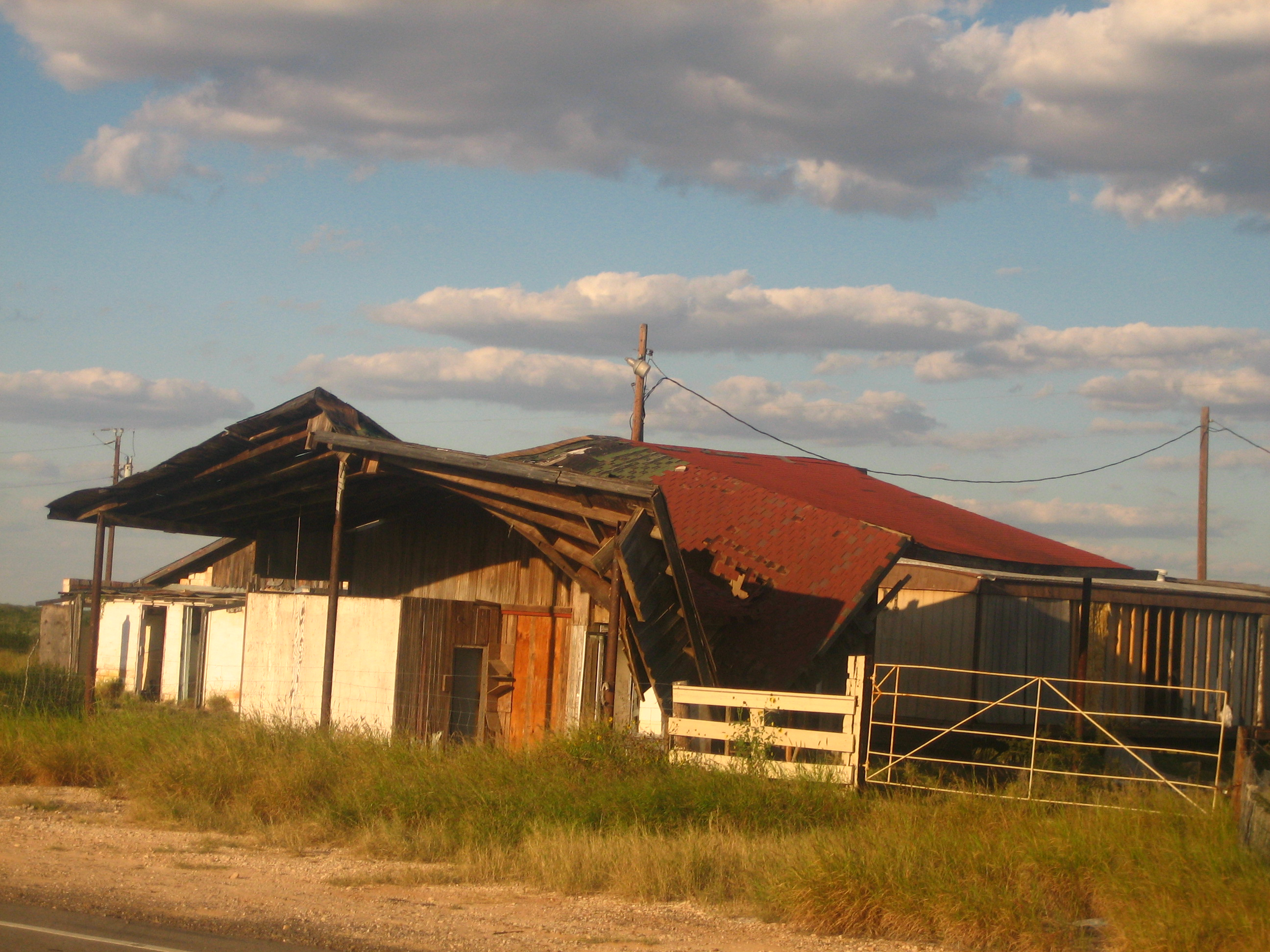
This abandoned building along U.S. Route 83 in northwestern Webb County reflects the isolation of the South Texas ranch country.

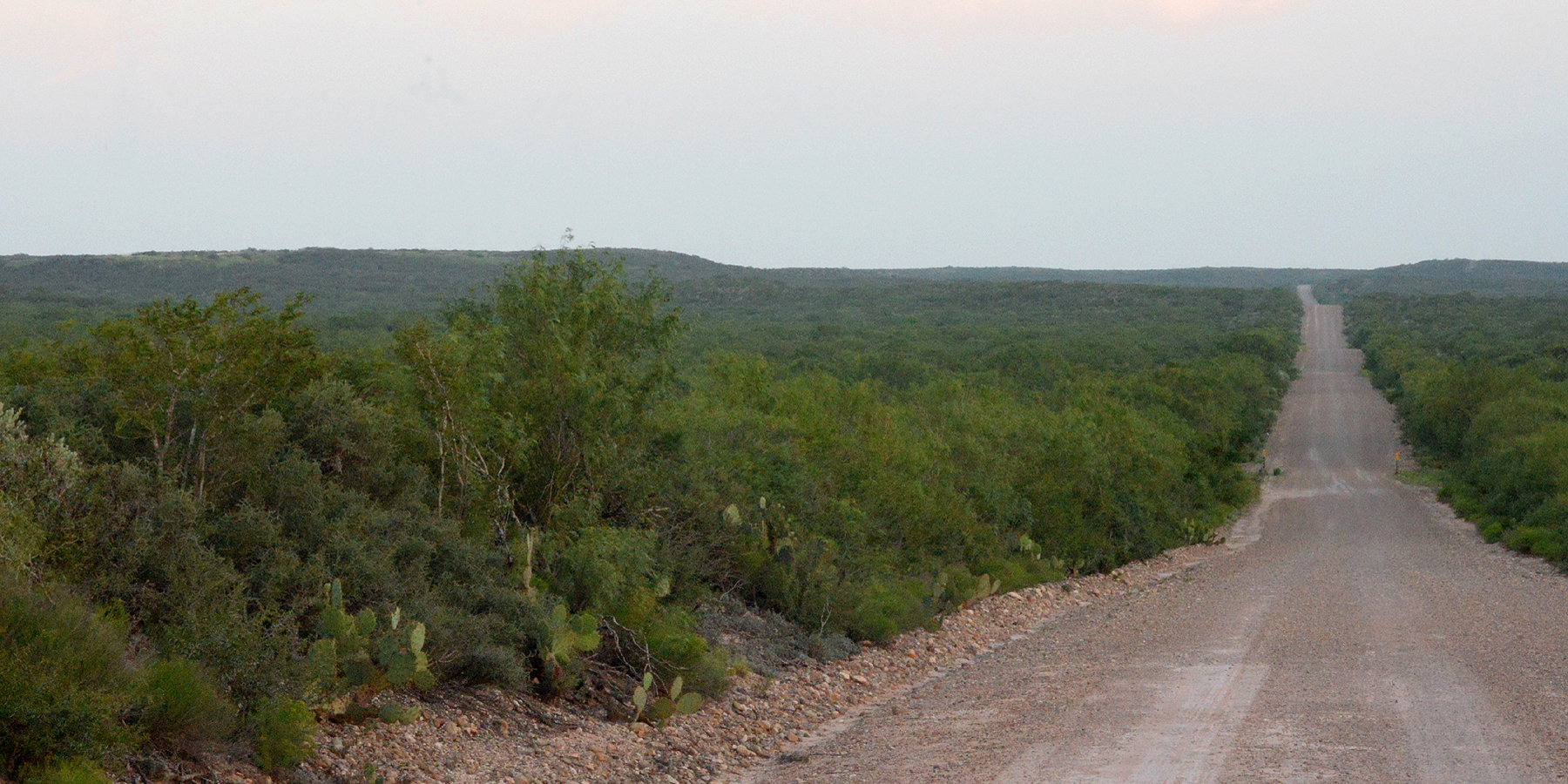
Road through Tamaulipan thornscrub, Webb County, Texas, USA (10 June 2016)

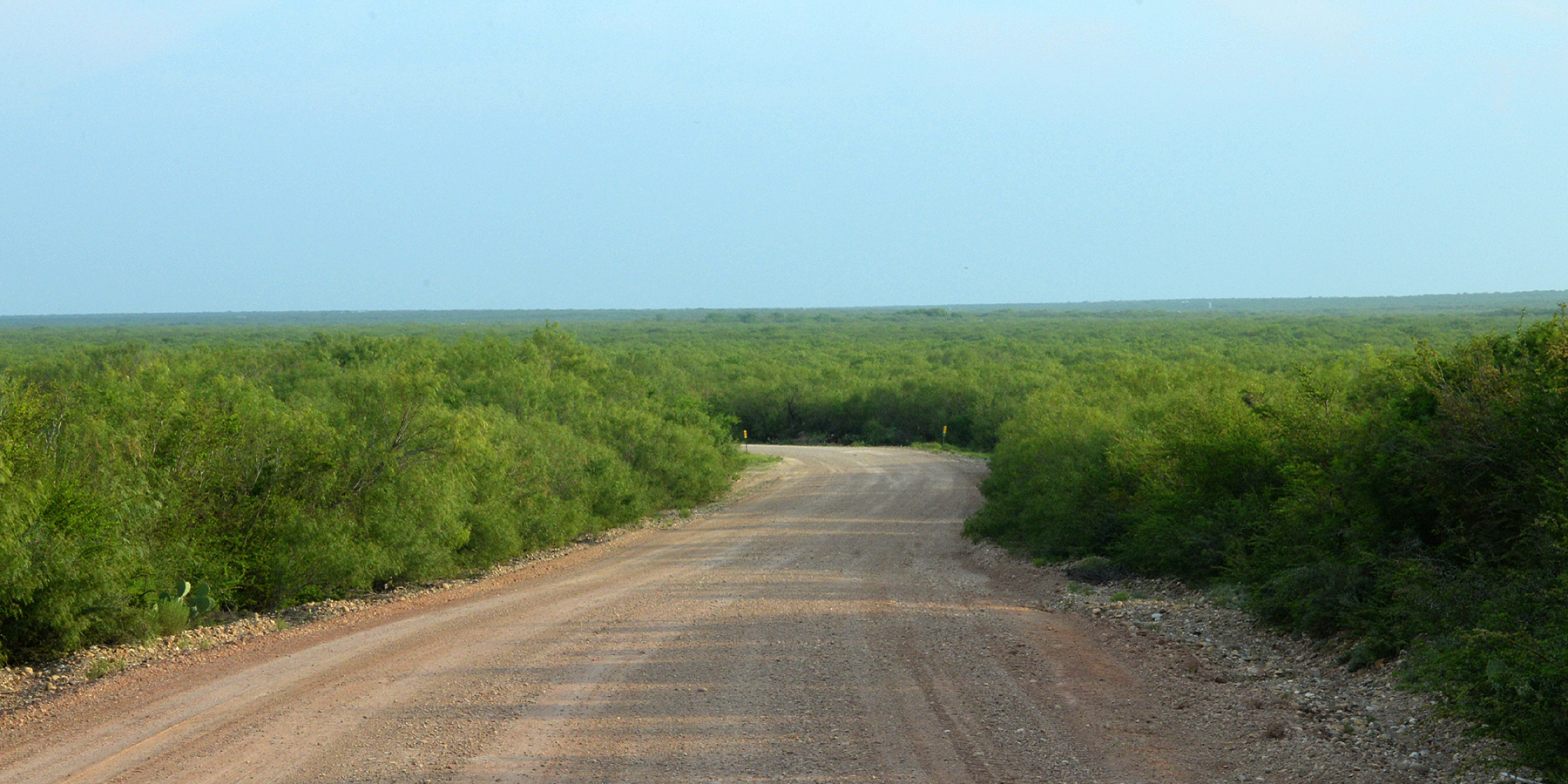
Road through Tamaulipan thornscrub, Webb County, Texas, USA (10 June 2016)

== See also ==
- List of museums in South Texas
- National Register of Historic Places listings in Webb County, Texas
- Recorded Texas Historic Landmarks in Webb County
- Webb County Courthouse
