= Miss USA 1986 =

- Date: May 20, 1986
- Presenters: Bob Barker; Mary Frann
- Venue: Miami, Florida
- Broadcaster: CBS
- Entrants: 51
- Placements: 10
- Winner: Christy Fichtner; Texas

Miss USA 1986 was the 35th Miss USA pageant, televised live from Miami, Florida, on May 20, 1986, co-hosted by Bob Barker and Mary Frann with musical guests Eddie Rabbitt and Tommy Tune. Maureen O'Sullivan recites a portion of the Emma Lazarus sonnet The New Colossus to commemorate the centennial of the Statue of Liberty.

The pageant was won by Christy Fichtner of Texas, who was crowned by outgoing titleholder Laura Harring of Texas. Future Oscar-winning actress Halle Berry from Ohio was first runner-up.

== Results ==
Final results	Contestant
Miss USA 1986	Texas – Christy Fichtner
1st Runner-Up	Ohio – Halle Berry
2nd Runner-Up	(Georgia (U.S. state)) Georgia – Tami Tesch
3rd Runner-Up	Mississippi – Cindy Williams
4th Runner-Up	California – Kelly Parsons
Top 10	Illinois – Tricia Bach; North Carolina – Rhonda Nobles; Oklahoma – Teresa Lucas; South Carolina – Maribeth Curry; Wyoming – Beth King

== Delegates ==
The Miss USA 1986 delegates were:

- Alabama – Heather Howard
- Alaska – Kim Christopher-Taylor
- Arizona – Jodie Lee Armstrong
- Arkansas – Rhonda Blaylock
- California - Kelly Parsons
- Colorado – Cheryl Rohleder
- Connecticut – Jennifer Benusis
- Delaware – Lynne Taylor
- (Washington, D.C.) District of Columbia – Desiree Keating
- Florida – Kathy Rosenwinkel
- (Georgia (U.S. state)) Georgia – Tami Tesch
- Hawaii – Toni Costa
- Idaho – Kelly Catron
- Illinois – Tricia Bach
- Indiana – Diane Andrysiak
- Iowa – Holly Wilkins
- Kansas – Audra Ockerman
- Kentucky – Jackie Taylor
- Louisiana – Cecilia Brady
- Maine – Annette Lewis
- Maryland – Kelly Koehler
- Massachusetts – Sheila Benson
- Michigan – Lisa Bernardi
- Minnesota – Cynthia Peterson
- Mississippi – Cindy Williams
- Missouri – Barbara Webster
- Montana – Laurie Ryan
- Nebraska – Ellen Withrow
- Nevada – LeAnna Grant
- New Hampshire – Lynda Poulin
- New Jersey – Lisa Summerour-Perry
- New Mexico – Heather Howell
- (New York (state)) New York – Beth Laufer
- North Carolina – Rhonda Nobles
- North Dakota – Beth Ann Remmick
- Ohio – Halle Berry
- Oklahoma – Teresa Lucas
- Oregon – Kimberly Stubblefield
- Pennsylvania – Sherri Fitzpatrick
- Rhode Island – Donna Silva
- South Carolina – Maribeth Curry
- South Dakota – Lori Schumacher
- Tennessee – Karen Compton
- Texas – Christy Fichtner
- Utah – Stephanie Reber
- Vermont – Tracey Morton
- Virginia – Maureen McDonnell
- (Washington (state)) Washington – Jacqueline McMahon
- West Virginia – Shonna Lyons
- Wisconsin – Bonnie Bonnicksen
- Wyoming – Beth King

== Judges ==
- John Bolger – actor
- John Callahan – actor
- Carol Connors – singer
- René Enríquez - actor
- Christopher Hewett – actor
- Maria Remenyi – Miss USA 1966 from California
- David Robinson – drummer with The Cars
- Mai Shanley – Miss USA 1984 from New Mexico
- Miriam Stevenson – actress and Miss USA 1954 from South Carolina
- Wayman Tisdale – NBA basketball player
- Kimberly Tomes – Miss USA 1977 from Texas
- Michael Young – actor
