= Barbara Peterson =

Miss USA 1976

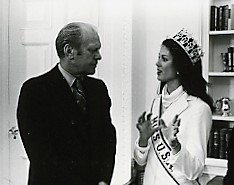
- US President Gerald Ford meets with Peterson in 1976
- Born: Barbara Elaine Peterson; November 25, 1953 (age 72); Edina, Minnesota, U.S.
- Other names: Barbara Burwell; Barbara Peterson-Burwell
- Education: St. Olaf College (BA)
- Spouse: Rodney P. Burwell (m. 1982; died 2015)
- Children: 3
- Father: C. Donald Peterson
- Relatives: P. Kenneth Peterson (uncle)
- Beauty pageant titleholder
- Title: Miss Minnesota USA 1976; Miss USA 1976
- Hair color: Brown
- Major competitions: Miss USA 1976 (Winner); Miss Universe 1976 (Unplaced)

Barbara Elaine Peterson Burwell (née Peterson; born November 25, 1953) is an American philanthropist and beauty pageant titleholder. After being crowned Miss Minnesota USA 1976, she competed at Miss USA 1976, becoming the first woman from Minnesota to win the title. Afterwards, she represented the United States at Miss Universe 1976, where she was unplaced.

As a philanthropist, Peterson is the president of the Burwell Family Foundation, based in Bloomington, Minnesota.

== Early life and education ==
Peterson was born in Edina, Minnesota to parents C. Donald Peterson and Gretchen Elaine Palen Peterson. Her family is of Swedish and German origin. Her father was an associate justice of the Minnesota Supreme Court, while her uncle was P. Kenneth Peterson, a former mayor of Minneapolis. Peterson was raised in Edina, and is one of six children; her four brothers and one sister include Todd Douglas, Scott Jeffrey, Craig Donald, Mark Bradley, and Polly Suzanne.

Peterson attended Edina High School (Edina East then), and later received a Bachelor of Arts degree from St. Olaf College in Northfield, Minnesota, with a triple major in political science, communications, and American studies.

== Pageantry ==
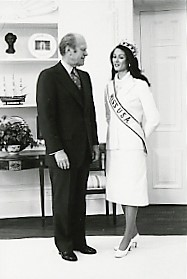
US President Gerald Ford meets with Peterson in 1976

Peterson had previously been crowned Queen of the Minneapolis Aquatennial and Miss Svenskarnas Dag, prior to competing in national pageantry. She later entered Miss Minnesota USA 1976, which she went on to win. As Miss Minnesota USA, Peterson was tasked with representing Minnesota at Miss USA 1976, held in Niagara Falls, New York. She advanced through the competition until ultimately being declared the winner, becoming the first woman from Minnesota to win the title.

After winning Miss USA, Peterson represented the United States at the Miss Universe 1976 pageant in Hong Kong. Her national costume was Uncle Sam. In the competition, Peterson became the first American competitor not to advance to the semifinals, which would not be repeated again until Kimberly Pressler represented the United States at Miss Universe 1999. Peterson later completed her reign as Miss USA after crowning Kimberly Tomes of Texas as Miss USA 1977, in Charleston, South Carolina on May 14, 1977.

In 1987, Peterson authored the book Becoming a Beauty Queen: the Complete Guide with her sister Polly Peterson Bowles, based on their experiences competing in pageantry. Peterson also served as a judge at the Miss USA 1990 competition.

== Personal life ==
Peterson was married to businessman Rodney P. Burwell until his death in 2015. They had three sons together: Rodney Peter, Blake Palmer, and Michael Craig. As a philanthropist, she and her husband made donations to educational and charitable institutions through the Burwell Family Foundation, which she serves as the president of. Peterson resides in the Minneapolis–Saint Paul area.
