= Los Veteranos =

Los Veteranos may refer to the following places in the United States:

- Los Veteranos I, Texas, census-designated place (CDP) in Webb County, Texas
- Los Veteranos II, Texas, census-designated place (CDP) in Webb County, Texas
