= Brenda Leithleiter =

American model (born 1968)

- Born: Brenda Leithleiter; Denver, Colorado, U.S.
- Beauty pageant titleholder
- Title: Miss Georgia USA 1990
- Major competition: Miss USA 1990 (Top 6)

Brenda Leithleiter Sharman (born 1968) is an American model and beauty pageant titleholder who has competed in the Miss USA 1990.

Leithleiter won the Miss Georgia USA 1990 title in November 1989. She went on to represent Georgia in the Miss USA 1990 pageant broadcast live from Wichita, Kansas on March 2, 1990. Leithleiter became the fifth consecutive delegate from her state to make the semi-finals, with the second highest average score in the preliminary competition. She went on to place eighth in the interview competition, eighth in evening gown and second in swimsuit, which gave her an average score of 9.036 that put her into the top six in sixth place. She eventually placed fifth overall in the nationally televised competition, which was won by Carole Gist of Michigan.

At some point after holding the Miss Georgia USA title and working for a time in the modeling industry Leithliter converted to Catholicism.

Leithleiter later married Steve Sharman, a top model in Georgia, and had three sons. She still lives in Georgia and is the National Spokesperson for a movement within the Catholic Church called Pure Fashion. Pure Fashion is a program that teaches teen girls, through fashion, how to re-discover and re-affirm their innate value and authentic femininity.
