= Botines, Texas =

Census-designated place in Webb County, Texas

- Census-designated place
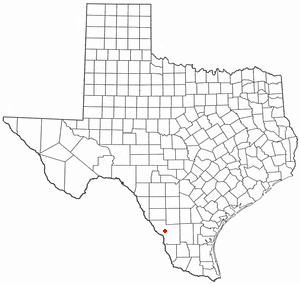
- Location of Botines, Texas
- Coordinates: 27°45′23″N 99°26′16″W
- Country: United States
- State: Texas
- County: Webb

Area
  - Total: 1.9 sq mi (4.9 km^{2})
  - Land: 1.9 sq mi (4.9 km^{2})
  - Water: 0 sq mi (0.0 km^{2})
- Elevation: 719 ft (219 m)

Population (2020)
  - Total: 149
  - Density: 78/sq mi (30/km^{2})
- Time zone: UTC-6 (Central (CST))
  - Summer (DST): UTC-5 (CDT)
- Zip Code: 78045
- FIPS code: 48-09598
- GNIS feature ID: 2407890

Botines is a census-designated place (CDP) in Webb County, Texas, United States. The population was 149 at the 2020 census. Botines is located 5 miles (8.0 km) north of Laredo. The town's name originates from the Spanish term botín, which means buskin, boot, or legging.

It is one of several colonias in the county.

== Geography ==
According to the United States Census Bureau in 2000, the CDP had a total area of 8.6 square miles (22.2 km^{2}), all land. This CDP lost area in the changes in Webb County prior to the 2010 census. Its total area was reduced to 1.9 square miles (4.9 km^{2}), as before, all land.

== Demographics ==
Historical population
Census	Pop.	Note	%±
2000	132		—
2010	117		−11.4%
2020	149		27.4%
U.S. Decennial Census; 1850–1900 1910; 1920 1930 1940; 1950 1960 1970; 1980 1990 2000; 2010

Botines first appeared as a census designated place in the 2000 U.S. census. Prior to the 2010 U.S. census, four CDPs (Bonanza Hills, Four Points, Los Veteranos II, and Sunset Acres) were in full or in part carved out of its territory.

=== 2020 census ===
Botines CDP, Texas – Racial and ethnic composition Note: the US Census treats Hispanic/Latino as an ethnic category. This table excludes Latinos from the racial categories and assigns them to a separate category. Hispanics/Latinos may be of any race.
Race / Ethnicity (NH = Non-Hispanic)	Pop 2000	Pop 2010	Pop 2020	% 2000	% 2010	% 2020
White alone (NH)	24	9	4	18.18%	7.69%	2.68%
Black or African American alone (NH)	0	1	0	0.00%	0.85%	0.00%
Native American or Alaska Native alone (NH)	0	0	0	0.00%	0.00%	0.00%
Asian alone (NH)	0	2	0	0.00%	1.71%	0.00%
Native Hawaiian or Pacific Islander alone (NH)	0	0	0	0.00%	0.00%	0.00%
Other race alone (NH)	0	0	0	0.00%	0.00%	0.00%
Mixed race or Multiracial (NH)	0	1	0	0.00%	0.85%	0.00%
Hispanic or Latino (any race)	108	104	145	81.82%	88.89%	97.32%
Total	132	117	149	100.00%	100.00%	100.00%

=== 2010 census ===
As of the census of 2010, there were 117 people, 40 households, and 35 families residing in the CDP. The population density was 15.4 people per square mile (5.9/km^{2}). There were 53 housing units at an average density of 6.2/sq mi (2.4/km^{2}). The racial makeup of the CDP was 85.61% White, 9.09% from other races, and 5.30% from two or more races. Hispanic or Latino people of any race were 81.82% of the population.

There were 40 households, out of which 40.0% had children under the age of 18 living with them, 77.5% were married couples living together, 7.5% had a female householder with no husband present, and 12.5% were non-families. 10.0% of all households were made up of individuals, and none had someone living alone who was 65 years of age or older. The average household size was 3.30 and the average family size was 3.57.

In the CDP, the population was spread out, with 34.8% under the age of 18, 6.8% from 18 to 24, 25.0% from 25 to 44, 29.5% from 45 to 64, and 3.8% who were 65 years of age or older. The median age was 30 years. For every 100 females, there were 103.1 males. For every 100 females age 18 and over, there were 104.8 males.

The median income for a household in the CDP was $24,643, and the median income for a family was $48,500. Males had a median income of $16,875 versus $0 for females. The per capita income for the CDP was $11,994. There were 8.3% of families and 25.7% of the population living below the poverty line, including 31.8% of under eighteens and 40.0% of those over 64.

== Education ==
Botines is served by the United Independent School District. Zoned schools include: San Isidro Elementary School, Elias Herrera Middle School, and United High School.

The designated community college for Webb County is Laredo Community College.

== See also ==
- List of census-designated places in Texas
