= Miss USA 1995 =

- Date: February 10, 1995
- Presenters: Bob Goen; Daisy Fuentes
- Venue: South Padre Island Convention Centre; South Padre Island, Texas
- Broadcaster: CBS, KGBT-TV
- Entrants: 51
- Placements: 12
- Winner: Chelsi Smith; Texas

Miss USA 1995 was the 44th Miss USA pageant, televised live from South Padre Island, Texas, on February 10, 1995, co-hosted by Bob Goen and Daisy Fuentes with musical guest Barry Manilow.

The pageant was won by Chelsi Smith of Texas, who was crowned by outgoing titleholder Lu Parker of South Carolina.

== Results ==
Final results	Contestant
Miss USA 1995	Texas – Chelsi Smith
1st Runner-Up	(New York (state)) New York – Shanna Moakler
2nd Runner-Up	Illinois – Nicole Holmes
Top 6	Florida – Shannon DePuy; Louisiana – Elizabeth Coxe; Minnesota – Angelique de Maison
Top 12	Massachusetts – Kristen Mastroianni; Kentucky – Mitzi Jones; Oklahoma – Du Sharme Carter; Maryland – Jennifer Wilhoit; Missouri – Britt Powell; Rhode Island – Jennifer Aubin

== Delegates ==
The Miss USA 1995 delegates were:

- Alabama – Anna Mingus
- Alaska – Teresa Lindley
- Arizona – Shara Riggs
- Arkansas – Kristen Bettis
- California - Deana Avila
- Colorado – Emily Weeks
- Connecticut – Traci Bryant
- Delaware – Nicole Garis
- (Washington, D.C.) District of Columbia – Marci Andrews
- Florida – Shannon DePuy
- (Georgia (U.S. state)) Georgia – Paulette Schier
- Hawaii – Lynn Vesnefski
- Idaho – Amy Tolzmann
- Illinois – Nicole Holmes
- Indiana – Heather Hart
- Iowa – Angela Hearne
- Kansas – Deborah Daulton
- Kentucky – Mitzi Jones
- Louisiana – Elizabeth Coxe
- Maine – Kerri Malinowski
- Maryland – Jennifer Wilhoit
- Massachusetts – Kristen Mastroianni
- Michigan – Keisha Eichelberger
- Minnesota – Angelique de Maison
- Mississippi – Jill Tullos
- Missouri – Britt Powell
- Montana – Angela Janich
- Nebraska – Chandelle Peacock
- Nevada – Brooke Hammond
- New Hampshire – Valerie Gosselin
- New Jersey – Christy Pittner
- New Mexico – Jacqueline Grice
- (New York (state)) New York – Shanna Moakler
- North Carolina – Michelle Mauney
- North Dakota – Jean Stallmo
- Ohio – Julia Hughes
- Oklahoma – Du Sharme Carter
- Oregon – Karrie Grove
- Pennsylvania – Stephanie Fallat
- Rhode Island – Jennifer Aubin
- South Carolina – Danielle Corley
- South Dakota – Jenny Shobeck
- Tennessee – Lee Ann Huey
- Texas – Chelsi Smith
- Utah – Melanie Mitton
- Vermont – Jennifer Cazeault
- Virginia – Susan Robinson
- (Washington (state)) Washington – Theresa Cox
- West Virginia – Tracy Holcomb
- Wisconsin – Tanae Geisler
- Wyoming – Susan Shaffer

== Judges ==
- Peter Barton – actor
- Dr. Joyce Brothers – psychologist
- K Callan – actress
- Jim Jeffcoat – NFL defensive lineman
- Casey Kasem – radio host, announcer, actor
- Chris Kole – fashion designer
- Jackie Loughery – Miss USA 1952 from New York
- E.G. Marshall – actor
- Mary McFadden – fashion designer
- Kiki Shepard – actress
