= Miss Texas USA =

Beauty pageant edition

- Formation: 1952
- Type: Beauty pageant
- Headquarters: Dallas
- Location: Texas
- Members: Miss USA
- Official language: English
- Website: Official website

The Miss Texas USA competition is the pageant that selects the representative for the state Texas in the Miss USA pageant, and the name of the title held by that winner. This pageant is part of the Miss USA Organization, owned by Texas native Crystle Stewart, herself a Miss USA for 2008.

The pageant is currently held in Houston. It has previously been hosted by El Paso, San Antonio, South Padre Island, Lubbock and Laredo. It was televised from 1971 to 2009.

The current titleholder is Alexis Fuetsch of San Antonio, was appointed Miss Texas USA 2026 on June 30th, 2026 after the open casting call from Thomas Brodeur, the new owner of the national pageant. She will represent Texas at Miss USA 2026.

== Background ==
Unlike the rest of Miss and Teen state pageants in the Miss USA system have annually scheduled at the same time, this Miss and Teen pageants in Texas are held separately in different months, the Miss pageant goes first and is held on first Sunday of September every year. Those events have affected from the regular September schedule such as the 2018 pageant was held in January 2018 due to Hurricane Harvey devastated the pageant's host city, Houston; and the 2021 pageant was held in September 2021 due to the COVID-19 pandemic, exactly a year originally planned for September 2020.

Ten Miss Texas USA titleholders have won the Miss USA title, including Chelsi Smith, has been crowned Miss Universe. In the 1980s Texas won the Miss USA title five consecutive years from 1985 to 1989, a streak known as the "Texas Aces". Prior to this no state had ever won the Miss USA pageant more than two times in succession. Past state directors have included Richard Guy and Rex Holt, "GuyRex" and Al and Gail Clark of "The Crystal Group".

Contestants enter by winning local pageants or may choose to compete "at large" with an assigned title. In 2001 a record number of former Miss Texas Teen USA winners, six, competed for the Miss Texas USA 2002 title.

=== Texas Aces ===
Prior to the 1980s, no other state had won more than two Miss USA pageants in succession (the only two states to win twice in succession were Virginia in 1969-1970 and Illinois in 1973–1974). The five Texan Miss USA winners were all coached by "GuyRex", Richard Guy and Rex Holt, who held the Texas franchise from 1975. The term was first used in 1988 after Gibbs became their fourth consecutive titleholder, with Guy referring to the four queens as "four aces in a deck of cards", with their fifth titleholder, Kimberly "Kim" Tomes (1977) as the "wildcard". The following year Gretchen Polhemus became the fifth and final "ace". The term is still in use.

As well as directing the Texas pageant, GuyRex also acquired the Miss California USA franchise in 1986. In 1988, Diana Magaña of California placed first runner-up to Gibbs, the fourth ace. The two had both undergone extensive preparation by GuyRex, and even lived together prior to the pageant.

The five Aces were:

- 1985 - Laura Martinez-Herring (Miss USA, Top 10 at Miss Universe 1985)
- 1986 - Christy Fichtner (Miss USA, 1st runner-up at Miss Universe 1986)
- 1987 - Michelle Royer (Miss USA, 2nd runner-up at Miss Universe 1987)
- 1988 - Courtney Gibbs (Miss USA, Top 10 at Miss Universe 1988)
- 1989 - Gretchen Polhemus (Miss USA, 2nd runner-up at Miss Universe 1989)

== Gallery ==
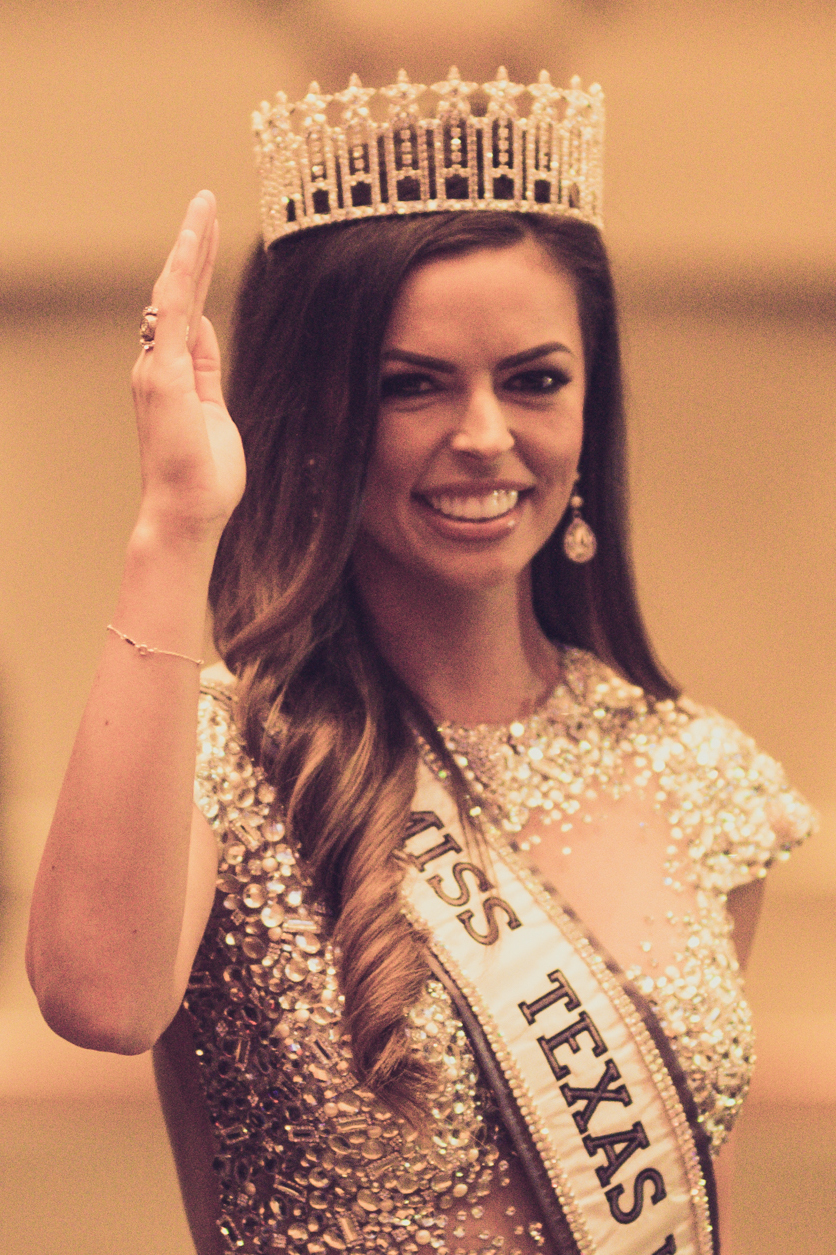
Logan Lester, Miss Texas USA 2018

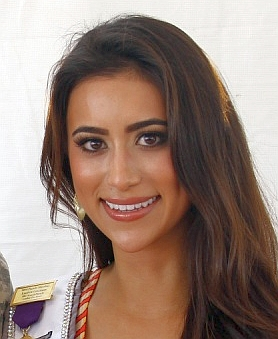
Lauren Guzman, Miss Texas Teen USA 2008 and Miss Texas USA 2014

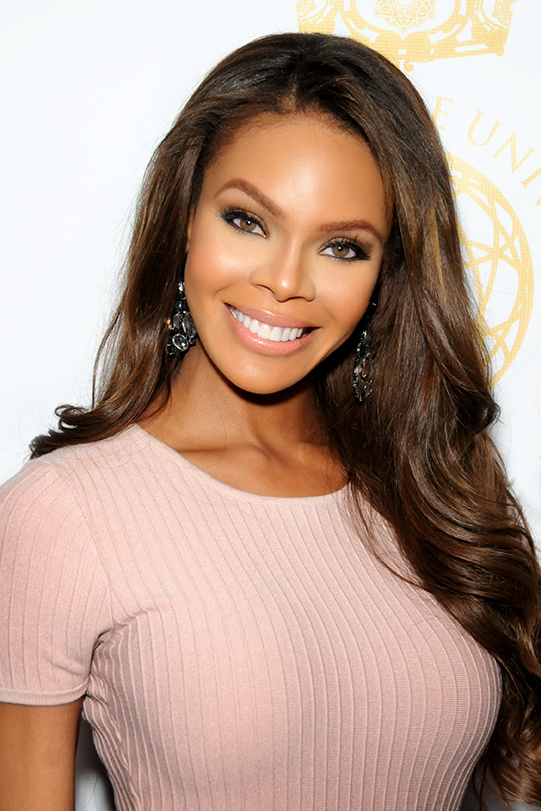
Crystle Stewart, Miss Texas USA 2008 and Miss USA 2008 (pictured in 2014)

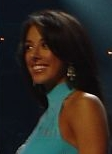
Stephanie Guerrero, Miss Texas USA 2004

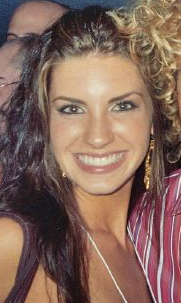
Nicole O'Brian, Miss Texas Teen USA 2000 and Miss Texas USA 2003

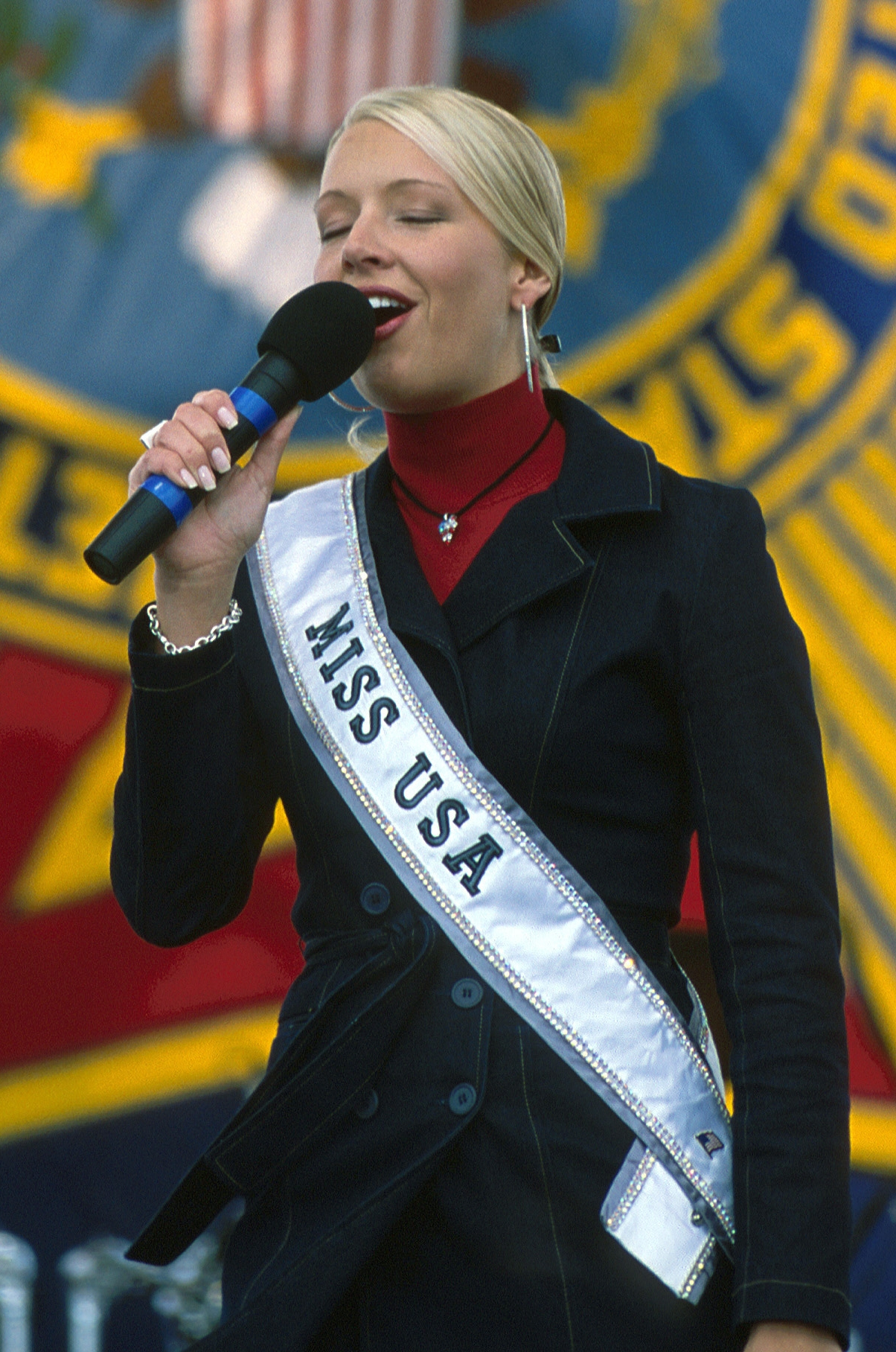
Kandace "Kandy" Krueger, Miss Texas USA 2001 and Miss USA 2001

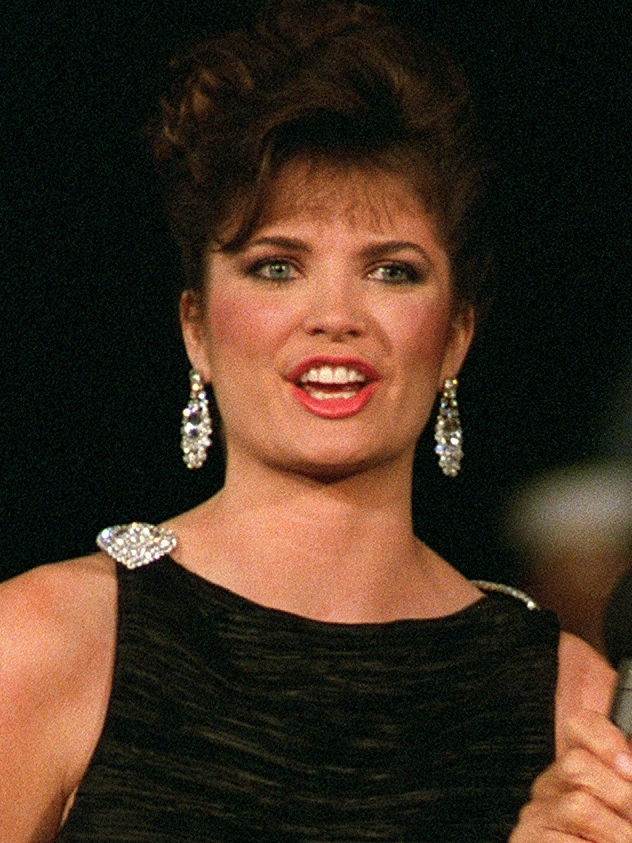
Michelle Royer, Miss Texas USA 1987 and Miss USA 1987

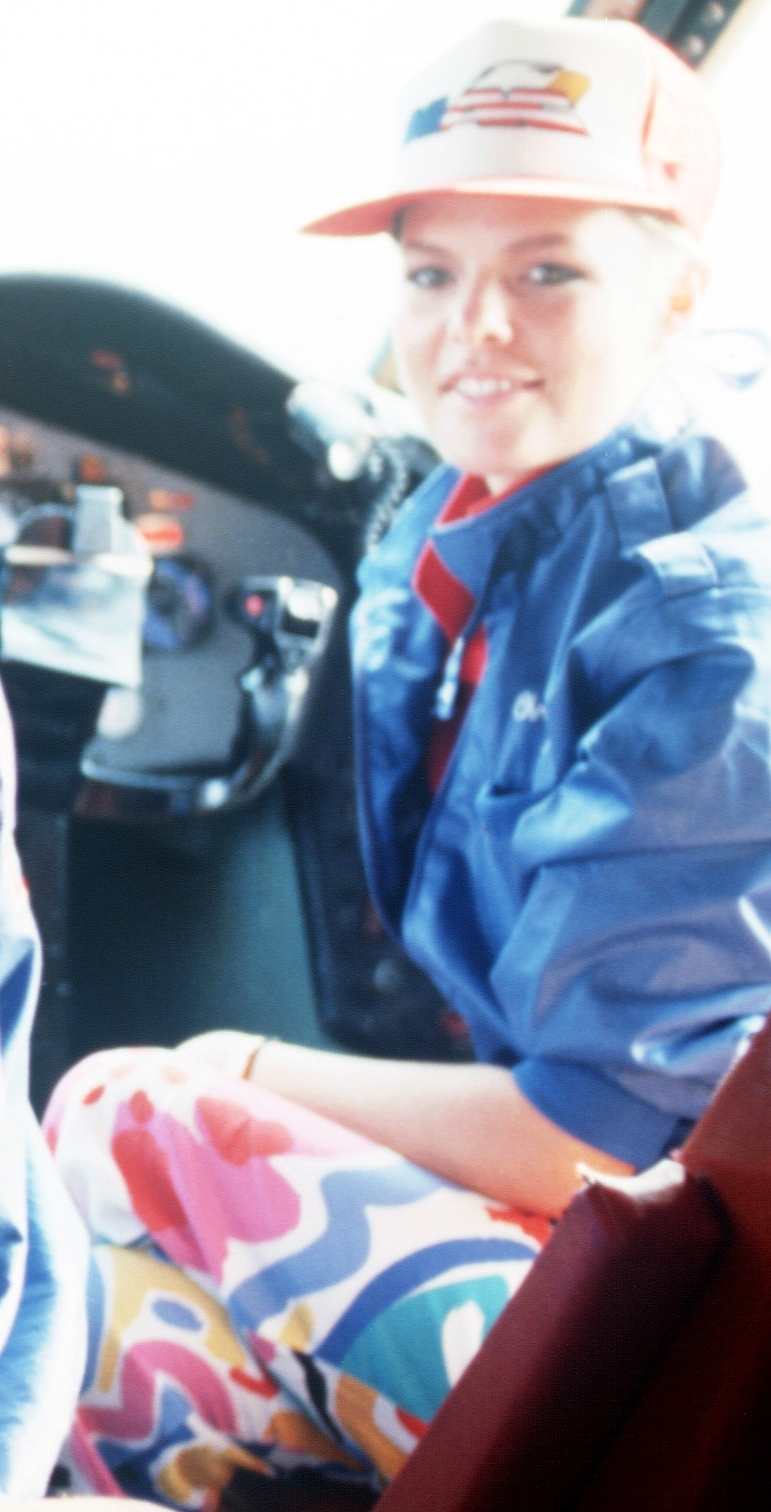
Christy Fichtner, Miss Texas USA 1986 and Miss USA 1986

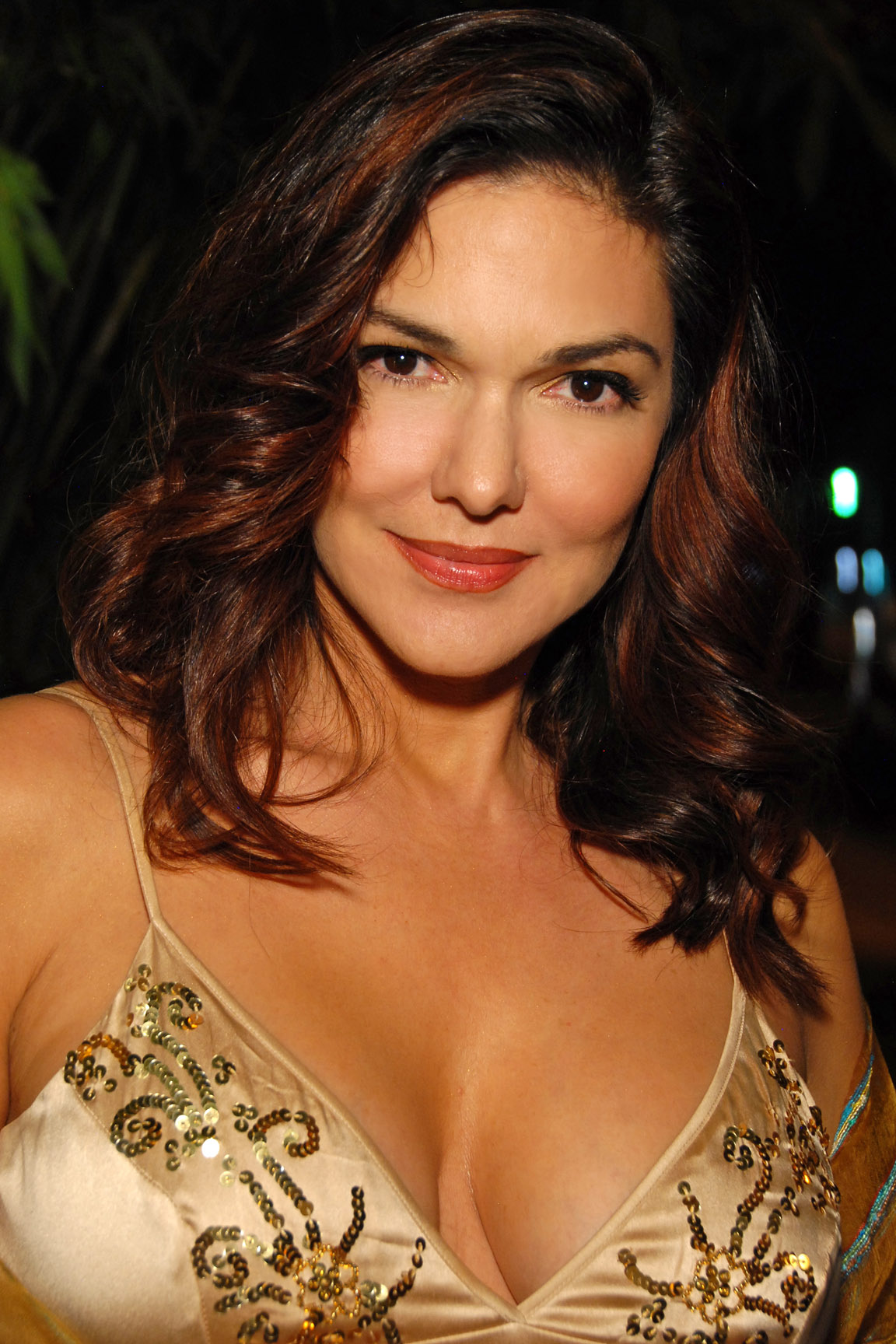
Laura Martinez Harring, Miss Texas USA 1985 and Miss USA 1985 (pictured in 2011)

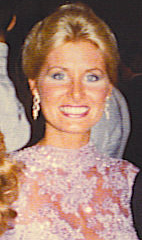
Lisa Allred, Miss Texas USA 1983

== Results summary ==
=== Placements ===
- Miss USAs: Kimberly Tomes (1977), Laura Martinez Herring (1985), Christy Fichtner (1986), Michelle Royer (1987), Courtney Gibbs (1988), Gretchen Polhemus (1989), Chelsi Smith (1995), Kandace Krueger (2001), Crystle Stewart (2008), R'Bonney Gabriel (2022)
- 1st runners-up: Carelgean Douglas (1959), Diane Balloun (1964), Brenda Box (1971), Luann Caughey (1982), Lisa Allred (1983), Ylianna Guerra (2015)
- 2nd runners-up: Barbara Horan (1978), Nicole O'Brian (2003)
- 3rd runners-up: Betty Lee (1954), Ana Rodriguez (2011), Taylor Lauren Davis (2025)
- 4th runners-up: Jo Dodson (1956), Aundie Evers (1975), Alexandria Nugent (2013), Lluvia Alzate (2023)
- Top 5/6/8: Christine Friedel (1994), Amanda Little (1997), Holly Mills (1998), Victoria Hinojosa (2021)
- Top 10/11/12: Lavonne McConnell (1973), Candace Gray (1976), Anne Hinnant (1979), Barbara Buckley (1980), Diana Durnford (1981), Laura Shaw (1984), Stephanie Kuehne (1990), Katie Young (1992), Angie Sisk (1993), Kara Williams (1996), Kasi Kelly (2002), Lauren Lanning (2006), Magen Ellis (2007), Brooke Daniels (2009), Brittany Booker (2012), Aareianna Ware (2024)
- Top 15: Joan Bradshaw (1953), Mary Daughters (1955), Gloria Hunt (1957), Linda Daugherty (1958), Jackie Williams (1962), Phillis Johnson (1965), Dorothy Pickens (1966), Bonnie Robinson (1967), Sandy Drewes (1969), Diane Swendeman (1970), Stephanie Guerrero (2004), Tyler Willis (2005), Logan Lester (2018)

Texas holds a record of 58 placements at Miss USA, being placed first overall.

=== Awards ===
- Miss Congeniality: Diane Swendeman (1970), Chelsi Smith (1995)
- Miss Photogenic: Susan Peters (1972), Lisa Allred (1983), Laura Shaw (1984), Tyler Willis (2005)
- Best State Costume: Lavonne McConnell (1973), Kimberly Tomes (1977), Barbara Horan (1978), R'Bonney Gabriel (2022)
- Best in Swimsuit: Chelsi Smith (1995), Lluvia Alzate (2023)

== Winners ==
Color key

- Declared as Winner
- Ended as runner-up
- Ended as finalist or semifinalist

Year	Name	Hometown	Local Title	Age (Note: Age at the time of the pageant)	Placement at Miss USA	Special awards at Miss USA	Notes
2026	Alexis Maxine Fuetsch	San Antonio	Miss San Antonio	20			
2025	Taylor Lauren Davis	Dallas	Miss Dallas	26	3rd runner-up		2nd runner-up at Miss Maryland USA 2021; 3rd runner-up at Miss Texas USA 2023; Top 18 at Miss Texas USA 2024
2024	Taia Aarieanna Ware	Dallas	Miss Dallas	26	Top 10		
2023	Lluvia Camila Alzate	Houston	Miss Houston	26	4th runner-up	Best in Swimsuit	3rd runner-up at Miss Texas USA 2022
2022	Allison "Allie" Drake	Dallas	Miss Dallas	26	Originally second runner-up, assumed title when Gabriel won Miss Universe (Sydni Leonard, the first runner-up, declined the offer)		
2022	R'Bonney Nola Gabriel	Houston	Miss Friendswood	28	Miss USA 2022	Best State Costume	Miss Universe 2022; First Asian American Miss Texas USA; 1st runner-up at Miss Texas USA 2021
2021	Victoria Alejandra Hinojosa	McAllen	Miss South Texas	22	Top 8		Granddaughter of U.S. Representative TX-15 Rubén Hinojosa; Top 18 at Miss Texas Teen USA 2015; 2nd runner-up at Miss Texas Teen USA 2016; 3rd runner-up at Miss Texas Teen USA 2017
2020	Taylor Leigh Kessler	Houston	Miss Lone Star	24			Previously Miss Grand USA 2017; Longest reigning Miss Texas USA (2 years and 3 days) and also the longest reigning Miss USA state titleholder under three calendar years in the organization's history; Top 18 at Miss Texas Teen USA 2015; Participated in Miss Texas USA 2016; Top 16 at Miss Texas USA 2019
2019	Alayah Nicole Benavidez	San Antonio	Miss San Antonio	23			Previously Miss United States 2016; 2nd runner-up at Miss Texas Teen USA 2014; Participated in Miss Texas USA 2015 and 2016; Later a contestant on season 24 of The Bachelor
2018	Logan Makenzie Lester	Houston	Miss Harris County	23	Top 15		Shortest reigning Miss Texas USA (7 months and 27 days); Top 15 at Miss Texas Teen USA 2011 and 2013; 4th runner-up at Miss Texas Teen USA 2012; 3rd runner-up at Miss Texas USA 2015; Top 17 at Miss Texas USA 2016; Top 16 at Miss Texas USA 2017
2017	Nancy Gonzalez	Freeport	Miss Kemah	27			Competed in Nuestra Belleza Latina 2010; Top 17 at Miss Texas USA 2016
2016	Daniella Rodriguez	Laredo	Miss Central Webb County	19			Previously Miss Texas Teen USA 2013; Participated in Miss Texas Teen USA 2011; Top 15 at Miss Texas Teen USA 2012; Married to Carlos Correa
2015	Ylianna Lucia Marie Guerra	McAllen	Miss Tropics of Texas	22	1st runner-up		Top 16 at Miss Texas USA 2012; 2nd runner-up at Miss Texas USA 2014
2014	Lauren Nicole Guzman	Laredo	Miss Central Laredo	24			Previously Miss Texas Teen USA 2008; 3rd runner-up at Miss Texas USA 2011; 1st runner-up at Miss Texas USA 2012; 4th runner-up at Miss Texas USA 2013
2013	Alexandria Nichole "Ali" Nugent	Dallas	Miss North Texas	20	4th runner-up	Fan Vote Winner	Niece of rock musician Ted Nugent; Participated in Miss Texas USA 2012
2012	Brittany Lynn Booker	Friendswood	Miss Houston	21	Top 10		
2011	Ana Christina Rodriguez	Laredo	Miss Central Laredo	24	3rd runner-up		Top 16 at Miss Texas USA 2007; 2nd runner-up at Miss Texas USA 2008 and 2009; 1st runner-up at Miss Texas USA 2010
2010	Kelsey Elizabeth Moore	El Paso	Miss El Paso	19			
2009	Brooke Nicole Daniels	Tomball	Miss Harris County	22	Top 10		Top 16 at Miss Texas Teen USA 2004; 3rd runner-up at Miss Texas USA 2007; 1st runner-up at Miss Texas USA 2008
2008	Crystle Danae Stewart	Missouri City	Miss Fort Bend County	26	Miss USA 2008		Top 10 at Miss Universe 2008; Former President of Miss USA and Miss Teen USA; Top 12 at Miss Texas USA 2003; 3rd runner-up at Miss Texas USA 2004; 1st runner-up at Miss Texas USA 2006 and 2007
2007	Magen Leigh Ellis	Tyler	Miss Houston	19	Top 10		Previously Miss Texas Teen USA 2004 (Top 15 at Miss Teen USA 2004); 3rd runner-up at Miss Texas Teen USA 2002; Top 16 at Miss Texas Teen USA 2003; Top 10 at Miss Texas USA 2006
2006	Lauren Lanning	Friendswood	Miss Houston	22	Top 10		Top 16 at Miss Texas Teen USA 2002; Participated in Miss Texas USA 2003; 3rd runner-up at Miss Texas USA 2004; 2nd runner-up at Miss Texas USA 2005
2005	Tyler Colie Willis	Lubbock	Miss Central Plains	25	Top 15	Miss Photogenic	Participated in Miss Texas USA 2001; Top 16 at Miss Texas USA 2002; 1st runner-up at Miss Texas USA 2004
2004	Stephanie Guerrero	Lake Jackson	Miss Houston	23	Top 15		Top 12 at Miss Texas USA 2000; 3rd runner-up at Miss Texas USA 2001; 1st runner-up at Miss Texas USA 2002; Participated in Miss Texas USA 2003
2003	Claudia Nicole O'Brian	Friendswood	Miss Bay Area	20	2nd runner-up		Previously Miss Texas Teen USA 2000; 1st Runner-up & Best in Swimsuit at Miss Teen USA 2000; 3rd runner-up at Miss Texas Teen USA 1999; Participated in Miss Texas USA 2002; Contestant on The Amazing Race 5
2002	Kasi Laine Kelly	Bridgeport	Miss DFW	20	Top 12		Top 12 at Miss Texas USA 2000; 2nd runner-up at Miss Texas USA 2001
2001	Kandace Gayle "Kandy" Krueger	Austin	Miss Austin	24	Miss USA 2001		2nd runner-up at Miss Universe 2001; Participated in Miss Texas USA 1996, 1997, 1999 and 2000
2000	Heather Ogilvie	Houston	Miss Southeast Texas	22			Participated in Miss Texas USA 1998
1999	Carissa Nicole Blair	Houston	Miss Southeast Texas	25			Previously Miss Texas Teen USA 1992; Top 12 at Miss Texas USA 1997; 3rd runner-up at Miss Texas USA 1998
1998	Holly Christine Mills	San Antonio	Miss San Antonio	22	Top 5		3rd runner-up at Miss Texas Teen USA 1991; Participated in Miss Texas USA 1996 and 1997
1997	Amanda Elizabeth Little	Wylie	Miss Metroplex	21	Top 6		Top 12 at Miss Texas USA 1995; 4th runner-up at Miss Texas USA 1996
1996	Kara Williams	Houston	Miss Harris County	23	Top 10		Previously Miss Texas Teen USA 1991 (Top 12 at Miss Teen USA 1991); Top 12 at Miss Texas USA 1994; 2nd runner-up at Miss Texas USA 1995
Title vacant
1995	Chelsi Mariam-Pearl Smith	Deer Park	Miss Galveston County	21	Miss USA 1995	Miss Congeniality and Best in Swimsuit	Miss Universe 1995; First African American Miss Texas USA; Top 12 at Miss Texas USA 1994
1994	Christine Louise Friedel	El Paso	Miss El Paso	22	Top 6		
1993	Angie Sisk	Houston	Miss Fort Bend County	25	Top 12		3rd runner-up at Miss Texas USA 1991; Top 15 at Miss Texas USA 1992
1992	Katie Nicole Young	Fort Worth	Miss Fort Worth	19	Top 11		Semi-finalist at Miss Texas Teen USA 1988
1991	Christy Lea "Chris" Bogard	Tomball	Miss North Harris County	22			3rd runner-up at Miss Texas USA 1990
1990	Sue Stephanie Kuehne	Missouri City	Miss Houston	22	Top 12		Miss Wonderland 1989; 1st runner-up at Miss Texas USA 1989
1989	Gretchen Lynn Polhemus	Fort Worth	Miss Fort Worth	23	Miss USA 1989		2nd runner-up at Miss Universe 1989; 2nd runner-up at Miss Texas USA 1988; Mother of Miss Utah USA 2017, Baylee Jensen
1988	Courtney Ann Gibbs	Fort Worth	Miss Metroplex	21	Miss USA 1988		Top 10 at Miss Universe 1988
1987	Michelle Renee Royer	Keller	Miss Keller	21	Miss USA 1987		2nd runner-up at Miss Universe 1987
1986	Christiane Crane "Christy" Fichtner	Dallas	Miss Dallas County	23	Miss USA 1986		1st runner-up at Miss Universe 1986; Top 15 in Miss Texas USA 1983
1985	Laura Elena Martinez-Herring	El Paso	Miss El Paso County	21	Miss USA 1985		Top 10 at Miss Universe 1985; First Hispanic Miss Texas USA
1984	Laura Shaw	Burleson	Miss Burleson	19	Top 10	Miss Photogenic	
1983	Lisa Gayle Allred	Fort Worth	Miss Fort Worth	21	1st runner-up	Miss Photogenic	6th runner-up at Miss World 1983; 1st runner-up at Miss Texas USA 1982
1982	Elizabeth LuAnn Caughey	Abilene	Miss Abilene	22	1st runner-up		4th runner-up at Miss World 1982; 1st runner-up at Miss Texas USA 1981
1981	Diana Louise Durnford	El Paso	Miss Sun City	22	Top 12		2nd runner-up at Miss Texas USA 1980
1980	Barbara Anne Buckley	Midland	Miss West Texas	22	Top 12		
1979	Winifred Anne Hinnant	Houston	Miss Harris County	19	Top 12		
1978	Barbara Jo Horan	Dallas	Miss Dallas	21	2nd runner-up	Best State Costume	
1977	Kimberly Louise "Kim" Tomes	Houston	Miss Spring Branch/Memorial	21	Miss USA 1977	Best State Costume	Top 12 at Miss Universe 1977; Miss Texas World 1974 and 1st runner up at Miss World USA 1974; 2nd runner-up at Miss Texas USA 1976
1976	Mary Candace "Candy" Gray	El Paso	Miss El Paso	20	Top 12		Died in a scuba diving accident in 1981
1975	Aundie Evers	El Paso	Miss El Paso	19	4th runner-up		Participated in Miss Texas 1974
1974	Debra Kay Cronin	McDade		18			
1973	Marion LaVon McConnell	Haltom City	Miss Haltom-Richland	19	Top 12	Best State Costume	Top 10 at Miss Texas 1971
1972	Susan Lynette Peters	Austin	Miss Stephen F. Austin State University	21		Miss Photogenic	
1971	Brenda Lynn Box	Amarillo	Miss Amarillo	19	1st runner-up		
1970	Diane Farrar Swendeman	Fort Worth	Miss Highland Lakes	21	Top 15	Miss Congeniality	
1969	Sande Drewes	Dallas	Miss Dallas	23	Top 15		
1968	Jeannie Wilson	Dallas	Miss Dallas	21			3rd runner-up at Miss Texas 1966; 4th runner-up at Miss Texas 1967
1967	Bonnie Sue Robinson	Houston	Miss Houston	19	Top 15		
1966	Dorothy Lou Pickens	Edinburg	Miss Edinburg	19	Top 15		
1965	Phyllis Johnson	Galveston		20	Top 15		
1964	Diane Elaine Balloun	Houston	Miss Houston	19	1st runner-up		
1963	Cheryl Rene Wilburn	Houston	Miss Bayshore	18			
1962	Jackie Faye Williams	Waxahachie	Miss Lake Whitney	20	Top 15		
1961	Sheila Louise Wade	Dallas	Miss Lake Whitney	18			
1960	Patricia June "Pat" Cloud	Houston	Miss Lake Whitney	20			
1959	Carelgean Douglas	Corpus Christi	Miss Lake Texoma	20	1st runner-up		
1958	Linda Ann Daugherty	Abilene	Miss Abilene	18	Top 15		
1957	Gloria Lee Hunt	Corpus Christi	Miss Buccaneer Days	20	Top 15		
1956	Jo Dodson	Cleburne	Miss Lake Whitney	18	4th runner-up		
1955	Mary Miles Daughters	Kingsville		19	Top 15		
1954	Betty Virginia Lee	Austin		19	3rd runner-up		
1953	Joan Gail Bradshaw	Houston		18	Top 15		Top 10 at Miss Texas 1954
1952	Charlene Frances McClary	Houston		25			
