= Ana Rodriguez (Miss Texas USA) =

American model

- Born: Ana Christina Rodriguez; January 20, 1986 (age 40); Laredo, Texas, US
- Height: 1.73 m (5 ft 8 in)
- Beauty pageant titleholder
- Title: Miss Laredo USA 2006; Miss Webb County USA 2007; Miss Port Laredo USA 2008; Miss Central Texas USA 2009; Miss Central Laredo USA 2010; Miss Texas USA 2011
- Major competitions: Miss Texas USA 2011; (Winner); Miss USA 2011; (3rd Runner-Up)

Ana Christina Rodriguez (born January 20, 1986) is an American beauty pageant titleholder from Laredo, Texas. On her fifth attempt at the statewide title, she was crowned Miss Texas USA 2011 and went on to be named third runner-up to Miss USA 2011.

== Pageant career ==
=== Early years ===
Rodriguez first entered the Miss USA system of pageants in 2006. She was chosen as Miss Laredo USA and competed for the Miss Texas USA 2007 title, placing in the top 16 finalists and voted "Miss Congeniality" by her fellow contestants on June 25, 2006.

She won the Miss Webb County USA crown in 2007 and competed for the Miss Texas USA 2008 title where she was named second runner-up on July 1, 2007. The following year she was named Miss Port Laredo USA and competed for the Miss Texas USA 2009 title where she was named second runner-up on June 29, 2008. In 2009, competing as Miss Central Texas USA, Rodriguez was named first runner-up at the Miss Texas USA 2010 competition on September 6, 2009.

=== Miss Texas USA ===
In 2010, Rodriguez won the title of Miss Central Laredo USA and competed at the Miss Texas USA 2011 pageant in Houston, Texas. Her fifth try proved to be the charm and she was crowned Miss Texas USA 2011 on September 5, 2010. Rodriguez is the first Laredo native to be named Miss Texas USA.

As Miss Texas USA, Rodriguez represented the state in a variety of events across Texas and around the United States. These included serving as the grand marshal of the Fiesta Flambeau Parade in San Antonio, meeting the troops aboard the USS Iwo Jima during Fleet Week in New York City, running the Rock 'n' Roll Dallas Half Marathon, and helping to construct the world's largest peanut butter and jelly sandwich at the Great American Peanut Butter Festival in Grand Saline, Texas.

=== Miss USA ===
Winning the Miss Texas USA 2011 title allowed Rodriguez to compete in Las Vegas for the national Miss USA 2011 title. During the competition, Rodriguez made international headlines for her interview competition response that the wives of politicians caught cheating on them should leave their husbands "and find a man who really loves you." She was named third runner-up during the nationally televised finals on June 19, 2011.

== Personal life ==
Rodriguez was born in Laredo, Texas in 1986. = She is a 2004 graduate of Laredo's United High School. Rodriguez graduated from Concordia University Texas in 2009 with a bachelor's degree in communications. She has modeled for Seventeen, Pageantry and Savvy magazines. Rodriguez works as a preschool teacher in Austin, Texas.

Awards and achievements
Preceded by Kelsey Moore	Miss Texas USA; 2011	Succeeded by Brittany Booker
