= Sunset Acres, Texas =

- CDP
- Interactive map of Sunset Acres, Texas
- Coordinates: 27°47′39″N 99°27′24″W
- Country: United States
- State: Texas
- County: Webb
- Elevation: 715 ft (218 m)

Population (2020)
  - Total: 4
- Time zone: UTC-6 (Central (CST))
  - Summer (DST): UTC-5 (CDT)
- Zip Code: 78045
- GNIS feature ID: 2586994

Sunset Acres is a census-designated place (CDP) in Webb County, Texas, United States. This was a new CDP formed from parts of the Botines CDP prior to the 2010 census. As of the 2020 census, Sunset Acres had a population of 4.

It is one of several colonias in the county.

== Geography ==
Sunset Acres is located at 27°47′39″N 99°27′24″W (27.794165, -99.456603).

== Demographics ==
Historical population
Census	Pop.	Note	%±
2010	23		—
2020	4		−82.6%
U.S. Decennial Census; 1850–1900 1910; 1920 1930 1940; 1950 1960 1970; 1980 1990 2000; 2010

Sunset Acres first appeared as a census designated place prior to the 2010 U.S. census, one of four CDPs (Bonanza Hills, Four Points, Los Veteranos II, and Sunset Acres) formed in full or in part from the Botines CDP.

=== 2020 census ===
Sunset Acres CDP, Texas – Racial and ethnic composition Note: the US Census treats Hispanic/Latino as an ethnic category. This table excludes Latinos from the racial categories and assigns them to a separate category. Hispanics/Latinos may be of any race.
Race / Ethnicity (NH = Non-Hispanic)	Pop 2010	Pop 2020	% 2010	% 2020
White alone (NH)	3	0	13.04%	0.00%
Black or African American alone (NH)	0	0	0.00%	0.00%
Native American or Alaska Native alone (NH)	0	0	0.00%	0.00%
Asian alone (NH)	0	0	0.00%	0.00%
Native Hawaiian or Pacific Islander alone (NH)	0	0	0.00%	0.00%
Other race alone (NH)	0	0	0.00%	0.00%
Mixed race or Multiracial (NH)	0	0	0.00%	0.00%
Hispanic or Latino (any race)	20	4	86.96%	100.00%
Total	23	4	100.00%	100.00%

== Education ==
Residents are in the United Independent School District. Zoned schools include: San Isidro Elementary School, Elias Herrera Middle School, United High School.

The designated community college for Webb County is Laredo Community College.
