= Miss USA 1976 =

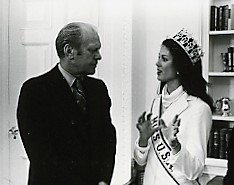
- US President Gerald Ford meets with Peterson in 1976
- Date: May 15, 1976
- Presenters: Bob Barker
- Entertainment: Engelbert Humperdinck
- Venue: Niagara Falls, New York
- Entrants: 51
- Placements: 12
- Winner: Barbara Peterson; Minnesota
- Photogenic: Liz Wickersham (Georgia (U.S. state)) Georgia

Miss USA 1976 was the 25th Miss USA pageant, televised live by CBS from Niagara Falls, New York, on May 15, 1976.

The pageant was won by Barbara Peterson of Minnesota, who succeeded outgoing titleholder Summer Bartholomew of California. Peterson was the first – and to date only – woman from Minnesota to win the Miss USA title, and went on to participate at Miss Universe 1976, where she became the first Miss USA titleholder to fail to advance to the semi-final stage of the pageant.

== Results ==
Final Results	Contestant
Miss USA 1976	Minnesota - Barbara Peterson
1st Runner-Up	Michigan - Kevin Gale
2nd Runner-Up	Oregon - Gail Atchison
3rd Runner-Up	South Carolina - Virginia Murray
4th Runner-Up	Louisiana - Robyn Sanders
Top 12	California - Joan Pennock; (Georgia (U.S. state)) Georgia - Liz Wickersham; Illinois - Kathy Schmalen; Missouri - Donna Hibbits; New Mexico - Jonelle Bergquist; Texas - Mary Gray; (Washington (state)) Washington - Norene Gilbert

== Delegates ==
The Miss USA 1976 delegates were:

- Alabama – Kyle Ellis
- Alaska – Liz Staib
- Arizona – Curvey Walters
- Arkansas – Sonia Kay Jines
- California - Joan Pennock
- Colorado – Patricia Sweany
- Connecticut – Roslyn Ralph
- Delaware – Debbie Kucher
- (Washington, D.C.) District of Columbia – Nancy Stitt
- Florida – Leigh Walsh
- (Georgia (U.S. state)) Georgia – Liz Wickersham
- Hawaii – Brenda Texeira
- Idaho – Cheryl Gilbert
- Illinois – Kathy Schmalen
- Indiana – Annette Anderson
- Iowa – Sheri Lynn Davenport
- Kansas – Deborah Vitera
- Kentucky – Connie Clark
- Louisiana – Robyn Sanders
- Maine – Dawn St. Clair
- Maryland – Linda Lee Potter
- Massachusetts – Holly Ann Hoyle
- Michigan – Kevin Gale
- Minnesota – Barbara Peterson
- Mississippi – Teresa Camp
- Missouri – Donna Hibbits
- Montana – Teresa Jane Klaus
- Nebraska – Catherine Fricke
- Nevada – Janice Carrell
- New Hampshire – Sinceree "Peggy" Rowlette
- New Jersey – Ginger Hagaman
- New Mexico – Jonelle Bergquist
- (New York (state)) New York – Carol Doerr
- North Carolina – Dianne Bowen
- North Dakota – Linda Faye Paulson
- Ohio – Karen Myers
- Oklahoma – Lori Hansen
- Oregon – Gail Atchison
- Pennsylvania – Marcy Zambelli
- Rhode Island – Kathleen Confreda
- South Carolina – Virginia Murray
- South Dakota – Dorothy Kay Westphal
- Tennessee – Jana Kerr
- Texas – Candace Gray
- Utah – Debbie Drecksel
- Vermont – Susan Parsons
- Virginia – Donna Dixon
- (Washington (state)) Washington – Norene Gilbert
- West Virginia – Cheryl Plants
- Wisconsin – Susan Femrite
- Wyoming – Murlie Colosky

== Judges ==
- Richard Adler – Broadway producer
- Mr. Blackwell – fashion critic
- Ernest Borgnine – actor
- Maggie Daly – Chicago Tribune gossip columnist
- Sue Ann Downey – Miss USA 1965 from Ohio
- Barry Farber – radio talk show host, author
- Alice Faye – actress, singer
- Melanie Kahane – interior designer
- Claudia McNeil – actress
- Derek Sanderson – NHL centre
- Zoli – fashion designer
