= Michelle Royer =

American model

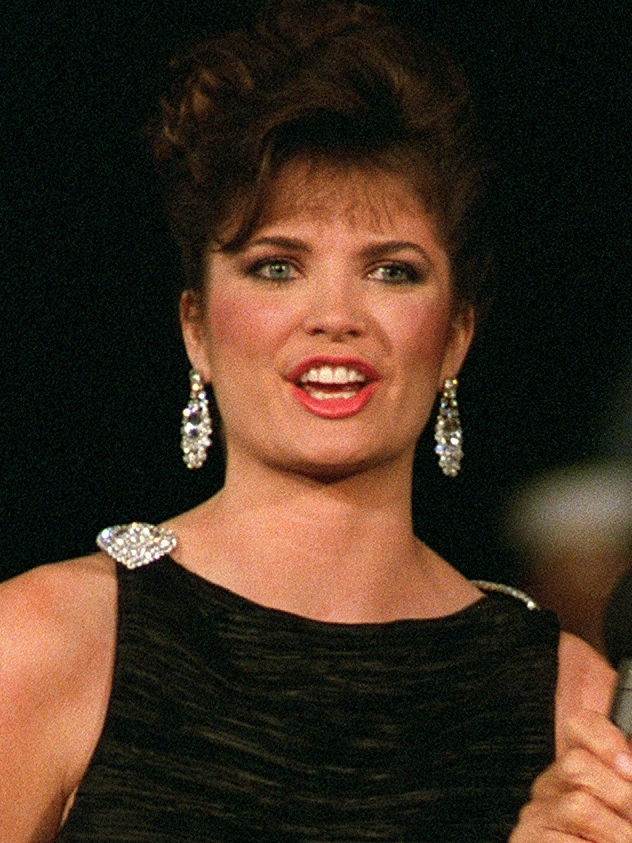
- Royer in 1987
- Born: January 5, 1966 (age 60); Keller, Texas, U.S.
- Other names: Michelle Jefferson; Michelle Royer-Jefferson
- Height: 1.80 m (5 ft 11 in)
- Spouse(s): Donald Jefferson (1988–present)
- Children: 2
- Beauty pageant titleholder
- Title: Miss Texas USA 1987; Miss USA 1987
- Hair color: Brown
- Eye color: Blue
- Major competitions: Miss Texas USA 1987; (Winner); Miss USA 1987; (Winner); Miss Universe 1987; (2nd Runner-Up)

Michelle Renee Royer-Jefferson (born January 5, 1966) is an American television personality and beauty pageant titleholder who won Miss USA 1987 and second runner-up to Miss Universe 1987.

== Early life ==
Prior to competing in Miss Texas USA, Jefferson grew up in Keller, Texas, attended Keller High School where she was active in the high school band program, serving as drum major. She continued her education at Texas Wesleyan University. She is the daughter of a salesman, who changed jobs frequently.

== Pageantry ==
=== Miss USA ===
She won the title of Miss Texas USA as the representative of Keller in August 1986 and was crowned Miss USA in February 1987, becoming the third of five consecutive winners from Texas during the 1980s.

=== Miss Universe ===
At the 1987 Miss Universe pageant, she placed first in the preliminary competition, second in the semifinal interview and third in swimsuit and evening gown, finishing second runner-up to Cecilia Bolocco of Chile. Her national costume was a cowgirl.

== Life after Miss USA ==
She is married to Donald "Banana Don" Jefferson, a morning on-air personality at country-formatted radio station WITL-FM in Lansing, Michigan. The pair met when she made a stop in Pittsburgh during an appearance shortly after winning her Miss USA title, and joined her husband briefly as half of the morning show behind the microphone when he accepted a new job as morning on-air personality at adult contemporary-formatted WSHH. They have two children together.

Awards and achievements
Preceded by Christy Fichtner	Miss Texas USA; 1987	Succeeded by Courtney Gibbs
