= Carole Gist =

American model (born 1969)

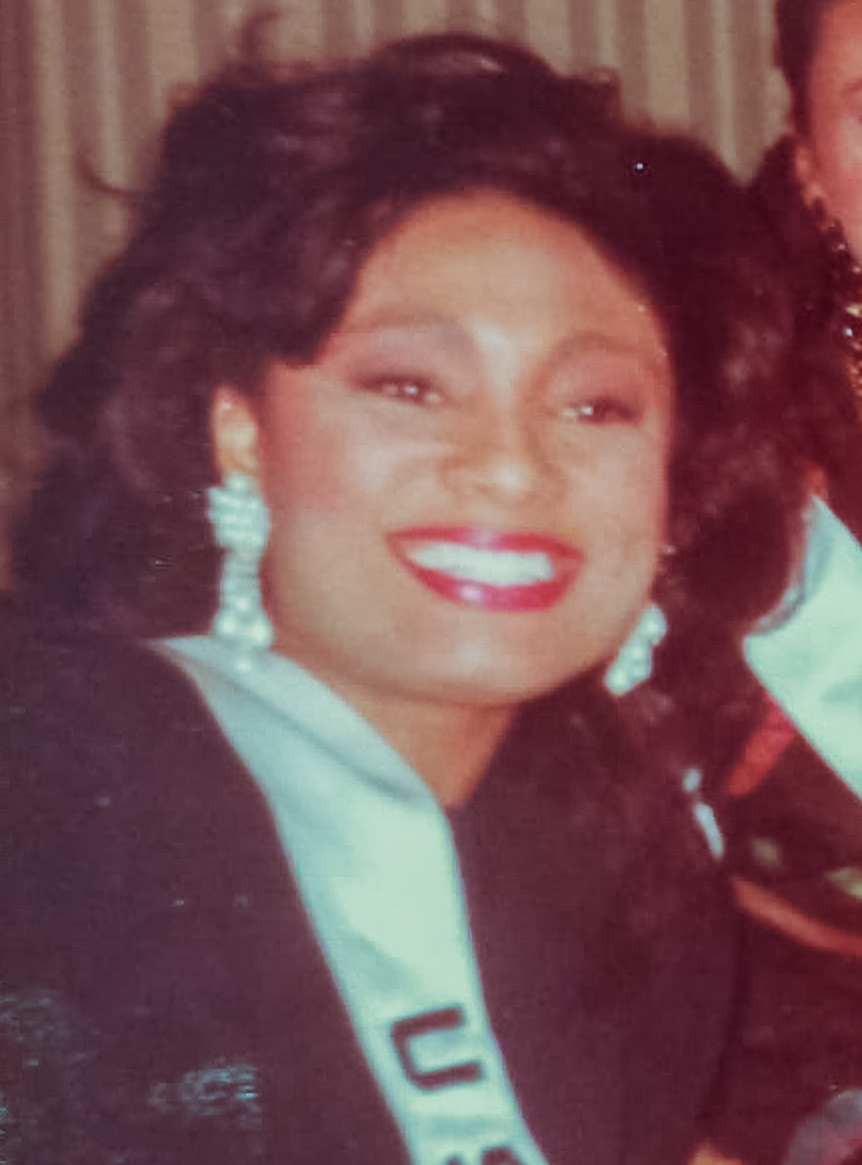
- Born: Carole Anne-Marie Gist; May 8, 1969 (age 57); Detroit, Michigan, U.S.
- Education: Cass Technical High School; Northwood University
- Height: 6 ft 0 in (1.83 m)
- Beauty pageant titleholder
- Title: Miss Michigan USA 1990; Miss USA 1990
- Hair color: Black
- Eye color: Brown
- Major competitions: Miss USA 1990 (Winner); Miss Universe 1990 (1st Runner-Up)

Carole Anne-Marie Gist (born May 8, 1969) is an American television host, model and beauty pageant titleholder who was crowned Miss USA 1990. Gist was the first African American woman to win the Miss USA title.

Gist first won the title of Miss Michigan USA and went on to win the Miss USA crown on March 2, 1990, in Wichita, Kansas. The 1990 pageant had representatives from Georgia (Brenda Leithleiter), Alaska (Karin Elizabeth Meyer), Kentucky (Tiffany Tenfelde), South Carolina (Gina Tolleson, who as first runner-up then went on to represent the country at the Miss World pageant, winning the title) and Karin Hartz of New Jersey making up with Gist the Top 6 finalists. Gist, a 6 ft 0 in (183 cm) Detroit native, 20 years old at the time, eventually became first runner-up to Mona Grudt of Norway in the Miss Universe pageant of that same year. Her national costume was a flight attendant. She was also the first contestant from Michigan to win Miss USA, and broke the five-year streak of winners from Texas.

== Personal life ==
Gist is a graduate of Cass Technical High School in Detroit. At the time of her coronation, she was a junior marketing and management major at Northwood University at Midland, Michigan.
