= United High School (Laredo, Texas) =

Public school in Texas, United States

Location
- 2811 United Ave. Laredo, Texas, United States; 27.62522°N 99.46554°W

Information
- Type: Public
- Established: 1963
- School district: United Independent School District
- Staff: 224.51 (FTE)
- Grades: 9-12
- Enrollment: 3,644 (2022-23)
- Student to teacher ratio: 16.23
- Colors: Orange and white
- Mascot: Longhorn
- Website: uhs.uisd.net

United High School is a public high school located in the northern portion of Laredo, Texas, United States, and is a part of the United Independent School District. A new campus opened on August 24, 2009, for the 2009-2010 school year to alleviate overcrowding at the old campus. Freshman students have been placed in a new campus right next to the main campus. It is the most populated school in Laredo.

== Attendance boundary ==
Communities within the United High boundary include portions of Laredo and the following census-designated places:

- Bonanza Hills
- Botines
- Four Points
- La Moca Ranch
- Los Corralitos
- Los Minerales
- Los Huisaches
- Los Veteranos II
- Ranchos Penitas West
- Sunset Acres

== Feeder schools ==
Feeder middle schools include Elias Herrera Middle School, George Washington Middle School, and the newly established Juan Ramirez Middle School.

== Magnet school ==
United High School also houses the United Engineering & Technology Magnet, which has a robotics program.

== "The Protected School" ==
The school was built to contain civil defense facilities. United High School was the subject of a 1965 propaganda film issued by the Office of Civil Defense, "The Protected School".

== Notable alumni ==
- Steve Asmussen (Class of 1985), horse trainer and racer
- Ana Rodriguez (Miss Texas USA 2011)
- Edgar Valdez Villareal, captured drug lord for the Betran-Leyva Cartel
- Marco Antonio Flores
