= Miss Wyoming USA =

Beauty pageant competition

- Formation: 1952
- Type: Beauty pageant
- Headquarters: Savage
- Location: Minnesota
- Members: Miss USA
- Official language: English
- Key people: Denise Wallace; Craig Heitkamp
- Website: Official website

The Miss Wyoming USA competition is the pageant that selects the representative for the state Wyoming in the Miss USA pageant. It is, as of 2025, produced by Future Productions based in Savage, Minnesota since 2005.

Wyoming has placed twice in Miss USA (in 1986 and 2010), won five Miss Congeniality awards, and one Miss Photogenic award.

Six Miss Wyoming USAs have won the Miss Wyoming Teen USA title and competed at Miss Teen USA, six have competed at Miss America and two has competed at Miss America's Outstanding Teen.

Melanie San Roman of Austin, TX was appointed Miss Wyoming USA on July 30th, 2026 after the open casting call from Thomas Brodeur, the new owner of the national pageant. She will represent Wyoming at Miss USA 2026.

== Gallery of titleholders ==
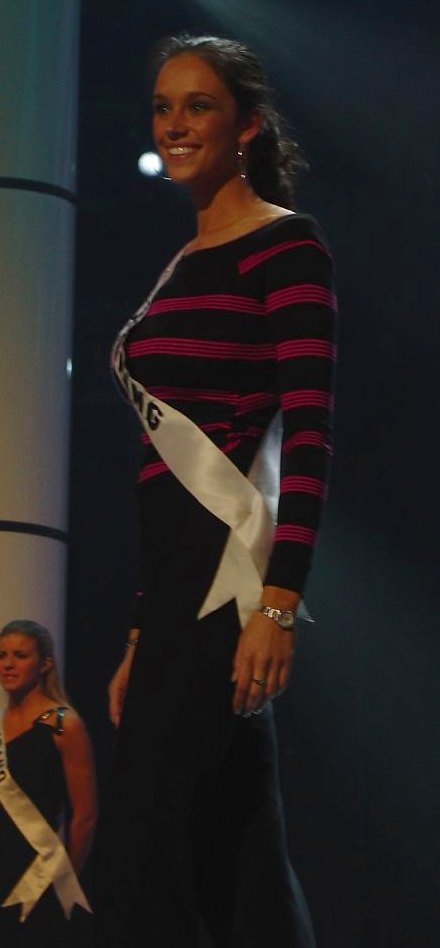
Katie Rudoff, Miss Wyoming USA 2004

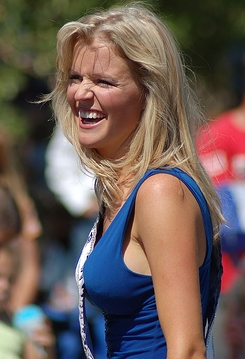
Kristin George, Miss Wyoming USA 2006

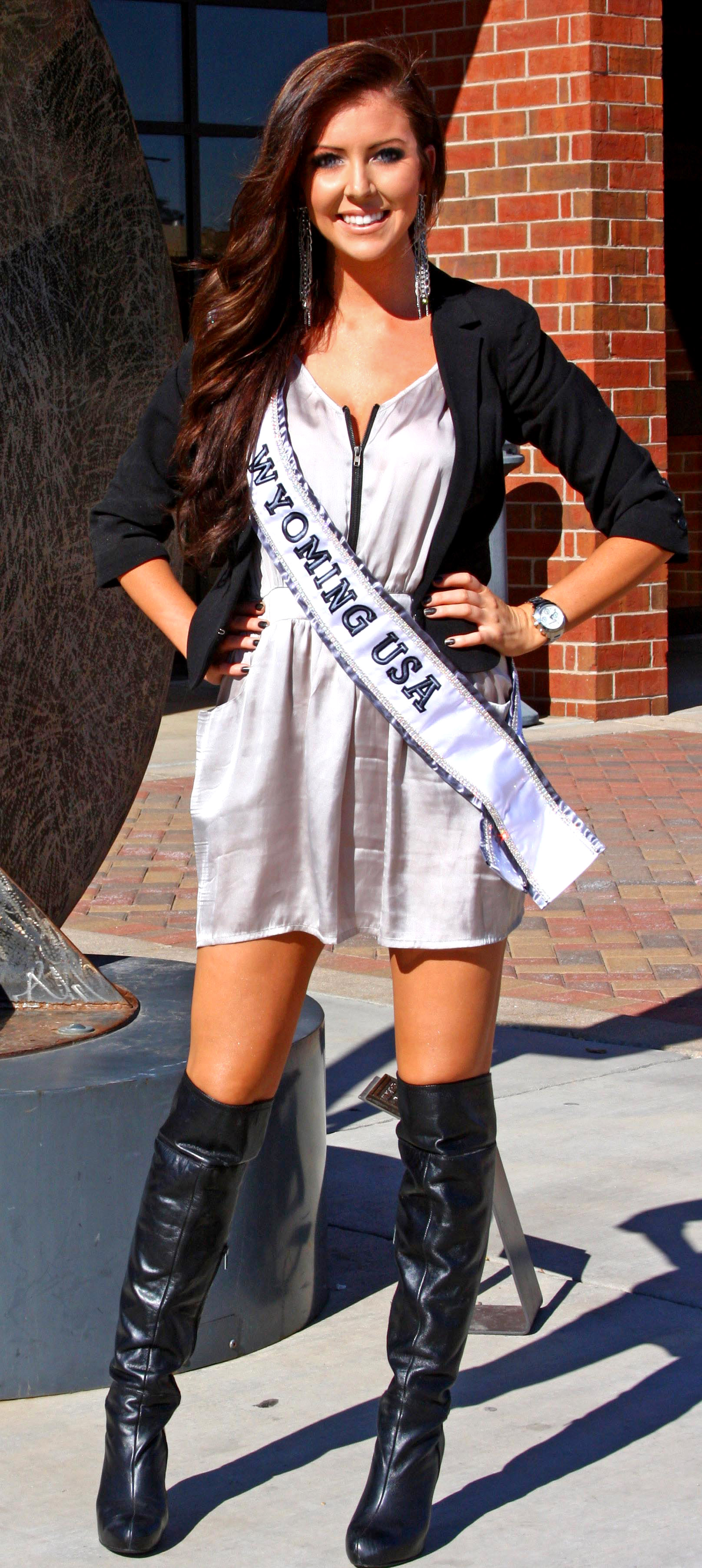
Holly Allen, Miss Wyoming USA 2012

== Results summary ==
=== Placements ===
- Top 10: Beth King (1986)
- Top 15: Claire Schreiner (2010)

Wyoming holds a record of 2 placements at Miss USA.

=== Awards ===
- Miss Congeniality: Linda Leafdale (1966), Pam Williams (1979), Cynthia Pate (2009), Mikaela Shaw (2017), Callie Bishop (2018)
- Miss Photogenic: Beth King (1986)

== Winners ==
Color key

- Declared winner
- Ended as runner-up
- Ended as one of the finalists or semifinalists

Year (Note: There were no events held in 1959, 1963 and 1964.)	Name	Hometown	Age (Note: Age at the time of the Miss USA pageant)	Local title	Placement at Miss USA	Special awards at Miss USA	Notes
2026	Melanie San Roman	Austin, TX	30	Miss Austin			
2025	Eilish Young	Spring, TX	29	Miss Belington			
2024	Mackenzie Rush	Sheridan	19	Miss Northeast Wyoming			
2023	Beck Bridger	Sheridan	27	Miss Sheridan County			Previously Miss Wyoming 2018
2022	Morgan McNally	Casper	27	Miss Central Wyoming			
2021	Mackenzie Kern	Casper	21				Previously Miss Wyoming Teen USA 2018
2020	Lexi Revelli	Lyman	26				Originally first runner-up, assumed the title after Katie Bozner's resignation and competed in Miss USA; Competed under the Miss USA system on her 9th consecutive year including two appearances in Teen and seven in Miss before assuming the title
2020	Caitlin "Katie" Bozner	Buffalo	24		did not compete		Resigned the title three weeks before the Miss USA 2020 pageant due to academic obligations
2019	Addison Treesh	Gillette	18				Youngest contestant competing for Miss USA 2019; Previously Miss Wyoming's Outstanding Teen 2014
2018	Callie Bishop	Casper	27			Miss Congeniality	Previously Miss Wyoming Teen USA 2008
2017	Mikaela Shaw	Casper	23			Miss Congeniality (tied with Miss Missouri USA 2017 Bayleigh Dayton)	Previously Miss Wyoming 2015; Contestant at National Sweetheart 2013
2016	Autumn Olson	Saratoga	21				Previously Miss Wyoming Teen USA 2013
2015	Caroline Scott	Cheyenne	22				Previously Miss Wyoming Teen USA 2010; Top 15 at Miss Teen USA 2010
2014	Lexi Hill	Gillette	20				
2013	Courtney Gifford	Sheridan	24				Triple Crown winner: Previously Miss Wyoming's Outstanding Teen 2005; Previously Miss Wyoming 2008; First woman to win Miss America's Outstanding Teen, Miss America and Miss USA state titles
2012	Holly Allen	Lander	23				Sister of Jessie Allen, Miss Wyoming 2014; Later Big Brother 21 runner-up
2011	Kaitlyn Davis	Laramie	20				
2010	Claire Schreiner	Gillette	23		Top 15		
2009	Cynthia Pate	Casper	22			Miss Congeniality	
2008	Cassie Shore	Casper	22				
2007	Robyn Johnson	Sheridan	22				
2006	Kristin George	Casper	24				Previously Miss Wyoming Teen USA 2000
2005	Abby Norman	Laramie	21				Miss Congeniality at National Sweetheart 2002
2004	Katie Rudoff	Green River	20				Previously Miss Wyoming Teen USA 1999
2003	Jamie Gorman	Cheyenne					
2002	Jeannie Crofts	Cheyenne					
2001	Heather Jackelen	Rock Springs					Later Miss Wyoming 2005 and Miss Galaxy 2007
2000	Rebecca Smith	Jackson Hole					
1999	Arnica Bryant	Cheyenne					
1998	Megan Starr Wigert	Cheyenne	22				
1997	Stacy Dawn Cenedese	Cheyenne					Previously Miss Wyoming 1992
1996	Kellee Nicole Kattleman	Laramie					
1995	Susan Elizabeth Shaffer	Cheyenne					
1994	Tolan Clark	Cheyenne					
1993	Leissann Marie Stolz	Cheyenne					
1992	Lisa Postle	Green River					
1991	Wendy Lee Dunn	Laramie					
1990	Cheryl James	Cheyenne					
1989	Chandra Anderson	Jackson					
1988	Kristen Youmans	Casper					
1987	Michelle Zimmermann	Recluse					
1986	Beth King	Cheyenne	22		Top 10	Miss Photogenic	
1985	Wendy Hartwigsen	Gillette					
1984	Cheryl Rawson	Laramie					
1983	Joanie Engstrom	Rawlins					
1982	Judy Lynn Wilder	Casper					
1981	Deborah Aspinwall	Riverton					
1980	Suzie Harris	Casper					
1979	Pam Williams	Casper				Miss Congeniality	
1978	Kathryn Flitner	Greybull					
1977	Michele Fisser	Cheyenne					
1976	Murlie Colosky	Laramie					
1975	Kimerli Jayne Pring	Cheyenne					Later Miss Wyoming 1978
1974	Debbie K. Petty	Rawlins					
1973	Michele Walter	Cheyenne					
1972	Tamara Tulley	Cheyenne					
1971	Mary Kay Heaton	Cheyenne					
1970	Elizabeth Swarthout	Sheridan					
1969	Pam Lewis	Cheyenne					
1968	Penny Smathers	Douglas					
1967	Helen M. Barker	Buffalo	20				Later participated in Miss Wyoming 1967
1966	Linda Leafdale	Thermopolis				Miss Congeniality	
1965	Linda Lou Peck	Sheridan					
1962	Ann Bonner	Powell			did not compete		Withdrew
1961	Judy Larae Walton	Cokeville					
1960	Anita Simon	Cheyenne					
1958	Dorothy Kochiras	Evanston					
1957	Marilyn Hawkins	Casper					
1956	Marilyn Scott	Cheyenne					
1955	Barbara Kaye Latta	Casper					
1954	Faith Radenbaugh	Heart Mountain					
1953	Nancy Rogers	Cheyenne					
