= Miss USA 1990 =

39th Miss USA pageant

- Date: March 2, 1990
- Presenters: Dick Clark; Leeza Gibbons; Laura Harring
- Venue: Century II Convention Center, Wichita, Kansas
- Broadcaster: CBS; KWCH
- Entrants: 51
- Placements: 12
- Winner: Carole Gist; Michigan
- Congeniality: Janet Tveita (Minnesota)
- Photogenic: Stephanie Teneyck (Mississippi)

Miss USA 1990 was the 39th Miss USA pageant, televised live from the Century II Convention Center in Wichita, Kansas on March 2, 1990. At the conclusion of the final competition, Carole Gist of Michigan was crowned by outgoing titleholder Gretchen Polhemus of Texas. Carole became the first African American winner ever and the first woman from Michigan to be crowned as Miss USA, ending the streak of "Texas Aces" from 1985.

For the first time, each judge's score was displayed to the audience, adding transparency to the process.

A major format change in 1990 transformed the Miss USA competition for the next decade: the delegates faced an extra round of elimination on finals night: the top six judges' questions.

Instead of reducing the top twelve to the usual final five, the judges picked an intermediate top six. Those six finalists answered questions from the judges, and the field was then reduced to a final three, who faced the traditional final question, adding unpredictability to the competition after five Texan Miss USA winners from GuyRex Associates, which would lose its Miss Texas USA franchise the next year.

The pageant was hosted by Dick Clark for the second of five times, with color commentary by Leeza Gibbons and Laura Harring, Miss USA 1985.

This was the first time the pageant was held in Wichita, where it would be staged for the next three years.

== Results ==
=== Placements ===
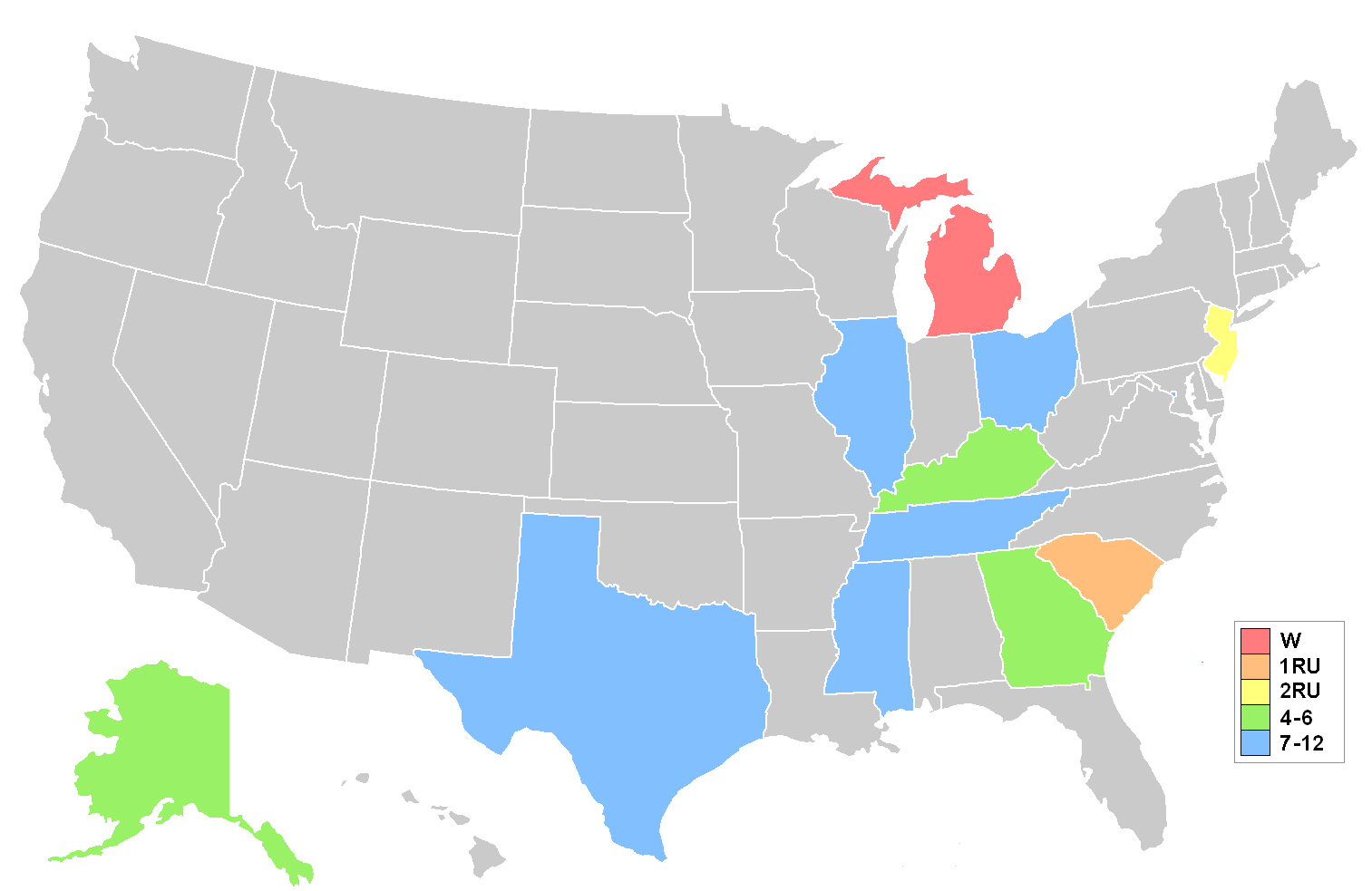
Map showing placements by state

Final results	Contestant
Miss USA 1990	Michigan – Carole Gist
1st Runner-Up	South Carolina – Gina Tolleson
2nd Runner-Up	New Jersey – Karin Hartz
Top 6	Alaska – Karin Meyer; Georgia – Brenda Leithleiter; Kentucky – Tiffany Tenfelde
Top 12	District of Columbia – Catherine Staples; Illinois – Karla Myers; Mississippi – Stephanie Teneyck; Ohio – Melissa Proctor; Tennessee – Charita Moses; Texas – Stephanie Kuehne

=== Special awards ===
Award	Contestant
Miss Congeniality	Minnesota – Janet Tveita
Miss Photogenic	Mississippi – Stephanie Teneyck

== Delegates ==
The Miss USA 1990 delegates were:

- Alabama – Natalie Moore
- Alaska – Karin Meyer
- Arizona – Leslie Leonard
- Arkansas – Kathryn Grace Harris
- California - Cynthia Nelson
- Colorado – Michelle Harrison
- Connecticut – Allison Dawn Barbeau-Diorio
- Delaware – Nicci Dent
- (Washington, D.C.) District of Columbia – Catherine Staples
- Florida – Tricia Hahn
- (Georgia (U.S. state)) Georgia – Brenda Leithleiter
- Hawaii – Leimomi Bacalso
- Idaho – Cynthia Estey
- Illinois – Karla Myers
- Indiana – Meri Lyn Muker
- Iowa – Elizabeth Meulhaupt
- Kansas – Rebecca Porter
- Kentucky – Tiffany Tenfelde
- Louisiana – Jeanne Burns
- Maine – Leigh Bubar
- Maryland – Julie Stanford
- Massachusetts – Laureen Murphy
- Michigan – Carole Gist
- Minnesota – Janet Tveita
- Mississippi – Stephanie Teneyck
- Missouri – Lori Suschnick
- Montana – Kimberlee Burger
- Nebraska – Angela Humphrey
- Nevada – Michele Yegee
- New Hampshire – Lisa Purnpichate
- New Jersey – Karin Hartz
- New Mexico – Larissa Canaday
- (New York (state)) New York – Patricia Murphy
- North Carolina – Altman Allen
- North Dakota – Kari Larson
- Ohio – Melissa Proctor
- Oklahoma – Lauralynn Norton
- Oregon – Elizabeth Michaud
- Pennsylvania – Elizabeth Cook
- Rhode Island – Susan Lima
- South Carolina – Gina Tolleson
- South Dakota – Valerie Sejnoha
- Tennessee – Charita Moses
- Texas – Stephanie Keuhne
- Utah – Debra Linn Tingey
- Vermont – Stephanie Bessey
- Virginia – Evelyn Green
- (Washington (state)) Washington – Melissa Dickson
- West Virginia – Sabrina Anderson
- Wisconsin – Lynn Marie Mulcahy
- Wyoming – Cheryl James

== Judges ==
- Eileen Fulton
- Kerry Gordy
- Rebecca Brandewyne
- Robin Cousins
- Barbara Peterson
- Dan Isaacson
- Dr. Irene Kassorla
- Jackie Joyner Kersee
- Randy Stone
- Judi Sheppard Missett
- Gordon Cooper
