= Miss Georgia USA =

Beauty pageant competition

- Formation: 1952
- Type: Beauty pageant
- Headquarters: Collierville
- Location: Tennessee
- Members: Miss USA
- Official language: English
- Key people: Kimberly Payne Greenwood, State Pageant Director
- Website: Official website

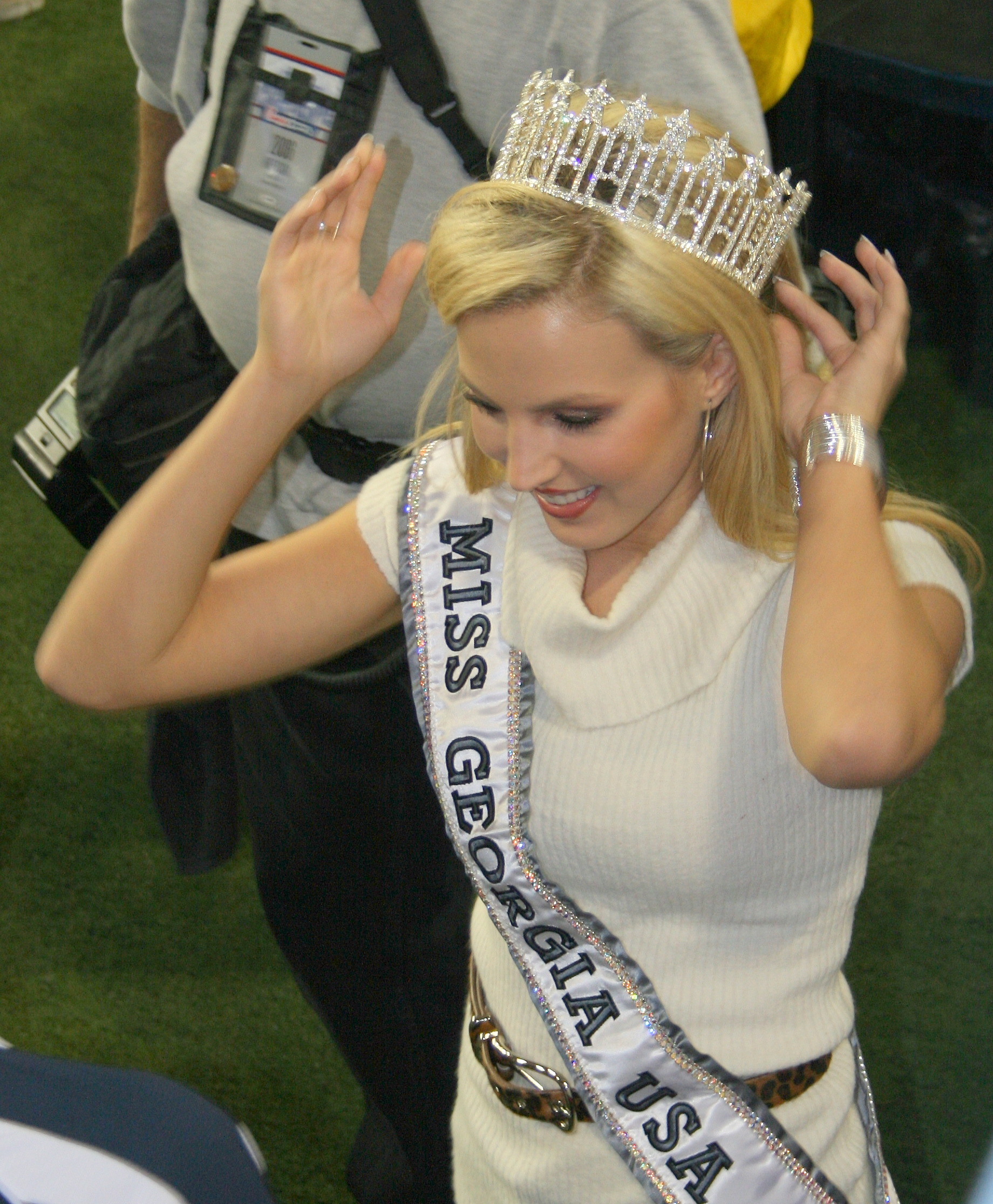
Brittany Swann, Miss Georgia USA 2007, at the Peach Bowl

The Miss Georgia USA competition is the pageant that selects the representative for the state of Georgia in the Miss USA pageant. This pageant is directed Greenwood Productions under the ownership of Miss Tennessee USA 1989 Kimberly Payne Greenwood and it is hosted in McDonough, Georgia.

Georgia has had a fair success at Miss USA, and has yet to win the title. The best placement was Erin Nance, who placed 1st runner-up in 1993, and many 2nd and 4th runner-ups. The most recent placement was Savannah Miles in 2025, placing Top 10.

Seven former Miss Georgia Teen USAs went on to win this competition, but only three titleholders has previously competed at Miss America. One represented Connecticut.

In 2025, Miss Buckhead 2025 Bella Bautista became the first openly transgender woman enlisted to compete in the pageant, but she later withdrew from the competition.

The current Miss Georgia USA is Jade Kircus of Southside, AL who was appointed on June 30, 2026 after the open casting call from Thomas Brodeur, the new owner of the national pageant. She will represent Georgia at the Miss USA 2026.

== Results summary ==
- 1st runner-up: Erin Nance (1993)
- 2nd runners-up: Tami Tesch (1986), Donna Rampy (1988), Tiffany Fallon (2001), Lisa Wilson (2006), Tiana Griggs (2014), Emanii Davis (2016)
- 3rd runner-up: Dorothy Taylor (1959)
- 4th runners-up: Carolann Connor (1955), Diane Austin (1958), Cherie Stephens (1970), Sophia Bowen (1987), Michele Nemeth (1989), Jasmyn "Jazz" Wilkins (2012)
- Top 5/6: Brenda Leithleiter (1990), Jennifer Prodgers (1992), Patti Dunn (2000)
- Top 10/12: Liz Wickersham (1976), Linda Kerr (1977), Lisa Condre (1981), Dotsy Timm (1983), Caroline Medley (2004), Marianny Egurrola (2018), Savannah Miles (2025)
- Top 15/16: Kimberly Gittings (2009), Kaylin Reque (2011), Alyssa Beasley (2020)

Georgia holds a record of 27 placements at Miss USA.

=== Awards ===
- Miss Photogenic: Liz Wickersham (1976), Sophia Bowen (1987)

== Titleholders ==
Color key

- Winner
- Runner-up or Finalist
- Semifinalist

Year	Name	Hometown	Age	Local title	Placement at Miss USA	Special awards at Miss USA	Notes
2026	Jade Kircus	Southside, AL	36				
2025	Savannah Miles	Atlanta	24	Miss GA South	Top 10		Previously Miss Georgia Teen USA 2018; Top 10 at Miss Teen USA 2018
2024	Emmaline Farmer	Winder	24	Miss Northeast GA			
2023	Rachel Russaw	Atlanta	24	Miss GA South			
2022	Holly Haynes	Sugar Hill	26	Miss Coastal GA			Shortest reigning Miss Georgia USA at 8 months and 24 days
2021	Cora Griffen	Columbus	24	Miss GA South			Later Miss Grand USA 2024
2020	Alyssa Beasley	Brunswick	22	Miss GA South	Top 16		Previously Miss Georgia 2017 and top 12 at Miss America 2018 pageant; Longest reigning Miss Georgia USA at 1 year, 2 months and 28 days
2019	Katerina Rozmajzl	Atlanta	21	Miss Fulton Co.			
2018	Marianny Egurrola	Buford	25	Miss Heart of Gwinnett	Top 10		Born in Colombia; Niece of Miss Colombia 1988 María Teresa Egurrola; Later Miss Intercontinental USA 2018 and top 20 at Miss Intercontinental 2018
2017	DeAnna Johnson	Hazlehurst	20	Miss Central East GA			Contestant on season 8 of The Voice
2016	Emanii Davis	Griffin	22	Miss Spalding Co.	2nd Runner-Up		Later Miss Georgia World 2017; Later Miss Earth United States 2019, 1st runner-up at Miss Earth 2019 representing Air award
2015	Brooke Fletcher	Peachtree City	23	Miss Peachtree City			Previously Miss Georgia Teen USA 2009 and 1st runner-up at Miss Teen USA 2009
2014	Tiana Griggs	Monticello	26	Miss Monticello	2nd Runner-Up		
2013	Brittany Sharp	Atlanta	22	Miss Central Atlanta			Previously Miss Georgia Teen USA 2006 and 4th runner-up at Miss Teen USA 2006
2012	Jasmyn "Jazz" Wilkins	Atlanta	22	Miss Johns Creek	4th Runner-Up		Daughter of Gerald Wilkins, niece of Dominique Wilkins, and sister of Damien Wilkins.
2011	Kaylin Reque	Suwanee	22	Miss Suwanee	Top 16		Atlanta Thrashers' Blue Crew member
2010	Cassady Lance	Savannah	25	Miss Coastal Georgia			Previously Miss Georgia Teen USA 2003
2009	Kimberly Gittings	Lilburn	20	Miss Greater Lilburn	Top 15		
2008	Amanda Kozak	Warner Robins	23	Miss Warner Robins			Previously Miss Georgia 2006 and Miss America 2007 2nd runner-up; 1st runner-up to National Sweetheart 2005
2007	Brittany Swann	Tyrone	23	Miss Peachtree City			
2006	Lisa Wilson	Rome	26	Miss Rome	2nd Runner-Up		Contestant on season 3 of American Idol, finished as semifinalist
2005	Tanisha Brito	Dunwoody	24				Previously Miss Connecticut 2002 and top 10 at Miss America 2003
2004	Caroline Medley	Suwanee	26		Top 10		
2003	Erin Haney	Atlanta	21				
2002	Heather Hogan	Duluth	21				
2001	Tiffany Fallon	Duluth	26		2nd Runner-Up		Playboy Playmate of the Year for 2005, contestant on The Celebrity Apprentice.
2000	Patti Dunn	Duluth	24		Top 5		
1999	Meredith Young		25				Previously Miss Georgia Teen USA 1991 and 1st Runner-Up at Miss Teen USA 1991
1998	Edlyn Lewis		24				
1997	Denesha Reed	McDonough	22				Previously Miss Georgia Teen USA 1993 and top 6 at Miss Teen USA 1993
1996	Jenny Craig						Later Mrs. Texas America 2004 and Mrs. Photogenic at the Mrs. America 2004 pageant under her married name, Jennifer Palmieri.
1995	Paulette Schier	Atlanta	23				Winner of Miss Oktoberfest 1995, Miss Teen All American 1990
1994	Andrea Moore	Atlanta					
1993	Erin Nance	Calhoun	21		1st Runner-Up		Previously Miss Georgia Teen USA 1988, 2nd runner up at Miss Oktoberfest 1994, Miss Teen All American 1991
1992	Jennifer Prodgers	Atlanta	23		Top 6		1st runner up at Miss Oktoberfest 1992
1991	Tamara Rhoads	Marietta	23				
1990	Brenda Leithleiter		22		Top 6		Miss Flower Queen 1990
1989	Michele Nemeth	Lilburn	24		4th Runner-Up		1st Runner-Up at Miss Oktoberfest 1989, was USA representative in Miss Maja International 1984 but did not place. Daughter of Miss Maryland USA 1959
1988	Donna Rampy	Atlanta	24		2nd Runner-Up		Semi-finalist in Miss Asia Pacific Quest 1988 as Miss USA
1987	Sophia Bowen	Marietta	21		4th Runner-Up	Miss Photogenic	
1986	Tami Tesh	Hephzibah	21		2nd Runner-Up		2nd Runner-Up at Miss Oktoberfest 1986
1985	Amanda Smith	Smyrna	24				Mother of Miss Tennessee 2024, Carley Jaymes Vogel
1984	Jayne "Jaynie" Poteet	Norcross	19				Miss Oktoberfest 1987
1983	Dotsy Timm	Augusta			Top 12		
1982	Kelly Blackston	Savannah					
1981	Lisa Condre	Atlanta			Top 12		
1980	April Reid	Augusta					Future Wheel of Fortune hostess Vanna White placed 4th runner-up in this pageant
1979	Debbie Freeman	Morrow					
1978	Larinda Matthews	Marietta					
1977	Linda Kerr	Alpharetta			Top 12		
1976	Liz Wickersham	Atlanta			Top 12	Miss Photogenic	
1975	Diana Goodman	Forest Park					
1974	Vicki Ross	Warner Robins					
1973	Melanie Chapman	Atlanta					
1972	Kaye Ayers	Atlanta					
1971	Jenny Lynn Andrews	Atlanta					
1970	Cherie Stephens	Tucker			4th Runner-Up		
1969	Judy Lyons	Atlanta	18				
1968	Midge Ivie						
1967	Jane Lineberger						
1966	Flora Goddard	Atlanta					
1965	Judy Simpson						
1964	Lynda Tatum						
1963	Brenda Jean Seagraves						
1962	Genelda Odum	Odum					Competed in the 1963 Miss Dixie Pageant
1961	Patsy Giddens						
1960	Cecilia Upton	Rockmart					
1959	Dorothy Taylor				3rd Runner-Up		
1958	Diane Austin				4th Runner-Up		
1957	Ruth Lycan						
1956	Mary Ruff						
1955	Carolann Conno				4th Runner-Up		
1953-54	No representative						
1952	Betty Jane Wood						Successor to Rosemarie Bowe
1952	Rosemarie Bowe				did not compete		Resigned

^{1} Age at the time of the Miss USA pageant
