= Liz Wickersham =

American television personality

- Occupations: Television writer, television producer

Liz Wickersham is an American television personality best known as the host of CNN's entertainment newsmagazine Showbiz Today and host of WTBS's Award-Winning Magazine Program, Good News.

== Miss Georgia USA ==
Wickersham, who grew up in Orange, Texas, moved to Georgia after attending the University of Texas and won the title of Miss Georgia USA, going on to compete in the 1976 Miss USA pageant, where she was selected as Miss Photogenic and ultimately became one of the Top 12 semifinalists. Following this, she briefly worked for Democratic Congressman Charlie Wilson in Washington, D.C. Her father was both a major Democratic contributor and the seller of the second-hand Lincoln automobiles that Wilson preferred. She later appeared as the cover model for the April 1981 issue of Playboy magazine.

== CNN ==
Shortly thereafter, Ted Turner offered her an on-air position with the fledgling network, CNN. Her broadcasting profile soon rose considerably after being selected in to interview Cuban President Fidel Castro at the presidential palace in Havana following an invitation he issued to CNN. She returned to Cuba for a follow-up interview with Castro two years later. Liz Wickersham co-hosted the CNN program Showbiz Today (modeled on syndication's successful Entertainment Tonight) which featured entertainment industry news. She also served as the host of WTBS's Sunday-morning magazine program "Good News", produced by the husband-and-wife TV writing team of Bonnie and Terry Turner.

== Personal life ==
Wickersham was married for 27 years to Paul Dudley Derounian, Manhattan Attorney and Vietnam War Veteran, who died suddenly and peacefully in his sleep on Sunday July 27, 2014, at his summer home in Westhampton, NY.

Awards and achievements
Preceded by Diana Goodman	Miss Georgia USA; 1976	Succeeded by Linda Kerr
