= Miss USA 1987 =

36th Miss USA pageant

- Date: February 17, 1987
- Presenters: Bob Barker; Mary Frann
- Entertainment: Chuck Connors; The Kirtland Air Force Saber Drill Team; The Naval Air Training Command Choir
- Venue: Tingley Coliseum, Albuquerque, New Mexico
- Broadcaster: CBS, KRQE
- Entrants: 52
- Placements: 11
- Winner: Michelle Royer; Texas
- Congeniality: Lori Lynn Dickerson (California)
- Photogenic: Sophia Marie Bowen (Georgia)

Miss USA 1987 was the 36th Miss USA pageant, televised live on February 17 from Albuquerque, New Mexico on CBS. The ceremonies were hosted for the last time by Bob Barker. At the conclusion of the final competition, Michelle Royer of Texas was crowned Miss USA, becoming the third consecutive winner from Texas.

== Results ==
=== Placements ===
Final results	Contestant
Miss USA 1987	Texas – Michelle Royer
1st Runner-up	Florida – Cloe Cabrera
2nd Runner-up	Arizona – Diane Martin
3rd Runner-up	Missouri – Dawn Fonseca
4th Runner-up	(Georgia (U.S. state)) Georgia – Sophia Bowen
Top 11	Mississippi – Katharine Manning; New Mexico – Kriston Killgore; Illinois – Joan Berge; Nevada – Tammy Perkins; West Virginia – Paula Morrison; Virginia – Marsha Ralls

=== Special awards ===
- Congeniality: Lori Lynn Dickerson (California)
- Photogenic: Sophia Bowen (Georgia)
- Best State Costume: Kriston Gayle Killgore (New Mexico)

== Delegates ==
The Miss USA 1987 delegates were:

- Alabama – Rhonda Garrett
- Alaska – Shelly Dunlevy
- Arizona – Diane Lynn Martin
- Arkansas – Sheri Smeltzer
- California – Lori Lynn Dickerson
- Colorado – Polly Kuska
- Connecticut – Jolene Foy
- Delaware – Shellie Haralson
- District of Columbia – Edwina Richard
- Florida – Clotilde "Cloe" Helen Cabrera
- Georgia – Sophia Marie Bowen
- Hawaii – Deborah Laslo
- Idaho – Vicki Hoffman
- Illinois – Joan Elizabeth Berge
- Indiana – Alecia Rae Masalkoski
- Iowa – Katy Lynn Magee
- Kansas – Martina Castle
- Kentucky – Beth Ann Clark
- Louisiana – Carol Carter
- Maine – Ginger Kilgore
- Maryland – Michelle Snow
- Massachusetts – Rosanna Iversen
- Michigan – Elizabeth Puleo
- Minnesota – Christine Rosenberger
- Mississippi – Katharine Clare Manning
- Missouri – Dawn Theresa Fonseca
- Montana – Constance Colla
- Nebraska – Amy Anderson
- Nevada – Tammy Lee Perkins
- New Hampshire – Laurie Durkee
- New Jersey – Stacey Fox
- New Mexico – Kriston Gayle Killgore
- New York – Constance McCullough
- North Carolina – Donna Wilson
- North Dakota – Shelley Gangness
- Ohio – Hallie Bonnell
- Oklahoma – Dyan Rody
- Oregon – Tamara Primiano
- Pennsylvania – Lisa Rynkiewicz
- Rhode Island – Lisa Benson
- South Carolina – Elizabeth Woodard
- South Dakota – Jana van Woudenberg
- Tennessee – Molly Brown
- Texas – Michelle Renee Royer
- Utah – Patty Thorpe
- Vermont – Carole Woodworth
- Virginia – Marsha Ann Ralls
- Washington – Jennifer Doerflinger
- West Virginia – Paula Jean Morrison
- Wisconsin – Regina Maria Part
- Wyoming – Michelle Renee Zimermann
- Miss Teen USA 1986 – Allison Brown (Oklahoma)

== Judges ==
- Rebeca Arthur
- Doug Higgins
- Betty Hyatt Aidman
- Rhett Turner
- Lisa Brown
- Marc Schwartz
- Caryn Richman
- Dick Zimmerman
- Kim Morgan Greene
- Gwen Jones
- Fred Travalena

== Controversy ==
Host Bob Barker, a fervent animal rights activist, threatened to pull out of the pageant when he discovered that the delegates would be wearing real fur coats during the swimsuit competition segment. As Barker was already in New Mexico at the time, there was no time to find a replacement host and pageant officials agreed to a change. The delegates wore simulated fur for the segment, but real fur was still given as a prize to the Miss USA winner. Barker went on to host the 1987 Miss Universe pageant held in Singapore in May before stepping down for good.

== See also ==
- Miss Universe 1987
- Miss Teen USA 1987
