= Christy Fichtner =

American actress and beauty queen

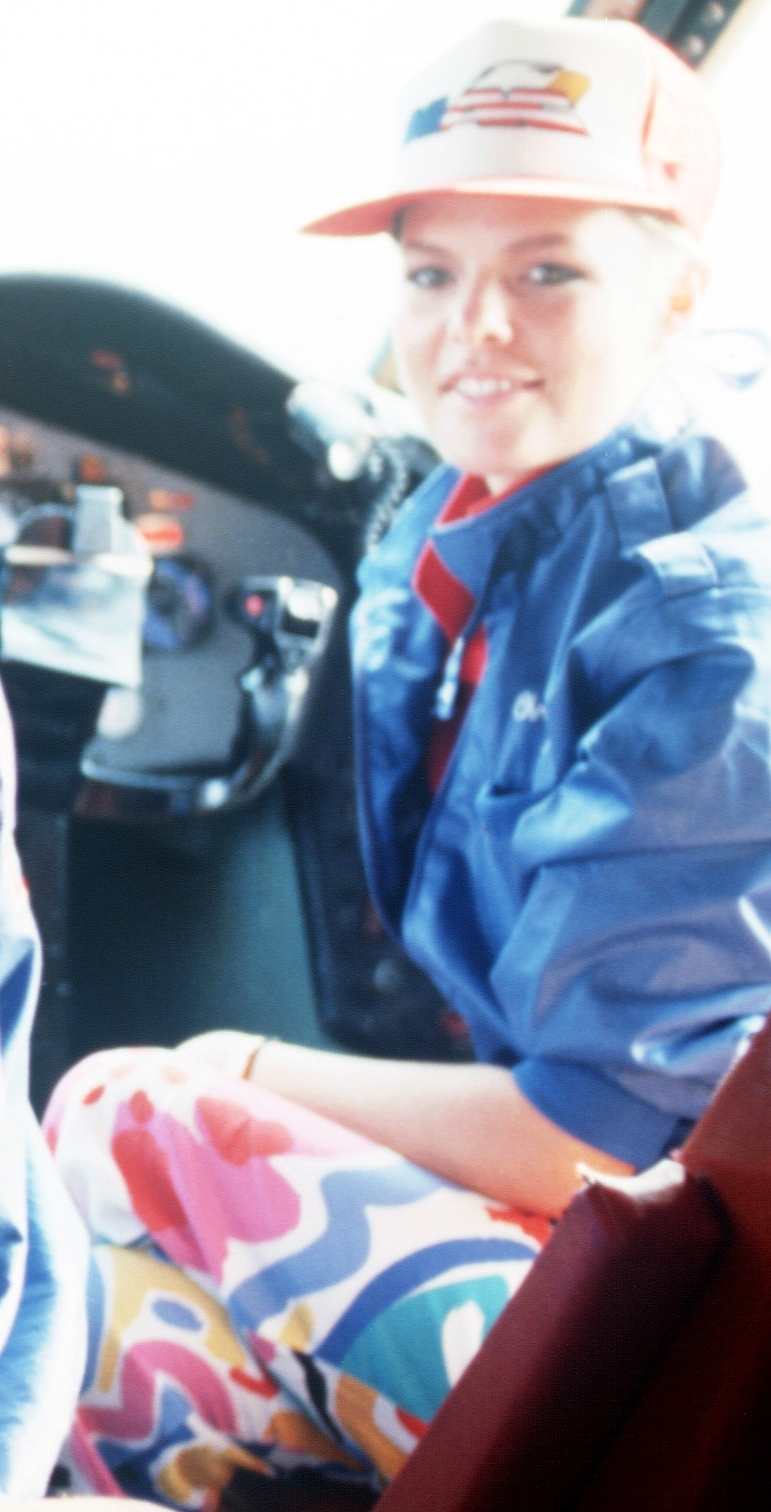
- Born: Dallas, Texas, U.S.
- Other names: Christy Fichtner-Alhadef; Christy Alhadef
- Height: 1.73 m (5 ft 8 in)
- Spouse: Gary E. Alhadef (m. 1988–1998)
- Children: 3
- Beauty pageant titleholder
- Title: Miss Texas USA 1986; Miss USA 1986
- Hair color: Blonde
- Eye color: Green
- Major competitions: Miss Texas USA 1986; (Winner); Miss USA 1986; (Winner); Miss Universe 1986; (1st Runner-Up)

Christy Fichtner (born October 28, 1962) is an American actress and beauty pageant titleholder who was crowned Miss USA 1986. As Miss USA, Fichtner represented the United States at Miss Universe 1986 and finished as the first runner-up.

== Early life and education ==
She attended Greenwich High School in Connecticut where she was the girlfriend of future Pro Football Hall of Famer Steve Young. She moved to Dallas, enrolling at Southern Methodist University.

== Career ==
=== Pageants ===
As a beauty queen, she was crowned Miss Texas USA and Miss USA 1986, becoming the second of five consecutive winners from Texas during the 1980s. Her main competition and eventual first runner-up at Miss USA was actress Halle Berry.

At the 1986 Miss Universe pageant held in July 1986 in Panama City, Panama, Fichtner placed first in the preliminary competition, third in semifinal interview, first in swimsuit and second in evening gown, which allowed her to advance as one of the Top 5 finalists of the competition, finishing her participation in Miss Universe 1986 as first runner-up to eventual winner, Bárbara Palacios Teyde of Venezuela. Her national costume was a cowgirl.

=== After Miss USA ===
In 2003, she starred in the reality television show Who Wants to Marry My Dad?, where she was the runner-up.

After Hurricane Wilma damaged Cancún and its infrastructure in 2005, Fichtner, a frequent traveler to the area, revisited the tourist location in an effort to promote tourism: "The Cancún we love needs to be visited by Texans in order to return to what it once was."

== Personal life ==
A longtime Dallasite, Fichtner married Dallas dentist Gary E. Alhadef in October 1988, with whom she has 3 sons. They later divorced.

Awards and achievements
| Preceded by (Spain) Teresa Sánchez López | Miss Universe 1st runner-up 1986 | Succeeded by (Italy) Roberta Capua |
| Preceded by Laura Martinez-Herring | Miss USA; 1986 | Succeeded by Michelle Royer |
| Preceded by Laura Martinez-Herring | Miss Texas USA; 1986 | Succeeded by Michelle Royer |
