= Miss USA 1977 =

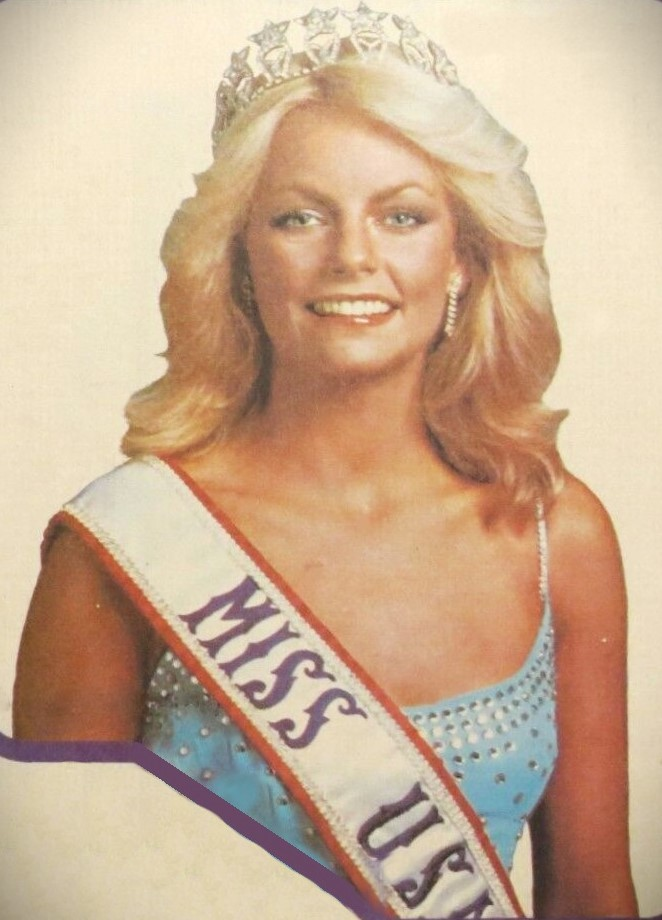
- Kimberly Tomes as Miss USA
- Date: May 14, 1977
- Presenters: Bob Barker and Helen O'Connell
- Entertainment: Bobby Vinton
- Venue: Gillard Municipal Auditorium, Charleston, South Carolina
- Broadcaster: CBS, WCSC-TV
- Entrants: 51
- Placements: 12
- Winner: Kimberly Tomes; Texas

Miss USA 1977 was the 26th Miss USA pageant, televised live by CBS from the Gillard Municipal Auditorium in Charleston, South Carolina on May 14, 1977.

The pageant was won by Kimberly Tomes of Texas, who was crowned by outgoing titleholder Barbara Peterson of Minnesota. Tomes was the first woman from Texas to win the Miss USA title, and went on to place as a semi-finalist at Miss Universe 1977.

== Results ==
Final results	Contestant
Miss USA 1977	Texas – Kimberly Tomes
1st Runner-Up	Nevada – Mary O'Neal Contino
2nd Runner-Up	Minnesota – Deborah Cossette
3rd Runner-Up	California –Pamela Gergely
4th Runner-Up	Virginia – Lynn Herring
Top 12	Arizona – Toni Abranovic; (Washington, D.C.) District of Columbia – Sharon Sutherland; (Georgia (U.S. state)) Georgia – Linda Kerr; Hawaii – Cely de Castro; Maine – Tina Brown; New Jersey – Juanita McCarty; New Mexico – Denise Funderburk

== Delegates ==
The Miss USA 1977 delegates were:

- Alabama – Cheryl Burgess
- Alaska – Edith Baker
- Arizona – Toni Abranovic
- Arkansas – Debra Lynn Duree
- California - Pamela Gergely
- Colorado – Mary Anne Genzel
- Connecticut – Susan Crone
- Delaware – Debby Faulkner
- (Washington, D.C.) District of Columbia – Sharon Sutherland
- Florida – Linda LeFevre
- (Georgia (U.S. state)) Georgia – Linda Kerr
- Hawaii – Cely de Castro
- Idaho – Leslie Kington
- Illinois – Elizabeth Curran
- Indiana – Lynn Flaherty
- Iowa – Cindy Woodard
- Kansas – Sherry Brane
- Kentucky – Sandra Kay Smith
- Louisiana – Patti Rosenbalm
- Maine – Tina Brown
- Maryland – Twyla Littleton
- Massachusetts – Carolyn Marcil
- Michigan – Jennifer Pinks
- Minnesota – Deborah Cossette
- Mississippi – Leigh Tapley
- Missouri – Connie Ast
- Montana – Theresa Rose Bajt
- Nebraska – Debbie Ridge
- Nevada – Mary O'Neal Contino
- New Hampshire – Belinda Bridgeman
- New Jersey – Juanita McCarty
- New Mexico – Denise Funderburk
- (New York (state)) New York – Deborah Martin
- North Carolina – Vikki Verbyla
- North Dakota – Barbara Redlin
- Ohio – Lesa Rummell
- Oklahoma – Kathy Malchar
- Oregon – Charisse Charlton
- Pennsylvania – Lorraine Lincoski
- Rhode Island – Susan Carten
- South Carolina – Pamela Lorraine Hoover
- South Dakota – Ginger Thomson
- Tennessee – Rene Jean Smith
- Texas – Kimberly Tomes
- Utah – Michele Miner
- Vermont – Anne Kent
- Virginia – Lynn Herring
- (Washington (state)) Washington – Ivy Lynn Reed
- West Virginia – Pat Brown
- Wisconsin – Vicki Payne
- Wyoming – Michele Fisser

== Judges ==
- James Bacon – columnist
- Summer Bartholomew – Miss USA 1975 from California
- Gen. Mark W. Clark – United States Army four-star general
- Larry Csonka – NFL running back
- Eileen Ford – Ford Agency founder
- Dong Kingman – artist
- Greg Morris – actor
- June Posen – cosmetics executive
- Omar Sharif – actor
- Jack Walsh – journalist
