= Miss USA 1966 =

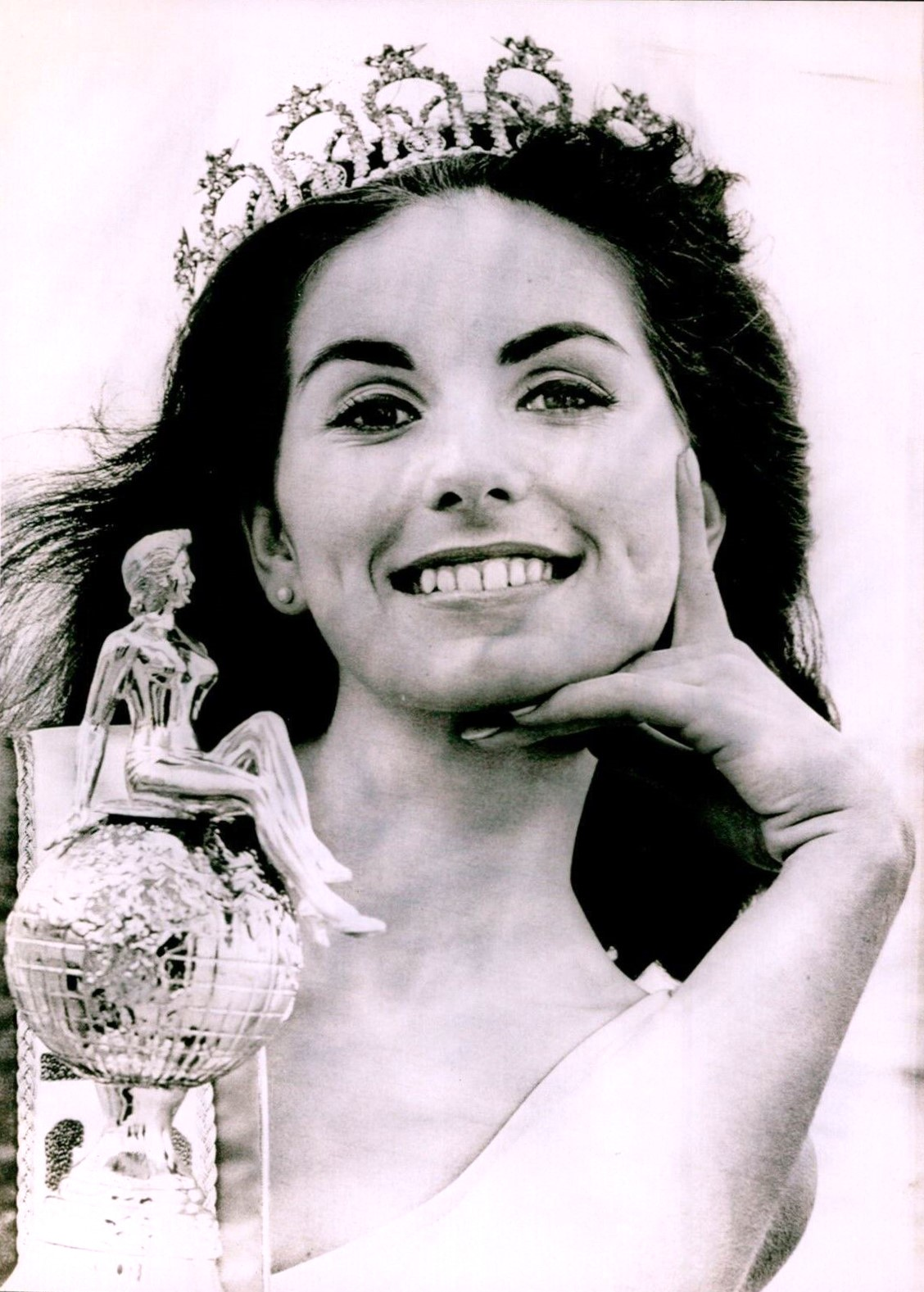
- Maria Remenyi wearing the Miss USA 1966 crown
- Date: May 21, 1966
- Presenters: Jack Linkletter; Pat Boone; June Lockhart
- Venue: Miami Beach, Florida
- Broadcaster: CBS, WTVJ
- Entrants: 49
- Placements: 15
- Withdrawals: Idaho, South Dakota
- Winner: Maria Remenyi; California

Miss USA 1966 was the 15th Miss USA pageant, televised live from Miami Beach, Florida, on May 21, 1966, co-hosted by Pat Boone and June Lockhart with Jack Linkletter as the emcee. This was the first-ever color telecast of the Miss USA pageant.

The pageant was won by Maria Remenyi of California, who was crowned by outgoing titleholder Sue Downey of Ohio. Remenyi was the second woman from California to win the Miss USA title, and went on to Top 15 at Miss Universe 1966.

Idaho and South Dakota did not send a delegate in 1966, making this the last Miss USA pageant in which not all states were represented The only subsequent pageant with fewer than 51 delegates in the live telecast – 1981 – resulted from a state representative being disqualified during the preliminary judging.

== Results ==
Final results	Contestant
Miss USA 1966	California – Maria Remenyi
1st Runner-Up	Connecticut – Pat Denne
2nd Runner-Up	Indiana – Elaine Richards
3rd Runner-Up	North Dakota – Judy Slayton
4th Runner-Up	Florida - Randy Beard

== Delegates ==
The Miss USA 1966 delegates were:

- Alabama – Susan Scott
- Alaska – Elrita Blankensop
- Arizona – Roxanne Neeley
- Arkansas – Peggy Jones
- California - Maria Remenyi
- Colorado – Rosemary Barnwell
- Connecticut – Pat Denne
- Delaware – Jacqueline Kalazinskas
- (Washington, D.C.) District of Columbia – Sue Counts
- Florida – Randy Beard
- (Georgia (U.S. state)) Georgia – Flora Goddard
- Hawaii – Judith Anne Wolski
- Idaho – N/A
- Illinois – Cheryl Setser
- Indiana – Elaine Richards
- Iowa – Janis Mieras
- Kansas – Pat Ravenscroft
- Kentucky – Jennifer Burcham
- Louisiana – Tanya Becnel
- Maine – Susan Bartash
- Maryland – Roselaine Zetter
- Massachusetts – Nancy Brackett
- Michigan – Kathlene Blascak
- Minnesota – Patricia Thatcher
- Mississippi – Jane Sutherland
- Missouri – Martha Taylor
- Montana – Carol Boetcher
- Nebraska – Karen Weinfurtner
- Nevada – Mary Martin
- New Hampshire – Elaine Brandt
- New Jersey – Jo Ann Franchi
- New Mexico – Susan Franz
- (New York (state)) New York – Nancy Self
- North Carolina – Brenda Moye
- North Dakota – Judy Slayton
- Ohio – Karen Dietz
- Oklahoma – Melva Brown
- Oregon – Sharon Gerritz
- Pennsylvania – Barbara Levitt
- Rhode Island – Barbara Williams
- South Carolina – Joselyn Alarie
- South Dakota – N/A
- Tennessee – Mary Margaret Smith
- Texas – Dorothy Pickens
- Utah – Denice Blair
- Vermont – Peggy Eckert
- Virginia – Dev Johnson
- (Washington (state)) Washington – Sandra Carlile
- West Virginia – Annette Peery
- Wisconsin – Janet Driscoll
- Wyoming – Linda Leafdale

== Judges ==
- Frank Sutton – actor
- George Lindsey – actor, comedian
- Hy Gardner – columnist
- Bert Bacharach – columnist
- Robert Cummings – actor
- Jon Whitcomb – magazine artist
- Brian Kelly – actor
- Allen Reisner – television director
- Gloria DeHaven – actress
