= Maria Remenyi =

American model

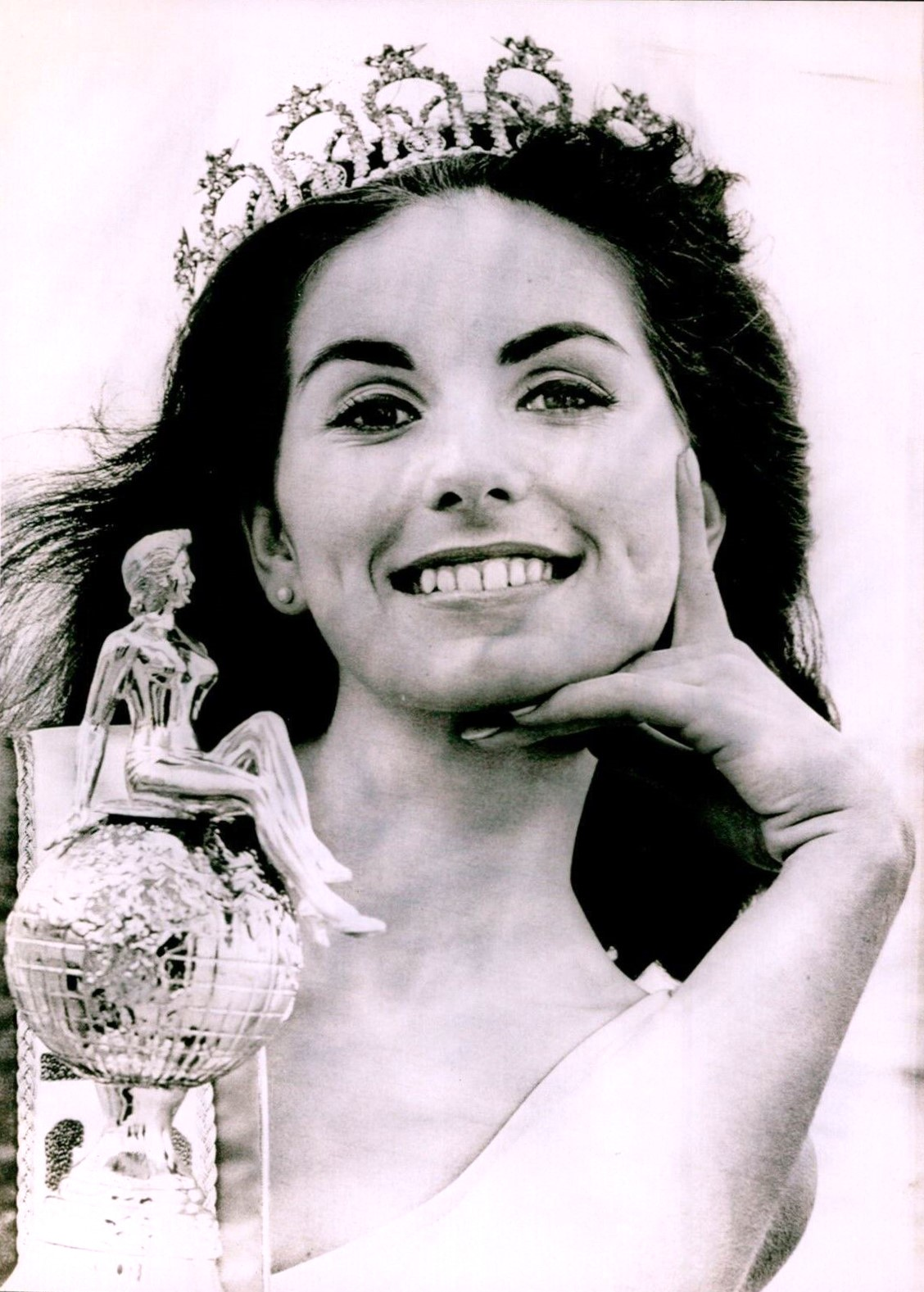
- Remenyi as Miss USA 1966
- Born: Maria Judith Remenyi; December 13, 1945 (age 80); Copenhagen, Denmark
- Height: 5 ft 6 in (1.68 m)
- Beauty pageant titleholder
- Title: Miss California USA 1966; Miss USA 1966
- Hair color: Brown
- Eye color: Brown
- Major competitions: Miss California USA 1966 (Winner); Miss USA 1966 (Winner); Miss Universe 1966 (Top 15)

Maria Judith Remenyi (born December 13, 1945, in Denmark) is a Hungarian-American astrophysicist, cosmologist and beauty pageant titleholder who held the title of Miss USA 1966.

== Early life ==
Remenyi was born in Copenhagen, Denmark of Hungarian parents. She migrated to the United States in 1956 when her family escaped from the Hungarian revolt.

== Miss USA ==
Remenyi, residing in El Cerrito, California, at the time, represented California at the Miss USA 1966 pageant held in Miami in May 1966. She was voted Miss Pixable by the press. On 22 May 1966 she became the second Californian to win the Miss USA title. In July she competed in the Miss Universe 1966 pageant, placing in the top fifteen.

In 1973 Remenyi was invited to judge the Miss USA 1973 pageant.

== Life after Miss USA ==
Prior to winning the Miss USA title she was a junior studying astrophysics at the University of California at Berkeley and was involved in bevatron research and computer programming at the Lawrence Radiation Laboratory. She dropped out after winning Miss USA and transferred to Columbia University, stating that she had fallen in love with New York during her reign.

In 1971, she hosted "Maria's Morning Show", a radio program on Vermont's WJOY, while studying computer science at the University of Vermont.
