= Kimberly Tomes =

American model

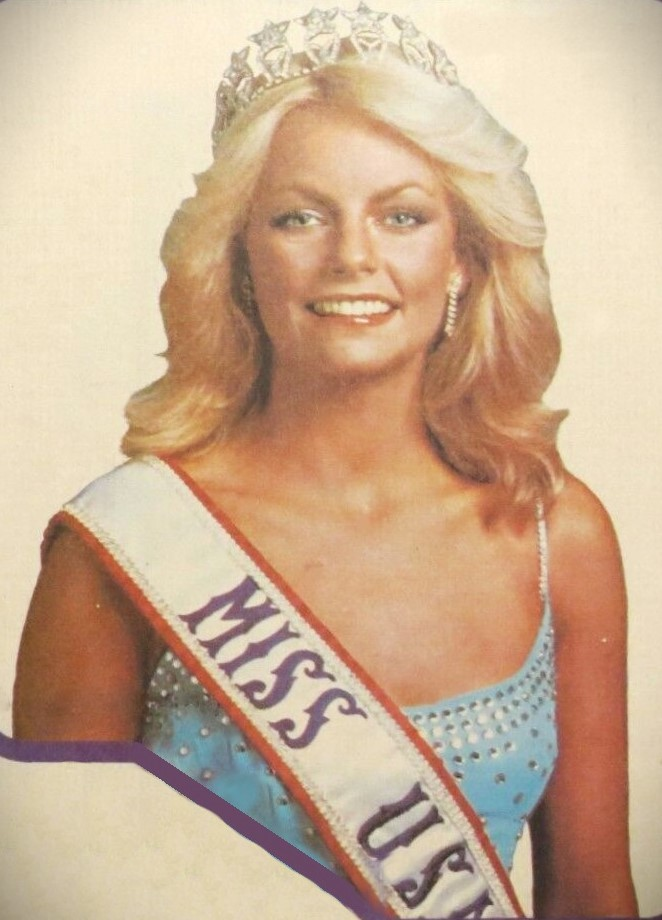
- Tomes as Miss USA 1977 before Miss Universe pageant
- Born: Kimberly Louise Tomes; August 20, 1955 (age 71); Chicago, Illinois, U.S.
- Height: 5 ft 8 in (1.73 m)
- Beauty pageant titleholder
- Title: Miss Texas World 1974; Miss Texas USA 1977; Miss USA 1977
- Hair color: Blonde
- Eye color: Blue
- Major competitions: Miss Texas World 1974 (Winner); Miss World USA 1974 (1st Runner-up); Miss Texas USA 1977 (Winner); Miss USA 1977 (Winner); Miss Universe 1977 (Top 12)

Kimberly Louise Tomes (born August 20, 1955) is an American model and beauty pageant titleholder who was crowned Miss USA 1977.

Tomes won the Miss Texas USA title in 1976 and later represented Texas in the Miss USA 1977 pageant held in Charleston, South Carolina. In the nationally televised pageant, Tomes won the Miss USA title, becoming the first woman from Texas to do so. Her placement followed many high placements for Texas in previous years and a consistent level of achievement throughout the pageant's history. In July Tomes represented the United States at the Miss Universe 1977 pageant held in Santo Domingo, Dominican Republic and made the semi-finals. Her national costume was a Native American chief.

As Miss USA Tomes made appearances in the United States and also traveled to the Philippines and Mexico.

Tomes holds a degree in physical education from Texas A&M University, one of two Miss USA winners to graduate from that university. The second is Kandace Krueger, Miss Texas USA and Miss USA 2001. She later worked in the entertainment industry, and retained ties to the Miss Texas USA pageant, hosting the event for twelve years.
