= Ramón H. Dovalina =

American educator (born 1943)

Ramón Humberto Dovalina
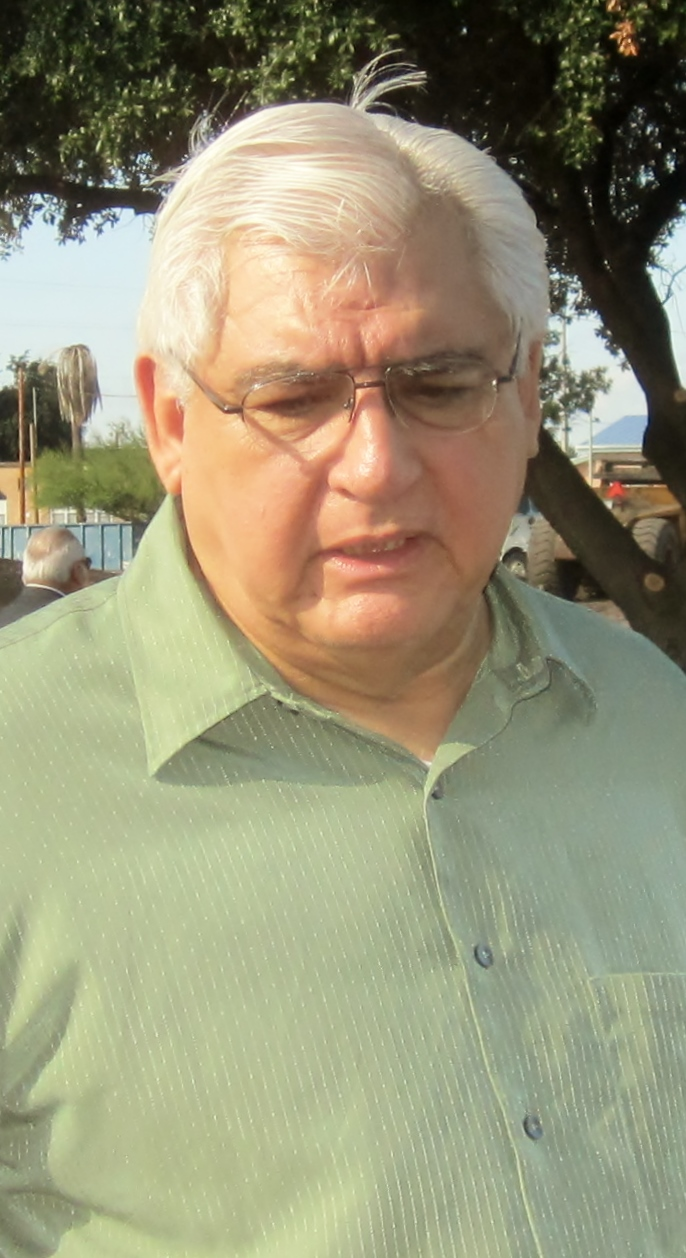
- Dovalina picture as he visits the LCC campus in 2010 for the groundbreaking ceremony of the Rodney Lewis Education and Academic Center.
- Born: July 13, 1943 (age 83); Laredo, Texas, US
- Education: Texas A&M University - Kingsville; University of Texas at Austin
- Occupation: President of Laredo Community College (1995–2007)
- Political party: Democrat
- Spouse: Mary Louise Campos Dovalina (divorced)
- Children: 2
- Relatives: Vidal M. Treviño (cousin); Don Tomás Sánchez

Ramón Humberto Dovalina (born July 13, 1943) is the retired fifth president of Laredo Community College, a two-year institution with the main campus on the grounds of historic Fort McIntosh on the Rio Grande in his native Laredo in Webb County in South Texas. With service from July 5, 1995, until August 31, 2007, Dovalina left the position with two years remaining in his contract. Under Dovalina, the physical appearance of the college was upgraded, the scholarship endowment fund increased from $100,000 in 1995 to more than $1 million in 2007, the institution advanced a 10-year master plan for new technology, and a $50 million South Campus was opened.

On September 28, 2007, Dovalina and his predecessor, Roger L. Worsley, were each named president emeritus during the sixtieth anniversary celebration of the founding of LCC, originally Laredo Junior College.

== Uncle ==
One of Dovalina's uncles, Alfredo G. Dovalina (1915–2017), was awarded three Bronze Star Medals and other citations with the United States Army in World War II and played professional baseball for teams in both Texas and Mexico, including Lockhart, Fort Worth, Tampico, and Monterrey. He was an inductee of the Laredo Latin American Hall Fame and the Rio Grande Valley Baseball Hall of Fame. For thirty-two years, Alfredo Dovalina was the Laredo fire marshal. Upon his death at the age of 101, he was the oldest living firefighter in Laredo.

Preceded by Roger L. Worsley	President of Laredo Community College in Laredo, Texas; 1995–2007	Succeeded by Juan L. Maldonado
