= Doc Sanchez Field =

Baseball venue in Laredo, Texas

Coordinates: 27.51112°N 99.5215°W

Doc Sanchez Field is a baseball venue located in Laredo, Texas and the home of the Laredo Community College Palominos baseball team. The field was named after Crispin "Doc" Sanchez.
