= CA-17 =

CA-17 may refer to:

- California's 17th congressional district
- California State Route 17
- CA-17 Mustang 20, a World War II fighter aircraft
