= Juan L. Maldonado =

American academic (1948–2018)

Juan Leandro Maldonado
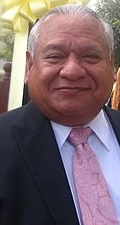
- Maldonado at the Veterans Day celebration at Laredo Community College in 2008

President of Laredo Community College
- In office September 1, 2007 – August 1, 2016
- Preceded by: Ramón H. Dovalina
- Succeeded by: Ricardo Solis

Personal details
- Born: November 28, 1948 Nueva Ciudad Guerrero, Mexico
- Died: December 16, 2018 (aged 70) San Antonio, Texas, US
- Spouses: Gloria Eloisa Torres Maldonado, later Gloria Longoria (1971-1984, div.); Peggy Jo Connally Maldonado (m. 1986-2001, div.); Linda Elevi Garcia Giddens Maldonado (surviving widow)
- Education: Texas A&M University; University of North Texas; Texas Woman's University

Juan Leandro Maldonado (November 28, 1948 – December 16, 2018) was a higher education administrator who served as the sixth president of Laredo Community College (since named Laredo College) in Laredo in Webb County in South Texas, US. In August 2007, upon the sudden retirement of Ramón H. Dovalina, Maldonado assumed the LCC presidency. Maldonado retired from LCC effective August 1, 2016.

== LCC trustee elections ==
In the fall of 2014, Maldonado became actively involved in LCC trustee elections when he stood on street corners and wrote two letters to the Laredo Morning Times to express support for two candidates, Jackie L. Ramos and Ed Gonzalez, who ran, respectively, against trustees Jesse Porras, a former LCC employee, and Hilario Cavazos Jr., a former educator with the Laredo Independent School District. Maldonado also endorsed Carlos Carranco Jr., for a seventh term as trustee, but Carranco was unseated by Tita Cantu Vela, a former LCC employee. Porras and Cavazos subsequently lost their reelection bids to Jackie Ramos and Michelle de la Peña, respectively. The defeats of Porras and Cavazos were considered major victories for Maldonado.

In October 2014, Maldonado took nearly two weeks of leave time while the trustee campaign was underway, in his words, "to reinstate a sense of professional decorum and integrity to our beloved LCC and its governing board." He affirmed that his leave time was not directly related to the trustee election campaign. Because of his political involvement, a letter writer to the Laredo Morning Times called for Maldonado to step down immediately.

The Laredo Morning Times questioned Maldonado's politicking in trustee elections; its education reporter, Judith Rayo, suggested that he could have been "walking on thin ice" legally in support of the three favored candidates, noting that in 1992 the United States Court of Appeals for the Fifth Circuit in New Orleans upheld the firing of a school superintendent for similar "electioneering".

After the November elections, the board in 2014 elected three new officers, with Hilario Cavazos as the temporary board president to succeed Cynthia Mares, but Cavazos' defeat at the polls a few weeks later in the runoff contest removed him from the ranks of the trustees. During his short tenure as board president, Cavazos was served a temporary restraining order initiated by fellow trustee Mercurio Martinez, a former county judge for Webb County, to block the board from reviewing the employment contracts of two employees accused of engaging in sexual relations on campus. Hilario Cavazos accused President Maldonado of "covering up a scandal, and he didn't do anything about it. I owed it to the public to try to correct this." In April 2015, Maldonado banned Cavazos from being on the LCC campus for fourteen days because of what Maldonado termed the former trustee's disruptive behavior at a public meeting on January 22.

=== Nora Stewart case ===
In January 2015, Maldonado suspended with pay LCC chief financial officer Nora Stewart, another member of his management team who he claimed misused her staff to obtain an undisclosed college document that Maldonado considered to be "confidential". Her attorney, George Altgelt, subsequently elected to one of the eight seats on the Laredo City Council, said that Stewart had been "retaliated against for doing exactly what her job requires her to do." Stewart claims that Maldonado belittled her as "Miss Righteous" and then said in question form, "You are now the "auditor?", rather than the title of chief financial officer.

Without revealing details of the investigation conducted into the Stewart matter by a McAllen firm, Anderson and Walsh, the trustees on May 18, 2015, directed the administration and its attorney to prepare an "amicable agreement" for Stewart's separation from the college. Stewart joined LCC in 2002; she was previously the asset management officer.

However, the trustees reversed course and voted 5–3 to renew Stewart's contract for another year. Altgelt had threatened to sue the members individually had they not done so. Stewart had also clashed with preceding President Ramón Dovalina, whom she accused, along with the then the retiring chief financial officer Daniel J. "Dan" Flores Jr. (1938–2016), of "retaliation, verbal abuse, harassment, mental anguish, creation of a hostile work environment, and excessive stress and harm to her professional reputation." Dovalina announced his pending departure within a month of the raising of Stewart's allegations. Stewart continued in her position when Maldonado succeeded Dovalina.

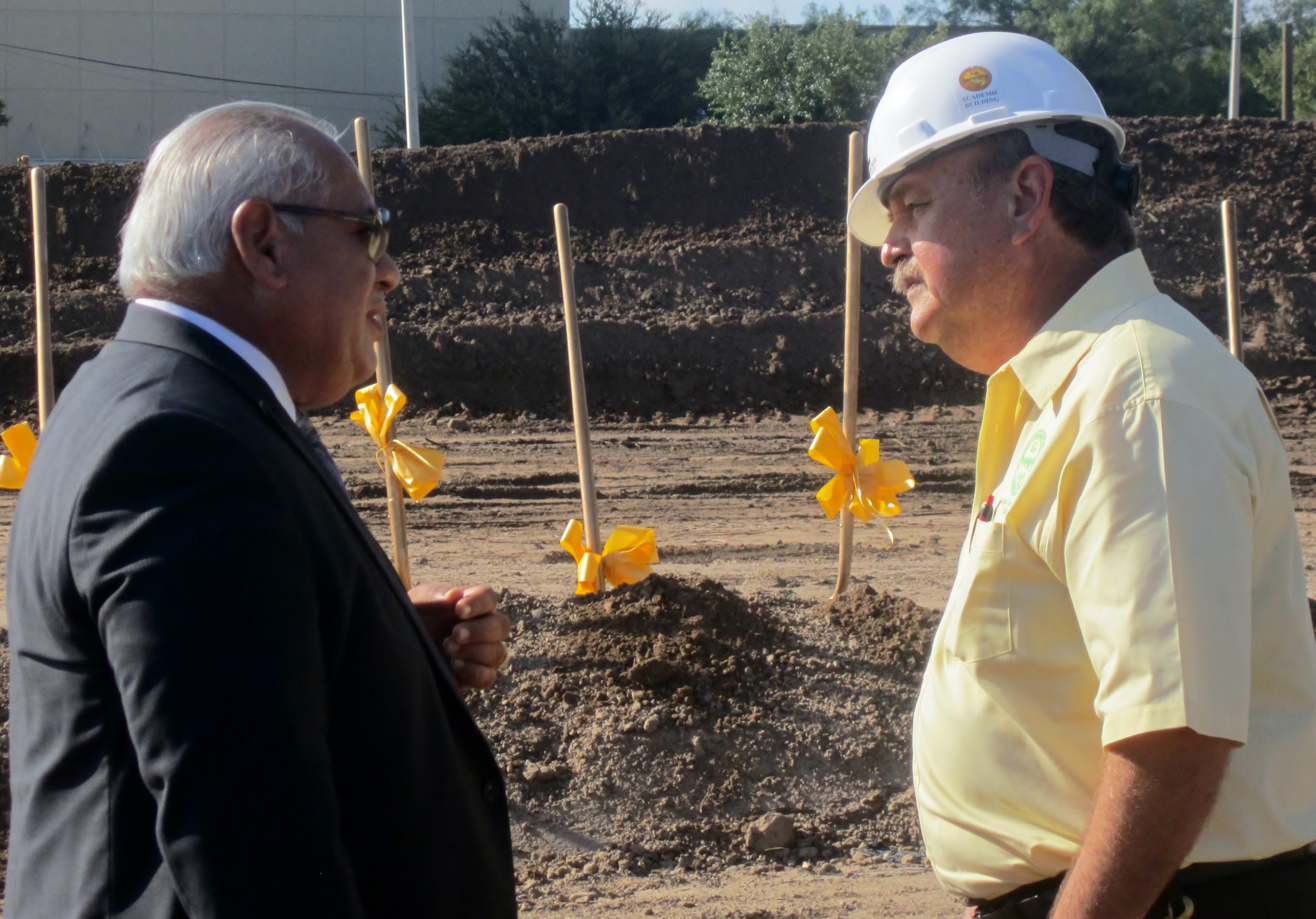
President Juan L. Maldonado (left) converses on September 15, 2010, with Jesse Poras, then the incoming LCC trustee, at the groundbreaking of the Rodney Lewis Education and Academic Center. Four years later, Maldonado campaigned successfully to defeat Porras in the trustee elections. Maldonado announced his own retirement several months thereafter.

=== Retirement issues ===
In June 2015, the LCC trustees took formal action not to extend the president's contract for another year. This action forced Maldonado to retire earlier than he had planned.

== Successor ==
In May 2016, the trustees voted 6–1, with two members absent, to name as Maldonado's successor Ricardo Solis, the former dean of academic, professional, and technical education at GateWay Community College in Phoenix, Arizona. A month later, the trustees bought out the last remaining month of Maldonado's contract and hired Solis as the replacement under a three-year contract at an annual salary of $180,000. Maldonado had started as president with $150,000 in annual compensation in 2007. Upon his departure from LCC, Maldonado received some $100,000 in unused sick leave and vacation days.

In 2017, Juan and Linda Maldonado were residing in San Antonio, Texas, where he died the following year. His obituary was published in the Spanish language edition of The Laredo Morning Times. U.S. Representative Henry Cuellar of Texas's 28th congressional district, who worked with Maldonado on various college projects, called him a "great leader and visionary" whose work greatly benefited the students.

Preceded by Ramón H. Dovalina	President of Laredo Community College in Laredo, Texas; 2007–2016	Succeeded by Ricardo Solis
