= Arkansas Law Enforcement Training Academy =

Flagship law enforcement training facility

Coordinates: 33.6307°N 92.7226°W

The Arkansas Law Enforcement Training Academy (ALETA) is the flagship law enforcement training facility in the U.S. state of Arkansas. Operated by the Arkansas Commission on Law Enforcement Standards and Training, ALETA provides training to all law enforcement agencies in Arkansas free-of-charge.

== History ==
ALETA was established in 1963 by the Arkansas General Assembly and eventually sited permanently on the grounds of the former Shumaker Naval Ammunition Depot near Camden, Arkansas. The Shumaker Naval Ammunition Depot was founded during World War II and was turned over to the State of Arkansas by President Lyndon B. Johnson to be turned into a police and fire academy as well as a college. Today, the grounds of the Shumaker Naval Ammunition Depot contain Southern Arkansas University Tech, the Arkansas Fire Training Academy, and Highland Industrial Park, as well as ALETA.

For decades, ALETA was the only police academy in Arkansas, and classes were often over capacity. ALETA is still the primary police academy in Arkansas, although the 2004 creation of ALETA-Northwest in Springdale and the 2017 creation of ALETA-Central at the Robinson Maneuver Training Center have somewhat reduced the high demand for classes at the Camden location.

== Basic police training ==
ALETA serves as the basic police academy for most state and local law enforcement agencies in Arkansas, although some of the larger departments, such as the Little Rock Police Department and the Arkansas State Police are allowed to operate their own academies under ALETA standards.

The current basic program consists of a 13-week course comprising both hands-on and classroom instruction, designed to prepare students for day-to-day work as patrol officers. ALETA currently offers four 13-week classes a year a at the primary campus in Camden, and two at both ALETA-Northwest and ALETA-Central. Each 13-week class graduates, on average, 100 police officers.

The 13-week class is required for those who serve as law-enforcement officers in excess of 21 hours a week. A shorter, 2 1/2-week course, is offered for part-time and auxiliary police officers and is offered as an off-campus class.
