= CA-18 =

CA-18 may refer to:

- California's 18th congressional district
- California State Route 18
- CAC Mustang, an Australian fighter aircraft
