= Arkansas EMT Association =

American non-profit organization

The Arkansas EMT Association is a non-profit organization consisting of Emergency Medical personnel from the State of Arkansas.

== Purpose ==
Since the Association's creation by a group of Hot Springs Emergency Medical Technicians in August 1978, the AEMTA has had two main goals. The first goal is to represent and serve Emergency Medical Services (EMS) Professionals through advocacy. This is accomplished by organized lobbying of the Arkansas General Assembly and the Arkansas Department of Health. The second goal, to represent and serve EMS Professionals through educational programs, is accomplished by providing low- or no-cost continuing education to members and non-members throughout the year.

== Membership ==
Membership in the Arkansas EMT Association is limited to persons holding current certifications as either Emergency Medical Technician, Advanced Emergency Medical Technician, or Paramedic. Under the AEMTA bylaws, membership is also open to those certified by the Arkansas Fire Training Academy as Emergency Medical Responder, although the Arkansas Department of Health does not recognize this level of certification.
