= BRTC =

BRTC may refer to:

- Bangladesh Road Transport Corporation
- Black River Technical College
- Bahrain Radio and Television Corporation
