= Lewis Air Legends =

Aviation organisation in San Antonio, Texas, USA

- Established: 2009; 17 years ago
- Founder: Rod Lewis
- Type: Nonprofit
- Website: www.lewisairlegends.com

Lewis Air Legends is an organization located in San Antonio, Texas focused on historic aviation.

== History ==
Rod Lewis, the son of an air force pilot and founder of Lewis Energy, purchased his first aircraft, an Aeronca Chief, in 1981 to survey the oil and natural gas wells his company owned. He began collecting aircraft in 1995 when he purchased a T-28.

In 2006, he purchased both the F8F Rare Bear and the P-38 Glacier Girl. He founded Lewis Air Legends in 2009. By 2012, it operated a team at the Reno Air Races called Lewis Air Racing.

The organization purchased a VC-121A used by General Douglas MacArthur from the Planes of Fame Air Museum in 2015 and began restoring it to airworthy condition. The aircraft debuted at EAA AirVenture in 2023.

The organization sold a de Havilland Mosquito that was being restored for it in New Zealand in 2020.

The organization's A-20 was seriously damaged in a forced landing following an engine fire at the WBCA Stars & Stripes Air Show Spectacular on 16 February 2025.

== Organization ==
The aircraft are divided among several entities including the Air Legends Foundation, Lewis Fighter Fleet and Lewis Vintage Collection.

== Collection ==
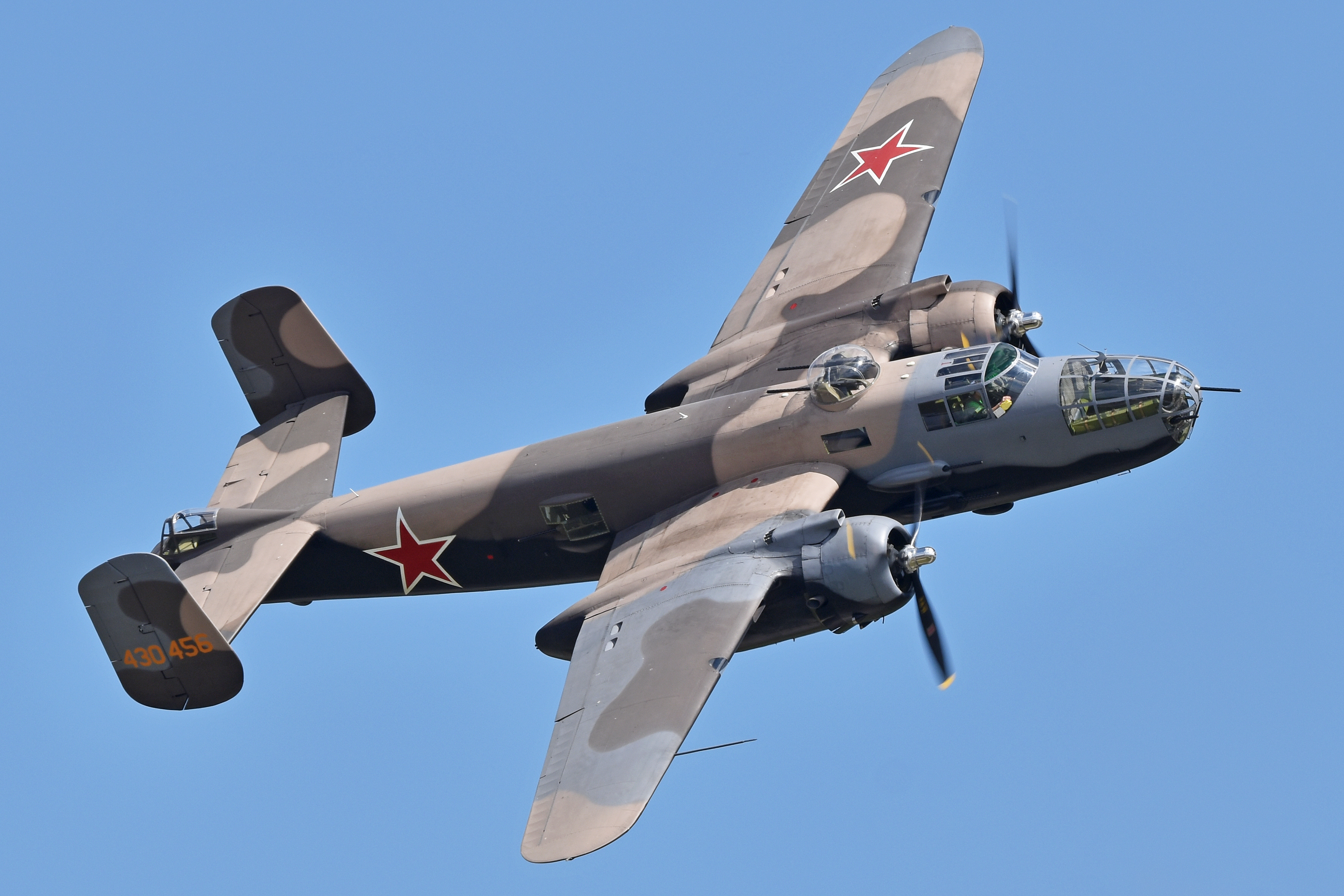
North American B-25J Mitchell

=== Air Legends Foundation ===
- Bell P-39Q Airacobra
- de Havilland DH.89A Dragon Rapide
- Douglas A-20 Havoc
- Goodyear FG-1D Corsair
- Grumman F3F-2
- Grumman F4F-3 Wildcat
- Grumman F6F Hellcat
- Grumman F8F-2 Bearcat
- Grumman G-73T Mallard
- Lockheed VC-121A Constellation
- Lockheed P-38F Lightning

=== Lewis Air Legends ===
- Aero L-39C Albatros
- Bell AH-1G Cobra
- CAC CA-18 Mustang Mk 22 – restored as TF-51D
- Canadair CF-5D
- Canadair Sabre Mk. 6
- Grumman F7F-3P Tigercat
- Grumman F7F-3P Tigercat
- Grumman F8F-2 Bearcat
- Grumman F8F-2 Bearcat
- North American B-25J Mitchell
- North American NA-50 – replica
- North American T-6 Texan
- Republic P-47 Thunderbolt
- Ryan PT-22 Recruit
- Supermarine Spitfire Mk. Vb

== See also ==
- Mid America Flight Museum
