= Arkansas Fire Training Academy =

Official fire training institution in U.S. state

The Arkansas Fire Training Academy is the official fire training institution for the state of Arkansas. The main campus is located on the grounds of Southern Arkansas University Tech in Camden, Arkansas, alongside the Arkansas Law Enforcement Training Academy.

== Mission ==
The mission of the Arkansas Fire Training Academy is to provide training and certification in fire fighting and related emergency service programs to the Arkansas Fire Service, in accordance with the standards of the National Fire Protection Association. The degree program results in an associates of science degree in Fire and Emergency Response.

== History ==
Fire training in Arkansas began in 1939 through the Arkansas Fire College in an office in the Old Main Building at the University of Arkansas, Fayetteville campus. The first official training publication of the Fire College, titled "Arkansas Fireman", was issued May 15, 1939. The Arkansas Fire College and its monthly training publication were transferred from the University of Arkansas to the Arkansas Fire Prevention Bureau in Little Rock on September 1, 1942. The Arkansas Fire Prevention Bureau was supported by the Arkansas Inspection and Rating Bureau, later to be known as the Insurance Service Office (ISO). From the time of inception in 1939 to the final publication in on December 1, 1969, the monthly publication was written by Carl S. Smalley, the first state fire instructor.

From the beginning in 1939, the fire training was through the Arkansas Fire College. Because there was no physical base from which to work, instructors traveled throughout Arkansas teaching firefighting techniques to individual fire department personnel and through regional fire schools attended by fire departments in central, eastern, and northwestern geographical areas. The regional fire schools became the method that statewide fire training was delivered, and the first regional school was held in Fort Smith on June 19-22, 1939. Approximately 80 firefighters from 8 cities and towns attended with instruction provided by Fort Smith Fire Department Assistant Chiefs John Dixon and Pink Dean and Captains Furner, Williamson, and Borger. Instruction for local fire department training officers was also developed to ensure the continued training of fire fighters, supplemented by the regional training programs.

The Fire Training Academy (as it was originally named) was formally established in 1967 as a training division of the Southwest Technical Institute (later to become Southern Arkansas University Technical Campus).

The administrative offices for the new fire academy were set up in what was once the main fire station of the weapons depot. This building served as the AFTA administrative offices, primary classroom and central training location until Phase I construction at the Camden training site was completed in 1973. The building continued to serve as the administration building until the completion of a new administrative building at the training site in June 2004.

In 1980, the Fire Academy helped coordinate the delivery of extensive training programs offered by the National Fire Prevention and Control Administration (later known as the US Fire Administration) to help curb the unusually high fire death and injury rates in the state. Under a massive agreement, signed by Governor Bill Clinton and US Fire Administrator Gordon Vickery, national fire training materials from the National Fire Academy and initiatives from the Fire Administration's Public Education Office were delivered to the Arkansas Fire Academy for dissemination to local fire departments.

The Lead Instructor of the Arkansas Fire Training Academy was Whit Murphy, for whom the facilities at the Camden Training Site are named.

The Camden Training Site includes the new administration building with theatre style classroom, faculty and staff offices and reception area and a large classroom building with offices, a large two-story burn building, a small single-story, a smoke building, a five-story drill tower, an apparatus building, pumpers, and various training props.

== 2009 Tornado ==
The Academy's main campus in East Camden, Arkansas, was struck by a tornado on October 29, 2009, at approximately 3:50 pm. There were approximately 43 students, and several faculty in the classroom and administration buildings when the storm hit the academy grounds. The tornado, rated EF2 on the Enhanced Fujita scale, destroyed multiple buildings, including the main engine bay and smokehouse, and severely damaged all other facilities, with the exception of the Nix building, the main burn building, and the training tower. Most vehicles were damaged, some being thrown around the grounds, and consequently totaled.

== Academy locations ==
The Academy's main campus is located at Southern Arkansas University Tech in Camden. The Academy also operates campuses at Conway, Jonesboro, Lincoln, and Marshall (the Marshall Campus is closed as of September 2005), as well as Associate Training Centers at Black River Technical College in Pocahontas and at Cossatot Community College in DeQueen.

== Firefighter training ==
The Arkansas Fire Training Academy is accredited by the International Fire Service Accreditation Congress (IFSAC) and the National Board on Fire Service Professional Qualifications (NPQS or Pro-Board) to certify personnel to the Firefighter I, Firefighter II, Driver/Operator, Hazardous Materials-Awareness, Hazardous Materials-Operations, Instructor I and Fire Officer I & II levels.

As of 2018, The Arkansas Fire Training Academy offers its services to all Fire Departments in Arkansas, free of charge, regardless if public or private, paid or volunteer. The Academy conducts six "Firefighter Standards" classes a year. Upon completion of each "Standards" class, firefighters are certified in both IFSAC and ProBoard as Firefighter I and II.

The Academy offers a wide range of classes both on and off campus through a network of adjunct instructors.

== EMS training ==
The Arkansas Fire Training Academy offers medical training at the BLS-level. The Academy offers certification for both Emergency Medical Responder and Emergency Medical Technician.

The Arkansas Department of Health does not recognize any medical provider below the level of Emergency Medical Technician, instead allowing cities and counties to regulate medical first responders. The Arkansas Fire Academy offers six classes each year of "EMS First Responder," which follows the 2011 NREMT model for Emergency Medical Responder. Because the State does not regulate this level of medical responders, the Fire Academy course has become a widely accepted standard in many areas of the state. The Arkansas EMT Association recognizes first responders certified in compliance with the Arkansas Fire Training Academy as medical providers, and has opened membership to those trained under the Arkansas Fire Academy program.
