= Southern Arkansas University Tech =

Technical Institute in Calhoun County, Arkansas, U.S.

Coordinates: 33°37′46″N 92°43′12″W

Southern Arkansas University Tech (SAU Tech) is a technical institute in Calhoun County, Arkansas, United States.

== History ==
SAU Tech was created on April 5, 1967, as Southwest Technical Institute by Act 534 of the Arkansas Legislature. The purpose of the institute was to provide a technically trained workforce for the growing Highland Industrial Park where it was located. Seventy acres of land and six buildings at the Park were donated by the Brown Foundation of Houston, Texas which had purchased the former Shumaker Naval Ammunition Depot for redevelopment. Financing for renovation and equipping the facility was made possible by a grant from the U.S. Economic Development Administration.

The Arkansas State Board of Education operated the school until 1975 when, by an Act of the Arkansas Legislature, Southwest Technical Institute became Southern Arkansas University Tech under the governance of the Board of Trustees of Southern Arkansas University. With this change, the college came under the jurisdiction of the Arkansas Department of Higher Education to grant the associate of arts and associate of science degrees as well as the associate of applied science degree.

Today, SAU Tech is a two-year college specializing in technical training and offers the first two years of a university transfer program in General Education, Teacher Education, and Business Administration. Technical programs are offered in Aviation Maintenance, Computer Information Technology, Technology, with the option of an emphasis in Industrial Maintenance and Engineering, Office Systems Technology, with the option of an emphasis in Medical Transcription, and Multimedia Technology, which includes either an emphasis in Film & Video Production, Graphic Design, or Game Design and Development.

Roger L. Worsley, former president of Laredo Community College in Laredo, Texas, became chancellor of SAU Tech in 1996.

The specialty schools are the SAU Tech Career Academy, the Ouachita County Adult Education Center, the Arkansas Fire Training Academy, and the Arkansas Environmental Training Academy. The Columbia and Dallas County adult education centers have joined the SAU Tech list of programs and facilities.

== Governance ==
SAU Tech is governed by the Board of Trustees of Southern Arkansas University in nearby Magnolia. The SAU Tech Chancellor reports directly to the SAU President in Magnolia.

== Accreditation ==
SAU Tech is accredited by the Higher Learning Commission of the North Central Association of Colleges and Schools. SAU Tech's overall accreditation, and those of its individual programs, are independent of SAU's accreditations.

The following programs have received additional accreditation or approval as shown below:

Academic Program	Accrediting/Approving Agency
Aviation Maintenance Technology	Federal Aviation Administration
Practical Nursing	Arkansas State Board of Nursing
Nursing Assistant	Arkansas Department of Human Services, Office of Long Term Care
Firefighter Standards	International Fire Service Accreditation Congress
Firefighter Standards	National Board of Fire Service Professional Qualifications
