= Roger L. Worsley =

College administrator (b. 1937)

Roger Lewis Worsley
- Born: March 22, 1937 (age 89); Hunter, Cass County, North Dakota, US
- Education: Midland (Michigan) High School; Arizona State University
- Occupations: Educator; Higher education administrator; President, Laredo Community College (1985-1995); Chancellor, Southern Arkansas University Tech (1996-2005)
- Political party: Democrat
- Spouses: (1) Glenda Jane Taylor Worsley (married 1958-1973, divorced); (2) Linda Ann Howie Worsley (divorced); (3) Carolyn Griffith Gilley Worsley
- Children: Roger Jackson Worsley
- Parent(s): Craig E. and Louise M. Skue Worsley

Roger Lewis Worsley (born March 22, 1937) is a retired college administrator, who was the president of Laredo Community College in Laredo, Texas from 1985 to 1995. He served as the chancellor of Southern Arkansas University Tech in Camden, Arkansas from 1996 to 2005.
