= Fort McIntosh, Texas =

- Fort McIntosh
- U.S. National Register of Historic Places
- U.S. Historic district
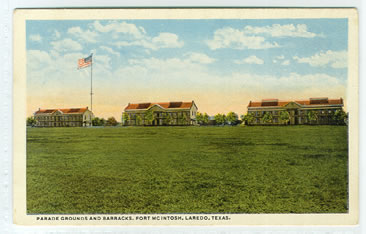
- Fort McIntosh

- Location within Texas Location within the United States
- Location: Laredo Junior College campus, Laredo, Texas
- Coordinates: 27°30′19″N 99°31′14″W
- Area: 193.8 acres (78.4 ha)
- Built: 1853
- Architectural style: Late Victorian
- NRHP reference No.: 75002011
- Added to NRHP: June 25, 1975

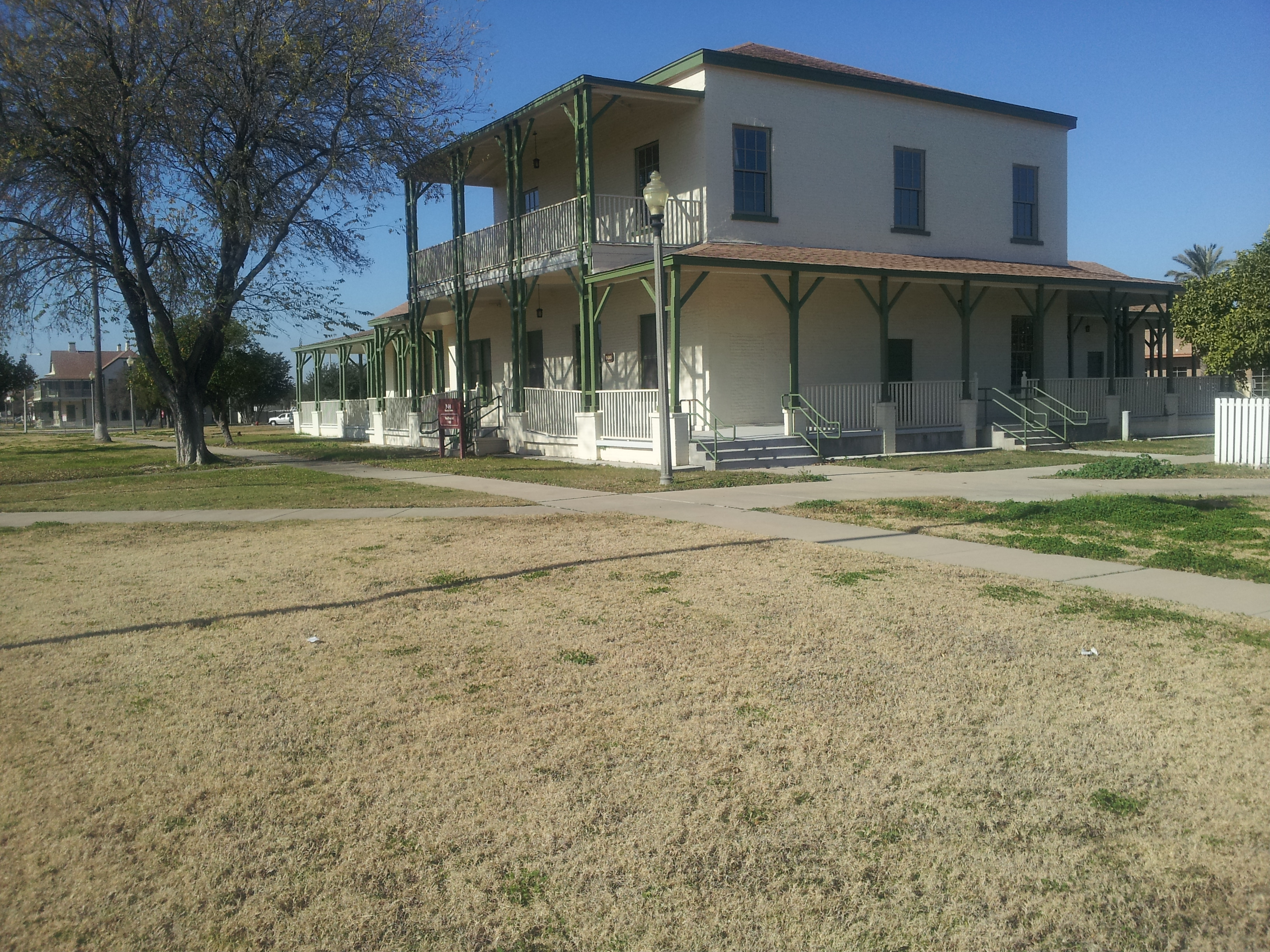
Fort McIntosh

Fort McIntosh was a U.S. Army base in Laredo, Webb County, Texas, from 1849 to 1946.

Fort McIntosh was established on 3 March 1849 by the 1st US Infantry, under the command of Lt. E.L. Viele, to guard the Texas frontier at the site of a strategic river crossing. Originally named Camp Crawford, the fort was renamed Fort McIntosh in 1850 in honor of Lieutenant Colonel James Simmons McIntosh, a hero in the Battle of Molino del Rey during the Mexican–American War.

The fort was abandoned by Federal troops at the outbreak of the American Civil War. The Battle of Laredo took place near the fort on March 19, 1864, when 72 men repelled three attacks from a force of 200 federal soldiers sent from Brownsville, Texas. On October 23, 1865, the post was reoccupied by federal troops of the 2nd Texas Cavalry.

In the late 19th century, several African-American units among them the 10th Cavalry, the "Buffalo Soldiers", were stationed at Fort McIntosh. Other forts in the frontier fort system were Forts Griffin, Concho, Belknap, Chadbourne, Stockton, Davis, Bliss, McKavett, Clark, Richardson, Inge, and Phantom Hill in Texas, and Fort Sill in Oklahoma. Thesystem had "subposts or intermediate stations" including Bothwick's Station on Salt Creek between Fort Richardson and Fort Belknap, Camp Wichita near Buffalo Springs between Fort Richardson and Red River Station, and Mountain Pass between Fort Concho and Fort Griffin.

During World War I, the fort was used as a training base, and had over 15,000 recruits pass through the gates. During World War II, the 8th Service Command, the 56th Cavalry Brigade, the Southern Land Frontier, the Civil Air Patrol, and battalion of military police all were stationed at the facility at one time or another.

The fort was deactivated in 1946, and the land is now part of the campus of Laredo Community College main campus.

The Colburn Memorial United States Army Reserve Center is located within the fort.

== National Register of Historic Places ==
The National Register of Historic Places added Fort McIntosh (#75002011) to its registered historic districts in 1975. Its areas of historic significance are its 1850-1924 Late Victorian Architecture and Military background. All of Fort McIntosh buildings have been preserved and remodeled, and today they serve as educational buildings for Laredo Community College. The former officers barracks has been renovated into Arechiga Hall, named for the third LCC president, Domingo Arechiga.

== Gallery ==
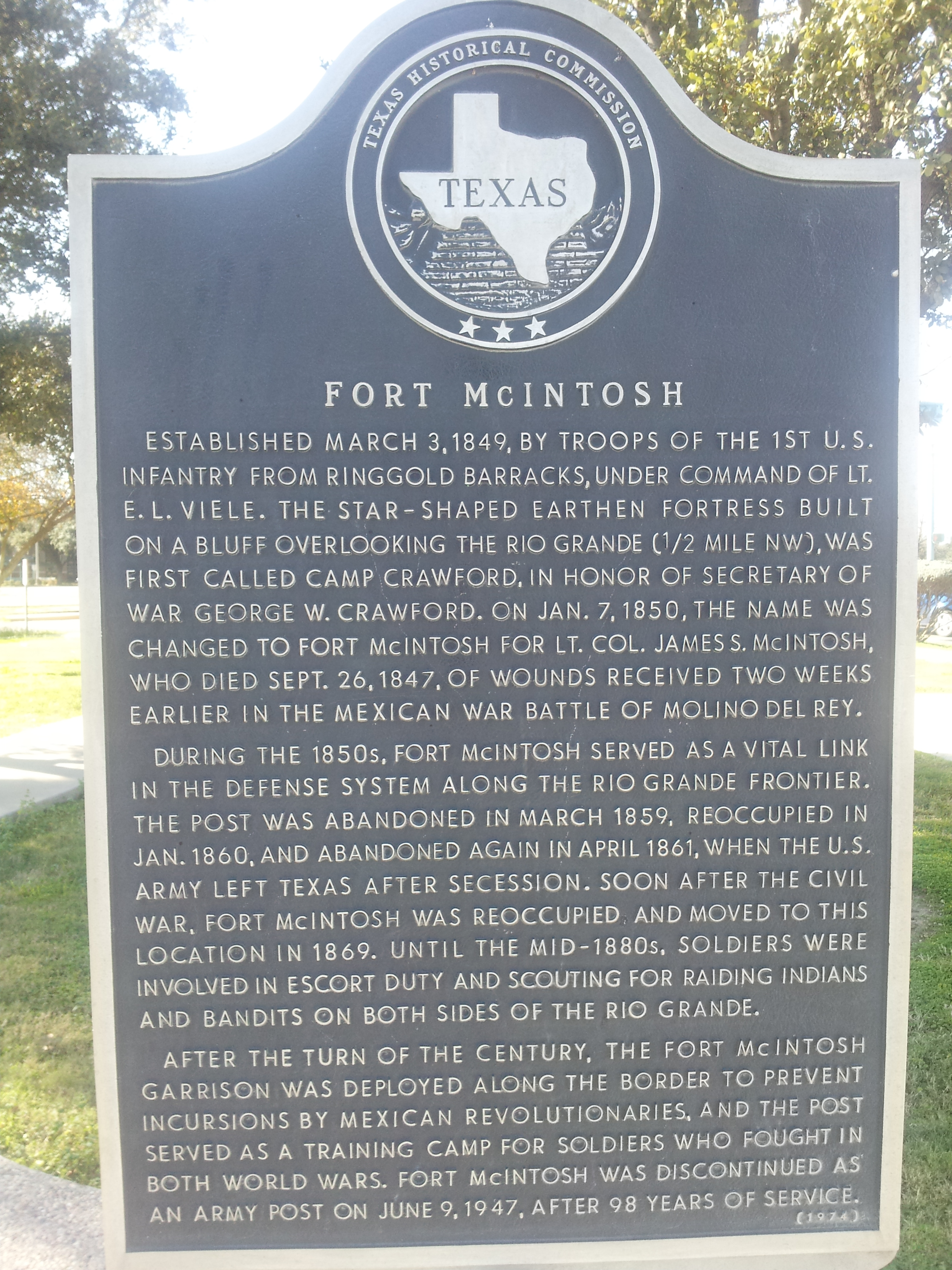
Texas Historical Marker

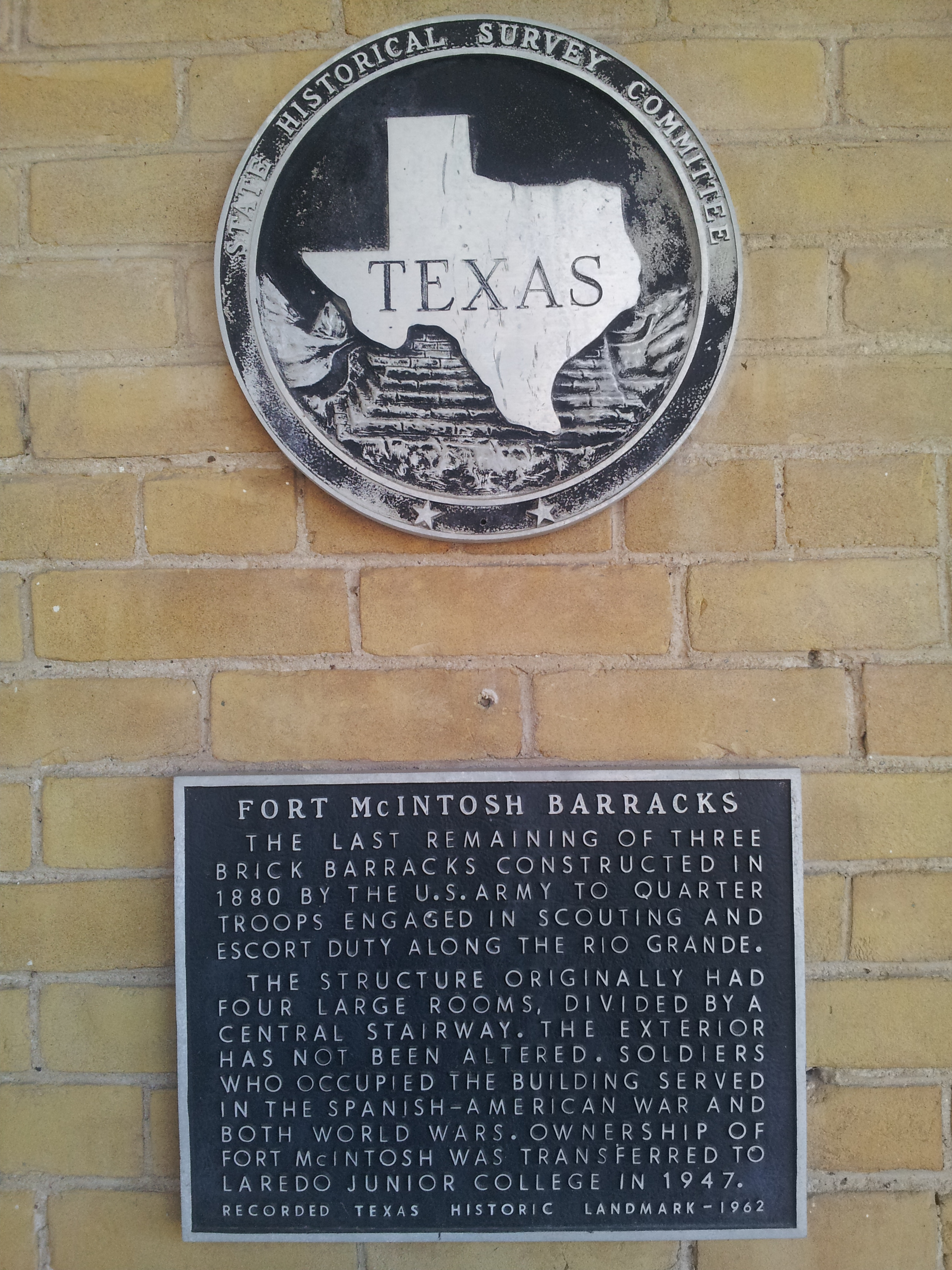
Texas Historical Marker for barracks

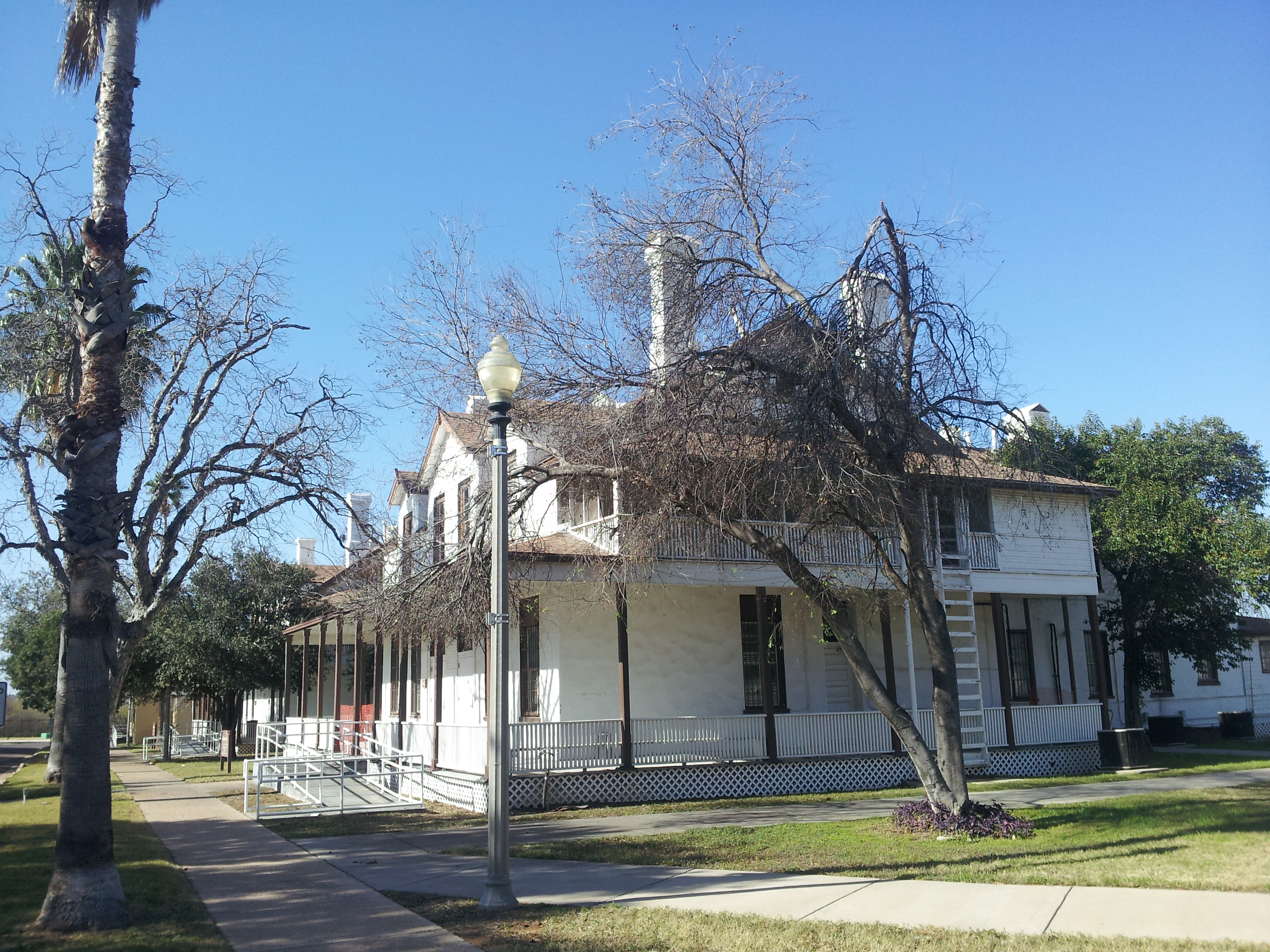
Officers Row

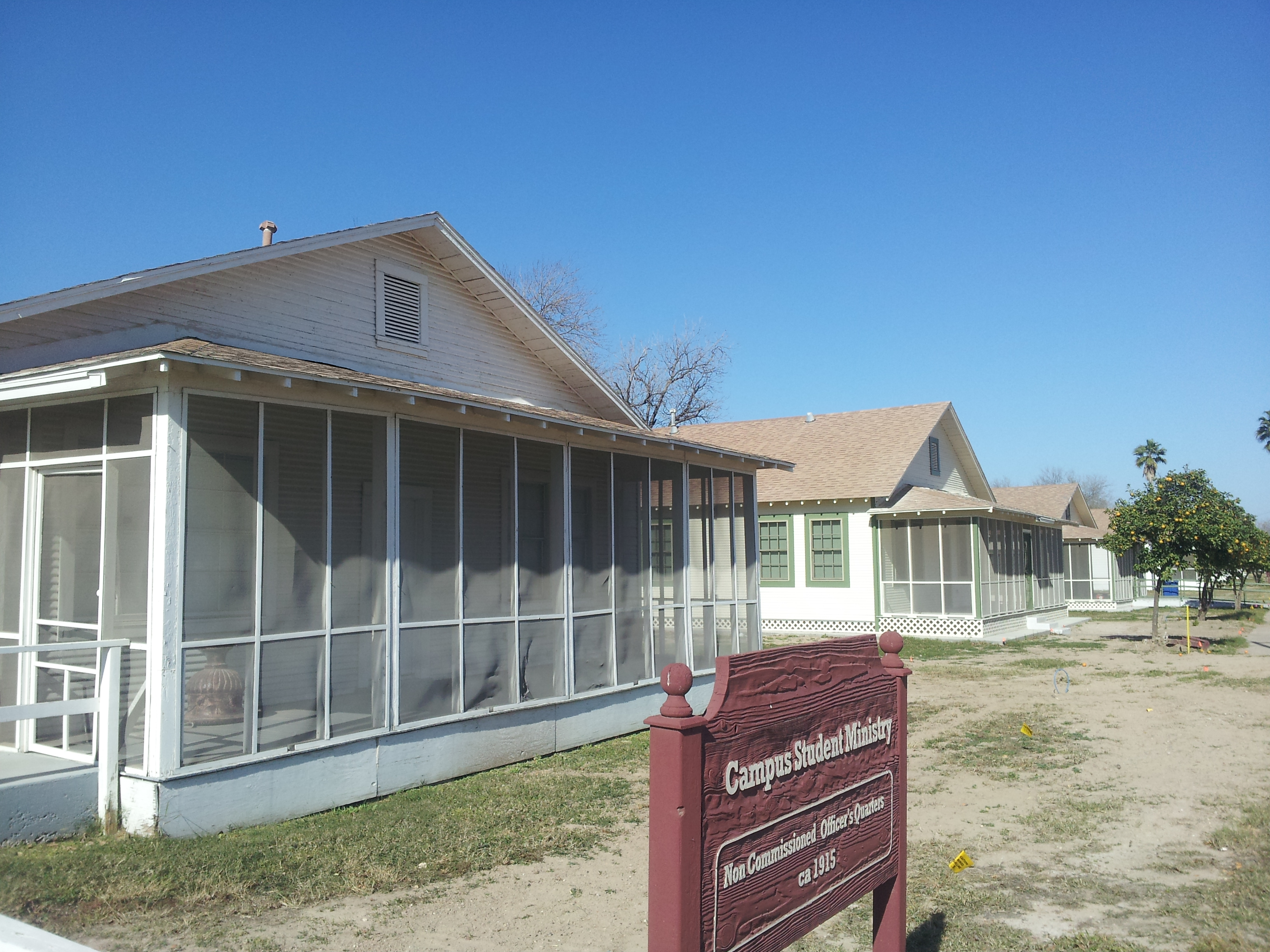
NCO row

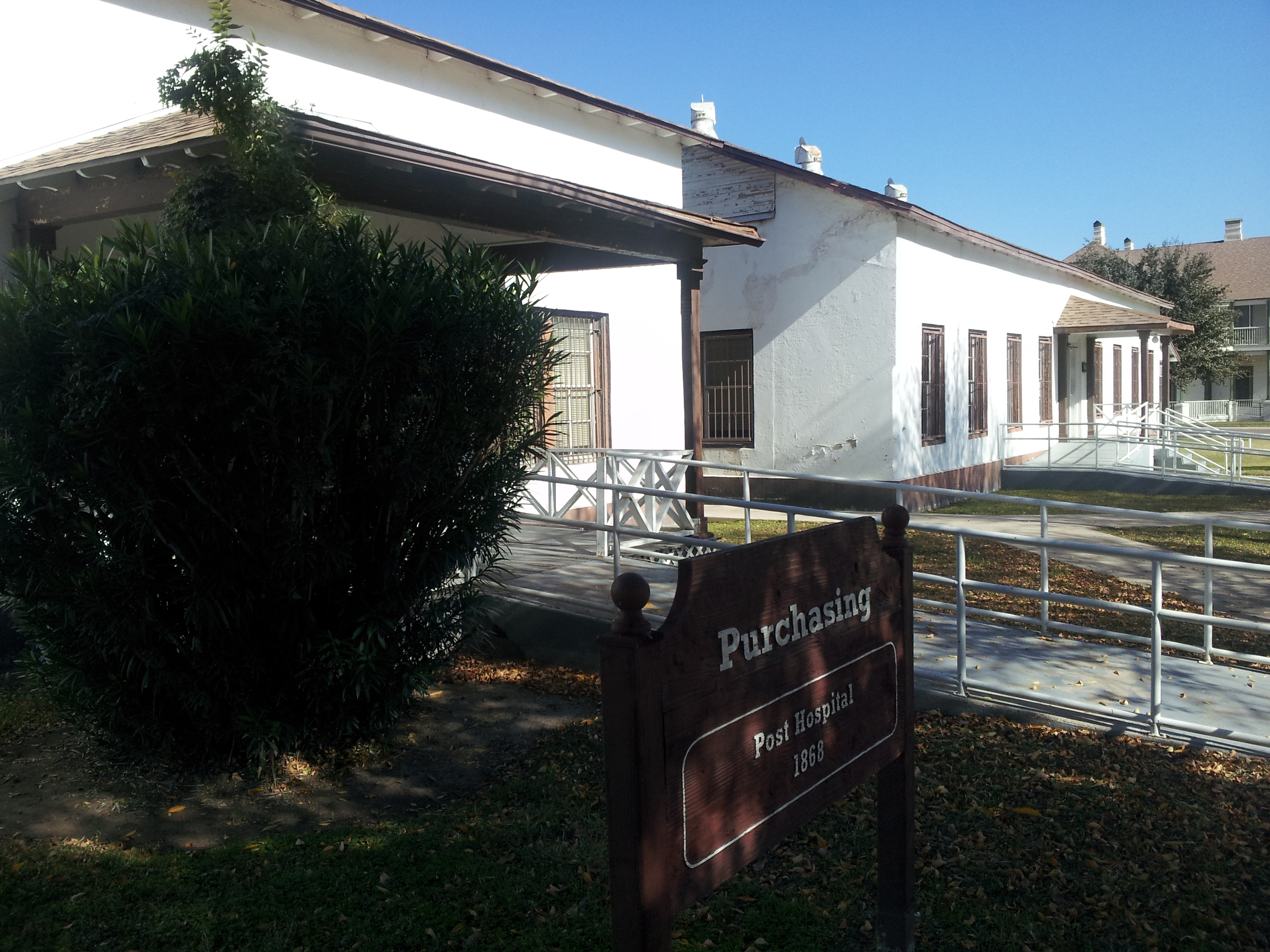
Hospital

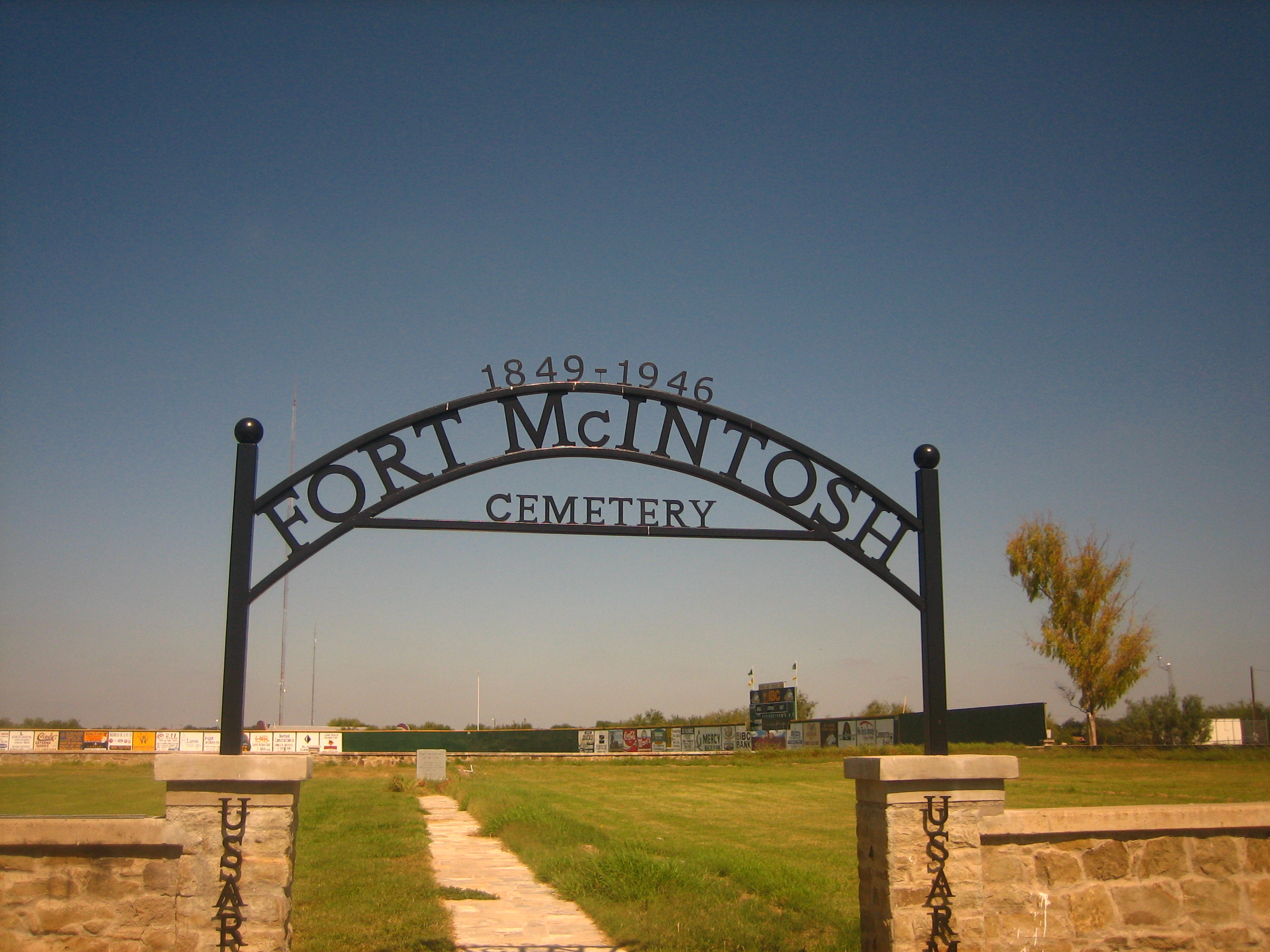
Gate to Fort McIntosh Cemetery in Laredo, Texas

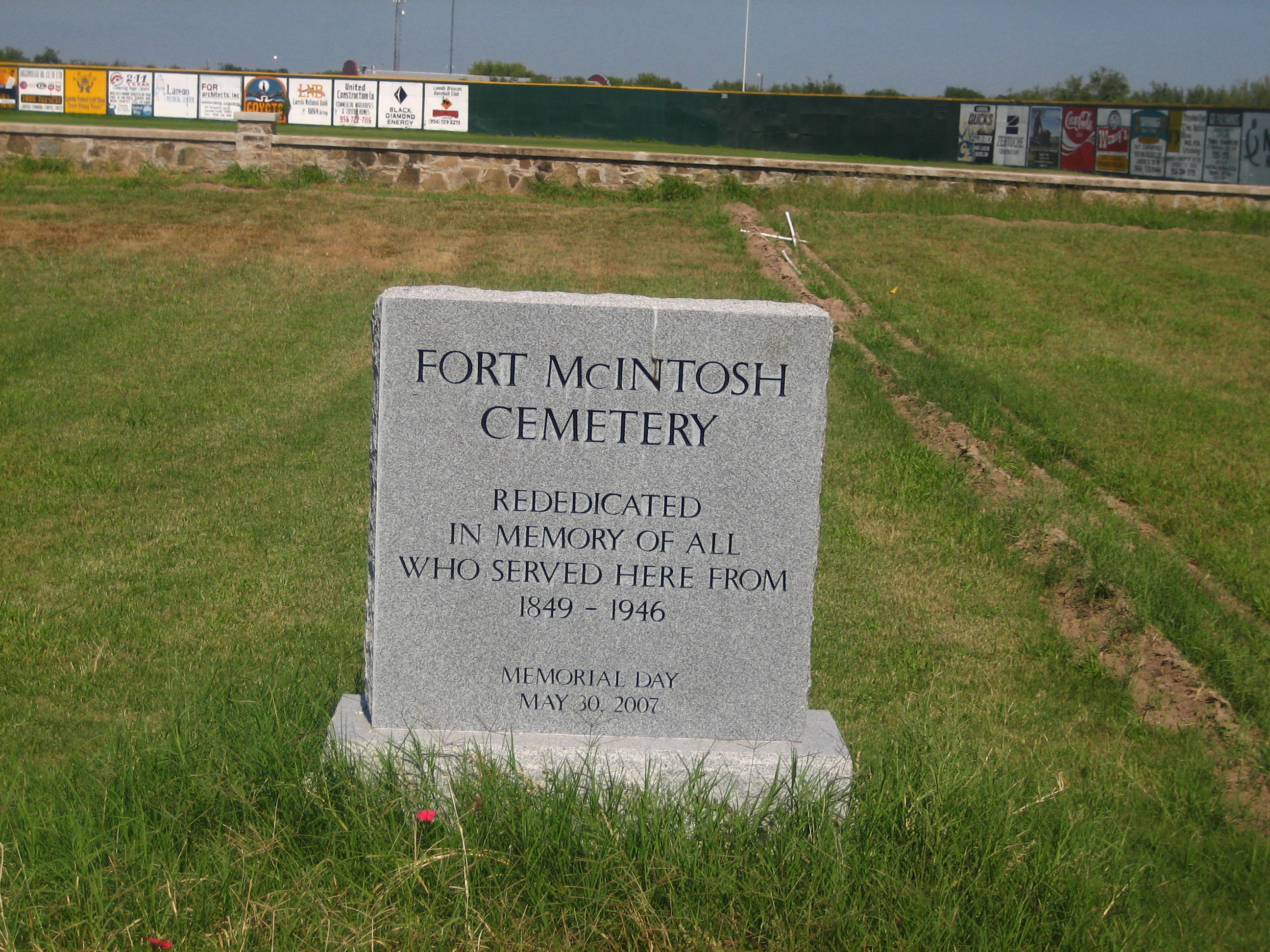
This monument honors all the fallen at Fort McIntosh Cemetery; no individual graves remain.

== Aerial view ==
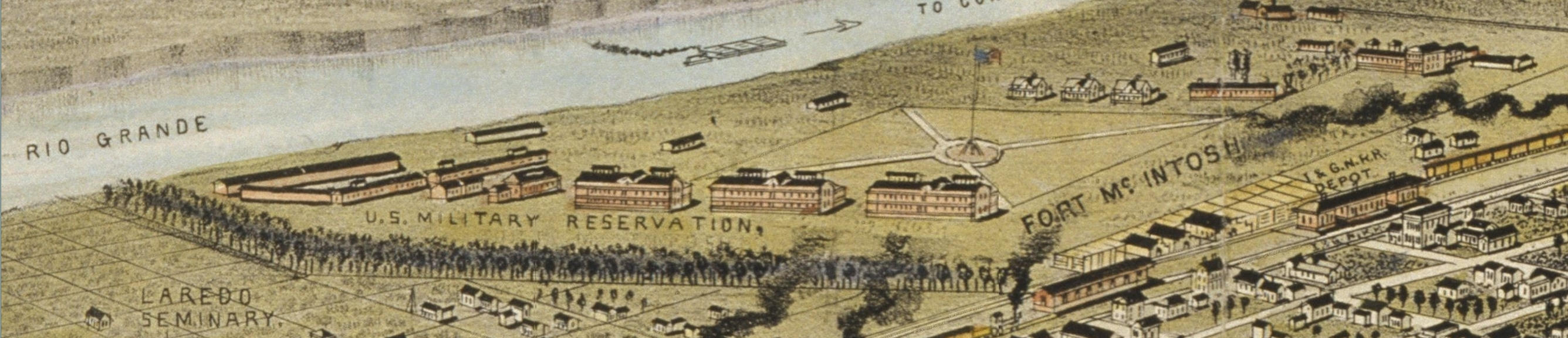
The full length of the Fort McIntosh U.S. Military Reservation in 1892.

== See also ==
- Laredo, Texas
- Laredo Community College
- Downtown Laredo
- National Register of Historic Places listings in Webb County, Texas
- Forts of Texas
