= Rodney Lewis (businessman) =

American businessman

Rodney Ray Lewis
- Born: 1954 (age 71–72); Laredo, Texas, USA
- Education: Texas A&M International University
- Occupations: Oil and natural gas industrialist Rancher
- Spouse: Kimberly Annette Spicer Lewis (married c. 1978)
- Children: Four children

Rodney Ray Lewis, known as Rod Lewis (born 1954), is founder, president, and Chief Executive Officer of Lewis Energy, an oil and natural gas drilling company based in Texas, US.

== Biography ==
Lewis was born and raised on a ranch in Laredo in Webb County in South Texas. His father was a pilot in the United States Air Force. He graduated from what is now Texas A&M International University in Laredo with a Bachelor of Arts in criminal justice.

He started his career in the oil industry by working for Stampede Energy and for the R.L. Burns Corporation. He purchased his first oil well for $13,000 in 1982 and launched Lewis Energy the next year. In 1995, he borrowed $5 million from Enron Capital & Trade and repaid the loan in eight months. Alongside drilling in South Texas, he has drilled in Mexico for Pemex, and in Colombia for Hupecol Caracara and Solana Resources. In 2003, he sold much of his Texas pipelines to Dan Duncan, the CEO of Enterprise Products Partners. He is the first American wildcatter to drill in Mexico since former President Lázaro Cárdenas made it illegal for anyone but the Mexican government to do so. Forbes magazine called Lewis "the only gringo allowed to drill in Mexico." He can collect as much as $350 million annually from Pemex for drilling on 80,000 acres near the border. He does not own the oil or natural gas but is compensated for drilling the land. Lewis owns at least 350,000 acres of the Eagle Ford Shale property. In 2010, BP began drilling on 80,000 acres of Eagle Ford Shale property that Lewis owns.

As of March 2018, he is the 1,756th richest person in the world. He is worth US$1.3 billion. He collects World War II-era planes, and he owns 30, including Glacier Girl, which he bought for $10 million. He founded Lewis Air Legends in 2009. Since 2012 or 2013 he is the owner of M5, the largest single-masted yacht ever built.

Lewis and his wife, the former Kimberly Annette Spicer (born c. 1958), have four adult children. He also owns a ranch in Encinal north of Laredo. Lewis is a survivor of esophageal cancer but lost his salivary glands in treatment.

In March 2013, Mrs. Lewis filed for divorce in the Bexar County Courthouse. There is no mention of a pre-nuptial agreement, and Texas is a community property state. At least thirteen lawsuits are involved in the Lewis' marital squabbles. Mrs. Lewis is asking that her husband pay her legal fees in the dispute. Rod Lewis stated in an interview that he loved his wife and that he had no intention of divorcing her. Lewis and she later reconciled and continue to attend public events together.

The Rod and Kim Lewis Foundation donates grants to charitable organizations. Lewis provided the furnishing of the three-story Lewis Energy Academic Center, which opened in January 2012 on the campus of Laredo Community College.

In August 2014, Lewis was named recipient of the annual Angel of Hope Award for his work in providing Christmas gifts to needy children in Webb County. Angel of Hope was originated by the constable's office of Webb County Precinct 1.
