= Packard V-1650 Merlin =

Piston aircraft engine

V-1650 Merlin
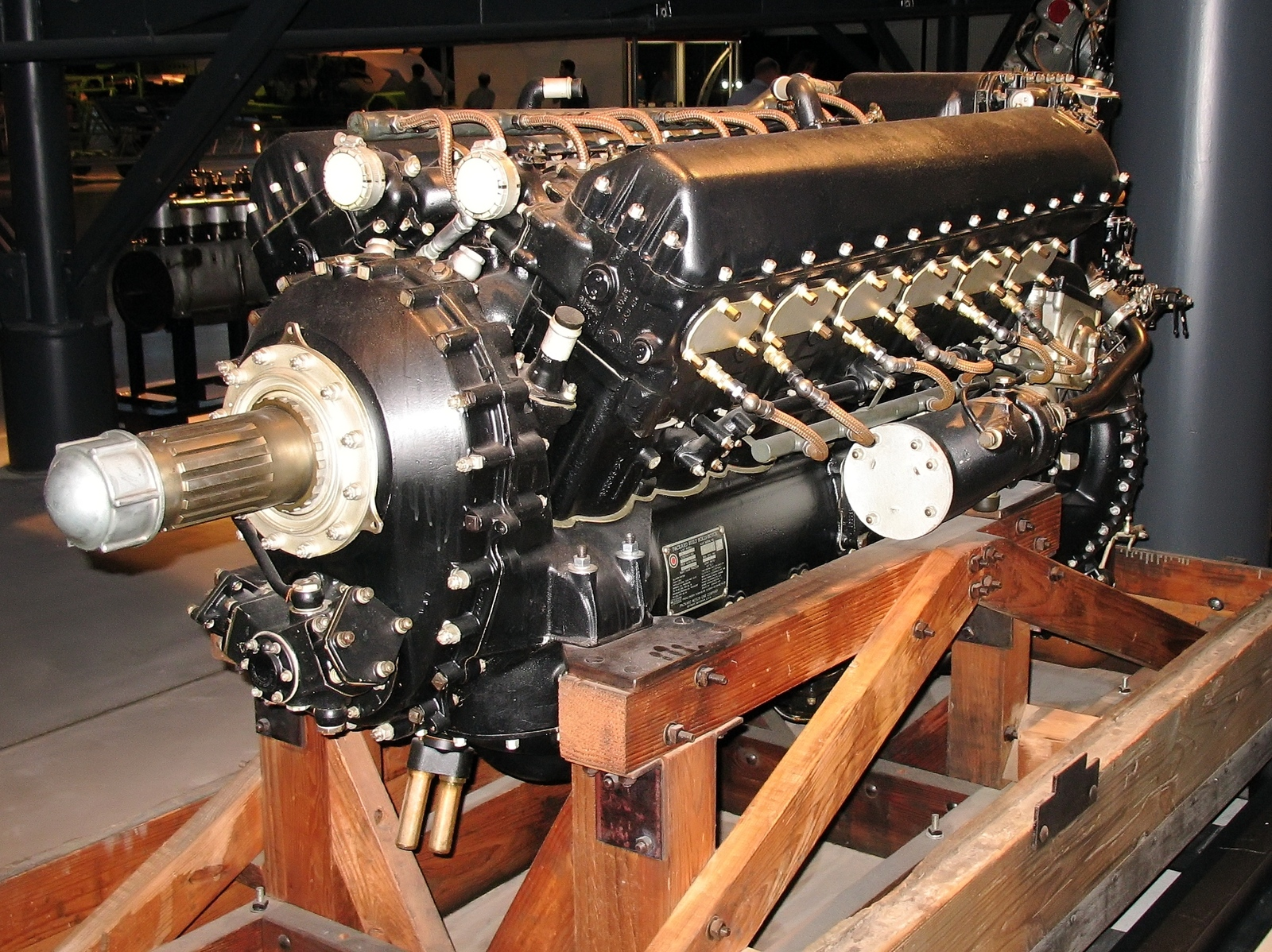
- Packard V-1650-7 Merlin
- Type: Liquid-cooled V12 piston engine
- National origin: United Kingdom/United States
- Manufacturer: Packard
- First run: August 1941
- Major applications: North American P-51 Mustang; Supermarine Spitfire; Avro Lancaster
- Number built: 55,523
- Developed from: Rolls-Royce Merlin

The Packard V-1650 Merlin is a version of the Rolls-Royce Merlin aircraft engine, produced under license in the United States by the Packard Motor Car Company. The engine was licensed to expand production of the Rolls-Royce Merlin for British use, though it also was used in the U.S. at a time when similarly powered American-made engines were not available.

The first V-1650s, with a one-stage supercharger, equivalent to the Merlin XX, were used in the P-40F Kittyhawk fighter and in Canadian Car and Foundry Hawker Hurricanes. Later versions based on the Merlin 60 series included a more advanced two-stage supercharger for improved performance at high altitudes. The V-1650 found its most notable application in the North American P-51 Mustang fighter aircraft, improving its performance and making it capable of escorting Allied heavy bombers to Germany or Japan and back.

== Design and development ==
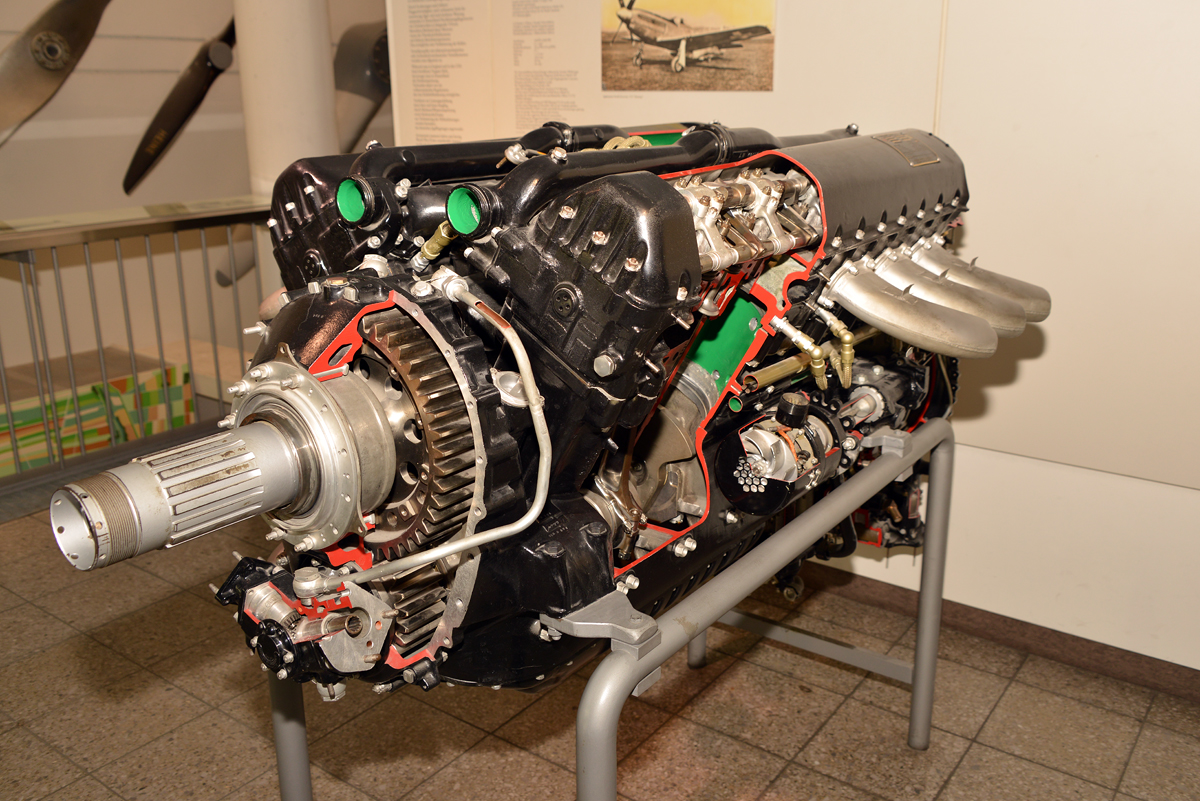
Packard V-1650 in Deutsches Museum München

At the outbreak of World War Two, the British aviation industry expanded greatly. There was great need for the Rolls-Royce Merlin engine with shadow factories being established in Crewe, Manchester, and Glasgow. This was not enough to meet increasing demand with the British government looking to expand production using U.S. manufacturers. An agreement was reached between Rolls-Royce and the Packard Motor Car Company in September 1940 to manufacture the Merlin under license, with a $130,000,000 order being placed. The first Packard-built engine, designated V-1650-1, ran in August 1941.

The first American model was a version of the Mark XX, designated the V-1650-1 by the American military and the Packard Merlin 28 by the British. This engine used a single-stage, two-speed supercharger, the gear changing mechanism of which originally came from a French Farman patent license. The Merlin 28 was used for the Avro Lancaster bomber. The USAAF V-1650-1 version of this engine was used in the Curtiss P-40Fs. The initial Packard modifications to this engine changed the main crankshaft bearings from a copper-lead alloy to a silver-lead combination and featured indium plating. The bearing coating improved the break-in (running-in) and load-carrying abilities of the surface.

In answer to a request from the British Air Ministry for a high-altitude Merlin for the pressurised Wellington VI high-altitude bomber, a Rolls-Royce team under the direction of Stanley Hooker developed a Merlin with two-stage supercharging, which became the Merlin 60-series. The first 60-series engine ran in March 1941, and was first flown in July the same year. When only 63 examples of the otherwise-cancelled Wellington VI were produced, these engines were instead introduced on the Spitfire IX as the Merlin 61.

This model was later produced by Packard as the V-1650-3 and became known as the "high altitude" Merlin destined for the P-51, the first two-stage Merlin-Mustang conversion flying with a Merlin 65 as the Mustang X in October 1942, the production V-1650-3 engined P-51B (Mustang III) entering service in 1943. The two-speed, two-stage supercharger section of the two-stage Merlins and V-1650-3 featured two separate impellers on the same shaft that were normally driven through a gear train at a ratio of 6.391:1. A hydraulic gear change arrangement of oil-operated clutches could be engaged by an electric solenoid to increase this ratio to 8.095:1 in high speed blower position.

The high speed gear ratio of the impellers was not as high as the ratio used in the Allison, but impeller speed is not the only factor that determines engine performance, which is also a function of the size and pitch of the impeller blades. The gear-driven supercharger is a parasitic accessory; therefore, impeller gearing and blade profiles are carefully designed for maximum power at altitude without compromise of available power at the critical take off stage of flight. The double staging of the compressed fuel/air mixture provided the boost pressure through a diffuser to the intake manifolds that increased the critical altitude of the power plant.

The ability of the supercharger to maintain a sea level pressure in the induction system to the cylinders allowed the Packard Merlin to develop more than 1,270 horsepower (950 kW) above 30,000 feet (9,100 m). The two-stage impeller created extreme heating of the fuel/air mixture during the compression process, and, to prevent detonation of the compressed charge, it was necessary to cool the mixture prior to entry into the cylinders. The cooling was accomplished in an intercooler passage cast into the wheel case housing between the first and second-stage impellers and an additional cooling fin and tube core placed between the outlet of the blower and the induction manifold to the cylinders. Ethylene glycol coolant was circulated by a pump through these to carry off the excess heat generated by the impellers. Without the intercooler the temperature increase in the charge could be as high as 205 °C (401 °F). The glycol mixture used for cooling was independent of the main engine cooling system and used a centrifugal pump driven by the engine to circulate the coolant through an aircraft radiator system at a maximum rate of 36 U.S. gallons (136 litres, 30 Imperial gallons) per minute, depending on engine rpm. This combined system reduced the charge temperature to suitable levels.

Throttle valves in the updraft carburettor throat were controlled by an automatic boost control through the throttle linkage to maintain the selected manifold pressure with changes in altitude. The valves were only partially open during ground and low-level operation to prevent overboosting of the engine. As air density decreases with increased altitude, the throttle valves were progressively opened in response to the reducing atmospheric pressure. This system provided full power within engine boost limitations up to the critical altitude of 26,000 feet (7,900 m).

=== Measurement of boost pressure ===
The British measured boost pressure as lbf/in^{2} (psi). The normal atmospheric pressure at sea level is 14.7 psi, so a reading of +6 means that the air/fuel mix is being compressed by a supercharger blower to 20.7 psi before entering the engine; +25 means that the air/fuel mix is now being compressed to 39.7 psi.

The Americans measured their boost ratings using inches of mercury (inHg). One pound-force per square inch equals 2.036 inHg or 6.895 kPa, and a standard atmosphere is 101.325 kPa =29.92 inHg =14.70 lbf/in^{2}. In early Merlin engines the maximum manifold (boost) pressure was +12 on 100 octane fuel. This was increased in later models.

Inches of mercury (inHg) absolute pressure	Pounds per square inch of boost gauge pressure
81 inHg=	+25 lbf/in^{2} boost
66.5 inHg=	+18 lbf/in^{2} boost
60 inHg=	+15 lbf/in^{2} boost
46 inHg=	+8 lbf/in^{2} boost
42 inHg=	+6 lbf/in^{2} boost

=== Postwar use ===
In the United States many war surplus engines and airframes were sold relatively cheaply – two of the most popular items were North American P-51 Mustangs and Packard V-1650 Merlin engines, several of which were "souped up" and modified for air racing in the Bendix Trophy, the Cleveland Air Races, and the Thompson Trophy. Many of these engines remain heavily used to this day in Drag Racing, Hydroplane racing, and Land Speed Racing at places like the Bonneville Salt Flats. The Mynarski Lancaster flown by the Canadian Warplane Heritage Museum in Hamilton, Ontario, Canada, one of only two Lancasters flying in the world, uses four Packard Merlin engines.

Work continues on increasing the power output of the Merlin for the Unlimited Class racers at the Reno Air Races. Innovations, such as the use of Allison V-1710 connecting rods and the replacement of the intercooler with ADI (Anti-Detonation Injection) (50% Distilled Water and 50% Methanol), nearly identical in chemical composition to the Luftwaffe's wartime MW 50 system, and similar to the water injection system used on Pratt & Whitney engines during World War II, have allowed great increases in power output. Many of the fastest Unlimited racers increase Merlin manifold pressures as high as 145 inHg (56.6 psi, 4.8 atm) to obtain up to 2,835 kW (3,800 horsepower), achieving Mustang speeds up to 490 mph.

== Variants ==
- V-1650-1: 1,390 hp (1,040 kW); Based on Merlin 28, used in P-40 Kittyhawk and Curtiss XP-60 fighters
- V-1650-3: 1,280 hp (950 kW); Based on Merlin 63.
- V-1650-5: 1,400 hp (1,000 kW); Experimental.
- V-1650-7: 1,315 hp (981 kW); Similar to Merlin 66, primary powerplant of the P-51D Mustang.
- V-1650-9: 1,380 hp (1,030 kW); Based on Merlin 100-series, 2,218 hp WEP with Water methanol injection.
- V-1650-9A: 1,380 hp (1,030 kW); as 9 with non-water injection for the P-51M
- V-1650-11: 1,380 hp (1,030 kW); Modified fuel system.
- V-1650-21: 1,380 hp (1,030 kW); Opposite rotation for P-82 Twin Mustang
- V-1650-23:
- V-1650-25:

== Applications ==
- Avro Lancaster B.III/B.X
- Bell XP-63 Kingcobra
- Curtiss P-40F/L/Kittyhawk Mk.II
- Curtiss P-60
- de Havilland Mosquito B.VII/B.25
- Hawker Hurricane Mk.X, XI, XII
- North American P-51 Mustang
- North American F-82 Twin Mustang
- Supermarine Spitfire Mk.XVI

== Specifications (V-1650) ==
=== General characteristics ===
- Type: 12-cylinder supercharged liquid-cooled 60° "Vee" piston aircraft engine
- Bore: 5.4 in (137.16 mm)
- Stroke: 6 in (152.4 mm)
- Displacement: 1,649 in^{3} (27.04 L)
- Length: 88.7 in (2,253 mm)
- Width: 30.8 in (781 mm)
- Height: 40 in (1016 mm)
- Dry weight: 1,645 lb (746 kg)

=== Components ===
- Valvetrain: SOHC, two intake and two exhaust valves per cylinder, sodium-cooled exhaust valve stems
- Supercharger: Two-speed two-stage, boost pressure automatically linked to the throttle, water-air aftercooler installed between the second stage and the engine.
- Fuel system: Twin-choke updraft carburetor with automatic mixture control
- Fuel type: 100 Octane, from mid 1944 100/150 Grade Aviation fuel
- Oil system: Dry sump with one pressure pump and two scavenge pumps.
- Cooling system: 70% water and 30% ethylene glycol coolant mixture, pressurized.

=== Performance ===
- Power output: Approx. 1380–1400 hp
- Compression ratio: 6:1
- Power-to-weight ratio: 0.80 hp/lb (1.73 kW/kg) take-off; 1.21 hp/lb (2.69 kW/kg) 100/150 grade fuel/MS gear.

== See also ==
Related development

- Rolls-Royce Merlin

Comparable engines

- Allison V-1710
- Daimler-Benz DB 601
- Junkers Jumo 213
- Klimov VK-107
- Mikulin AM-35

Related lists

- List of aircraft engines
