= CAC Mustang =

Australian fighter aircraft

CA-17/CA-18/CA-21 Mustang
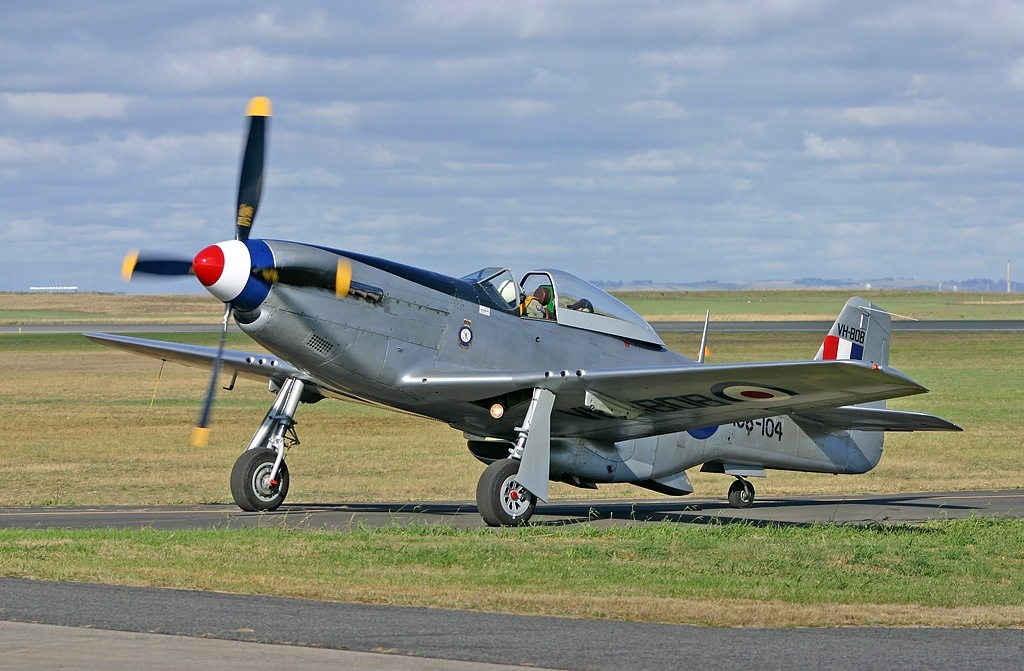
- CA-18 Mustang Mk 21 in 2005

General information
- Type: Fighter
- National origin: Australia
- Manufacturer: Commonwealth Aircraft Corporation
- Primary user: Royal Australian Air Force
- Number built: 200

History
- Introduction date: 4 June 1945
- First flight: 29 April 1945
- Retired: 1959 (Citizen Air Force)
- Developed from: North American P-51 Mustang

The CAC Mustang is an Australian variant of the North American P-51 Mustang. It was built under license by Commonwealth Aircraft Corporation in the final stages of World War II, and though it was too late to see combat, it did participate in the Occupation of Japan after VJ-Day.

== Design and development ==
=== Local assembly of the P-51D (CA-17; Mk 20) ===
In December 1942, the Australian War Cabinet began looking to acquire a fighter aircraft with greater range than the Supermarine Spitfire. As a result, arrangements were made in November 1943 for Commonwealth Aircraft Corporation to build 690 aircraft through kits supplied by North American Aviation (NAA). Only the first 100 unassembled aircraft were delivered, and four reportedly had the "razorback" style canopy of the P-51B/C variant. 80 of the kits were assembled under the designation CA-17 Mustang Mk 20 with Packard V-1650-3 Merlin engines, the remainder being used for spare parts. The end of the war led to most of the orders being cancelled.

=== Local manufacturing of the CA-18 Mustang (Mk 21–23) ===
In late 1946, CAC received a contract to build 170 (later reduced to 120) Mustangs locally from scratch. These aircraft carried the new designation CA-18.

- The first 40 were designated Mustang Mk 21 and powered by Packard V-1650-7 Merlins. 66 Mustang Mk 23s followed with British-built Rolls-Royce Merlin 66 or 70 engines.
- A total of 14 Mustang Mk 22 reconnaissance aircraft were built with F24 cameras, and a further 14 were converted from Mk 21s.

Additional orders for the CA-18, as well as 250 aircraft designated CA-21, were canceled in favor of further, US-built P-51D and P-51K variants.

== Operational history ==
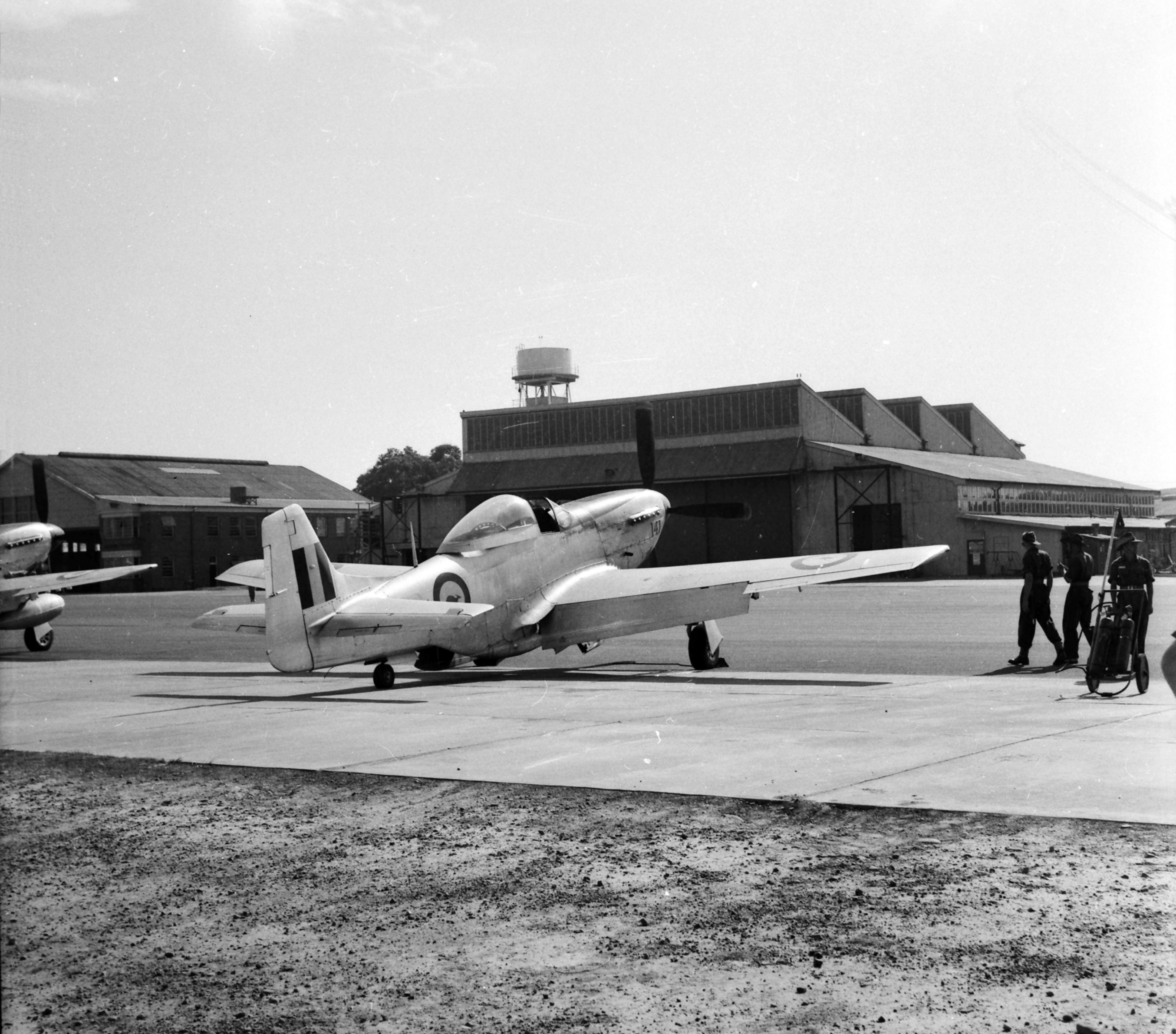
CA-18 Mustang Mk 23 at RAAF Richmond in 1958.

The first production CA-17 Mustang Mk 20, serial number A68-01 (not to be confused with the US-built prototype A68-1001), made its first flight on 29 April 1945 from Fishermans Bend. The aircraft was handed over to the RAAF on 4 June 1945 and was tested by the No. 1 Aircraft Performance Unit. Trials ended in October 1946, and the aircraft was placed in storage until 1953. Only 17 CA-17s were delivered to the RAAF by VJ-Day.

The first operational units to receive the CAC Mustang were No. 84 and No. 86 Squadron. Additional squadrons equipped with Mustangs (both American and locally-built) were No. 3, No. 4, No. 76, No. 77, and No. 82 Squadron as well as No. 21, No. 22, No. 23, No. 24, and No. 25 Squadron of the Citizen Air Force. The RAAF replaced its last Mustangs with de Havilland Vampires in 1959, while the last Mustang-equipped Citizen Air Force squadron, No. 24, retained its Mustangs until the CAF was disbanded in 1960.

== Variants ==
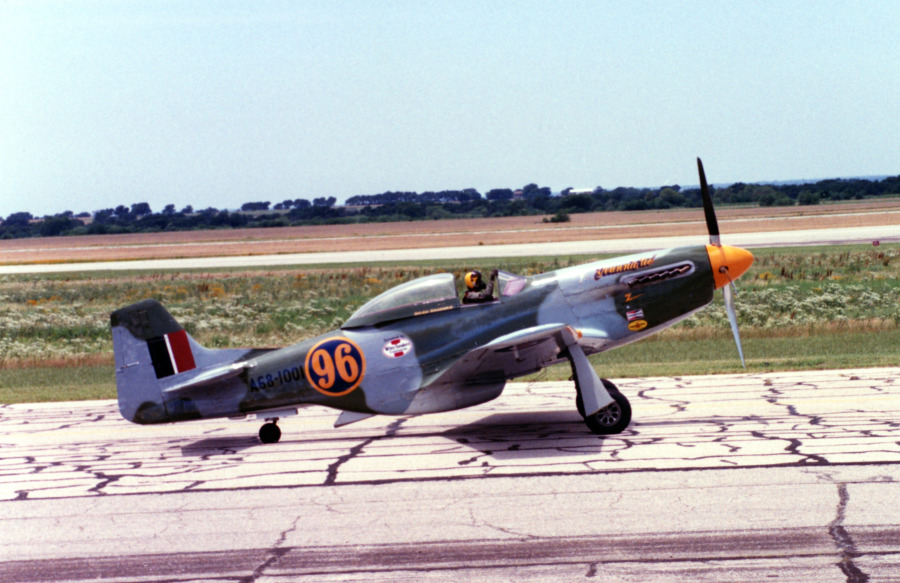
A68-1, the first production CA-17 Mustang Mk 20, as a warbird in 1990. This aircraft is painted in fictitious RAAF colors with the serial number "A68-1001", which belonged to the US-built prototype.

CA-17 Mustang Mk 20
Aircraft built from kits supplied by NAA with V-1650-3 engines. 80 built.
CA-18 Mustang Mk 21
Locally-built aircraft with V-1650-7 engines. 40 built.
CA-18 Mustang Mk 22
Reconnaissance variant with F24 cameras. 14 newly built aircraft and 14 converted from Mk 21s.
CA-18 Mustang Mk 23
Variant with British Merlin 66 or 70 engines. 66 built.
CA-21
250 ordered but not built.
Dart Mustang
Civilian modification of a CA-18 Mustang with a Rolls-Royce Dart turboprop engine. 1 modified from a Mustang Mk 22 but never flown in this configuration.

== Surviving aircraft ==
Australia

- A68-71 – CA-17 Mustang Mk 20 under restoration for display in Melbourne, Victoria.
- A68-104 – CA-18 Mustang Mk 21 airworthy.
- A68-105 – CA-18 Mustang Mk 21 airworthy at Tyabb, Victoria. Owned by Judy Pay and Richard Hourigan and painted as Mustang Mk IV KH677/CV-P.
- A68-107 – CA-18 Mustang Mk 21 airworthy at Pay's Air Service in Scone, New South Wales.
- A68-110 – CA-18 Mustang Mk 21 airworthy at Caboolture Warplane Museum in Caboolture, Queensland. Painted as P-51D A68-769.
- A68-118 – CA-18 Mustang Mk 21 airworthy at Morwell, Victoria. Owned by Jeff Trappett.
- A68-137 – CA-18 Mustang Mk 23 in storage.
- A68-170 "Duffy's Delight" – CA-18 Mustang Mk 23 airworthy with the Air Force Heritage Squadron, RAAF Base Point Cook.
- A68-199 – CA-18 Mustang Mk 22 airworthy at Shellharbour Airport, New South Wales. Owned by Shaun Browne.

United Kingdom

- A68-5 – remains of scrapped CA-17 Mustang Mk 20 in storage at Classic Flying Machine Collection.

United States

- A68-1 – CA-17 Mustang Mk 20 airworthy painted as P-51D 44-15757 "Jeannie Too". Privately owned in Troy, Alabama.
- A68-39 – CA-17 Mustang Mk 20 airworthy at Erickson Aircraft Collection in Madras, Oregon. Painted as P-51D 44-14826.
- A68-100 – CA-18 Mustang Mk 21 airworthy painted as P-51D 44-14777 "Flying Dutchman". Privately owned in Snellville, Georgia.
- A68-175 – CA-18 Mustang Mk 23 airworthy painted as P-51D 44-74950 "Slender Tender Tall". Privately owned in Wilmington, Delaware.
- A68-187 – CA-18 Mustang Mk 22 airworthy at Lewis Air Legends in San Antonio, Texas. Painted as P-51D 44-74839 "La Pistolera".
- A68-198 – CA-18 Mustang Mk 22 airworthy painted as P-51D 45-11483 "Short-Fuse-Salle". Privately owned in Ozona, Texas.

== Replica ==
A full-scale replica of a CA-18 Mustang Mk 23 is located at the Queensland Air Museum at the Caloundra Airport. Construction of the replica began in May 2005 and was placed on static display on 27 December 2008. It carries the fictitious serial number A68-201, continuing the original sequence which ended with A68-200.

== Accidents and incidents ==
- 12 April 1962 – CA-18 Mustang Mk 21, G-ARUK (ex-A68-113), piloted by Ron Flockhart, entered a cloud and crashed into the Dandenong Ranges in Victoria, Australia. Flockhart was killed in the accident.
- 27 June 1970 – CA-18 Mustang Mk 22, VH-DBB (ex-A68-193), piloted by Donald Busch, stalled and crashed after completing a flyover at an airshow in Bendigo, Australia. The aircraft caught fire, killing Busch.
- 11 June 1973 – CA-18 Mustang Mk 21, VH-IVI (ex-A68-119), was destroyed in a crash in Sydney, Australia, killing its pilot, Raymond J. Whitebread.
- 19 October 1973 – CA-18 Mustang Mk 22, PI-C651 (ex-A68-192), crash landed at Manila International Airport in Manila, Philippines. The aircraft was subsequently rebuilt, crashing again on 10 July 2011 after suffering a mid-air collision.
- 6 June 1976 – CA-18 Mustang Mk 22 "Miss Zulu", VH-BOZ (ex-A68-199), crashed on takeoff in Bankstown, Australia. The aircraft was subsequently rebuilt, and as of 2019 it flies under the registration VH-URZ.
- 5 July 1976 – CA-17 Mustang Mk 20 "Miss Yankee", VH-BOY (ex-A68-39), crashed in Bankstown, Australia. The aircraft was subsequently rebuilt, and as of 2002 it flies under the registration N551D.
- 5 August 1993 – CA-18 Mustang Mk 22 "The Best Years Of Our Lives", F-AZIE (ex-A68-198), suffered an in-flight fire. The aircraft was badly damaged, but returned to the skies the following year. As of 2002, it flies as "Short Fuse Salle" (N286JB).
- 10 July 2011 – CA-18 Mustang Mk 22 "Big Beautiful Doll", D-FBBD (ex-A68-192), collided in mid-air with Douglas A-1D Skyraider F-AZDP (ex-Bu. 124143) in Duxford, UK. Rob Davies, the pilot of the Mustang, bailed out, and his aircraft crashed in a nearby field. The pilot of the Skyraider managed to safely land the damaged aircraft, despite losing its right wingtip. This was the same aircraft as the one that crashed on 19 October 1973.

== Specifications (CA-18 Mustang Mk 21) ==
P-51D/CA-18 Mustang

Data from

General characteristics

- Crew: 1
- Length: 9.83 m (32 ft 3 in)
- Wingspan: 11.28 m (27 ft 0 in)
- Height: 3.71 m (12 ft 2 in)
- Empty weight: 3,567 kg (7,863 lb)
- Gross weight: 4,763 kg (10,500 lb)
- Powerplant: 1 × Packard V-1650-7 Merlin liquid-cooled V12 engine, 1,110 kW (1,490 hp)
- Propellers: 4-bladed

Performance

- Maximum speed: 636 km/h (395 mph, 380 kn)
- Range: 1,529 km (950 mi, 825 nmi)
- Service ceiling: 12,771 m (41,900 ft)
- Rate of climb: 17.65 m/s (3,475 ft/min)

Armament

- Guns: 6 × 0.50 caliber (12.7mm) AN/M2 Browning machine guns
- Hardpoints: 2 x 1,000 lb (450 kg) bombs or 10 x rockets

== See also ==
Related development

- Cavalier Mustang
- North American A-36
- North American F-82 Twin Mustang
- North American FJ-1 Fury
- Piper PA-48 Enforcer
- Rolls-Royce Mustang Mk.X

Aircraft of comparable role, configuration, and era

- CAC CA-15
- Focke-Wulf Fw 190
- Focke-Wulf Ta 152
- Hawker Tempest
- Kawanishi N1K
- Kawasaki Ki-100
- Lavochkin La-9
- Messerschmitt Bf 109
- Nakajima Ki-84
- Supermarine Spitfire
- Yakovlev Yak-9

Related lists

- Allied technological cooperation during World War II
- List of aircraft of World War II
- List of fighter aircraft
