= Laredo College =

Public college in Laredo, Texas, U.S.

- Other name: Laredo Community College
- Type: Public community college
- Established: September 28, 1947
- Budget: c. $50 million (2012–2013)
- President: Ricardo Solis
- Faculty: 210 Full-time (Fall 2010); 300 classified staff
- Students: 8,749 (Fall 2015)
- Location: Main Campus: West End Washington Street South Campus: 5500 Zapata Highway, Laredo, Texas, 78040 for Main Campus 78046 for South Campus, United States
- Campus: Ft. McIntosh (Main Campus): 300 acres (1.2 km^{2}) South Campus
- Colors: Black, Gold, and Green
- Mascot: Palominos
- Website: http://www.laredo.edu

Laredo College (LC) or Laredo Community College (LCC) is a public community college in Laredo, Texas. Founded as Laredo Junior College in 1947, it is part of the Laredo Independent School District. As defined by the Texas Legislature, the official service area of LC includes the municipality of Laredo and all of Webb, Jim Hogg and Zapata counties.

== Finances and enrollments ==
=== Budgets and taxes ===
The 2012–2013 LC budget was approximately $50 million. The student tuition and fee share of the budget doubled in a decade from 18 to 36 percent.

The 2011–2012 LC budget was $48.3 million, or a decrease of $1.43 million from the preceding year.

The college property tax rate of $0.2365 per $100 of assessed valuation declined slightly in the 2012–2013 budget. Unlike many other community colleges in Texas which can reach into the county or adjoining counties for purposes of taxation, LC can levy property taxers only within the City of Laredo. Some 40 percent of the 2012–2013 LC budget is derived from property taxes.

=== Enrollment figures ===
Enrollment for the fall of 2013 was 8,732, a decrease of 602 or 6.4 percent from 2012. Enrolment peaked in 2011 at 10,046.

In 2010, LC had 210 faculty and 300 classified staff personnel.

LC enrollment dropped for the fourth consecutive year in the spring of 2015 by 4.3 percent from 2014, attributed to changes in the local employment marked.

In the fall of 2015, enrollment was 5.3 percent above that of the previous year. There were 8,749 registrants in 2015, compared to 8,307 in September 2014.

== Accreditation ==
In 2010, LC had a three-year graduation rate of 14 percent from students pursuing either associate degrees or completing specialized certificate programs.

In July 2012, Laredo College was placed on twelve months of probation for failure to comply with standards required by the Southern Association of Colleges and Schools. In a document reviewed by KGNS-TV, the NBC affiliate in Laredo, the accrediting body said that LC had not demonstrated "compliance with comprehensive standards". President Juan L. Maldonado said that the institution will meet any deficiencies required but that the situation would not impact instructional programs or other operations of the college.

On June 20, 2013, SACS restored accreditation after the process was completed to correct past deficiencies in the reports LC submitted to the agency.

Having overcome the accreditation controversy, LC was ranked tenth in 2015 among Texas' two-year colleges, which number more than seventy, by the website BestColleges.com; LC was cited for its two campuses, affordable tuition, the variety of associate degree programs, and in the quality of its nursing and allied health programs. In 2016, LC retained its tenth ranking in the same listing.

In 2016, LC ranked first in the nation in the least amount of debt accumulated by its departing students. The average debt of $2,000 at LC is a fraction of the national average of $27,000. As of 2014, student debt nationwide had increased more than 50 percent over the preceding eleven years.

== Campuses ==
=== Main campus ===
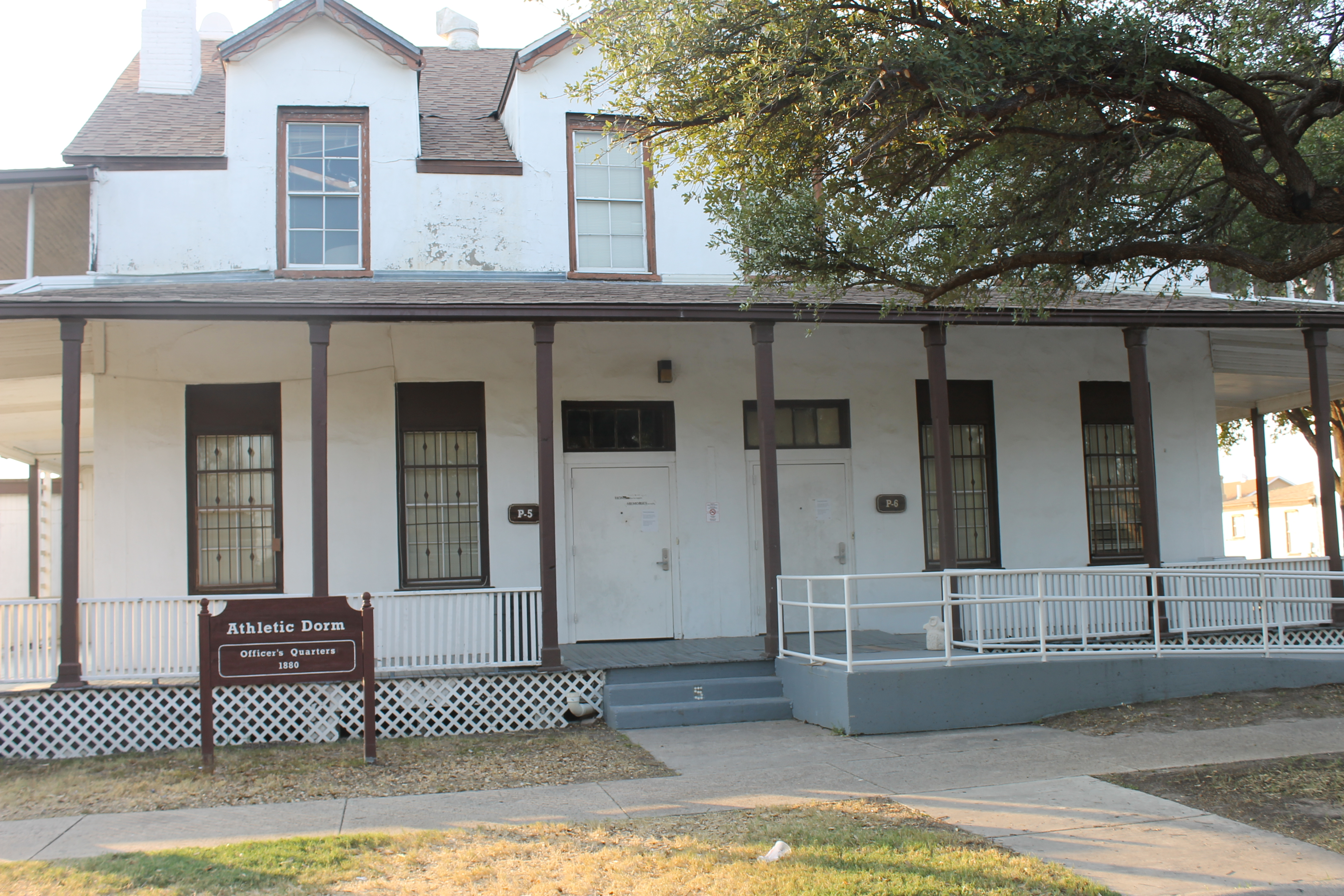
A former United States Army 1880s officers quarters at Fort McIntosh is now an athletic dormitory.

The main campus, also known as the Fort McIntosh Campus because of its location on historic Fort McIntosh, is situated at the west end of Washington Street in downtown Laredo. The campus has many of the original United States Army buildings from the old fort along with modern buildings from the 1940s to the 21st century. The campus is situated on a small hill on the bend above the Rio Grande. The campus has more than thirty buildings. Its founding president, W. J. Adkins, a native of Ellis County, Texas, served from 1947 to 1960.

In 1964, Ray A. Laird, the second LC president, commissioned a master plan for a college of 1,500 students. By the 1974–1975 term, under Laird's successor president, Domingo Arechiga, enrollment totaled 3,925.

The Martin Building, dedicated in 1970 and renovated in 2016, is named for Joseph C. Martin Sr., late president of the Laredo Independent School District board of trustees, and the father of the late Laredo Mayor J. C. "Pepe" Martin. The structure houses the information technology department, including the offices of (1) institutional research and planning and (2) institutional effectiveness.

In the spring of 2000, under President Ramón H. Dovalina, LC had 177 full-time faculty and 7,317 students.

=== South campus ===
The Laredo College South Campus, located at 5500 South Zapata Highway (U.S. Highway 83) at coordinates 27°26′N 99°29′W, was established to extend the college's mission to the growing residential area of south Laredo. More than 80 percent of voters approved a $50 million bond issue to construct the second campus, which was completed in the spring of 2004. The 60-acre (240,000 m^{2}) campus contains seven buildings and will be expanded in the future to develop athletic and recreational fields and courts. The second campus sits on a small valley near the bank of the Rio Grande.

In April 2012, the LC trustees approved feasibility studies for a new health science center and student union building on the South Campus. If considered needed, LC would add these proposed projects to the list of some forty improvements still underway on the Main Campus.

==== South campus buildings ====
Academic and Advanced Technology Center - Computer and science laboratories, lecture halls, classrooms and faculty offices fill the Academic and Advanced Technology Center. The building's first floor contains offices for the Child Development Department and the LCC Community Education Department. The second floor contains offices for the LCC Computer Electronics Department, language laboratories for the study of English and foreign languages, and distance education classrooms.

Hall Student Center - Named for the late State Representative William N. "Billy" Hall, Jr., this two-story facility is designed to become the hub of student life, including: Meeting and Conference Rooms, Bursar's Office, Financial Aid Office, Counseling Center, Admissions Office, Bookstore, Cafeteria, TV Room, Assessment Center, Mailroom, Print Services, Student Computer Resource Room, Student Employment Services, Campus Nurse, and administrative offices.

Raquel Gonzalez Automotive Technology Center -- Named for former LCC trustee Raquel Gonzalez, the center trains future mechanics in the latest techniques in automotive repair and maintenance.

Prada Child Development Center - The new LCC Child Development Laboratory is a model teaching area for LCC students who are taking early childhood development courses in preparation for education careers in the community's child care centers. It contains six classrooms for 2, 3 and 4 year-olds, a kitchen and two outdoor playgrounds. This facility is named for Camilo Prada, whose family developed the residential neighborhoods around the LCC South campus and provided student support through scholarships and other gifts.

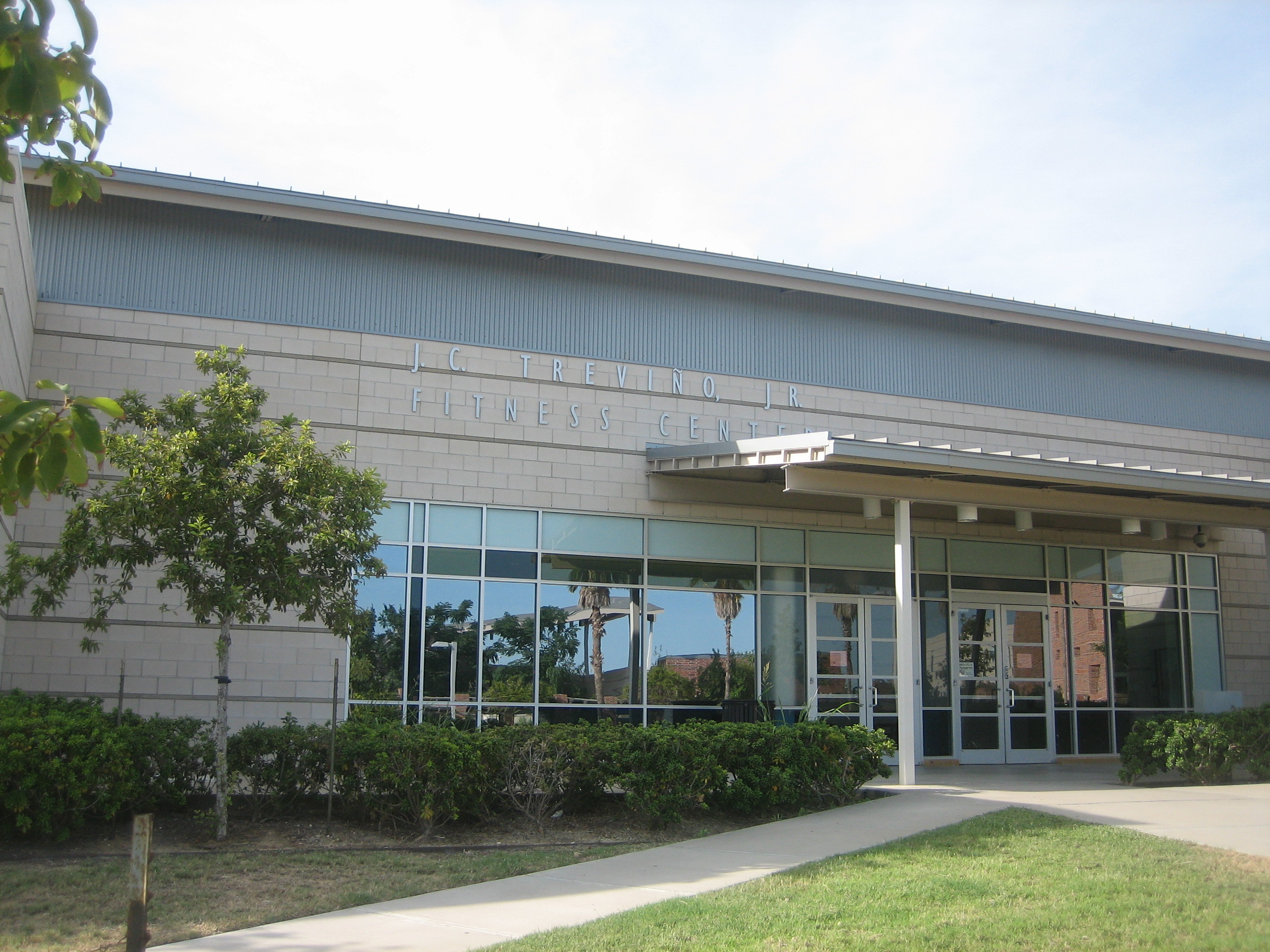
J.C. Trevino Fitness Center at Laredo Community College South Campus

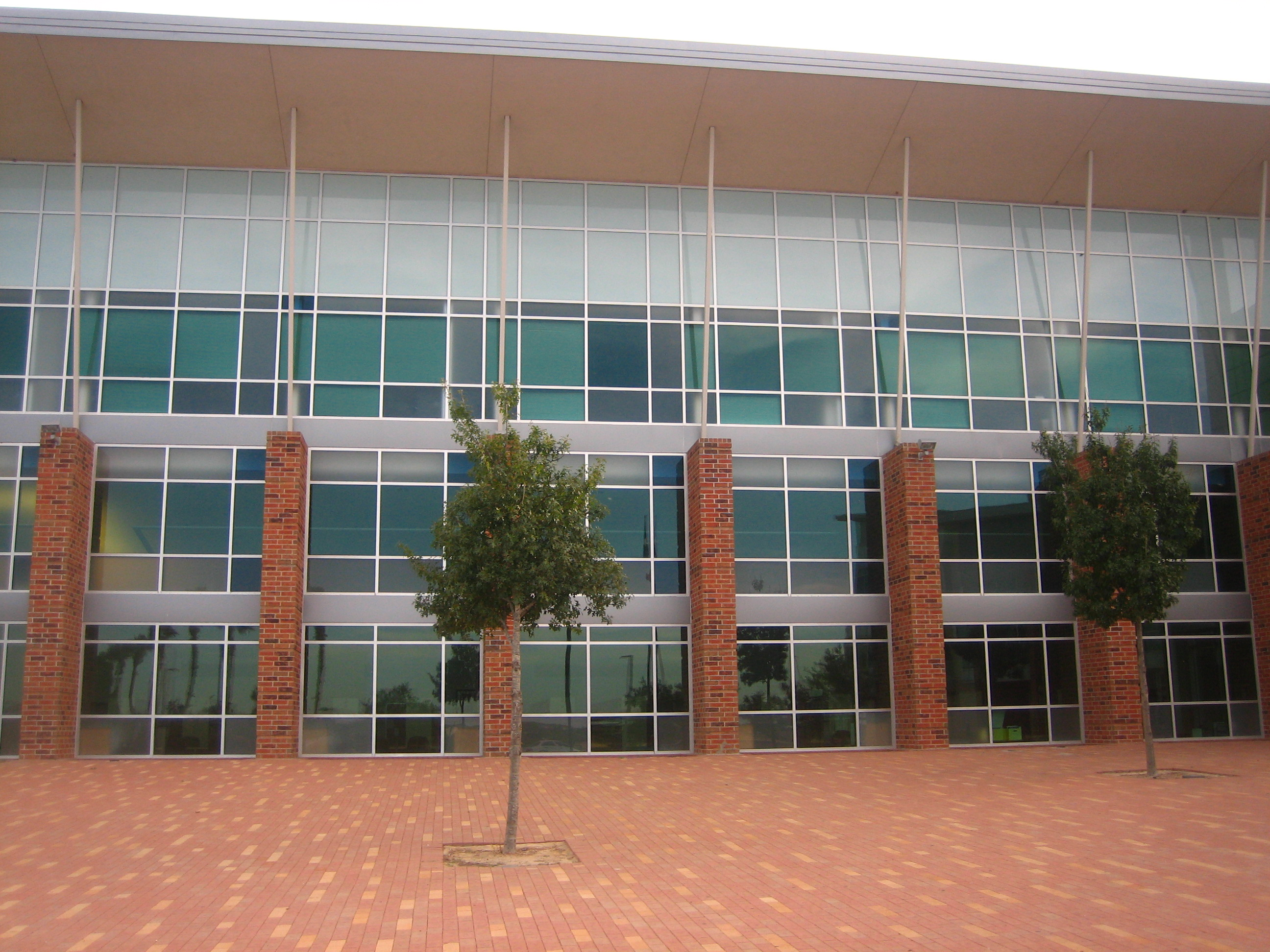
Senator Judith Zaffirini Library

Treviño Fitness Center - Named for the late LCC trustee J.C. "Pepe" Trevino, Jr., this Classroom and Fitness Center contains 13,600 square feet (1,260 m^{2}) of space that will serve all students attending classes at LCC South with a gymnasium, fitness rooms, locker rooms and a therapy room with sauna. These facilities will also be used by the Regional Police Academy for its physical training component.

Senator Judith Zaffirini Library - The Zaffirini Library named for State Senator Judith Zaffirini is located on the LCC South campus in Building B. It is equipped with a Circulation desk, Reference Desk, a Media Center, a copy room, and a computer lab where bibliographic instruction is offered. Interlibrary loan services are available online and through the Circulation Desk, and bibliographic instruction sessions can be scheduled through the Reference Desk. The library has the capacity to house 18,000 volumes. Online and Internet services are readily available throughout the building.

== Notable alumni ==
- Pete Astudillo – Singer and former member of Selena y Los Dinos
- Esther Buckley (Class of 1965, 1948–2013) – Martin High School science educator, member of the United States Commission on Civil Rights from 1983 to 1992, former chairman of the Republican Party in Webb County
- Kaleb Canales – Assistant coach of the Dallas Mavericks of the National Basketball Association; former interim head coach of the Portland Trail Blazers and at the time the youngest active head coach in the NBA, the first Mexican American NBA coach
- Henry Cuellar – U.S. representative from Texas's 28th congressional district since 2005
- Ramón H. Dovalina - LC president, 1995 to 2007, attended 1960 and 1965
- Alicia Dickerson Montemayor – Latino political activist, feminist, and community organizer
- Eman Esfandi - American actor, known for playing Ezra Bridger in Ahsoka
- Richard Raymond - state representative for Webb County since 2000
- Judith Zaffirini – Texas state senator for District 21 since 1987
