= El Cenizo, Texas =

- City
- Interactive map of El Cenizo, Texas
- Location of El Cenizo in Texas Location of El Cenizo in the US
- Coordinates: 27°19′42″N 99°29′48″W
- Country: United States
- State: Texas
- County: Webb

Government
  - Type: City Commission
  - Mayor: Elsa Degollado
  - Commissioner: Salvador Hernandez

Area
  - City: 0.53 sq mi (1.37 km^{2})
  - Land: 0.51 sq mi (1.33 km^{2})
  - Water: 0.015 sq mi (0.04 km^{2}) 1.4%
  - Metro: 161.76 sq mi (418.96 km^{2})
- Elevation: 390 ft (120 m)

Population (2020)
  - City: 2,540
  - Density: 4,950/sq mi (1,910/km^{2})
  - Metro: 636,516
  - Metro density: 3,934.9/sq mi (1,519.3/km^{2})
- metro area includes Laredo, Texas, Nuevo Laredo, Tamaulipas, Rio Bravo, Texas, El Cenizo, Texas, Laredo Ranchettes, Texas. Larga Vista, Texas, Ranchos Penitas West, Texas, & La Presa, Texas
- Time zone: UTC-6 (CST)
  - Summer (DST): UTC-5 (CST)
- Zip Code: 78043
- Area code: +1-956
- FIPS code: 48-22905
- GNIS feature ID: 1377764
- Website: https://www.cityofelcenizotexas.com
- Nearby airports: Laredo: Laredo International Airport KLRD LRD; Nuevo Laredo: Quetzalcoatl International Airport MMNL NLD

El Cenizo is a city in Webb County, Texas, United States. The population was 2,540 at the 2020 census. El Cenizo is the third-largest city in Webb County. It is located about 20 miles south of the county seat of Laredo.

== History ==
For many years, El Cenizo existed only informally as an impoverished colonia. The city was incorporated in 1989.

In 1999 and again in May 2006, El Cenizo gained national attention when it was widely reported that the city had Spanish as its official language. In an interview on a national cable news network held on May 23, 2006, its mayor defended the decision, but said that official business was now conducted in both English and Spanish. He also said that while he supported English as the common and unifying language of the United States, he believed that any attempt to make English the "official" national language would have a discriminatory effect against bilingual programs.

On May 12, 2017, following the passage of SB4, a bill in the Texas Legislature intended to crack down on sanctuary cities, El Cenizo filed a lawsuit claiming that the bill illegally commandeers local officials to enforce federal immigration law. On June 7, 2017, El Cenizo's lawsuit was consolidated with lawsuits filed by much larger cities including San Antonio, Austin, and Dallas, with El Cenizo as the lead plaintiff.

== Geography ==
According to the United States Census Bureau, the city has a total area of 0.5 square miles (1.4 km^{2}), of which 0.5 square miles (1.3 km^{2}) is land and 1.89% is covered by water.

== Demographics ==
Historical population
Census	Pop.	Note	%±
1990	1,399		—
2000	3,545		153.4%
2010	3,273		−7.7%
2020	2,540		−22.4%
U.S. Decennial Census

=== 2020 census ===
As of the 2020 census, El Cenizo had a population of 2,540. The median age was 30.6 years; 30.8% of residents were under the age of 18 and 10.3% were 65 years of age or older. For every 100 females there were 100.2 males, and for every 100 females age 18 and over there were 98.4 males age 18 and over.

0.0% of residents lived in urban areas, while 100.0% lived in rural areas.

There were 681 households in El Cenizo, of which 52.7% had children under the age of 18 living in them. Of all households, 49.5% were married-couple households, 16.6% were households with a male householder and no spouse or partner present, and 27.3% were households with a female householder and no spouse or partner present. About 12.2% of all households were made up of individuals and 4.9% had someone living alone who was 65 years of age or older. There were 766 housing units, of which 11.1% were vacant; the homeowner vacancy rate was 4.1% and the rental vacancy rate was 23.6%.

Racial composition as of the 2020 census
Race	Number	Percent
White	827	32.6%
Black or African American	7	0.3%
American Indian and Alaska Native	7	0.3%
Asian	0	0.0%
Native Hawaiian and Other Pacific Islander	1	0.0%
Some other race	865	34.1%
Two or more races	833	32.8%
Hispanic or Latino (of any race)	2,480	97.6%

=== 2000 census ===
As of the census of 2000, 3,545 people, 730 households, and 680 families resided in the city. The population density was 6,919.6 inhabitants per square mile (2,671.7/km^{2}). The 811 housing units averaged 1,583.0/sq mi (614.0/km^{2}). The racial makeup of the city was 80.73% White, 0.28% African American, 1.07% Native American, 0.06% Asian, 14.67% from other races, and 3.19% from two or more races. Hispanics or Latinos of any race were 98.90% of the population.

Of the 730 households, 72.6% had children under the age of 18 living with them, 67.8% were married couples living together, 19.0% had a female householder with no husband present, and 6.8% were not families; 6.0% of all households were made up of individuals, and 3.3% had someone living alone who was 65 years of age or older. The average household size was 4.86 and the average family size was 5.04.

In the city, the population was distributed as 48.9% under the age of 18, 11.2% from 18 to 24, 25.2% from 25 to 44, 10.9% from 45 to 64, and 3.8% who were 65 years of age or older. The median age was 18 years. For every 100 females, there were 102.2 males. For every 100 females age 18 and over, there were 96.4 males.

The median income for a household in the city was $13,333, and for a family was $13,438. Males had a median income of $14,200 versus $10,625 for females. The per capita income for the city was $3,610. About 66.3% of families and 68.1% of the population were below the poverty line, including 74.3% of those under age 18 and 60.0% of those age 65 or over.

== Education ==
El Cenizo is served by the United Independent School District.

El Cenizo is zoned to Kennedy-Zapata Elementary School (unincorporated Webb County), Salvador Garcia Middle School (Rio Bravo), and Lyndon B. Johnson High School (Laredo). Kennedy-Zapata is adjacent to El Cenizo.

The designated community college for Webb County is Laredo College.

== Government ==
El Cenizo is a Type C General Law city. It has a city commission form of government, which includes a mayor and two city commissioners elected at large. The city is currently governed by Mayor Carina Hernandez .

== Parks and recreation ==
Webb County operates the El Cenizo Community Center.
