= Rio Bravo, Texas =

City in Webb County, Texas, United States

Rio Bravo
- City
- Interactive map of Rio Bravo
- Country: United States
- State: Texas
- County: Webb

Government
  - Type: Mayor
  - Mayor: Amanda Perez Aguero

Area
  - City: 0.66 sq mi (1.72 km^{2})
  - Land: 0.65 sq mi (1.68 km^{2})
  - Water: 0.015 sq mi (0.04 km^{2}) 1.4%
  - Metro: 161.76 sq mi (418.96 km^{2})
- Elevation: 407 ft (124 m)

Population (2020)
  - City: 4,450
  - Density: 6,860/sq mi (2,650/km^{2})
  - Metro: 636,516
  - Metro density: 3,934.9/sq mi (1,519.3/km^{2})
- Time zone: UTC-6 (CST)
  - Summer (DST): UTC-5 (CST)
- Zip Code: 78046
- Area code: +1-956
- FIPS code: 48-62138
- GNIS feature ID: 1388239
- Website: https://www.riobravotx.com/
- Nearby Airports: Laredo: Laredo International Airport KLRD LRD; Nuevo Laredo: Quetzalcoatl International Airport MMNL NLD

Rio Bravo is a city in Webb County, in the American state of Texas. It lies sixteen miles south of Laredo on Highway 83, on the left bank of the Rio Grande (Spanish: Rio Bravo). Founded in 1982 by Cecil McDonald, a property developer who also founded neighboring El Cenizo, Rio Bravo was incorporated as a city in 1989. It had a population of 4,450 at the time of the 2020 census.

== Geography ==
According to the United States Census Bureau, the city has a total area of 0.7 square mile (1.8 km^{2}), of which 0.7 square mile (1.8 km^{2}) is land and 1.45% is covered by water.

== Demographics ==
Historical population
Census	Pop.	Note	%±
2000	5,553		—
2010	4,794		−13.7%
2020	4,450		−7.2%
U.S. Decennial Census

=== 2020 census ===
As of the 2020 census, Rio Bravo had a population of 4,450, with 1,172 households and 797 families; the median age was 28.3 years, 34.0% of residents were under the age of 18, and 10.2% were 65 years of age or older. For every 100 females there were 93.8 males, and for every 100 females age 18 and over there were 90.2 males age 18 and over.

There were 1,172 households in Rio Bravo, of which 52.0% had children under the age of 18 living with them. Of all households, 52.3% were married-couple households, 13.9% were households with a male householder and no spouse or partner present, and 30.2% were households with a female householder and no spouse or partner present. About 14.4% of all households were made up of individuals and 5.4% had someone living alone who was 65 years of age or older.

There were 1,313 housing units, of which 10.7% were vacant. The homeowner vacancy rate was 1.4% and the rental vacancy rate was 10.7%.

0.0% of residents lived in urban areas, while 100.0% lived in rural areas.

Racial composition as of the 2020 census
Race	Number	Percent
White	2,835	63.7%
Black or African American	11	0.2%
American Indian and Alaska Native	14	0.3%
Asian	2	0.0%
Native Hawaiian and Other Pacific Islander	0	0.0%
Some other race	739	16.6%
Two or more races	849	19.1%
Hispanic or Latino (of any race)	4,360	98.0%

=== 2013 ===
As of the updated census of 2013, 4,852 people, 1,204 households, and 1,122 families resided in the city. The population density was 8,153.4 inhabitants per square mile (3,148.0/km^{2}). The 1,347 housing units averaged 1,977.8/sq mi (764.8/km^{2}). The racial makeup of the city was 78.61% White, 0.34% African American, 0.99% Native American, 0.02% Asian, 0.02% Pacific Islander, 16.62% from other races, and 3.40% from two or more races. Hispanics or Latinos of any race were 97.69% of the population.

Of the 1,204 households, 70.7% had children under the age of 18 living with them, 74.1% were married couples living together, 15.2% had a female householder with no husband present, and 6.8% were not families. About 6.2% of all households were made up of individuals, and 2.6% had someone living alone who was 65 years of age or older. The average household size was 4.61, and the average family size was 4.82.

In the city, the population was distributed as 45.8% under the age of 18, 12.3% from 18 to 24, 25.8% from 25 to 44, 12.0% from 45 to 64, and 4.1% who were 65 years of age or older. The median age was 20 years. For every 100 females, there were 96.1 males. For every 100 females age 18 and over, there were 90.3 males.

The median income for a household in the city was $26,816.00 per family, and for a family was $17,513. Males had a median income of $14,265 versus $12,222 for females. The per capita income for the city was $4,566. About 53.4% of families and 57.6% of the population were below the poverty line, including 64.1% of those under age 18 and 55.1% of those age 65 or over.

== Education ==
Rio Bravo is served by the United Independent School District.

All of Rio Bravo is zoned to Juarez-Lincoln Elementary School (which is located at the former United D.D. Hachar Elementary School), Salvador Garcia Middle School (Laredo), and Lyndon B. Johnson High School (Laredo). Garcia is adjacent to the Rio Bravo city limits.

The eastern half of Rio Bravo used to be zoned to United D.D. Hachar Elementary School in unincorporated Webb County. The western half used to be zoned to Juarez-Lincoln Elementary School in unincorporated Webb County. The Hachar Foundation donated the land on which the United DD Hachar school was built on in 1989. The former Juarez-Lincoln Elementary, which opened in 1993, is now used as Step Academy.

The designated community college for Webb County is Laredo College.

== See also ==
- List of municipalities in Texas
