= Colorado Acres, Texas =

- Census-designated place
- Location within Texas
- Coordinates: 27°38′42″N 99°12′51″W
- Country: United States
- State: Texas
- County: Webb

Area
  - Total: 2.93 sq mi (7.6 km^{2})
  - Land: 2.93 sq mi (7.6 km^{2})
  - Water: 0.00 sq mi (0 km^{2})
- Elevation: 561 ft (171 m)

Population (2020)
  - Total: 127
  - Density: 43.3/sq mi (16.7/km^{2})
- Time zone: UTC-6 (Central (CST))
  - Summer (DST): UTC-5 (CDT)
- ZIP code: 78044
- GNIS feature ID: 2584622

Colorado Acres is a census-designated place in Webb County, Texas, United States. As of the 2020 census, Colorado Acres had a population of 127. This was a new CDP, formed from parts of the Ranchitos Las Lomas CDP prior to the 2010 census.

It is one of several colonias in the county.

== Geography ==
Colorado Acres is located at 27°38′42″N 99°12′51″W (27.644901, -99.214301) along U.S. Highway 59 in east-central Webb County. According to the United States Census Bureau, the CDP has a total area of 2.93 square miles (7.6 km^{2}), all land.

== Demographics ==
Historical population
Census	Pop.	Note	%±
2010	296		—
2020	127		−57.1%
U.S. Decennial Census; 1850–1900 1910; 1920 1930 1940; 1950 1960 1970; 1980 1990 2000; 2010

Colorado Acres first appeared as a census-designated place in the 2010 U.S. census, one of seven CDPs (Colorado Acres, Hillside Acres, Las Haciendas, Las Pilas, Los Veteranos I, Pueblo East, and Valle Verde) were formed out the Ranchitos Las Lomas CDP.

=== 2020 census ===
Colorado Acres CDP, Texas – Racial and ethnic composition Note: the US Census treats Hispanic/Latino as an ethnic category. This table excludes Latinos from the racial categories and assigns them to a separate category. Hispanics/Latinos may be of any race.
Race / Ethnicity (NH = Non-Hispanic)	Pop 2010	Pop 2020	% 2010	% 2020
White alone (NH)	0	0	0.00%	0.00%
Black or African American alone (NH)	0	0	0.00%	0.00%
Native American or Alaska Native alone (NH)	0	0	0.00%	0.00%
Asian alone (NH)	0	0	0.00%	0.00%
Native Hawaiian or Pacific Islander alone (NH)	0	0	0.00%	0.00%
Other race alone (NH)	0	0	0.00%	0.00%
Mixed race or Multiracial (NH)	2	0	0.68%	0.00%
Hispanic or Latino (any race)	294	127	99.32%	100.00%
Total	296	127	100.00%	100.00%

== Education ==
Residents are in the United Independent School District. Zoned schools include: Dr. Henry Cuellar Elementary School, Antonio Gonzalez Middle School, and United South High School.

The designated community college for Webb County is Laredo Community College.
