= San Carlos II, Texas =

- CDP
- Interactive map of San Carlos II, Texas
- Coordinates: 27°29′24″N 99°22′6″W
- Country: United States
- State: Texas
- County: Webb

Area
  - Total: 0.1 sq mi (0.26 km^{2})
  - Land: 0.1 sq mi (0.26 km^{2})
  - Water: 0.0 sq mi (0 km^{2})
- Elevation: 548 ft (167 m)

Population (2020)
  - Total: 220
  - Density: 2,200/sq mi (850/km^{2})
- Time zone: UTC-6 (Central (CST))
  - Summer (DST): UTC-5 (CDT)
- Zip Code: 78043
- GNIS feature ID: 2584732

San Carlos II is a census-designated place (CDP) in Webb County, Texas, United States. This was a new CDP formed from parts of the Laredo Ranchettes CDP prior to the 2010 census. As of the 2020 census, San Carlos II had a population of 220.

It is one of several colonias in Webb County.

== Geography ==
San Carlos II is located at 27°29′24″N 99°22′6″W (27.490038, -99.368387). The CDP has a total area of 0.1 square miles (0.26 km^{2}), all land.

== Demographics ==
Historical population
Census	Pop.	Note	%±
2010	261		—
2020	220		−15.7%
U.S. Decennial Census; 1850–1900 1910; 1920 1930 1940; 1950 1960 1970; 1980 1990 2000; 2010

San Carlos II first appeared as a census designated place in the 2010 U.S. census, one of nine CDPS (La Coma, Laredo Ranchettes West, Los Altos, Ranchitos East, San Carlos I, San Carlos II, Tanquecitos South Acres, Tanquecitos South Acres II, and Pueblo Nuevo) from parts of Laredo Ranchettes CDP.

=== 2020 census ===
San Carlos II CDP, Texas – Racial and ethnic composition Note: the US Census treats Hispanic/Latino as an ethnic category. This table excludes Latinos from the racial categories and assigns them to a separate category. Hispanics/Latinos may be of any race.
Race / Ethnicity (NH = Non-Hispanic)	Pop 2010	Pop 2020	% 2010	% 2020
White alone (NH)	0	6	0.00%	2.73%
Black or African American alone (NH)	1	0	0.38%	0.00%
Native American or Alaska Native alone (NH)	0	0	0.00%	0.00%
Asian alone (NH)	0	0	0.00%	0.00%
Native Hawaiian or Pacific Islander alone (NH)	0	0	0.00%	0.00%
Other race alone (NH)	0	0	0.00%	0.00%
Mixed race or Multiracial (NH)	3	0	1.15%	0.00%
Hispanic or Latino (any race)	257	214	98.47%	97.27%
Total	261	220	100.00%	100.00%

== Education ==
Residents are in the United Independent School District. Zoned schools include: Freedom Elementary School, Raul Perales Middle School, and United South High School.

The designated community college for Webb County is Laredo Community College.
