= Colonians =

Colonians might refer to:

- Colonia (United States)
- Residents of Cologne
