= Lyndon B. Johnson High School (Laredo, Texas) =

Public school in Texas, United States

Coordinates: 27.43151°N 99.46352°W

Location
- 5626 Cielito Lindo Boulevard; Laredo, (Webb County), Texas 78046; United States

Information
- Type: Public high school
- Established: 2001; 25 years ago
- Principal: Gilbert Cardenas
- Staff: 199.91 (FTE)
- Grades: 9-12
- Enrollment: 3,271 (2023-24)
- Student to teacher ratio: 16.36
- Colors: Purple, black, and gold
- Nickname: Wolves
- Website: Lyndon B. Johnson High School

Lyndon B. Johnson High School is a secondary school located in Laredo, Texas, United States. LBJHS is a part of the United Independent School District, and it serves a portion of south Laredo and the neighboring cities of El Cenizo and Rio Bravo, as well as the census-designated place of La Presa. Home of the BLISIA early college and regular early college.

== Background ==
LBJ High School opened in 2001 with its first graduating class in 2005. Its colors are purple, black , and gold.

In 2014, LBJ High School fell short of minimum state standards and have been placed on the Public Education Grant list.

== Mascot ==
The mascot for LBJ High School is a wolf.

== Standardized dress ==
Starting in the 2007–2008 school year, students were required to follow the standardized dress code provided by the district.

Purple is Johnson's designated extra shirt color choice. The Texas Education Agency specified that the parents and/or guardians of students zoned to a school with uniforms may apply for a waiver to opt out of the uniform policy so their children do not have to wear the uniform; parents must specify "bona fide" reasons, such as religious reasons or philosophical objections.

== Feeder schools ==
Feeder elementary schools include:

- Arndt Elementary School
- Juarez-Lincoln Elementary School
- Kennedy-Zapata Elementary School
- Perez Elementary School
- Prada Elementary School
- Roosevelt Elementary School
- United D.D. Hachar Elementary School
- Veterans Memorial Elementary School

Feeder middle schools include:

- Los Obispos Middle School
- Salvador Garcia Middle School
- Lamar Bruni Vergara Middle School
- Ricardo Molina Middle School
