= Pueblo Nuevo, Texas =

- CDP
- Interactive map of Pueblo Nuevo, Texas
- Coordinates: 27°29′38″N 99°18′36″W
- Country: United States
- State: Texas
- County: Webb

Area
  - Total: 0.6 sq mi (1.6 km^{2})
  - Land: 0.6 sq mi (1.6 km^{2})
  - Water: 0.0 sq mi (0 km^{2})
- Elevation: 600 ft (180 m)

Population (2020)
  - Total: 432
  - Density: 720/sq mi (280/km^{2})
- Time zone: UTC-6 (Central (CST))
  - Summer (DST): UTC-5 (CDT)
- Zip Code: 78043
- GNIS feature ID: 2584717

Pueblo Nuevo is a census-designated place (CDP) in Webb County, Texas, United States. As of the 2020 census, Pueblo Nuevo had a population of 432. This was a new CDP formed from parts of the Laredo Ranchettes CDP and additional area prior to the 2010 census.

== Geography ==
Pueblo Nuevo is located at 27°29′38″N 99°18′37″W (27.493908, -99.309882). The CDP has a total area of 0.6 square miles (1.6 km^{2}), all land.

== Demographics ==
Historical population
| Census | Pop. | Note | %± |
|---|---|---|---|
| 2010 | 521 | | — |
| 2020 | 432 | | −17.1% |
U.S. Decennial Census; 1850–1900 1910; 1920 1930 1940; 1950 1960 1970; 1980 1990 2000; 2010

Pueblo Nuevo first appeared as a census designated place in the 2010 U.S. census, one of nine CDPS (La Coma, Laredo Ranchettes West, Los Altos, Ranchitos East, San Carlos I, San Carlos II, Tanquecitos South Acres, Tanquecitos South Acres II, and Pueblo Nuevo) carved out from parts of Laredo Ranchettes CDP.

=== 2020 census ===
Pueblo Nuevo CDP, Texas – Racial and ethnic composition Note: the US Census treats Hispanic/Latino as an ethnic category. This table excludes Latinos from the racial categories and assigns them to a separate category. Hispanics/Latinos may be of any race.
| Race / Ethnicity (NH = Non-Hispanic) | Pop 2010 | Pop 2020 | % 2010 | % 2020 |
|---|---|---|---|---|
| White alone (NH) | 6 | 12 | 1.15% | 2.78% |
| Black or African American alone (NH) | 0 | 1 | 0.00% | 0.23% |
| Native American or Alaska Native alone (NH) | 5 | 0 | 0.96% | 0.00% |
| Asian alone (NH) | 0 | 0 | 0.00% | 0.00% |
| Native Hawaiian or Pacific Islander alone (NH) | 0 | 0 | 0.00% | 0.00% |
| Other race alone (NH) | 0 | 0 | 0.00% | 0.00% |
| Mixed race or Multiracial (NH) | 1 | 0 | 0.19% | 0.00% |
| Hispanic or Latino (any race) | 509 | 419 | 97.70% | 96.99% |
| Total | 521 | 432 | 100.00% | 100.00% |

== Education ==
Residents are in the United Independent School District. Zoned schools include: Freedom Elementary School, Raul Perales Middle School, and United South High School.

The designated community college for Webb County is Laredo Community College.
