= Laredo Ranchettes West, Texas =

- CDP
- Interactive map of Laredo Ranchettes West, Texas
- Coordinates: 27°29′24″N 99°22′13″W
- Country: United States
- State: Texas
- County: Webb

Area
  - Total: 0.1 sq mi (0.26 km^{2})
  - Land: 0.1 sq mi (0.26 km^{2})
  - Water: 0.0 sq mi (0 km^{2})
- Elevation: 545 ft (166 m)

Population (2020)
  - Total: 5
  - Density: 50/sq mi (19/km^{2})
- Time zone: UTC-6 (Central (CST))
  - Summer (DST): UTC-5 (CDT)
- Zip Code: 78043
- GNIS feature ID: 2584668

Laredo Ranchettes West is a census-designated place (CDP) in Webb County, Texas, United States. This was a new CDP formed from parts of the Laredo Ranchettes CDP prior to the 2010 census. As of the 2020 census, Laredo Ranchettes West had a population of 5.

== Geography ==
Laredo Ranchettes West is located at 27°29′24″N 99°22′13″W (27.490034, -99.370145). The CDP has a total area of 0.1 square miles (0.26 km^{2}), all land.

== Demographics ==
Historical population
Census	Pop.	Note	%±
2010	0		—
2020	5		—
U.S. Decennial Census; 1850–1900 1910; 1920 1930 1940; 1950 1960 1970; 1980 1990 2000; 2010 2020

Laredo Ranchettes West first appeared as a census designated place in the 2010 U.S. census, one of nine CDPS (La Coma, Laredo Ranchettes West, Los Altos, Ranchitos East, San Carlos I, San Carlos II, Tanquecitos South Acres, and Tanquecitos South Acres II) from parts of Laredo Ranchettes CDP, and Pueblo Nuevo.

=== 2020 census ===
Laredo Ranchettes West CDP, Texas – Racial and ethnic composition Note: the US Census treats Hispanic/Latino as an ethnic category. This table excludes Latinos from the racial categories and assigns them to a separate category. Hispanics/Latinos may be of any race.
Race / Ethnicity (NH = Non-Hispanic)	Pop 2010	Pop 2020	% 2010	% 2020
White alone (NH)	0	1	0.00%	20.00%
Black or African American alone (NH)	0	0	0.00%	0.00%
Native American or Alaska Native alone (NH)	0	0	0.00%	0.00%
Asian alone (NH)	0	0	0.00%	0.00%
Native Hawaiian or Pacific Islander alone (NH)	0	0	0.00%	0.00%
Other race alone (NH)	0	0	0.00%	0.00%
Mixed race or Multiracial (NH)	0	0	0.00%	0.00%
Hispanic or Latino (any race)	0	4	0.00%	80.00%
Total	0	5	100.00%	100.00%

== Education ==
Residents are in the United Independent School District. Zoned schools include: Freedom Elementary School, Raul Perales Middle School, and United South High School.

The designated community college for Webb County is Laredo Community College.
