= La Presa, Texas =

Census-designated place in Webb County, Texas, United States

- Census-designated place
- Coordinates: 27°23′54″N 99°26′53″W
- Country: United States
- State: Texas
- County: Webb

Area
  - Total: 0.50 sq mi (1.3 km^{2})
  - Land: 0.46 sq mi (1.2 km^{2})
  - Water: 0 sq mi (0.0 km^{2})
- Elevation: 512 ft (156 m)

Population (2020)
  - Total: 241
  - Density: 520/sq mi (200/km^{2})
- Time zone: UTC-6 (Central (CST))
  - Summer (DST): UTC-5 (CDT)
- FIPS code: 48-41449
- GNIS feature ID: 1852720

La Presa is a census-designated place (CDP) in Webb County, Texas, United States. The population was 241 at the 2020 census.

It is one of several colonias in the county.

== Geography ==
La Presa is located at 27°23′54″N 99°26′53″W (27.398305, -99.448106).

According to the United States Census Bureau, the CDP has a total area of 0.5 square mile (1.3 km^{2}), of which 0.5 square miles (1.2 km^{2}) is land and 2.04% is water.

== Demographics ==
Historical population
Census	Pop.	Note	%±
2000	508		—
2010	319		−37.2%
2020	241		−24.5%
U.S. Decennial Census; 1850–1900 1910; 1920 1930 1940; 1950 1960 1970; 1980 1990 2000; 2010 2020

La Presa first appeared as a census designated place in the 2000 U.S. census.

=== 2020 census ===
La Presa CDP, Texas – Racial and ethnic composition Note: the US Census treats Hispanic/Latino as an ethnic category. This table excludes Latinos from the racial categories and assigns them to a separate category. Hispanics/Latinos may be of any race.
Race / Ethnicity (NH = Non-Hispanic)	Pop 2000	Pop 2010	Pop 2020	% 2000	% 2010	% 2020
White alone (NH)	22	2	2	4.33%	0.63%	0.83%
Black or African American alone (NH)	0	0	0	0.00%	0.00%	0.00%
Native American or Alaska Native alone (NH)	0	0	0	0.00%	0.00%	0.00%
Asian alone (NH)	0	0	0	0.00%	0.00%	0.00%
Native Hawaiian or Pacific Islander alone (NH)	0	0	0	0.00%	0.00%	0.00%
Other race alone (NH)	0	0	0	0.00%	0.00%	0.00%
Mixed race or Multiracial (NH)	0	0	0	0.00%	0.00%	0.00%
Hispanic or Latino (any race)	486	317	239	95.67%	99.37%	99.17%
Total	508	319	241	100.00%	100.00%	100.00%

As of the census of 2010, there were 319 people, 128 households, and 104 families residing in the CDP. The population density was 1,059.5 inhabitants per square mile (409.1/km^{2}). There were 178 housing units at an average density of 371.2 per square mile (143.3/km^{2}). The racial makeup of the CDP was 86.42% White, 0.59% African American, 10.63% from other races, and 2.36% from two or more races. Hispanic or Latino of any race were 95.67% of the population.

There were 128 households, out of which 55.5% had children under the age of 18 living with them, 66.4% were married couples living together, 7.8% had a female householder with no husband present, and 18.8% were non-families. 10.2% of all households were made up of individuals, and 2.3% had someone living alone who was 65 years of age or older. The average household size was 3.97 and the average family size was 4.25.

In the CDP, the population was spread out, with 34.1% under the age of 18, 9.4% from 18 to 24, 33.9% from 25 to 44, 17.5% from 45 to 64, and 5.1% who were 65 years of age or older. The median age was 28 years. For every 100 females, there were 130.9 males. For every 100 females age 18 and over, there were 157.7 males.

The median income for a household in the CDP was $19,861, and the median income for a family was $16,467. Males had a median income of $16,970 versus $12,500 for females. The per capita income for the CDP was $9,665. About 42.4% of families and 37.1% of the population were below the poverty line, including 44.8% of those under age 18 and 100.0% of those age 65 or over.

== Education ==
La Presa is served by the United Independent School District. Its zoned schools are Veterans Memorial Elementary School, Lamar Bruni Vergara Middle School, and Lyndon B. Johnson High School (Laredo).

The designated community college for Webb County is Laredo Community College.

== See also ==
- List of census-designated places in Texas
