= Pueblo East, Texas =

- Unincorporated community Census-designated place
- Interactive map of Pueblo East, Texas
- Coordinates: 27°40′29″N 99°11′23″W
- Country: United States
- State: Texas
- County: Webb

Area
  - Total: 0.1 sq mi (0.26 km^{2})
  - Land: 0.1 sq mi (0.26 km^{2})
  - Water: 0.0 sq mi (0 km^{2})
- Elevation: 568 ft (173 m)

Population (2020)
  - Total: 1
  - Density: 10/sq mi (3.9/km^{2})
- Time zone: UTC-6 (Central (CST))
  - Summer (DST): UTC-5 (CDT)
- Zip Code: 78044
- GNIS feature ID: 2584716

Pueblo East is an unincorporated community and census-designated place (CDP) in Webb County, Texas, United States. It was a new CDP formed from parts of the Ranchitos Las Lomas CDP prior to the 2010 census. As of the 2020 census, Pueblo East had a population of 1.

== Geography ==
Pueblo East is located at 27°40′29″N 99°11′23″W (27.674829, -99.189648). The CDP has a total area of 0.1 square miles (0.26 km^{2}), all land.

== Education ==
Residents are in the United Independent School District. Zoned schools include: Dr. Henry Cuellar Elementary School, Antonio Gonzalez Middle School, and United South High School.

The designated community college for Webb County is Laredo Community College.

== Demographics ==
Historical population
| Census | Pop. | Note | %± |
|---|---|---|---|
| 2010 | 0 | | — |
| 2020 | 1 | | — |
U.S. Decennial Census; 1850–1900 1910; 1920 1930 1940; 1950 1960 1970; 1980 1990 2000; 2010 2020

Pueblo East first appeared as a census-designated place in the 2010 U.S. census, one of seven CDPs (Colorado Acres, Hillside Acres, Las Haciendas, Las Pilas, Los Veteranos I, Pueblo East, and Valle Verde) were formed out the Ranchitos Las Lomas CDP.

=== 2020 census ===
Pueblo East CDP, Texas – Racial and ethnic composition Note: the US Census treats Hispanic/Latino as an ethnic category. This table excludes Latinos from the racial categories and assigns them to a separate category. Hispanics/Latinos may be of any race.
| Race / Ethnicity (NH = Non-Hispanic) | Pop 2010 | Pop 2020 | % 2010 | % 2020 |
|---|---|---|---|---|
| White alone (NH) | 0 | 1 | 0.00% | 100.00% |
| Black or African American alone (NH) | 0 | 0 | 0.00% | 0.00% |
| Native American or Alaska Native alone (NH) | 0 | 0 | 0.00% | 0.00% |
| Asian alone (NH) | 0 | 0 | 0.00% | 0.00% |
| Native Hawaiian or Pacific Islander alone (NH) | 0 | 0 | 0.00% | 0.00% |
| Other race alone (NH) | 0 | 0 | 0.00% | 0.00% |
| Mixed race or Multiracial (NH) | 0 | 0 | 0.00% | 0.00% |
| Hispanic or Latino (any race) | 0 | 0 | 0.00% | 0.00% |
| Total | 0 | 1 | 100.00% | 100.00% |
