= Ranchitos Las Lomas, Texas =

- Census-designated place
- Interactive map of Ranchitos Las Lomas, Texas
- Coordinates: 27°37′42″N 99°14′4″W
- Country: United States
- State: Texas
- County: Webb

Area
  - Total: 3.6 sq mi (9.3 km^{2})
  - Land: 3.6 sq mi (9.3 km^{2})
  - Water: 0.0 sq mi (0 km^{2})
- Elevation: 607 ft (185 m)

Population (2020)
  - Total: 167
  - Density: 46/sq mi (18/km^{2})
- Time zone: UTC-6 (Central (CST))
  - Summer (DST): UTC-5 (CDT)
- Zip Code: 78044
- FIPS code: 48-60482
- GNIS feature ID: 2409131

Ranchitos Las Lomas is a census-designated place (CDP) in Webb County, Texas, United States. The population was 167 at the 2020 census. Las Lomas means "the hills" in Spanish.

== History ==
The town prides itself as "the place where nothing ever happened."

== Geography ==
Ranchitos Las Lomas is located at 27°37′42″N 99°14′4″W (27.628277, -99.234505).

According to the United States Census Bureau in 2000, the CDP has a total area of 21.9 square miles (56.8 km^{2}), of which 21.8 square miles (56.6 km^{2}) is land and 0.1 square mile (0.2 km^{2}; 0.37%) is water. This CDP lost area in the changes in Webb County prior to the 2010 census. Its total area was reduced to 3.6 square miles (9.3 km^{2}), as before, all land.

== Demographics ==
Historical population
Census	Pop.	Note	%±
2000	334		—
2010	266		−20.4%
2020	167		−37.2%
U.S. Decennial Census; 1850–1900 1910; 1920 1930 1940; 1950 1960 1970; 1980 1990 2000; 2010

Ranchitos Las Lomas first appeared as a census-designated place in the 2000 U.S. census. Prior to the 2010 U.S. census, seven CDPs (Colorado Acres, Hillside Acres, Las Haciendas, Las Pilas, Los Veteranos I, Pueblo East, and Valle Verde) were formed out of its territory.

=== 2020 census ===
Ranchitos Las Lomas CDP, Texas – Racial and ethnic composition Note: the US Census treats Hispanic/Latino as an ethnic category. This table excludes Latinos from the racial categories and assigns them to a separate category. Hispanics/Latinos may be of any race.
Race / Ethnicity (NH = Non-Hispanic)	Pop 2000	Pop 2010	Pop 2020	% 2000	% 2010	% 2020
White alone (NH)	4	6	12	1.20%	2.26%	7.19%
Black or African American alone (NH)	0	0	0	0.00%	0.00%	0.00%
Native American or Alaska Native alone (NH)	0	0	2	0.00%	0.00%	1.20%
Asian alone (NH)	0	0	0	0.00%	0.00%	0.00%
Native Hawaiian or Pacific Islander alone (NH)	0	0	0	0.00%	0.00%	0.00%
Other race alone (NH)	0	0	0	0.00%	0.00%	0.00%
Mixed race or Multiracial (NH)	1	1	0	0.30%	0.38%	0.00%
Hispanic or Latino (any race)	329	259	153	98.50%	97.37%	91.62%
Total	334	266	167	100.00%	100.00%	100.00%

As of the census of 2000, there were 334 people, 89 households, and 70 families residing in the CDP. The population density was 15.3 people per square mile (5.9/km^{2}). There were 148 housing units at an average density of 6.8/sq mi (2.6/km^{2}). The racial makeup of the CDP was 72.75% White, 0.90% Native American, 19.46% from other races, and 6.89% from two or more races. Hispanic or Latino people of any race were 98.50% of the population.

There were 89 households, out of which 56.2% had children under the age of 18 living with them, 55.1% were married couples living together, 18.0% had a female householder with no husband present, and 21.3% were non-families. 16.9% of all households were made up of individuals, and 3.4% had someone living alone who was 65 years of age or older. The average household size was 3.75 and the average family size was 4.34.

In the CDP, the population was spread out, with 42.5% under the age of 18, 12.3% from 18 to 24, 27.2% from 25 to 44, 13.5% from 45 to 64, and 4.5% who were 65 years of age or older. The median age was 22 years. For every 100 females, there were 108.8 males. For every 100 females age 18 and over, there were 102.1 males.

The median income for a household in the CDP was $25,417, and the median income for a family was $22,917. Males had a median income of $17,250 versus $17,500 for females. The per capita income for the CDP was $8,630. About 43.8% of families and 35.0% of the population were below the poverty line, including 35.3% of those under age 18 and 26.1% of those age 65 or over.

== Education ==
The community is served by the United Independent School District. Zoned schools include: Dr. Henry Cuellar Elementary School, Antonio Gonzalez Middle School, and United South High School.

The designated community college for Webb County is Laredo Community College.
