= United South High School =

Location
- 4001 Ave. Los Presidentes; Laredo, TX 78046; 27.47736°N 99.45019°W

Information
- Type: Public
- Motto: Panther Pride
- Established: 1990
- School district: United Independent School District
- NCES District ID: 4843650.
- CEEB code: 444059
- NCES School ID: 484365006922.
- Principal: Martha Imelda Alvarez Assistant principal= Chris Sandoval
- Grades: 9–12
- Enrollment: 3,243 (2022-23)
- Colors: Carolina blue, silver, and black
- Mascot: Panthers
- Website: ushs.uisd.net

United South High School is a high school located in the southern portion of Laredo, Texas, United States. It is a part of the United Independent School District. It consists of over 40 school organizations, and mostly serves students with Hispanic ethnicity.

There is a no-bullying tolerance in the school, and the UISD dress code is strictly enforced.

Along with offering various academic courses (G/T & AP), United South is also a college prep school, and offers education in vocational programs (Construction Technology, Auto Body, Future Farmers of America, and Welding). It is also known for its Academy of Global Business and Advanced Technology.

Alumni activities include the Men's and Women's Youth Conferences, Career Day, and the inviting of special guest speakers.

== The Academy ==
United South High School houses the Academy of Global Business and Advanced Technology, a magnet school focused on business and technology education. This academy is a small section within the school. To join it, students take a timed entrance exam. They can choose technology or business. Business classes include Accounting I and Entrepreneurship (sophomores), Securities and Investments and Business Law (juniors), and Distribution and Logistics (seniors). Technology classes include A+ Certification (sophomores), Internetworking I (juniors), and Internetworking II (seniors). Magnet students are required to graduate on the distinguished plan and must have at least 250 community service hours, 4 measures, and 32 high school credits in order to do so.

== Attendance boundary ==
Communities within the United South High boundary include portions of Laredo and the following census-designated places:

- Colorado Acres
- Hillside Acres
- La Coma
- Laredo Ranchettes
- Laredo Ranchettes West
- Las Haciendas
- Las Pilas
- Los Altos
- Los Arcos
- Los Centenarios
- Los Fresnos
- Los Nopalitos
- Los Veteranos I
- Pueblo East
- Pueblo Nuevo
- Ranchitos East
- Ranchitos Las Lomas
- San Carlos I
- San Carlos II
- Tanquecitos South Acres
- Tanquecitos South Acres II
- Valle Verde

== Notable alumni ==
- Marco Raya, MLB pitcher
