= Los Arcos, Texas =

- CDP
- Interactive map of Los Arcos, Texas
- Coordinates: 27°36′52″N 99°12′38″W
- Country: United States
- State: Texas
- County: Webb

Area
  - Total: 0.2 sq mi (0.52 km^{2})
  - Land: 0.2 sq mi (0.52 km^{2})
  - Water: 0.0 sq mi (0 km^{2})
- Elevation: 610 ft (190 m)

Population (2020)
  - Total: 83
  - Density: 410/sq mi (160/km^{2})
- Time zone: UTC-6 (Central (CST))
  - Summer (DST): UTC-5 (CDT)
- Zip Code: 78043
- GNIS feature ID: 2584678

Los Arcos is a census-designated place (CDP) in Webb County, Texas, United States. This was a new CDP for the 2010 census. As of the 2020 census, Los Arcos had a population of 83.

== Geography ==
Los Arcos is located at 27°36′52″N 99°12′38″W (27.614419, -99.210488). The CDP has a total area of 0.2 square miles (0.52 km^{2}), all land.

== Demographics ==
Historical population
Census	Pop.	Note	%±
2010	127		—
2020	83		−34.6%
U.S. Decennial Census; 1850–1900 1910; 1920 1930 1940; 1950 1960 1970; 1980 1990 2000; 2010 2020

Los Arcos first appeared as a census designated place in the 2010 U.S. census.

=== 2020 census ===
Los Arcos CDP, Texas – Racial and ethnic composition Note: the US Census treats Hispanic/Latino as an ethnic category. This table excludes Latinos from the racial categories and assigns them to a separate category. Hispanics/Latinos may be of any race.
Race / Ethnicity (NH = Non-Hispanic)	Pop 2010	Pop 2020	% 2010	% 2020
White alone (NH)	0	0	0.00%	0.00%
Black or African American alone (NH)	0	0	0.00%	0.00%
Native American or Alaska Native alone (NH)	0	0	0.00%	0.00%
Asian alone (NH)	0	0	0.00%	0.00%
Native Hawaiian or Pacific Islander alone (NH)	0	0	0.00%	0.00%
Other race alone (NH)	0	0	0.00%	0.00%
Mixed race or Multiracial (NH)	0	1	0.00%	1.20%
Hispanic or Latino (any race)	127	82	100.00%	98.80%
Total	127	83	100.00%	100.00%

== Education ==
Residents are in the United Independent School District. Zoned schools include: Dr. Henry Cuellar Elementary School, Antonio Gonzalez Middle School, United South High School.

The designated community college for Webb County is Laredo Community College.
