= Step Academy =

STEP Academy

Location
- 1600 Espejo Molina Road; Laredo, Texas 78046; United States; 27.362001°N 99.480279°W

Information
- Type: Public
- School district: United Independent School District
- Mascot: Navigators
- Website: step.uisd.net

Step Academy is a discipline alternative school for at-risk students in United Independent School District. Located in Laredo, Texas, United States.

It is in the former Juarez-Lincoln Elementary School.
