= Laredo Ranchettes, Texas =

- CDP
- Interactive map of Laredo Ranchettes, Texas
- Coordinates: 27°29′28″N 99°21′36″W
- Country: United States
- State: Texas
- County: Webb

Area
  - Total: 0.6 sq mi (1.6 km^{2})
  - Land: 0.6 sq mi (1.6 km^{2})
  - Water: 0.0 sq mi (0 km^{2})
- Elevation: 591 ft (180 m)

Population (2020)
  - Total: 21
  - Density: 35/sq mi (14/km^{2})
- Time zone: UTC-6 (Central (CST))
  - Summer (DST): UTC-5 (CDT)
- Zip Code: 78043
- FIPS code: 48-41473
- GNIS feature ID: 2408573

Laredo Ranchettes is a census-designated place (CDP) in Webb County, Texas, United States. As of the 2020 census, Laredo Ranchettes had a population of 21.

== Geography ==
Laredo Ranchettes is located at 27°29′28″N 99°21′36″W (27.491169, -99.359960).

According to the United States Census Bureau in 2000, the CDP has a total area of 24.2 square miles (62.7 km^{2}), of which 24.1 square miles (62.4 km^{2}) is land and 0.1 square mile (0.3 km^{2}) (0.45%) is water. This CDP lost area in the changes in Webb County prior to the 2010 census. Its total area was reduced to 0.6 square miles (1.6 km^{2}), as before, all land.

== Demographics ==
Historical population
Census	Pop.	Note	%±
2000	1,845		—
2010	22		−98.8%
2020	21		−4.5%
U.S. Decennial Census; 1850–1900 1910; 1920 1930 1940; 1950 1960 1970; 1980 1990 2000; 2010 2020

Laredo Ranchette was first listed as a census designated place in the 2000 U.S. census. Prior to the 2010 U.S. census, nine CDPS (La Coma, Laredo Ranchettes West, Los Altos, Ranchitos East, San Carlos I, San Carlos II, Tanquecitos South Acres II, Tanquecitos South Acres, and Pueblo Nuevo) were carved out from its territory substantially reducing its population.

=== 2020 census ===
Laredo Ranchettes CDP, Texas – Racial and ethnic composition Note: the US Census treats Hispanic/Latino as an ethnic category. This table excludes Latinos from the racial categories and assigns them to a separate category. Hispanics/Latinos may be of any race.
Race / Ethnicity (NH = Non-Hispanic)	Pop 2000	Pop 2010	Pop 2020	% 2000	% 2010	% 2020
White alone (NH)	51	0	0	2.76%	0.00%	0.00%
Black or African American alone (NH)	8	0	0	0.43%	0.00%	0.00%
Native American or Alaska Native alone (NH)	3	0	0	0.16%	0.00%	0.00%
Asian alone (NH)	0	0	0	0.00%	0.00%	0.00%
Native Hawaiian or Pacific Islander alone (NH)	0	0	0	0.00%	0.00%	0.00%
Other race alone (NH)	0	0	0	0.00%	0.00%	0.00%
Mixed race or Multiracial (NH)	5	0	0	0.27%	0.00%	0.00%
Hispanic or Latino (any race)	1,778	22	21	96.37%	100.00%	100.00%
Total	1,845	22	21	100.00%	100.00%	100.00%

As of the census of 2010 there were 22 people, in the census of 2000 there were 1,845 people, 463 households, and 405 families residing in the CDP. The population density was 76.6 inhabitants per square mile (29.6/km^{2}). There were 611 housing units at an average density of 25.4/sq mi (9.8/km^{2}). The racial makeup of the CDP was 84.66% White, 0.54% African American, 0.60% Native American, 10.51% from other races, and 3.69% from two or more races. Hispanic or Latino people of any race were 96.37% of the population.

There were 463 households, out of which 60.7% had children under the age of 18 living with them, 69.1% were married couples living together, 11.9% had a female householder with no husband present, and 12.5% were non-families. 10.8% of all households were made up of individuals, and 5.2% had someone living alone who was 65 years of age or older. The average household size was 3.98 and the average family size was 4.34.

In the CDP, the population was spread out, with 42.4% under the age of 18, 12.5% from 18 to 24, 25.4% from 25 to 44, 14.0% from 45 to 64, and 5.7% who were 65 years of age or older. The median age was 22 years. For every 100 females, there were 107.5 males. For every 100 females age 18 and over, there were 101.7 males.

The median income for a household in the CDP was $18,029, and the median income for a family was $19,087. Males had a median income of $18,571 versus $14,219 for females. The per capita income for the CDP was $13,194. About 44.6% of families and 47.6% of the population were below the poverty line, including 48.9% of those under age 18 and 24.6% of those age 65 or over.

== Education ==
Residents are in the United Independent School District. Zoned schools include: Freedom Elementary School, Raul Perales Middle School, and United South High School.

The designated community college for Webb County is Laredo Community College.
