= Ranchos Penitas West, Texas =

- CDP
- Coordinates: 27°40′24″N 99°36′20″W
- Country: United States
- State: Texas
- County: Webb

Area
  - Total: 2.1 sq mi (5.4 km^{2})
  - Land: 2.1 sq mi (5.4 km^{2})
  - Water: 0 sq mi (0.0 km^{2})
- Elevation: 499 ft (152 m)

Population (2020)
  - Total: 466
  - Density: 220/sq mi (86/km^{2})
- Time zone: UTC-6 (Central (CST))
  - Summer (DST): UTC-5 (CDT)
- Zip Code: 78045
- FIPS code: 48-60539
- GNIS feature ID: 2409141

Ranchos Penitas West is a census-designated place (CDP) in Webb County, Texas, United States. The population was 466 at the 2020 census.

== Geography ==
Ranchos Penitas (Cesar Cardenas) West is located at 27°40′24″N 99°36′20″W (27.673466, -99.605590).

According to the United States Census Bureau in 2000, the CDP has a total area of 4.7 square miles (12.0 km^{2}), all land. This CDP lost area in the changes in Webb County prior to the 2010 census. Its total area was reduced to 2.1 square miles (5.4 km^{2}), as before, all land.

== Demographics ==
Historical population
Census	Pop.	Note	%±
2000	520		—
2010	573		10.2%
2020	466		−18.7%
U.S. Decennial Census; 1850–1900 1910; 1920 1930 1940; 1950 1960 1970; 1980 1990 2000; 2010

Ranchos Penitas West first appeared as a census designated place in the 2000 U.S. census. Prior to the 2010 U.S. census, the Los Minerales CDP was carved out from its territory.

=== 2020 census ===
Ranchos Penitas West CDP, Texas – Racial and ethnic composition Note: the US Census treats Hispanic/Latino as an ethnic category. This table excludes Latinos from the racial categories and assigns them to a separate category. Hispanics/Latinos may be of any race.
Race / Ethnicity (NH = Non-Hispanic)	Pop 2000	Pop 2010	Pop 2020	% 2000	% 2010	% 2020
White alone (NH)	24	5	21	4.62%	0.87%	4.51%
Black or African American alone (NH)	4	2	0	0.77%	0.35%	0.00%
Native American or Alaska Native alone (NH)	2	0	0	0.38%	0.00%	0.00%
Asian alone (NH)	0	0	0	0.00%	0.00%	0.00%
Native Hawaiian or Pacific Islander alone (NH)	0	0	0	0.00%	0.00%	0.00%
Other race alone (NH)	0	3	0	0.00%	0.52%	0.00%
Mixed race or Multiracial (NH)	0	1	0	0.00%	0.17%	0.00%
Hispanic or Latino (any race)	490	562	445	94.23%	98.08%	95.49%
Total	520	573	466	100.00%	100.00%	100.00%

As of the census of 2000, there were 520 people, 114 households, and 104 families residing in the CDP. The population density was 111.7 inhabitants per square mile (43.1/km^{2}). There were 152 housing units at an average density of 32.7 per square mile (12.6/km^{2}). The racial makeup of the CDP was 88.85% White, 0.77% African American, 0.38% Native American, 9.81% from other races, and 0.19% from two or more races. Hispanic or Latino peopleof any race were 94.23% of the population.

There were 114 households, out of which 66.7% had children under the age of 18 living with them, 78.1% were married couples living together, 9.6% had a female householder with no husband present, and 7.9% were non-families. 6.1% of all households were made up of individuals, and 2.6% had someone living alone who was 65 years of age or older. The average household size was 4.56 and the average family size was 4.71.

In the CDP, the population was spread out, with 44.2% under the age of 18, 8.3% from 18 to 24, 28.8% from 25 to 44, 12.9% from 45 to 64, and 5.8% who were 65 years of age or older. The median age was 23 years. For every 100 females, there were 107.2 males. For every 100 females age 18 and over, there were 104.2 males.

The median income for a household in the CDP was $23,681, and the median income for a family was $24,097. Males had a median income of $22,955 versus $14,107 for females. The per capita income for the CDP was $6,236. About 25.3% of families and 30.2% of the population were below the poverty line, including 29.6% of those under age 18 and 52.2% of those age 65 or over.

== Education ==
The community is served by the United Independent School District. Zoned schools include: Julia Bird Jones Muller Elementary School, George Washington Middle School, United High School.

The designated community college for Webb County is Laredo Community College.
