= Land contract =

Contract for the purchase of real property with structured loan repayments

In contract law, a land contract, (also known as contract for deed or agreement for deed), is a contract between the buyer and seller of real property in which the seller provides the buyer financing in the purchase, and the buyer repays the resulting loan in installments. Under a land contract, the seller retains the legal title to the property but permits the buyer to take possession of it for most purposes other than that of legal ownership. The sale price is typically paid in periodic installments, often with a balloon payment at the end to make the timelength of payments shorter than in the corresponding fully amortized loan (a loan without a final balloon payment). When the full purchase price has been paid including any interest, the seller is obligated to convey (to the buyer) legal title to the property. An initial down payment from the buyer to the seller is usually also required.

The legal status of land contracts varies between jurisdictions.

Since a land contract specifies the sale of a specific item of real estate between a seller and buyer, a land contract can be considered a special type of real estate contract. In the usual more conventional real estate contracts, a seller does not provide a loan to the buyer; the contract either does not specify a loan or includes provisions for a loan from a different "third-party" lender, usually a financial institution in practice. When third party lenders are involved, typically a lien, as part of a mortgage or trust deed, is placed on the property, in which the property serves as collateral until the loan is repaid.

== Installment payments ==
It is common for the installment payments of the purchase price to be similar to mortgage payments in amount and effect. The amount is often determined according to a mortgage amortization schedule. In effect, each installment payment is partial payment of the purchase price and partial payment of interest on the unpaid purchase price, similar to mortgage payments which are part repayment of the principal amount of the mortgage loan and part interest. As the buyer pays more toward the principal of the loan over time, their equity (equitable title or equitable interest) in the property increases. For example, if a buyer pays a $2,000 down payment and borrows $8,000 for a $10,000 parcel of land, and pays off in installments another $4,000 of this loan (not including interest), the buyer has $6,000 of equity in the land (which is 60% of the equitable title), but the seller holds legal title to the land as recorded in documentation (deeds) in a government recorder's office until the loan is completely paid off. However, if the buyer defaults on installment payments, the land contract may consider the failure to timely pay installments a breach of contract, and the land equity may revert to the seller, depending on the land contract's provisions.

Since land contracts can easily be written or modified by any seller or buyer; one may come across any variety of repayment plans: interest only, negative amortizations, short balloons, extremely long amortizations just to name a few. It is not uncommon for land contracts to go unrecorded. For several reasons, the buyer or seller may decide that the contract is not to be recorded in the register of deeds. That does not make the contract invalid, but it does increase exposure to undesirable side effects. Some states, such as Minnesota, issue contracts without an acceleration clause, which, in the case of a default leaves the seller in a position to cancel the contract, discharging any principal deficiency, as in the case of deprecation, or to litigate for 18 months or more while the buyer, if not a corporation, is allowed to retain its rights to the property while collection attempts are made, when the buyer will often qualify for bankruptcy, making the contract, when it lacks said acceleration clause, effectively an installment option, when the buyer has no other lienable assets. In bankruptcy, some regions will interpret it as an executory contract that can be rejected, while others will treat it as a debt to be paid out of the bankruptcy trust. That and a wide variety of other legal ambiguities has led to a trend toward eliminating the use of land contracts to remove any incentives, and as a result, the disadvantages that those contracts have compared to the standard note and mortgage, which are more clearly defined in, and regulated by, law.

== Reasons for use ==
Although most land contracts can be used for a variety of reasons, their most common use is as a form of short-term seller financing. Usually, but not always, the date on which the full amount of the purchase price is due will be years sooner than when the purchase price would be paid in full according to the amortization schedule. That results in the final payment being a large balloon payment. Since the amount of the final payment is so large, the buyer may obtain a conventional mortgage loan from a bank to make the final payment. Land contracts are sometimes used by buyers who do not qualify for conventional mortgage loans offered by a traditional lending institution for reasons of unestablished or poor credit or an insufficient down payment. Land contracts are also used when the seller is eager to sell and the buyer is not given enough time to arrange for conventional financing.

There can be other advantages of using a land contract too. When a third-party lender, such as a financial institution, provides a loan, this third party has its own interests to protect against the other two parties involved, the seller and buyer. Establishing the correct title and value of the property to be used as collateral is important to the lender. Thus, the lender commonly requires title service including title search and title insurance by an independent title company, appraisal and termite inspection of the property to ensure it has sufficient value, a land survey to ensure there are no encroachments, and use of lawyers to ensure the closing is done correctly. The third-party lender requirements add to closing costs, which the lender requires the seller and/or buyer to pay. If the seller is also the lender, the costs are usually not required by the seller and may result in closing cost savings and fewer complications. It may also be the seller's position that if the buyer requires any of those services, he could pay for the costs and make arrangements himself. For properties in which only relatively undeveloped land is involved and if the seller is willing to finance, the price of the empty land may be so low that the conventional closing costs are not worthwhile and can be an impediment to a quick and simple sale. Easy financing and a simple sale transaction may be a good selling point for a seller to offer a buyer.

A land contract is a unilateral contract and cannot be assigned to another buyer without the consent of the seller providing the financing.

== Consumer-protection concerns ==
Because of growing concerns that sales via land contract might violate truth in lending laws, the Consumer Financial Protection Bureau (CFPB) is considering regulating these real estate sales. In 2015, Texas law was changed to automatically place the legal title to the property with the buyer by filing the contract with the deed records office of the county where the property is located. While the seller loses title, the seller retains a vendor's lien in the property for the outstanding balance of the contract.

Historically, contract-for-deed arrangements were popular in mid-20th-century Chicago, and buyers, frequently black families shunned from government-insured mortgage loans, who bought real estate under such arrangements often found it difficult to build home equity.
