= United Independent School District =

School district in Texas, United States

Location
- 201 Lindenwood Dr; Laredo, Texas United States
- Coordinates: 27.574168°N 99.480182°W

District information
- Type: Public
- Grades: PK-12
- Established: 1961
- Superintendent: David H. Gonzalez
- Schools: 42
- Budget: $367,034,000
- NCES District ID: 4843650

Students and staff
- Students: 40,885 as of 2010
- Teachers: 2,538.01 (on an FTE basis)
- Student–teacher ratio: 16.11

Other information
- Website: www.uisd.net

United Independent School District is a school district headquartered in Laredo, Texas.

== History ==
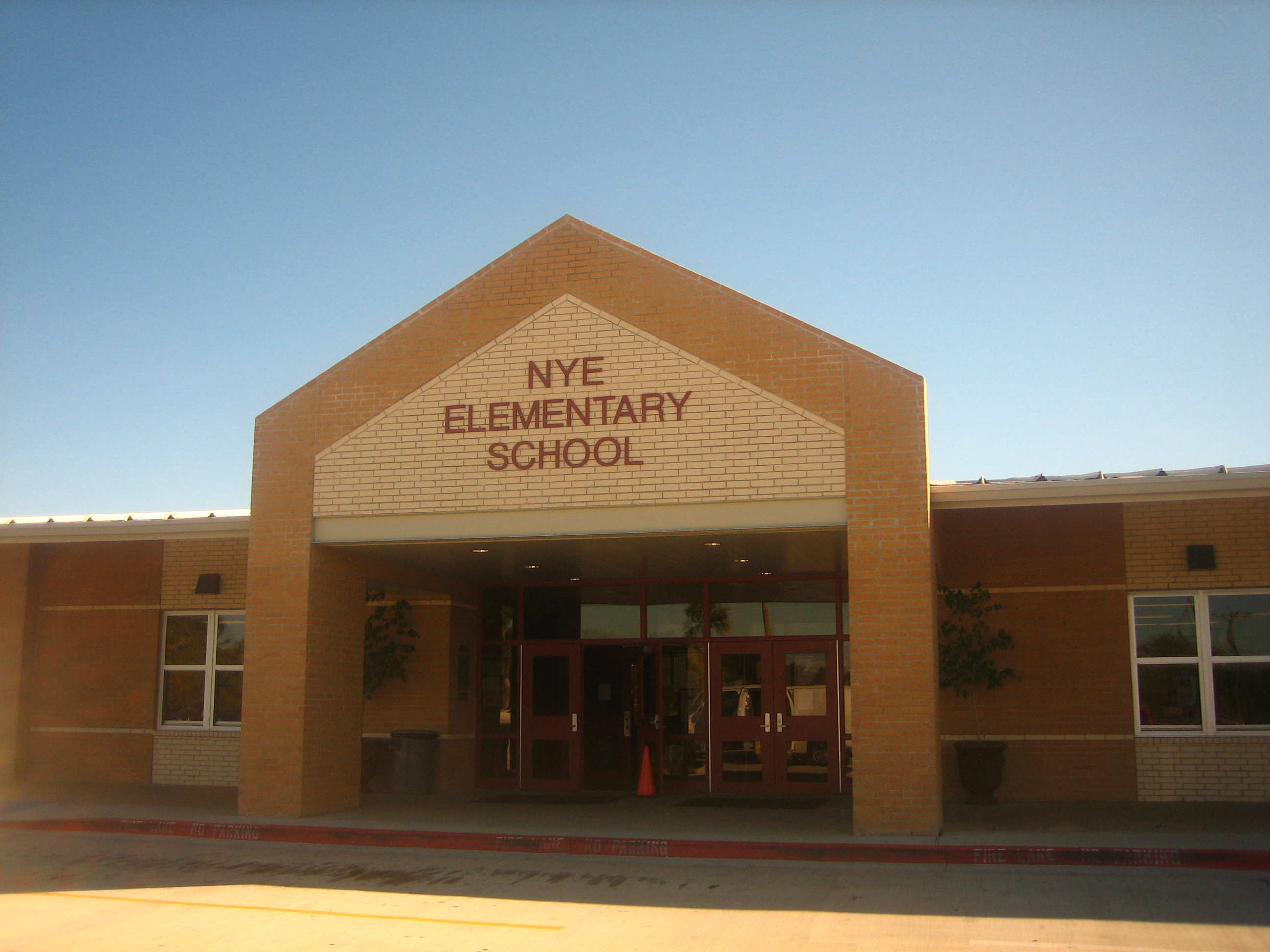
The renovated Nye Elementary School on Del Mar Boulevard in Laredo

The district was created in 1961 via the consolidation of the former Cactus, Johnson, and Nye school districts. The "Big Three" involved in the establishment of UISD were rancher Joe B. Finley, Amparo Gutierrez, and John W. Arndt, all of whom have schools named in their honor.

By the 2000s, United ISD had a rapidly growing student population due to the burgeoning populations of many colonias along the Texas-Mexico border. As of the 2000s, United ISD gains about 1,500 students per year.

On November 5, 2013, voters handily approved a $408.7 million school bond issue to acquire land, construct new schools, and expand other facilities. The tabulation in a low-turnout election was 5,148 (66.1 percent) in support and 2,643 (33.9 percent) in opposition.

In 2009, the school district was rated "academically acceptable" under the accountability ratings system used by the Texas Education Agency.

== Service area ==
UISD serves portions of the city of Laredo, the cities of El Cenizo and Rio Bravo, and several unincorporated areas in Webb County. The census-designated places include:

- Bonanza Hills
- Botines
- Colorado Acres
- Four Points
- Hillside Acres
- La Coma
- La Moca Ranch
- La Presa
- Las Haciendas
- Las Pilas
- Laredo Ranchettes
- Laredo Ranchettes West
- Los Altos
- Los Arcos
- Los Centenarios
- Los Corralitos
- Los Fresnos
- Los Huisaches
- Los Minerales
- Los Nopalitos
- Los Veteranos I
- Los Veteranos II
- Pueblo East
- Pueblo Nuevo
- Ranchitos East
- Ranchitos Las Lomas
- Ranchos Penitas West
- San Carlos
- San Carlos II
- Sunset Acres
- Tanquecitos South Acres
- Tanquecitos South Acres II
- Valle Verde

It also serves Larga Vista, now a part of Laredo.

United ISD's land area exceeds that of Delaware.

== Standardized dress ==
Students in pre-Kindergarten through 8th grades are required to follow standardized dress code provided by the district; the dress code began during the 2006-2007 school year. Since the 2007-2008 school year, high school students are also required to follow the same standardized dress code procedures as approved by the Board of Trustees.

The Texas Education Agency specified that the parents and/or guardians of students zoned to a school with uniforms may apply for a waiver to opt out of the uniform policy so their children do not have to wear the uniform; parents must specify "bona fide" reasons, such as religious reasons or philosophical objections.

Shortly before the 2021-2022 school year, the Board of Trustees passed a "casual dress code". However, some restrictions still apply.

As of the year 2026, the UISD Board of Trustees has approved revisions to the Student Dress Code for elementary, middle, and high school students for the 2026–2027 school year, which added more diversion between options, but restrictions still apply.

== Schools ==
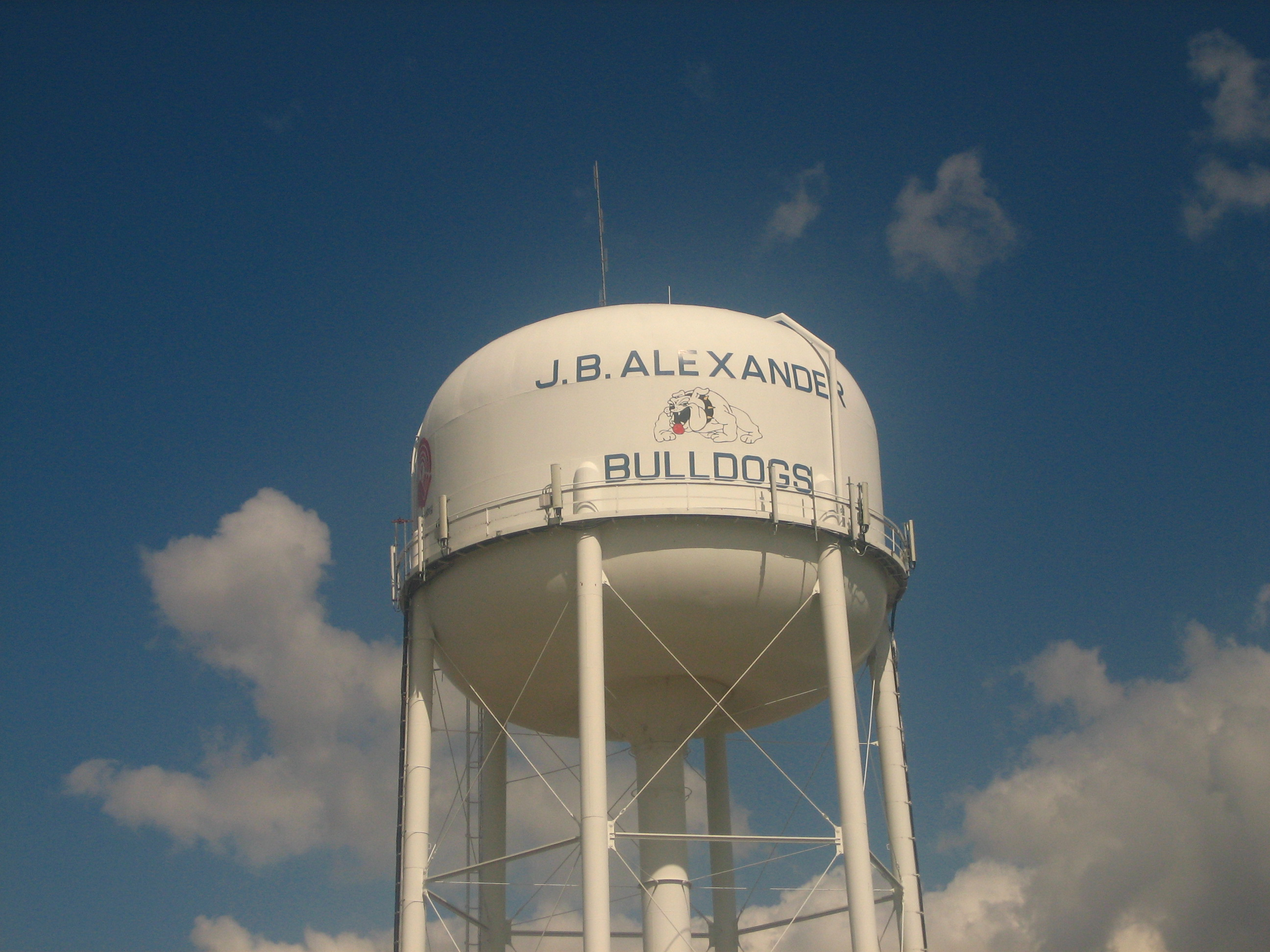
Water tower advertises J.B. Alexander Bulldogs in Laredo.

=== High schools ===
- John B. Alexander High School (1994)
- Lyndon B. Johnson High School (2001)
- United High School (1963)
- United South High School (1990)
- Step Academy

=== Middle schools ===
- Antonio Gonzalez Middle School (2002)
- Clark Middle School (1978)
- George Washington Middle School (1995)
- Lamar Bruni Vergara Middle School (2006)
- Los Obispos Middle School (1996)
- Raul Perales Middle School (2018)
- Ricardo Molina Middle School (2022)
- Salvador Garcia Middle School (1995)
- Trautmann Middle School (1996)
- United Middle School (1984)
- United South Middle School (1990)
- Elias Herrera Middle School (2020)
- Roberto Ramirez Middle School (2024)

== Elementary schools ==
- John W. Arndt Elementary School (1991)
- Colonel Santos Benavides Elementary School (2005)
- Freedom Elementary School (2002)
- Charles R. Borchers Elementary School, named for the former district attorney of the 49th Judicial District Court and former UISD board president Charles Robert Borchers of Laredo (2004)
- Centeno Elementary School (2008)
- Clark Elementary School (1973)
- Henry Cuellar Elementary School (1999)
- Barbara Fasken Elementary School (2006)
- Finley Elementary School (1982)
  National Blue Ribbon School 1998-99
- Bonnie L. Garcia Elementary School (1981)
- Juarez-Lincoln Elementary School (1972)
- Kazen Elementary School (2002)
- John F. Kennedy-Emiliano Zapata Elementary School (1966)
- Killam Elementary School (1997)
- Malakoff Elementary School (2005)
- Julia Bird Jones Muller Elementary School (1999)
- Newman Elementary School (1974)
- Nye Elementary School (1983)
- Perez Elementary School (1997)
- Prada Elementary School (1996)
- Roosevelt Elementary School (2010)
- Ruiz Elementary School (1992)
- Salinas Elementary School (1965)
- San Isidro Elementary School (1998)
- Roberto J. Santos Elementary School (2024)
- Trautmann Elementary School (1995)
- Veterans Memorial Elementary School (2012)
- Senator Judith Zaffirini Elementary School (1993)

Former school

- United D.D. Hachar Elementary School
- Matias De Llano Elementary School
- Amparo Gutierrez Elementary School
