= Colonia (United States) =

Type of slum in the United States, found near the border with Mexico

In the United States, a colonia is a type of unincorporated, low-income, slum area located along the Mexico–United States border region that emerged with the advent of shanty towns.

The colonias consist of peri-urban subdivisions of substandard housing lacking in basic services such as potable water, electricity, paved roads, proper drainage, and waste management. Often situated in geographically inferior locations, such as former agricultural floodplains, colonias suffer from associated issues like flooding.

Furthermore, urbanization practices have amplified the issues, such as developers stripping topsoil from the ground to subdivide land, and the resulting plains then become breeding grounds for mosquitoes and disease. Traditional homeownership financing methods are rare among colonia residents and so the areas consist of ramshackle housing units that are built incrementally with found material on expanses of undeveloped land. Colonias have a predominant Latino population, and 85 percent of those Latinos under the age of 18 are United States citizens. The U.S. has viewed border communities as a place of lawlessness, poverty, backwardness, and ethnic difference.

Despite economic development, liberalization, intensification of trade, the strategic geographic location of the southern U.S. border region does not stop it from being one of the poorest in the nation. Most cases had shown that its communities formed after landowners illegally sold and subdivided rural lands, often to buyers who did not understand the terms under which this land was being sold. The contract for deed through which plots were offered by land developers often had false promises that utilities would be installed.

The majority of the communities have no water infrastructure and lack wastewater or sewage services. Where sewer systems exist, there are no treatment plants in the area, and untreated wastewater is dumped into arroyos and creeks that flow into the Rio Grande or the Gulf of Mexico.

More than 2,000 colonias are identified within the U.S. The highest concentration is in the Rio Grande Valley, Texas, with others in New Mexico, Arizona, and California. Evidence suggests that in 2007 there were more than 1,800 designated colonias in Texas, around 138 in New Mexico, 77 in Arizona, and 32 in California. These settlements are part of an informal sector or informal economy that is not bound by the structures of government regulations within labor, tax, health and safety, land use, environmental, civil rights, and immigration laws.

== Etymology ==
The Spanish word colonia means a 'colony' or 'community'. In Mexican Spanish, it is specifically a 'residential quarter [of a city]', and a colonia proletaria is a shantytown. In Spanglish, the English-Spanish mix, colonia began to be used to refer primarily to Mexican neighborhoods about thirty years ago. A 1977 study uses the term colonia to describe rural desert settlements with inadequate infrastructure and unsafe housing stock. Since these Hispanic neighborhoods were less affluent, the word also connoted poverty and substandard housing. In the 1990s, colonias became a common American English name for the slums that developed on both sides of the Mexico–United States border.

The history of the word colonias in the United States, and its interpretation through politics, suggests that places called colonias are not to be perceived as natural or prosperous communities. In many parts of Texas, Spanish-language terms are often used to frame and highlight a class difference. The term colonia is an essential symbol for public policy in the United States, and this Spanish name is a critical component for constructing public and policy attention, underscoring the settlements' differences and labeling them as racialized and distinct places, which has a powerful way of constructing and reinforcing marginality.

== Definition ==
Section 916 of the Cranston–Gonzalez National Affordable Housing Act (1990) (NAHA) defines colonias as any "identifiable community" determined by objective criteria that include the lack of potable water and adequate sewage systems, the lack of decent, safe, and sanitary housing, and which were in existence before the passage of the Act. According to the U.S. Department of Housing and Urban Development (HUD), the term colonias has a specific meaning within the U.S., referring to a community within the rural Mexico–U.S. border region with marginal conditions related to housing and infrastructure. Other definitions and criteria for a colonia are used by the Environmental Protection Agency, the U.S. Department of Agriculture, and the Texas Code.

== History ==
Researchers traced the first colonias in Texas to the 1950s and early 1960s. These appeared as an informal housing solution for low-income predominantly Hispanic wage-earners through a model referred to by scholars as the "incremental approach". Due to the rise of the maquiladora industry—foreign-owned factories in Mexico creating goods for export—the border population quickly grew and in 1965 created a housing shortage for these workers. The overlap of four variables attributed to the development of colonias: high demand from a population of low-income wage earners meeting a low supply of affordable housing, a supply of low-cost and fruitless land, the absence of regulations on the subdivision of that land, and a legal way for that land to be sold to individuals. Land developers began purchasing low-value land in peri-urban areas where strict enforcement of housing and environmental laws was either weak or nonexistent. During this period the sale of rural lands without basic housing policies was lawful. Colonias were hidden from view due to physical isolation and properties were divided into small lots, which would be bought by low-income families via contracts for deed. These deals, which sold unimproved lots, included undocumented and thus unenforceable promises to provide basic provisions such as water, sewage, and electricity. Because these deals lacked a foreclosure period or buyer's protection, any property that was not paid in full could be repossessed and resold by the sellers, who retained title for the land and were allowed to keep all payments the buyer had made. As more dwellings appeared with minimal infrastructure, the value of the land decreased and ultimately became more affordable as a living option for low-income families on the border.

Colonia communities grew rapidly in the 1990s when the number of residents almost doubled from 1990 to 1996. This can be subject to the effects of globalization and the passage of the North American Free Trade Agreement (NAFTA) in 1994, which industrialized the Mexico–United States border, created many jobs, and encouraged migration. People shifted from traditional agricultural labor to work in transportation, construction, and manufacturing. This led to an increased informality of U.S. housing, with colonias forming and growing because of the border's strategic location and trade liberalizations. However, due to the lack of financial mobility, colonia residents face significant challenges escaping the colonia bubble. In June 1996, the Texas Department of Housing and Community Affairs successfully obtained a waiver from the U.S. Department of Housing and Urban Development (HUD) to set new housing-standards for colonias. The resulting standards provided a basis for safe and sanitary housing to alleviate the existing health risks. These standards are necessary for economic development in colonias because unsafe infrastructures and lack of education and jobs inhibit their growth.

As of 2007, Texas had the largest concentration of colonia residents in the U.S., with approximately 400,000 living in over 2,000 colonias. New Mexico had the second largest, followed by Arizona and California. However, as remote location and stealthy development characterize many colonias, exact counts are difficult and figures can quickly change. Despite the high count of individuals living in these areas, the severity of the living standards in colonias has yet to become common knowledge for U.S. citizens. Scholars have found that little has been done to remedy the living standards of the colonians, as their situation has become normalized by the public and associated with the "lawlessness" of the Mexico–U.S. border region. Scholars have criticized the naming of these settlements as colonias, stating that the use of the Spanish word not only creates difficulties within the public policy sector of government, but also fosters the notion that these settlements are alien and not a part of the U.S. However, those within the public that do recognize colonias and their living conditions view them as "border slums", while scholars have since the 1990s described them as a "third world" within the United States. While poor living standards do persist in these areas, a positive side does exist for colonias and is often disregarded by media and policymakers. For the border region's poor, colonias provide affordable housing and the opportunity to obtain the American Dream of owning a home. Some scholars have praised colonians for seeking the realization of this dream through self-help. Because of this, the informed public has begun urging policymakers to make decisions that will not eliminate colonias but instead both enhance the living conditions and promote the incremental approach as a housing strategy, stating that this informal housing option creates opportunity.

== Colonias by state ==
Divergent state subdivision regulations have influenced the historical development of colonias, and how each state defines a colonia. Independent historical accounts should be considered by state.

=== Colonias in Texas ===
Around the 1950s, developers began creating subdivisions along the Mexico–U.S. border on agriculturally poor properties, divided land in small parcels, and provided few services; the development of the properties, intended for low-income buyers, was the beginning of the Texas colonias. By 1995, the state passed laws against developing subdivisions without services. From 1995 and 2011, the office of the Texas Attorney General had 87 judgments against developers who created properties without services. The office of the Texas Attorney General said that, by 2011, Texas had about 2,294 colonias and estimates that about 500,000 lived in the colonias. As of 2011 Hidalgo County has the largest number of colonias in Texas, though estimating their population is difficult due to isolation, shared addresses, rapid changes in development, and mistrust of government.

=== Colonias in New Mexico ===
In New Mexico, about 150 colonias have qualified for colonia-funding sources such as HUD, U.S. Department of Agriculture (USDA), etc. In New Mexico, there are two types of colonias: small towns and subdivisions. Although many of New Mexico's colonias consist of rural small towns, they were considered colonias because of the absence of resources. Conflicts with acceptable water, sewers, and safe and clean housing that the colonias faced brought on the requirement of Section 916 of the National Affordable Housing Act of 1992.

In New Mexico, land was sold contract-for-deed; however, before 1990, New Mexicans were allowed to divide their property into four parcels without violating the law. Within a couple of years, landowners were then allowed to split their land into two parcels, but after some time, the subdivision law was amended to close this "loophole utilized by colonia developers".

== Characteristics ==
=== Demographics ===
Colonias can be found in each U.S. state on the Mexican border: Texas, New Mexico, Arizona, and California. Residents are mostly Hispanic and about 65% of the colonia population were born in the United States. Overall, colonias consist of low-income communities with families that cannot afford goods in a formal economy. In a random survey by the Texas Department of State Health Services, it was found that half of the families have incomes of less than $834 a month. About 70% of colonia residents have not graduated from high school and many lack English-language skills, which hampers their job mobility, suppresses wages, and the ability to seek assistance. The unemployment rate for families in colonias is 18%, compared to 11% in neighboring cities.

Residents of colonias pay, on average, 58% of their income on housing. In comparison, a two-bedroom apartment in Albuquerque, New Mexico, costs $830, in 2014, only 20% of the average income in the U.S. Colonia housing costs too much relative to the resident earnings and the living conditions are significantly worse.

=== Housing ===
Colonias may be lacking in all types of essential physical infrastructure and public services, such as clean water, sanitary sewage, and adequate roads. Most colonia housing does not meet construction standards and building codes. Houses are often built little by little, starting as shabby tents of wood and cardboard. Only 54% of colonia residents in Texas have sewer service and about 50% drink water from a non-tap source. Because they do not qualify for financing, Colonia residents buy their land on a contract for deed, in which land ownership stays with the seller until the entire purchase is paid. This land eventually ends up to be worthless as the market for colonia housing is very low. Most houses cannot pass inspections to qualify for repairs and further improvements. The housing situation in Cameron County, Texas lacks certain infrastructure and requires $44 million to upgrade all of the homes. Financially, families living in colonias lack the assets to add improvements in order for sustainability.

These poor minority communities are also prime targets for hazardous waste facilities because of their inability to file lawsuits. Most such facilities in New Mexico are located within a 10-mile (16 km) radius of a colonia. These include landfills, power plants, and waste facilities which all have negative impacts on the communities' lifelong health. The legal options available to colonia residents to fight the placement of these facilities are slim. Many are unaware of the public benefits available to them, and applying for benefits can be a struggle when extensive documentation and many visits to state offices are required. Ultimately, immigrants in the border region face language barriers and fear of retaliation against family members without any form of identification.

=== Health disparities ===
==== Health-related quality of life ====
A 2008 pilot study of factors affecting health-related quality of life (HRQL) of Mexican-American adults living in colonias found that colonia residents fall below the U.S. average. By examining Mexican-Americans residing in Hidalgo County, Texas, investigators found that Mexican Americans living in colonias share similar mental health patterns compared to the U.S. average but their physical health was worse. Data collected through a household survey in 2002 and 2003 by the Integrated Health Outreach System Project (IHOS) was analyzed to describe the population in terms of sociodemographic status, HRQL, and other variables. In the responses to this survey, 81% considered that access to healthcare services was a problem; 62.5% mentioned housing; 76.5% perceived not having enough recreational and cultural activities; 86% perceived social issues; and 41.1% perceived physical environmental problems, specifically polluted air or water. In conclusion, the research provides significant data acknowledging health disparities colonia residents continuously face.

In June 2010 The Lawyers' Committee for Civil Rights Under Law released a report that claims there is enough data in the historical record to demonstrate a direct correlation between abated health outcomes, health disparities, and premature morbidity and mortality with one's zip code. Researchers have determined that, for people of color or low income, this can predetermine their life expectancy.

==== Alcohol use, anxiety, traumatic stress, and hopelessness ====
In a 2009 study, a participatory model of one hundred Mexican-origin colonia residents showed that participants who met the criteria for alcohol dependence showed more symptoms of anxiety and post-traumatic stress than the national average. Investigators found that among Mexican-American immigrants, lifetime prevalence for any anxiety disorder in men was 9% and 18% for women. For Mexican Americans born in the United States, 20% of men and 27% of women met the criteria for anxiety disorders. Mexican Americans living in colonia have considerable health risks due to unsafe living conditions, low educational attainment, high unemployment, comparatively high rates of communicable illness, lack of access to health care, and poverty. Furthermore, the study found that people living in colonias had the highest rates of binge drinking and alcohol dependence correlated with anxiety, traumatic stress, and hopelessness.

In a 2005 study, researchers found that "people with low socioeconomic status have dramatically higher disease risks and shorter life spans" than wealthier people. Therefore, poor people have less access to health care and more incidents of harmful lifestyles associated with drinking, smoking, and obesity.

==== School-based nutrition ====
In nutritional research, investigators assessed the experiences of child food insecurity and seasonal instability within Mexican-origin mother-child dyads living in Mexico–U.S. border colonias. By focusing on food insecurity, which is known to cause health effects across a lifespan, investigators sought to understand the effects of school-based and summertime nutrition programs among women and their children, specifically in Texas-border colonias. An important attribute of this research was that the study depended on a multi-level analysis, which relied on repeated measurements. It also took into account the perceptions and experiences of children within the research.

According to research, food insecurity among Hispanic and Mexican-origin U.S. households exceeds national estimates (Nalty, 2013). Furthermore, in 2011, 26.2% of Hispanic families in the United States were food insecure, and 17.4% households with child-food insecurity were Hispanic.

==== Childhood obesity ====
In consultation with local decision-makers, 2013 research of childhood obesity in Mexican-American low-income communities resulted in recommendations addressing related issues in communities like colonias. Four policy ideas came about:

- establishing sustainable community-based health programs;
- improving neighborhood infrastructure and safety;
- increasing access to parks;
- supporting community organizations to disseminate health education to parents and children.

According to a 2009 study by R. Gottlieb, food issues "are particularly pronounced in low-income communities where lack of access to fresh, affordable healthy food has direct health and nutritional consequences". He explains that core land-use factors such as housing, transportation, and commercial space are issues of food justice and environmental justice, and that addressing these issues can help reduce health disparities among border residents.

=== Education ===
Education in the border region is substandard on both sides. While completion and attainment rates are much higher in the U.S. than in Mexico, they are far below the U.S. average. The low levels of education along the border region are due to lack of proper infrastructure, low property-tax funding for schools, and pressing financial need which sees children contributing to family incomes. The primary problem with the education system in colonias is the lack of funding.

In Texas, the Texas Education Agency determines education directives while the majority of school funding comes from local property taxes. For the low-income colonias, these directives can present fiscal obstacles which stand in the way of the quality of education. Population growth among the colonias make it so the funding of education is controversial and socially divisive. There is also a problem in finding direct-service providers who will educate the children in the colonias. School districts have taken measures to attract teachers to the prospect of working in these areas, though finding qualified teachers has become an increasingly difficult task.

== Public policy action ==
Rather than being illegal, colonias are considered "extra-legal", in that they circumnavigate the law rather than violating it. In response to these systems, scholars are split between egalitarian and libertarian approaches. Those that support the egalitarian approach believe that colonias currently demonstrate a notion of inferiority for those that dwell there; in response, they propose standards of living enforced by government regulation. However, supporters of the libertarian style favor the informality of this living system for providing an affordable housing option for those in need, and criticize government action to impose living standards without providing colonians with the resources to sustain them.

As of 2010 the housing quality of colonias continues to be unregulated. Informality in housing continues to expand while the social distance between the middle class and lower class expands. Fewer opportunities are available to the uneducated and poor. However, legal expert Jane Larson has proposed a policy of progressive realization, which would gradually extend standards in colonias. Incentives, such as microcredit programs, are being implemented which then allow families to reach acceptable levels of housing quality. The model addresses equality by setting a standard for housing based upon compliance of available resources, and would commit the government and people towards the common goal of sustainable housing. However, this does not mean that governments do not have obligations once a certain standard is reached. The progressive realization model requires continual progress in a relationship between law and society, which directly corresponds to the choices of those living in colonias.

Enhancing the lives of the colonians through policy has proven to be difficult and slow. Funding for infrastructure projects for colonias is contingent on defining a "colonia", and establishing effective criteria for this purpose has proven to be a challenge. The Farm Housing provisions of the United States Code define a colonia as a community that (1) is in the state of Arizona, California, New Mexico, or Texas; (2) is within 150 miles (240 km) of the Mexico–U.S. border (except for any metropolitan area exceeding one million people); (3) on the basis of objective criteria, lacks adequate sewage systems and lacks decent, safe, and sanitary housing; and (4) existed as a colonia before November 28, 1990. Other definitions are used by specific governmental agencies (e.g.: HUD, USDA, Environmental Protection Agency [EPA], and the Texas Code). Many scholars criticize the existing federal criteria as being too broad in that most definitions of colonias are based on the archetype that exists on the border in Texas. While colonias in Texas are known for being peri-urban settlements with mostly Hispanic dwellers, settlements in California are located in old rural towns with ethnically diverse populations. This has hindered colonia infrastructure development in California. Criteria have also been described as too narrow, relying on numeric values to determine whether a settlement qualifies. Under the U.S. Department of Housing and Urban Development (HUD), funds designated within the Community Development Block Grant (CDBG) were to benefit colonias along the Mexico–U.S. border, defined by various numeric values. However, colonias such as those in Riverside and San Diego counties are disqualified from the CBDG for being within metropolitan statistical areas (MSAs) with over a million people. Similarly, the U.S. Department of Agriculture limits its colonias to settlements of no more than 20,000 residents, disqualifying the majority of communities seeking funding in California. The EPA's definition of colonias derives from NAFTA, which limits these colonias to a 62-mile (100 km) distance from the border. This limits all designated colonias in California to roughly the area of Imperial County.

=== Programs ===
==== Multinational environmental agreements ====
The North American Agreement on Environmental Cooperation (NAAEC) is an international environmental-agreement between the governments of Canada, Mexico, and the United States. NAFTA sought to promote economic growth by lowering most of the existing barriers to trade. While many advocates of NAFTA argued that it would indirectly increase the standard of living and thus environmental spending on the border, many critics commented on the fact that only a single sentence in the agreement's preamble addressed the environmental impacts of promoting free trade. In order to ensure that NAFTA would pass, the Clinton Administration pushed for NAAEC as a side agreement specifically to aid border environmental issues. From NAAEC came the creation of the Commission on Environmental Cooperation (CEC), an institution providing a forum for environmental-law enforcement disputes to be resolved. Scholars generally agree that the NAAEC's diction is ambiguous and does not clearly define the authority that the organization has; it is also unclear whether violators are obligated to respond to inquiries made by the CEC, and thus few parties have actually been investigated and punished for failing to cooperate.

The charter creating the Border Environment Cooperation Commission (BECC) and North American Development Bank (NADB) was the first multinational agreement to address the problems faced by colonians. These two binational institutions were created to resolve issues that revolve around land contamination and sustainable water/wastewater infrastructure and compensate for CEC's shortcomings. However, BECC/NADB does not explicitly address the colonias themselves but rather the Mexico–U.S. border, defining the border as areas in the U.S. "within 100 kilometers [62 miles] and the area in Mexico that is within 300 kilometers [190 miles] of the international boundary." BECC/NADB consists of a board comprising members from both the U.S. and Mexican governments, and thus lies equally within the jurisdiction of each nation's government; this includes the Administrator for EPA and the Secretaries of State and Treasury from the U.S., and the Secretaries for the Environment and Natural Resources, Treasury, and External Relations from Mexico, as well as one state representative and non-governmental organization from each country. The BECC certifies projects that meet criteria in order to receive funding from the NADB. Projects can be proposed by anyone; in doing this, the BECC/NADB seek to promote public participation in sustainably developing the Mexico–U.S. border.

Though the programs have been praised as revolutionary, critics have said progress is slow with NADB; it failed to fund a single infrastructure project within a year of its creation, despite the approval of several projects by BECC. These programs have been criticized for failing to consider who will pay to maintain the completed infrastructure. Because BECC is not a regulatory agency, its decisions are not enforceable. Critics of BECC/NADB have suggested the implementation of punitive measures such as monetary penalties to complement the system of incentives currently in place.

==== U.S. Department of Housing and Urban Development ====
The Crantston-Gonzalez National Affordable Housing Act of 1990 was created to help families that did not own homes to make down-payments for purchasing homes, expand on the supply of affordable housing for low-income families, and promote cooperation between all levels of government and the private sector in this expansion. The Act is considered one of the most-important policies relating to U.S. colonias for setting aside funds from the Community Development Block Grant Program (CDBG) to go directly towards enhancing their living standards, and bringing to the public an awareness of colonias in California, Arizona, and New Mexico. These CDBG funds are particularly used to improve potable water, sewer systems, and sanitary housing in the colonias. The Act is credited for inspiring other agencies, such as the EPA, to fund programs targeting development on the Mexico–U.S. border.

Critics have stated that HUD's focus has been on preventing the development of colonias rather than seeking to provide those of low-income with a larger supply of affordable housing. As is the case with BECC/NADB, critics have also claimed that the projects seeking to improve infrastructure have been underwhelming. Scholars have urged the HUD to make use of its ability to work with the private sector by encouraging private investment in the direct development of the current colonias. Rather than eliminating the colonias, many have proposed to instead have the private sector create better dwellings at low costs within the area while also improving the already-established dwellings.

== Advocacy groups ==
Housing and community advocacy organizations work to alleviate poverty in colonias by promoting self-help housing programs that provide colonia residents with resources to build their own homes, fostering community empowerment and raising public awareness. These groups include the Texas Low Income Housing Information Service (TxLIHIS), an affordable-housing-advocacy nonprofit organization, and the Colonias Development Council in New Mexico.

== See also ==
- Pueblos jóvenes, the vast shantytowns of Lima, Peru
- Favela, Brazilian shantytowns or slums, primarily in Rio de Janeiro.
- Cortiço in Brazil and Portugal, a poor urban area.
- Maquiladora, manufacturing operation in free trade zone.

== Bibliography ==
- Gangster, Paul and David E. Lorey, 2008. The US-Mexican Border into the Twentieth Century
- Mangin, William and John F.C. Turner. 1968. "Barrida Movement", Progressive Architecture, 37:56:154-62.
- Mangin, William. 1967. "Latin American Squatter Settlements: A Problem and a Solution." Latin American Research Review. 2:3: 65–98 (Summer, 1967)
- Peach, J., and J. Williams. 2003. Population and Economic Dynamics on the U.S.-Mexican Border: Past, Present, and Future. Southwest Consortium of Environmental Research and Policy Monograph 1: "The U.S.-Mexico Border Region: A Road Map to a Sustainable 2020" (May 27, 2008), https://web.archive.org/web/20090325114635/http://scerp.org/pubs/m1c4.pdf.
- Turner, John F.C. 1963. "Dwelling Resources in South America." Architectural Design 37:360-93.
- Turner, John F.C. 1972. "Housing as a Verb." in Freedom to Build. Ed Robert Fichter and John F. C. Turner. New York: The MacMillan Company.
- Turner, John F.C. 1976. Housing by People: Towards Autonomy in Building Environments. London: Marion Boyars.
- Turner, John F.C. 1982. "Issues in Self-Help and Self-Managed Housing." in Self-Help Housing: A Critique. ed. Peter M. Ward London: Mansell Press. 99–113.
- Turner, John F.C. 1991. "Foreword." in Beyond Self-Help Housing. Ed. Mathéy, K. London: Mansell Press.
- United Nations Center for Human Settlements (UNCHS) 2007. Enhancing Urban Safety and Security: Global Report on Human Settlements. London: Earthscan.
- Ward, Peter M. 1978. "Self-help housing in Mexico City: Social and Economic Determinants of Success," Town Planning Review. 49:38–50.
- Ward, Peter M. 1999. Colonias and Public Policy in Texas and Mexico; Urbanization by Stealth. Austin: University of Texas Press http://www.netlibrary.com/Reader/ (May 27, 2008).
- Ward, Peter M. 2005. "The Lack of Cursive Thinking in Social Theory and Public Policy: Four Decades of Marginality and Rationality in the So-Called 'Slum.'" in Rethinking Development in Latin America. ed B. Roberts and C. Wood. University Park, PA: Penn State U Press 271–296.
- Ward, Peter M. 2007. "Colonias, Informal Homestead Subdivisions, and Self-Help Care for the Elderly Among Mexican Populations in the United States." in The Health of Aging Hispanics; The Mexican-Origin Population. Eds. Jacqueline L Angel and Keith E. Whitfield. New York: Springer. 141–162.
- Ward, Peter M. and J. Carew. 2000. "Absentee Lot Owners in Texas Colonias: Who Are They and What Do They Want?" Habitat International. 24:327–345.
- Ward, Peter M. and Paul A. Peters. 2007. "Self-Help Housing and Informal Homesteading in Peri-Urban America: Settlement Identification Using Digital Imagery and GIS." Habitat International 31:205–218.
- Ward, Peter M., E. Jimenez, and G. Jones. 1993. "Residential land price changes in Mexican cities and the affordability of land for low-income groups". Urban Studies 30:9:1521-1542.
- Ward, Peter M., Flavio de Souza, and Cecilia Guisti. 2004. "'Colonia' Land Housing Market Performance and the Impact of Lot Title Regularization in Texas." Urban Studies 41:13:2621-2646.
- Ward, Peter ed. 1982. Self-Help Housing: A Critique. London: Mansell Press.
- Ward, Peter. 2004. "Informality of Housing Production at the Urban-Rural Interface: the Not-So-Strange Case of Colonias in the U.S., Texas, the Border and Beyond." in Urban Informality, ed. Anaya Roy and Nezar AlSayyad 243–270. Berkeley, California: Lexington Center for Middle Eastern Studies.
- Wilson R. and Menzies P 1997. The colonias water bill: communities demanding change.
- Wilson, Robert Hines. 1997. "Public policy and community: activism and governance in Texas". Austin: University of Texas Press. pp. 229–274.

=== Additional sources ===
- Pepin, Madeleine, "Texas Colonias: An Environmental Justice Case Study"
- Huntoon, Laura and Becker, Barbara, 2001, "Colonias in Arizona: A Changing Definition with Changing Location"

Slideshows

- Hidden America: Life in the Colonias ABC News
