= Miss USA 2026 =

75th edition of the Miss USA competition

- Date: August 27, 2026
- Presenters: Kenya Moore; Ian Ziering
- Venue: Adrienne Arsht Center for the Performing Arts, Miami, Florida
- Broadcaster: Queen Beauty Network (Note: To be streamed only in the United States); iWant TV (Note: International, mainly Southeast Asia only including the Philippines)
- Entrants: 51
- Placements: 20
- Winner: Justus Kelley; Virginia
- Congeniality: Amber Uhler, Michigan
- Best State Costume: Katie Tetreault, Idaho
- Photogenic: Acacia McBride, California

Miss USA 2026 was the 75th Miss USA pageant, held at the Adrienne Arsht Center for the Performing Arts in Miami, Florida on August 27, 2026.

Audrey Eckert of Nebraska crowned Justus Kelley of Virginia as her successor at the end of the event. This marked the state's first title in 56 years, with Kelley also becoming the oldest woman and the first married person to be crowned. Kelley will represent the United States at the Miss Universe 2026 pageant to be held in San Juan, Puerto Rico.

== Background ==
=== Location ===
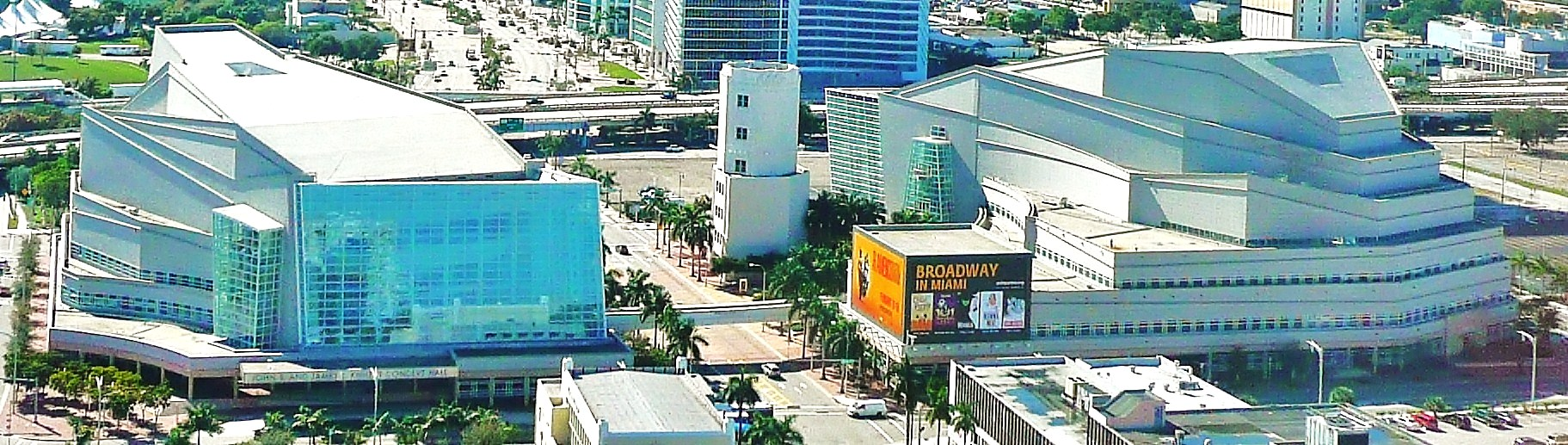
Adrienne Arsht Center for the Performing Arts, venue of the pageant

On March 5, 2026, it was announced that the competition will take place in Miami, Florida, marking the first pageant in the state since 1986. A month later, it was announced the venue will be held at Adrienne Arsht Center for the Performing Arts.

=== Broadcaster ===
On June 23, 2026, it was announced the pageant was originally to be aired on The CW on what would be its third time in four years after having previously signed a three-year deal in 2024. However, on August 20, a week before the pageant, The CW pulled off from the schedule along with concurrent Teen USA pageant in favor for the Queen Beauty Network streaming platform for its second consecutive year and still scheduled as planned.

=== Selection of contestants ===
The selection of contestants for the state pageants took place in May to July 2026. The first state pageant was Arkansas and held on May 3, 2026, the final state pageant was the tri-states of Maryland, New Jersey, and New York, was held on July 26, 2026.

Brittany Boltinhouse, the original Miss North Carolina USA 2026, dethroned weeks before the pageant was due to begin in Miami, due to past racism and homophobic slurs. She is replaced by Myla Hadley, who was the first runner-up of the pageant. This was the first time since the 2020 pageant where the original winner being replaced by an appointee, the last time was Katie Bozner of Wyoming. (Note: Hadley also competed in Miss Alabama USA and finished fifth runner-up.)

=== Appointed contestants ===
As with the previous year, several states in the competition can not hold traditional state pageants due to state directorship contract issues and will get via an open casting call conducting by the national organization. On May 15, 2026, it was announced sixteen states will give an open casting call with applications in separate parts.

The first Open Call began voting in early June and those states are Georgia, Idaho, Kentucky, New Hampshire, Pennsylvania, Tennessee, Texas, and Vermont into three voting rounds each, the top two on each assigned group from the final voting round would make it to the judges round upon submitting their videos determining those hopefuls would select the eight women to appoint each of the eight state titles. The second Open call for the remaining eight states began voting at the end of June with the "Redemption Round" twist to have selected first batch eliminated hopefuls would have got a second chance, with new hopefuls began voting in mid-July; those states are Colorado, Michigan, Mississippi, Montana, Ohio, Oregon, Washington, and Wyoming with the same format.

== Results ==
External videos
- Miss USA 2026 Finals
- MISS USA 2026 - FINAL COMPETITION by Miss USA

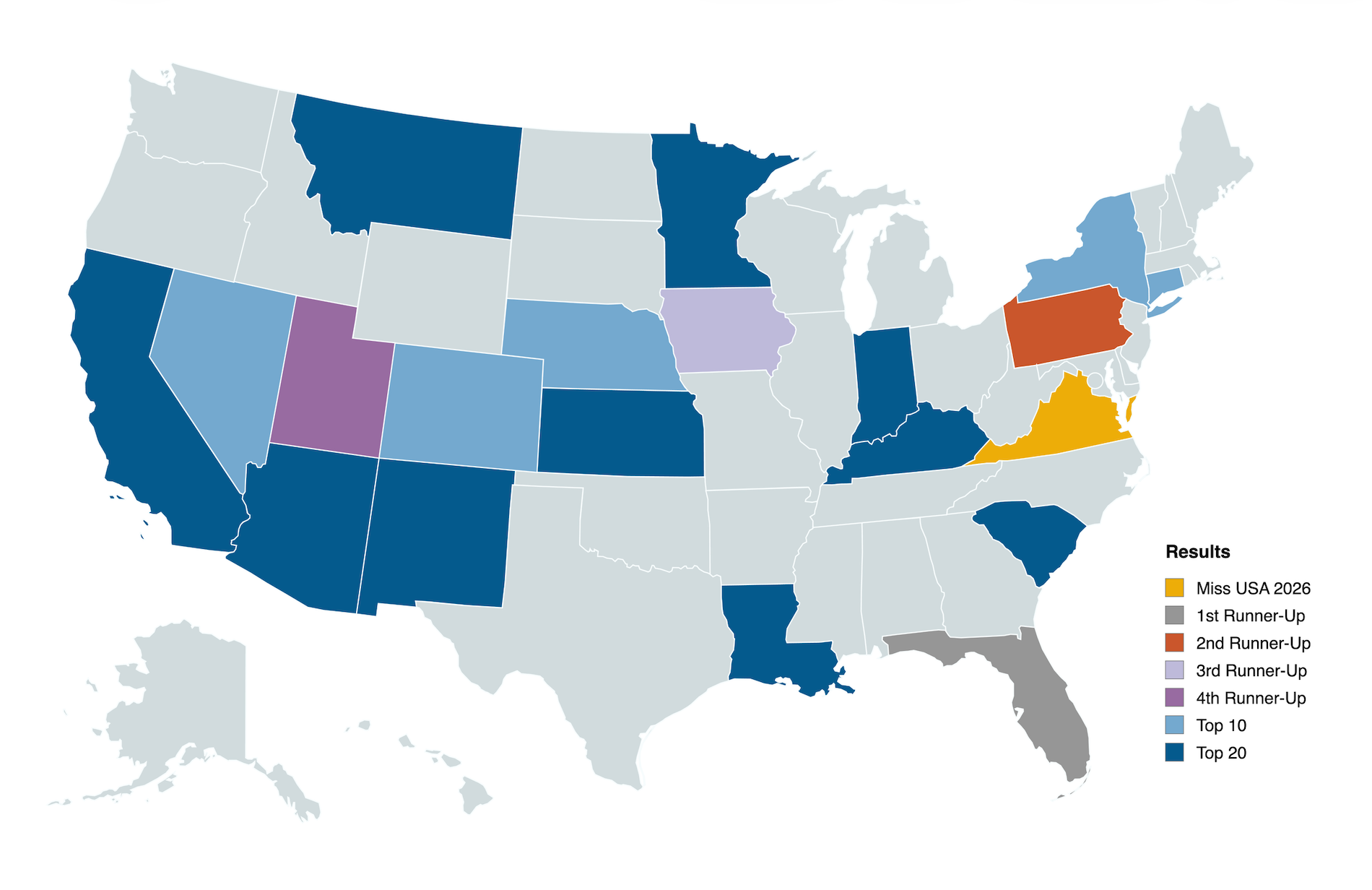
Miss USA 2026 results.

Placement	Contestant
Miss USA 2026	Virginia – Justus Kelley
1st Runner-Up	Florida – Aileen Cerchiara
2nd Runner-Up	Pennsylvania – Elizabeth Voight
3rd Runner-Up	Iowa – Madeline Erickson
4th Runner-Up	Utah – Alayzia Christopher
Top 10	Colorado – Jordyn Owen §; Connecticut – Jaeden Hamelly; Nebraska – Emily Lenser; Nevada – Natalie Bode; (New York (state)) New York – Jenna Dykstra
Top 20	Arizona – Kaitlyn Humphrey; California – Acacia McBride; Indiana – Eniolá Oke; Kansas – Madilynn Becker §; Kentucky – Brijet Finister; Louisiana – Ella Clark §; Minnesota – Rachel Betterley; Montana – Lisbeth Fernández; New Mexico – Cara Rgnonti; South Carolina – Victoria Vesce

§ Voted into the Top 20 by viewers

=== Special awards ===
Award	Contestant
Miss Photogenic	California – Acacia McBride
Chelsi Smith Congeniality Award	Michigan – Amber Uhler
Best in State Costume	Idaho – Katie Tetreault
Preliminary Best in Swimsuit	Virginia – Justus Kelley
Cheslie Kryst Interview Award	Iowa – Madeline Erickson
FLIXXE Ambassador Award	Oklahoma – Annamaria Thomas
People's Choice	Louisiana – Ella Clark

== Pageant ==
=== Format ===
The process for determining the semi-finalists was similar to that of the previous year. The preliminary competition will consist of three segments: the swimsuit competition, the evening gown competition, and a closed-door interview, which will determine the first 16 semi-finalists to advance from the initial cut.

For the second consecutive year, an internet vote was held, in which the three contestants with the most votes will automatically advance to the semifinals.

The remaining 20 semi-finalists will compete in the swimsuit competition, from which 10 will be selected to advance. These 10 then will compete in the evening gown competition, narrowing the field to five finalists. Finally, the five finalists will face the final question round, after which the winner of Miss USA 2026 and her runners-up will be announced.

=== Judges ===
- Deshauna Barber — Miss USA 2016 from the District of Columbia and Miss Universe 2016 Top 9 finalist
- Madison Anderson — Miss Universe Puerto Rico 2019 and Miss Universe 2019 First Runner-Up
- Angelica Nwandu — Nigerian-American media personality and CEO of The Shade Room
- Michelle McLean — Miss Universe 1992 from Namibia
- Mia Michaels — Choreographer and judge on So You Think You Can Dance
- Steven Grossman — Celebrity Talent Manager & Producer at Untitled Entertainment

== Legacy celebration ==
As part of the pageant's 75th anniversary, a number of Miss USA titleholders from the second pageant in 1953 to the former titleholders are in attendance.

- Myrna Hansen - Miss USA 1953 from Illinois
- Terry Lynn Huntingdon - Miss USA 1959 from California
- Marite Ozers - Miss USA 1963 from Illinois
- Bobbie Johnson - Miss USA 1964 from District of Columbia
- Sue Ann Downey - Miss USA 1965 from Ohio
- Maria Remenyi - Miss USA 1966 from California
- Cheryl Patton - Miss USA 1967 from Florida
- Wendy Dascomb - Miss USA 1969 from Virginia
- Tanya Wilson - Miss USA 1972 from Hawaii
- Karen Morrison - Miss USA 1974 from Illinois
- Barbara Peterson - Miss USA 1976 from Minnesota
- Kimberly Tomes - Miss USA 1977 from Texas
- Judi Andersen - Miss USA 1978 from Hawaii
- Jineane Ford - Miss USA 1980 from Arizona
- Terri Utley - Miss USA 1982 from Arkansas
- Julie Hayek - Miss USA 1983 from California
- Gretchen Polhemus - Miss USA 1989 from Texas
- Carole Gist - Miss USA 1990 from Michigan
- Shannon Marketic - Miss USA 1992 from California
- Kenya Moore - Miss USA 1993 from Michigan
- Lu Parker - Miss USA 1994 from South Carolina
- Shanna Moakler - Miss USA 1995 from New York
- Brandi Sherwood - Miss USA 1997 from Idaho
- Shawnae Jebbia - Miss USA 1998 from Massachusetts
- Shauntay Hinton - Miss USA 2002 from District of Columbia
- Susie Castillo - Miss USA 2003 from Massachusetts
- Shandi Finnessey - Miss USA 2004 from Missouri
- Tara Conner - Miss USA 2006 from Kentucky
- Crystle Stewart - Miss USA 2008 from Texas
- Kristen Dalton - Miss USA 2009 from North Carolina
- Rima Fakih - Miss USA 2010 from Michigan
- Alyssa Campanella - Miss USA 2011 from California
- Nana Meriwether - Miss USA 2012 from Maryland
- Nia Sanchez - Miss USA 2014 from Nevada
- Olivia Jordan - Miss USA 2015 from Oklahoma
- Deshauna Barber - Miss USA 2016 from District of Columbia
- Sarah Rose Summers - Miss USA 2018 from Nebraska
- Cheslie Kryst - Miss USA 2019 from North Carolina (Note: Kryst's mother April Simpkins, attended the legacy on her behalf)
- Asya Branch - Miss USA 2020 from Mississippi
- Elle Smith - Miss USA 2021 from Kentucky
- Morgan Romano - Miss USA 2022 from North Carolina
- Noelia Voigt - Miss USA 2023 from Utah

== Contestants ==
All 51 contestants are competing for the title.

State/District	Contestant	Age (Note: Ages at the time of the pageant)	Hometown	Notes
Alabama	Samantha Havenstrite	27	Birmingham	
Alaska	Holly Huber	26	Juneau	
Arizona	Kaitlyn Humphrey	23	Scottsdale	
Arkansas	Anna Claire Hay	23	Siloam Springs	Previously Miss Arkansas Teen USA 2020; Top 16 at Miss Teen USA 2020
California	Acacia McBride	28	Calabasas	
Colorado	Jordyn Owen^{†}	30	Catalina Foothills, AZ	
Connecticut	Jaeden Hamelly	30	New London	
Delaware	Julia Hatoum	24	Hockessin	
District of Columbia	Kennedy Lucas	28	Washington, D.C.	
Florida	Aileen Cerchiara	26	Tampa	
Georgia	Jade Kircus^{†}	36	Southside, AL	
Hawaii	Darja Bassut	23	Waiʻanae	
Idaho	Katie Tetreault^{†}	30	Eagle	
Illinois	Vivica Lewandowski	21	Barrington	Previously Miss Illinois Teen USA 2023; Top 20 at Miss Teen USA 2023; Later Miss Universe Poland 2026
Indiana	Eniolá Oke	21	Brownsburg	
Iowa	Madeline Erickson	22	Ankeny	Previously Miss Iowa Teen USA 2023; Top 20 at Miss Teen USA 2023
Kansas	Madilynn Becker	22	Herington	Previously Miss Kansas Teen USA 2021
Kentucky	Brijet Finister^{†}	36	Stockton, CA	
Louisiana	Ella Clark	24	Baton Rouge	
Maine	Mykala Green	25	Biddeford	
Maryland	Holly Plank	35	Baltimore	
Massachusetts	Kayshauna Montaño	28	West Springfield	
Michigan	Amber Uhler^{†}	41	Tampa, FL	
Minnesota	Rachel Betterley	35	Hastings	Previously Miss Minnesota 2015 under her maiden name Rachel Latuff
Mississippi	Victoria Cantu^{†}	27	Brownsville, TX	
Missouri	Madison Beck	22	Barnhart	Previously Miss Missouri Teen USA 2023; Top 20 at Miss Teen USA 2023
Montana	Lisbeth Fernández^{†}	28	Miami, FL	
Nebraska	Emily Lenser	25	Elkhorn	
Nevada	Natalie Bode	27	Las Vegas	
New Hampshire	Samantha LaBonne^{†}	34	Southbury, CT	Previously Miss Connecticut Teen USA 2011 under her maiden name Samantha Sojka
New Jersey	Katarina Lengyel	25	Middletown	
New Mexico	Cara Rgnonti	26	Rio Rancho	
New York	Jenna Dykstra	30	New York City	Previously Miss Supranational USA 2024; 1st runner-up at Miss Supranational 2024
North Carolina	Myla Hadley	24	Charlotte	Originally first runner-up, later assuming the title after winner Brittany Boltinhouse was stripped of her title in August 2026 due to a violation of conduct.
North Dakota	Sophia Richards	25	Hope	Previously Miss North Dakota 2024
Ohio	Kayelin Tiggs^{†}	34	Dayton	
Oklahoma	Annamaria Thomas	22	Miami	
Oregon	Claire Wildey^{†}	24	Clovis, CA	
Pennsylvania	Elizabeth Voight^{†}	26	Fredericksburg	
Rhode Island	Victoria Cuartas	33	East Providence	
South Carolina	Victoria Vesce	33	Charleston	
South Dakota	Lexus Paulson	28	Sioux Falls	
Tennessee	Sydney Grace Young^{†}	26	Clarksville	
Texas	Alexis Fuetsch^{†}	20	San Antonio	
Utah	Alayzia Christopher	30	Park City	
Vermont	Katherine McQuade^{†}	31	Whitestone, NY	
Virginia	Justus Kelley	31	Arlington	
Washington	Ellise Kakazu^{†}	35	Pearl City, HI	
West Virginia	Alanna Lynch	25	West Liberty	
Wisconsin	Olivia Lulich	23	Lyndon Station	Previously Miss Wisconsin Teen USA 2020
Wyoming	Melanie San Roman^{†}	30	Austin, TX	

† The chosen delegate was appointed from an Open Casting Call
