= Miss Oregon USA =

Beauty contest

- Formation: 1952
- Type: Beauty pageant
- Headquarters: Puyallup
- Location: Washington
- Members: Miss USA
- Official language: English
- Key people: Maureen Francisco
- Website: Official Website

The Miss Oregon USA competition is the pageant that selects the representative for the state of Oregon in the Miss USA pageant and the name of the title held by that winner.

The pageant was produced and directed by ABC Pageant Productions, based in Bend, Oregon, from 1989 until 2015, under Carol Jean Lukens as executive producer and state director. In the same year, David Van Maren and Maureen Franchisco took over the director duties. They were directed by NW Productions, LLC. dba- Pageants NW Productions, based in Puyallup, Washington. They resigned on August 27, 2024, and the state director of this state is now vacant.

Oregon has only had limited success at Miss USA and has yet to win the title. The highest placed Miss Oregon USA are Gail Atchison and Chantéa McIntyre, who both finished 2nd runner-up to respectively Barbara Peterson and Audrey Eckert in 1976 and 2025. The most recent finalist was Chantéa McIntyre in 2025.

Three Miss Oregon USA titleholders have formerly held the Miss Oregon Teen USA title and competed at Miss Teen USA.

Claire Wildey of Clovis, CA was appointed Miss Oregon USA on July 30, 2026, after the open casting call from Thomas Brodeur, the new owner of the national pageant. She will represent Oregon at Miss USA 2026.

== Gallery of titleholders ==
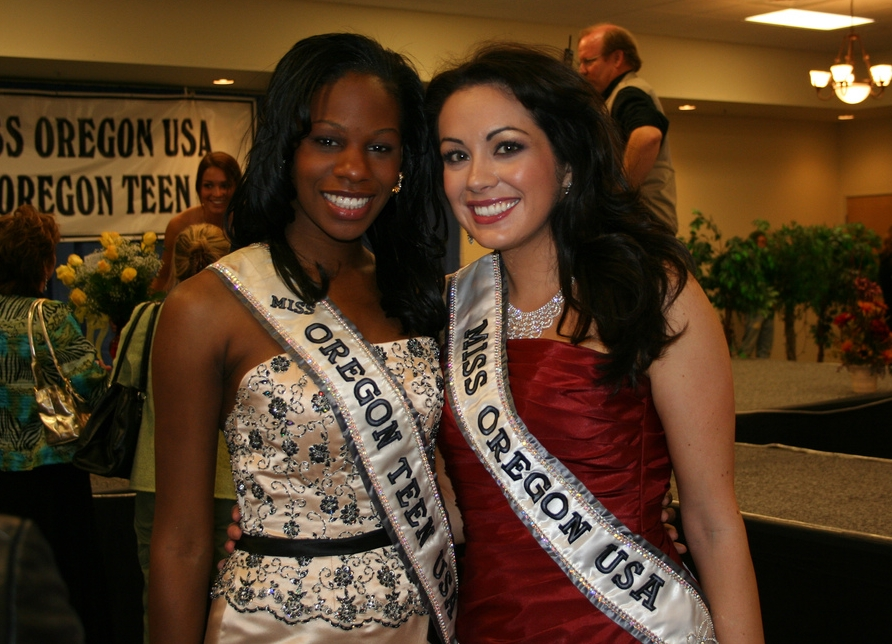
Kelci Flowers, Miss Oregon Teen USA 2006 and Allison Machado, Miss Oregon USA 2006 at the Miss Oregon USA 2007 pageant

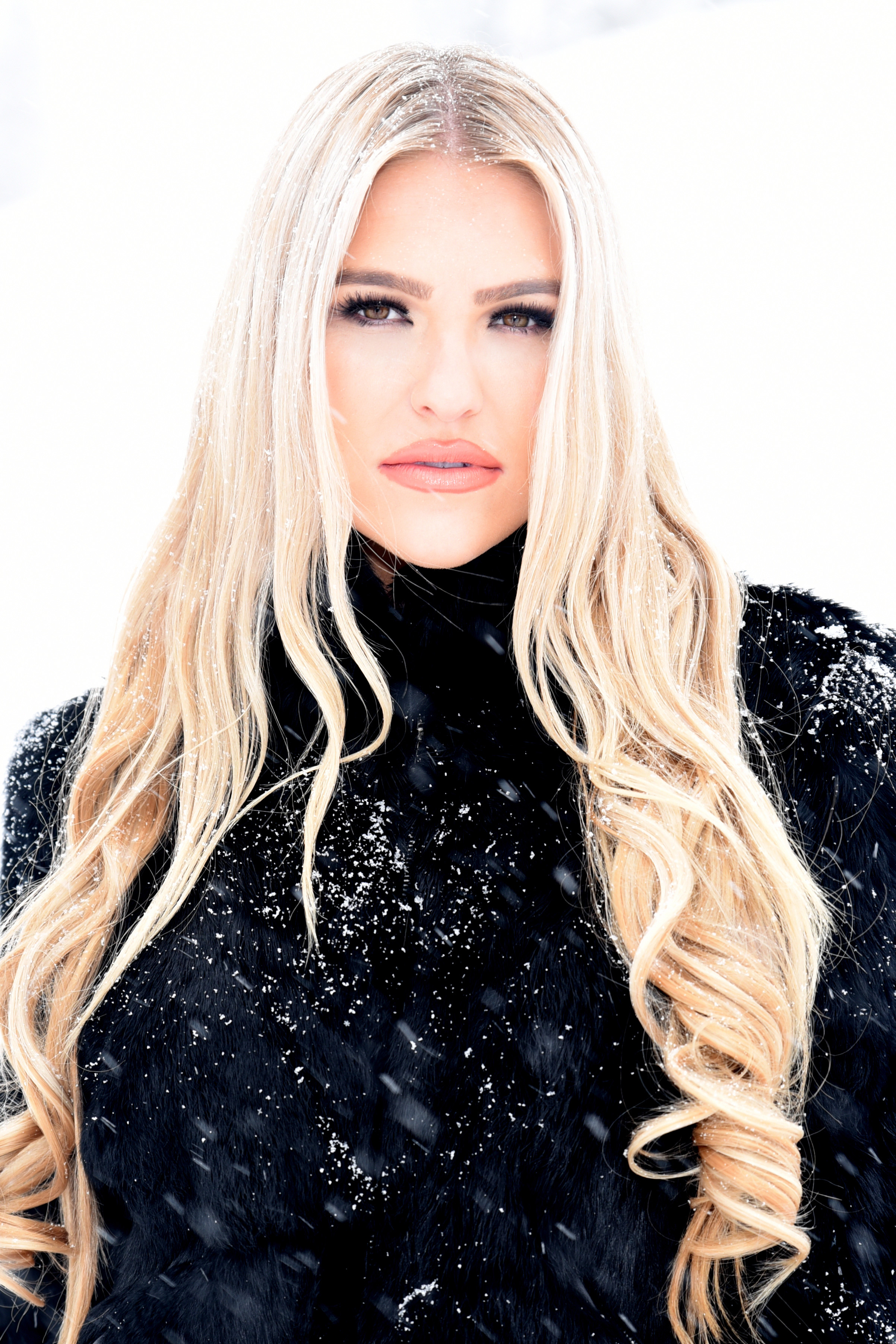
Toneata Morgan, Miss Oregon USA 2018 at the Sundance Film Festival

== Results summary ==
- 2nd runners-up: Gail Atchison (1976), Chantéa McIntyre (2025)
- Top 10: Debbie Epperson (1984), Endia Albrante (2001), Jennifer Murphy (2004)
- Top 11: Olga Calderon (1991)
- Top 15/16: Maralyn Turner (1956), Joyce Collin (1962), Toye Esch (1964), Maureen Bassett (1967), Laura Smith (1970), Toneata Morgan (2018)
- Oregon holds a record of 12 placements at Miss USA.

=== Awards ===
- Miss Congeniality: Denise White (1994), Gabrielle Neilan (2013)
- Miss Photogenic: Alaina Bergsma (2012)

== Winners ==
- Declared as Winner
- Ended as runner-up
- Ended as one of the finalists or semifinalists

Year	Name	Hometown	Age (Note: Age at the time of the Miss USA pageant)	Local title	Placement at Miss USA	Special awards at Miss USA	Notes
2026	Claire Wildey	Clovis, CA	24	Miss Clovis			
2025	Chantéa McIntyre	San Joaquin, CA	43	Miss San Joaquin Valley	2nd runner-up		
2024	Shayla Montgomery	Happy Valley	21	Miss Portland			Previously Miss Oregon Teen USA 2020; 1st runner-up at Miss Teen USA 2020
2023	Manju Bangalore	Corvallis	25	Miss Benton County			Previously Miss Oregon World 2018 and 2020, and Miss California World 2019; The longest reigning Miss Oregon USA
2022	Arielle Freytag	Harrisburg	28				
2021	Allison Cook	Portland	27				Previously Miss Oregon 2013
2020	Katerina Villegas	Hillsboro	26				
2019	Natalie Tonneson	Portland	28				
2018	Toneata Morgan	Coquille	22		Top 15		Contestant of Beauty and the Geek Australia
2017	Elizabeth (Liz) Denny	Roseburg	26				
2016	Natriana Shorter	Eugene	25				
2015	Bridget Wilmes	Canby	22				
2014	Emma Pelett	Portland	25				
2013	Gabrielle Neilan	Gresham	23			Miss Congeniality	
2012	Alaina Bergsma	Eugene	22			Miss Photogenic	Former member of the Oregon Ducks volleyball team and National Volleyball Player of the Year 2012
2011	Anna Prosser	Portland	26				Contestant at National Sweetheart 2008
2010	Kate Paul	Mitchell	24				
2009	Sylvie Tarpinian	Eugene	24				
2008	Mary Lee Horch	Corvallis	24				
2007	Sharitha McKenzie	Portland	23				
2006	Allison Machado	Medford	24				
2005	Jessica Carlson	Portland	24				Later represented Oregon at Miss International (US) 2009
2004	Jennifer Murphy	Medford	25		Top 10		Contestant on the fourth season of The Apprentice
2003	Myah Moore	Portland	21				
2002	Kristi Walkoski	Wilsonville	23				
2001	Endia Albrante	Eugene	21		Top 10		
2000	Elizabeth Mary "Liz" Heitmanek	Medford	19				
1999	Amy Nelson	Eugene	20				
1998	Kara Jones	Eugene	20				
1997	Heather Williams	Gold Beach	25				
1996	Jill Chartier	Roseburg	21				Previously Miss Oregon Teen USA 1993 and semi-finalist at Miss Teen USA 1993
1995	Karrie Grove	Portland	24				
1994	Denise White	Lake Oswego	25			Miss Congeniality	
1993	Dawn Kennedy	Lake Oswego	24				
1992	Terrie House	Astoria	22				
1991	Olga Calderon	Beaverton	22		Top 11		Previously Miss Oregon Teen USA 1985
1990	Elizabeth Michaud	Portland	24				
1989	Jenifer Blaska						
1988	Elaine Rohrer						
1987	Tamara Primiano	Portland					
1986	Kimberly Stubblefield	Lake Oswego	18				Later Mrs. Oregon America 2007 under her married name, Kimberly Takla; mother of Miss Oregon 2022 Sophia Takla
1985	Jodi Unruh	Eugene	20		Top 20		Later an award-winning TV anchor/reporter, entertainment host and producer
1984	Debbie Epperson	Portland	21		Semi-finalist		
1983	Shelley Kiser	Tigard	19				
1982	Kristina Bauer	Dundee	17				
1981	Dawn Lewis	Portland					
1980	Martha Viducich	Salem					
1979	Katie Fitzpatrick	Salem					
1978	Julie Ann Heater	Salem					
1977	Charisse Charlton						
1976	Gail Atchison				2nd runner-up		
1975	Theresa Favreau	Portland					
1974	Peggy Ann Gerding						
1973	Judy Bishop						
1972	Yvonne Philes						
1971	Connie Marie Oost	McMinnville	19				
1970	Laura Smith	Portland	18		Semi-finalist		
1969	Karen Morton						
1968	Marsha Mayer						
1967	Maureen Elizabeth Bassett	Beaverton	20		Top 15		Fourth runner-up at Miss Oregon 1965 and second runner-up at Miss Oregon 1966
1966	Sharon Gerritz						
1965	Leslie Brucher						
1964	Toye Esch	Salem			Semi-finalist		
1963	Joset Fisher						
1962	Joyce Collin				Semi-finalist		
1958–1961	did not compete						
1957	Sonja Landsem						
1956	Maralyn Turner				Semi-finalist		
1955	Rose Karcha						
1954	Charlotte Miller						
1953	did not compete						
1952	Beth Bailey						
