= Miss USA 2025 =

74th edition of the Miss USA competition

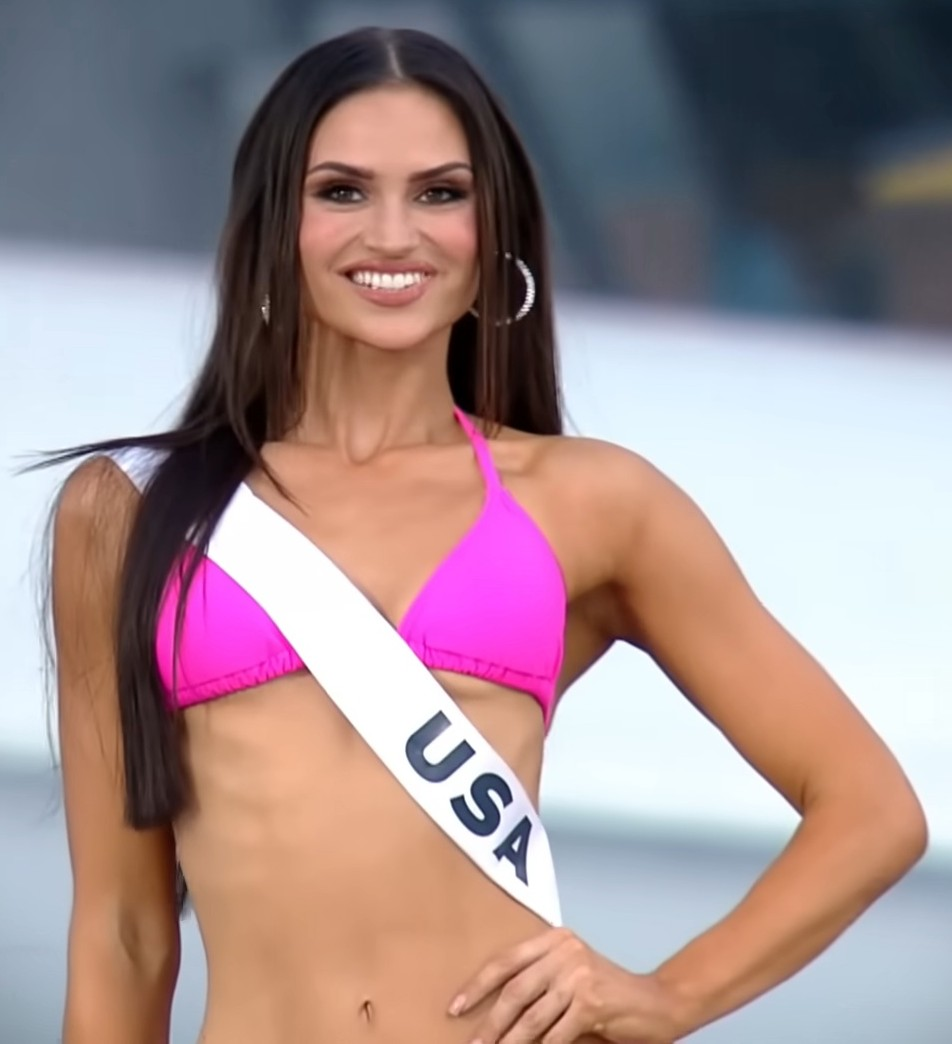
- Audrey Eckert
- Date: October 24, 2025
- Presenters: Olivia Jordan; Emmanuel Acho
- Venue: Grand Sierra Resort,Reno, Nevada
- Broadcaster: Queen Beauty Network
- Entrants: 51
- Placements: 20
- Winner: Audrey Eckert, Nebraska
- Congeniality: Tetra Shockley, Delaware
- Best State Costume: Shae Smith, Missouri
- Photogenic: Shelby Howell, Maine

Miss USA 2025 was the 74th Miss USA pageant, held at the Grand Sierra Resort in Reno, Nevada, on October 24, 2025. This marked the first edition under the direction of Thomas Brodeur, who acquired the franchise.

At the conclusion of the event, Miss Universe 2024, Victoria Kjær Theilvig, of Denmark crowned Audrey Eckert of Nebraska as Miss USA 2025. This was Nebraska's second Miss USA title and the first since 2018. She represented the United States at Miss Universe 2025, which took place on November 21, 2025, in Thailand November 20 in the United States, and placed in the Top 30. The outgoing titleholder, Alma Cooper from Michigan, did not attend the event for personal reasons, the first time since 1953 where the outgoing titleholder did not crown her immediate successor.

Contestants from fifty states and the District of Columbia competed in the competition. It was presented by Miss USA 2015, Olivia Jordan and Emmanuel Acho. For the first time since the pageant became independent from Miss Universe in 1965, the event was not televised on any major American television network. Instead, it was broadcast exclusively on the streaming provider Queen Beauty Network, and is the only event not to be aired on a broadcast television network. (Note: The exceptions were 2015, which was broadcast on cable channel Reelz after original broadcaster NBC withdrew due to uncertainties over then-owner Donald Trump following his candidacy as President of the United States, and 2020 to 2022, which were broadcast on cable channel fyi.)

== Background ==
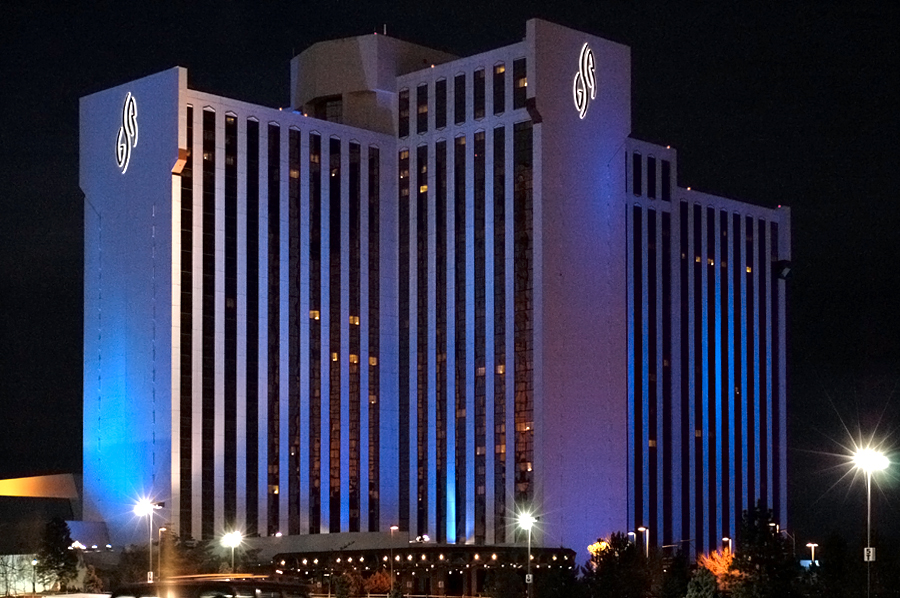
Grand Sierra Resort in Reno, Nevada, the host venue of Miss USA 2025

=== Location ===
On September 15, 2025, it was announced that the competition would take place at Grand Sierra Resort in Reno, Nevada. This was the fourth time that the pageant was held in Reno following Miss USA 2019, 2022 and 2023, and the third time in four years holding the pageant in the city, resumed its three-year deal had originally secured in 2022 under the ownership of then-national director and Miss USA 2008 Crystle Stewart.

=== Selection of contestants ===
As in the previous year, women over 28 were permitted to participate in the pageant.

The selection of contestants for the state pageants began in January 2025 and concluded in September 2025. The first state pageant took place in Connecticut on January 26, 2025, while the last state pageants were held in Alabama and Louisiana. These events, initially scheduled for September 21, 2025, were moved a day earlier to avoid coinciding with the open call deadline for the eight unrepresented states.

=== Appointed contestants ===
Several states in the competition could not hold traditional state pageants and instead appointed titleholders via an open casting call conducted by the national organization. These appointees had not won state competitions but were selected to ensure full national representation following leadership and licensing changes within the Miss USA Organization.

== Results ==
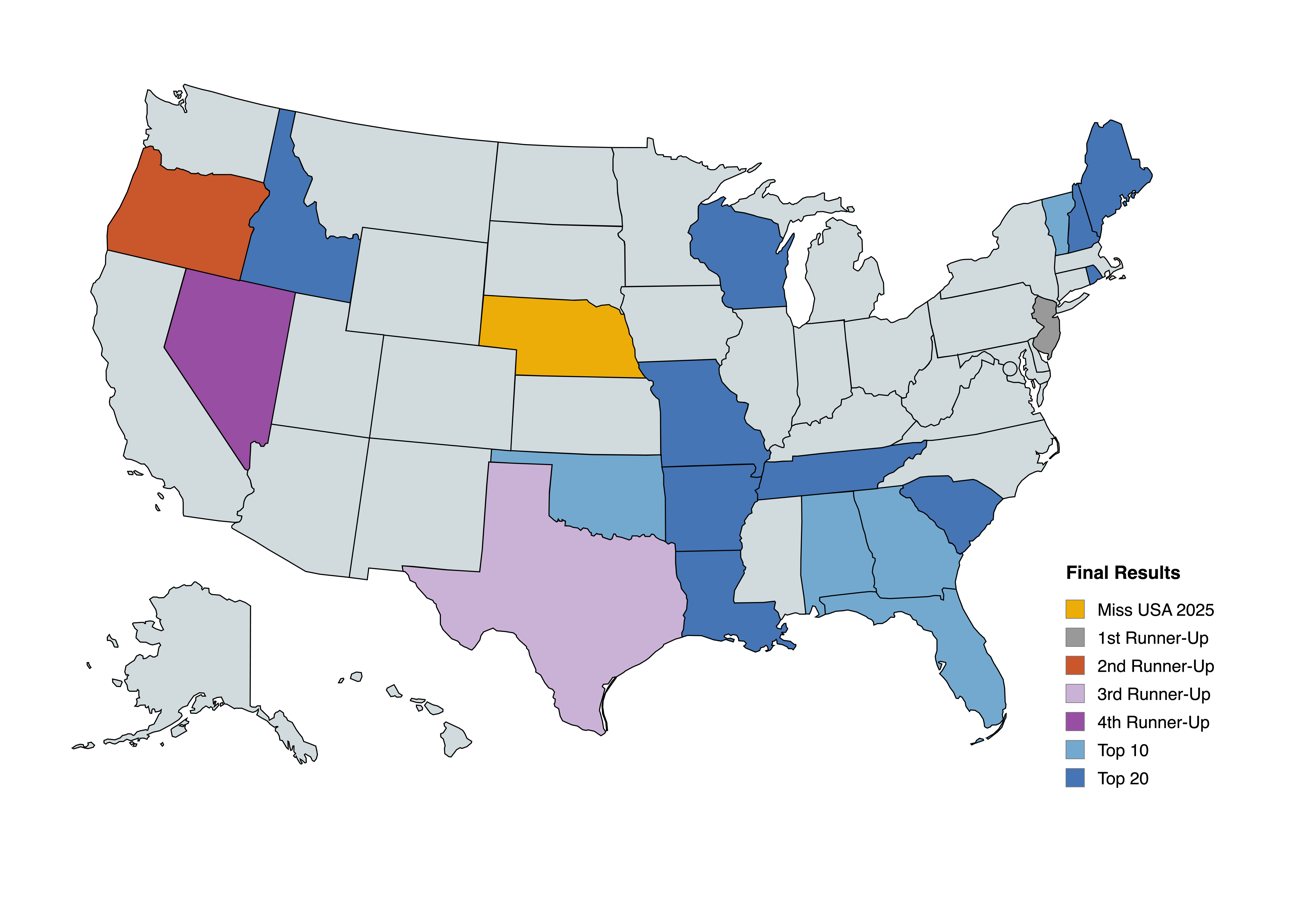
Miss USA 2025 results map, colors shaded in each state

=== Placements ===
Placement	Contestant
Miss USA 2025	Nebraska – Audrey Eckert
1st Runner-Up	New Jersey – Ivy Harrington
2nd Runner-Up	Oregon – Chantéa McIntyre
3rd Runner-Up	Texas – Taylor Lauren Davis
4th Runner-Up	Nevada – Mary Sickler
Top 10	Alabama – Kennedy Whisenant; Florida – Lou Schieffelin; (Georgia (U.S. state)) Georgia – Savannah Miles; Oklahoma – Zoe Ferraro; Vermont – Victoria Chuah
Top 20	Arkansas – Olivia Halsey^{§}; Idaho – Jenny Ting Crawford^{§}; Louisiana – Francie Millan; Maine – Shelby Howell; Missouri – Shae Smith; New Hampshire – Mona Lesa Brackett; Rhode Island – Brianna Vega^{§}; South Carolina – Gallienne Nabila^{§}; Tennessee – Madison Kunst; Wisconsin – Aneisha Cox

§ Voted into the Top 20 by viewers

=== Special awards ===
Award	Contestant
Miss Photogenic	Maine – Shelby Howell
Chelsi Smith Congeniality Award	Delaware – Tetra Shockley
Best in State Costume	Missouri – Shae Smith
Preliminary Best in Swimsuit	Nebraska – Audrey Eckert

== Pageant ==
=== Format ===
The process for determining the semi-finalists was similar to the previous one. The preliminary competition consisted of three segments: the swimsuit competition, the evening gown competition, and a closed-door interview. These identified the first 16 semi-finalists who advanced after the initial cut.

For the first time there was internet voting. The four contestants with the most votes automatically advanced to the semifinals.

Then, the remaining 20 semi-finalists participated in the swimsuit competition, from which 10 were selected to move forward. These 10 then competed in the evening gown competition, narrowing it down to five finalists. Finally, the five finalists faced the final question round, after which the winner of Miss USA 2025 and her runners-up were announced.

=== Judges ===
- Nia Sanchez — Miss USA 2014 from Nevada, first runner-up Miss Universe 2014
- Sasha Farber — Professional dancer and four-time finalist on Dancing with the Stars
- Jade Roper Tolbert — TV personality from The Bachelor and Bachelor in Paradise
- Hannah Edwards — Modelling scout for agencies including Elite, Next, and Wilhelmina
- Kenneth Barlis — Fashion designer and founder of the luxury brand Kenneth Barlis

== Contestants ==
Fifty-one contestants competed for the title.

State/District	Contestant	Age (Note: Ages at the time of the pageant)	Hometown	Notes
Alabama	Kennedy Whisenant	24	Birmingham	
Alaska	Kelsey Craft	34	Anchorage	Previously Miss International U.S. 2017
Arizona	Elexes Richardson	30	Scottsdale	
Arkansas	Olivia Halsey	25	Jonesboro	
California	Kylie Chang	21	Cupertino	
Colorado	Sydney Hella^{†}	26	Denver	Previously Miss Earth USA Air 2024; Crowned Miss Earth USA Air 2025; 3rd runner-up at Miss Minnesota USA 2025
Connecticut	Jenna Hofmann	24	Fairfield	
Delaware	Tetra Shockley	44	Camden	The oldest person to compete at Miss USA
District of Columbia	Allison LaForce	26	Washington, D.C.	Previously Miss Maryland’s Outstanding Teen 2016
Florida	Lou Schieffelin	25	Winter Park	Previously Miss Florida Teen USA 2018; Top 10 at Miss Teen USA 2018
Georgia	Savannah Miles	24	Atlanta	Previously Miss Georgia Teen USA 2018; Top 10 at Miss Teen USA 2018
Hawaii	Issha Rose Mata	30	Hilo	
Idaho	Jenny Ting Crawford^{†}	37	Huntington Beach, CA	1st runner-up at Miss California USA 2025
Illinois	Nikolina Vujcic	23	Des Plaines	Later Miss Universe Serbia 2026.
Indiana	Sydney Shrewsbury	24	Indianapolis	
Iowa	Hayley Buettell	27	Mediapolis	
Kansas	Asia Cymone Smith	26	Wichita	
Kentucky	Mattie Barker	22	Bowling Green	Previously Miss Kentucky Teen USA 2020
Louisiana	Francie Millan	23	New Orleans	
Maine	Shelby Howell	25	Bangor	
Maryland	Lexia Gillette	29	Chevy Chase	Miss Earth Massachusetts USA 2021
Massachusetts	Perianne Caron	26	Boston	
Michigan	Michele Lewandoski	23	Norton Shores	
Minnesota	Megan Rivera	25	Prior Lake	
Mississippi	McKenzie Cole	19	Vicksburg	Previously Miss Mississippi Teen USA 2022
Missouri	Shae Smith	22	Bolivar	Previously Miss Missouri's Outstanding Teen 2019; 4th runner-up at Miss America's Outstanding Teen 2020; Previously Miss Missouri Teen USA 2022
Montana	Juliana Wilson^{†}	36	Nashville, TN	1st runner-up at Miss Montana USA 2024
Nebraska	Audrey Eckert	23	Lincoln	Previously Miss Nebraska Teen USA 2020; 3rd runner-up at Miss Teen USA 2020
Nevada	Mary Sickler	23	Las Vegas	First woman to compete in Miss USA with alopecia Later 1st runner-up at Miss World America 2026; Represented United States at Miss World 2026
New Hampshire	Mona Lesa Brackett^{†}	36	New York City, NY	First woman to compete at Miss USA to wear a hijab and burkini 2nd runner-up at Miss New York USA 2025
New Jersey	Ivy Harrington	30	Neptune	
New Mexico	Dominique Ehrl Lugo (Note: Listed as Dominique Ehrl (under her maiden name))	31	Santa Fe	
New York	Christiana DiNardo	27	Rochester	
North Carolina	Lourdes Madera (Note: Listed as Lulu Madera)	39	Raleigh (Note: Permanent residency is at Fort Lee, New Jersey and her second home in Miami, Florida)	
North Dakota	Olivia Redding	21	Burlington	Youngest sister of Miss North Dakota USA 2019 Samantha Redding
Ohio	Hannah Klein	33	Cincinnati	
Oklahoma	Zoe Ferraro	25	Bixby	Previously Miss Oklahoma Teen USA 2018
Oregon	Chantéa McIntyre^{†}	43	San Joaquin, CA	Top 16 semifinalist at Miss California USA 2025
Pennsylvania	Rica Clements	29	York	
Rhode Island	Brianna Vega	29	Providence	
South Carolina	Gallienne Nabila	28	Greer (Note: Permanent residencies are at New York City and Los Angeles, California)	
South Dakota	Megan Hiykel	20	Brookings	
Tennessee	Madison Kunst	27	Nashville	
Texas	Taylor Lauren Davis	26	Dallas	
Utah	Elle Hinojosa	24	Salt Lake City	
Vermont	Victoria Chuah^{†}	25	Ashburn, VA	Previously Miss Virginia 2022; 4th runner-up at Miss Virginia USA 2025; Semifinalist at Miss New York USA 2025
Virginia	Erin Houston	27	Tysons	
Washington	Carisa Erickson^{†}	38	Seattle	Competed at Miss Arizona USA 2025
West Virginia	Erin Wellman	24	Princeton	
Wisconsin	Aneisha Cox	23	Green Bay	
Wyoming	Eilish Young^{†}	29	Spring, TX	Top 19 at Miss Texas USA 2025; 2nd runner-up at Miss West Virginia USA 2025

† The chosen delegate was appointed from an Open Casting Call
