= Miss New Hampshire USA =

Beauty pageant competition

- Formation: 1952
- Type: Beauty pageant
- Headquarters: Manchester
- Location: New Hampshire
- Members: Miss USA
- Official language: English
- Website: Official website

The Miss New Hampshire USA competition is the pageant that selects the representative for the state of New Hampshire in the Miss USA pageant. It was directed by The Clemente Organization based in Malden, Massachusetts from 2013 to 2019. GDB Theatre and Pageant Productions became the new directors for the event starting from 2020 competition.

New Hampshire has had little success at Miss USA, with the state's first placement being in 1962, becoming the fifth-to-last state has made its ever placement, and has only placed six times since then. New Hampshire's most recent placement was Mona Lesa Brackett in 2025.

Three Miss New Hampshire USA titleholders have previously competed at Miss Teen USA, one as Miss Connecticut Teen USA and three have competed at Miss America.

Samantha LaBonne of Southbury, CT was appointed Miss New Hampshire USA 2026 on June 30th, 2026 after the open casting call from Thomas Brodeur, the new owner of the national pageant. She will represent New Hampshire at Miss USA 2026.

== Results summary ==
=== Placements ===
- 1st runners-up: Bridget Vezina (2000)
- Top 12: Eva Dyer (1980), Camila Sacco (2022)
- Top 15/20: Sandralee Kay (1962), Vanessa Bissanti (2004), Mona Lesa Brackett (2025)

New Hampshire holds a record of 6 placements at Miss USA.

=== Awards ===
- Miss Congeniality: Diane Gadoury (1984)

== Winners ==
Color key

- Declared as Winner
- Ended as runner-up
- Ended as one of the finalists or semifinalists

Year	Name	Hometown	Age (Note: Age at the time of the Miss USA pageant)	Local title	Placement at Miss USA	Special awards at Miss USA	Notes
2026	Samantha LaBonne	Southbury, CT	34	Miss Southbury			Previously Miss Connecticut Teen USA 2011 under her maiden name Samantha Sojka
2025	Mona Lesa Brackett	New York City, NY	36	Miss Kings County	Top 20		
2024	Ariel Sullivan	Portsmouth	28	Miss SeaCoast			
2023	Britney Lane	Hooksett	26	Miss Hooksett			
2022	Camila Sacco	Portsmouth	27	Miss Portsmouth	Top 12		Born in Paraguay
2021	Taylor Fogg	Newbury	26				
2020	Alyssa Fernandes	Merrimack	25				1st runner-up at Miss New Hampshire's Outstanding Teen 2011 pageant; Longest reigning Miss New Hampshire USA at 1 year, 6 months and 5 days
2019	Alexis Chinn	Pembroke	21				Contestant of Miss Earth United States 2016
2018	Michelle McEwan	Harrisville	25				Born in Thailand
2017	Sarah Mousseau	Stratham	26				
2016	Jessica Strohm	Manchester	24				New England Patriots Cheerleader
2015	Samantha Sue Poirier	Dover	23				
2014	Bridget Brunet	South Hampton	26				
2013	Amber Faucher	Manchester	22	Miss Manchester			Previously Miss New Hampshire Teen USA 2009
2012	Ryanne Harms	Rochester	23	Miss Lilac City			
2011	LacyJane Folger	Farmington	22				
2010	Nicole Houde	Manchester	23				
2009	Christy Dunn	Laconia	25				
2008	Breanne Silvi	Nashua	23				
2007	Laura Silva	Londonderry	19				
2006	Krystal Barry	Belmont	20				
2005	Candace Glickman	Manchester	23				Previously Miss New Hampshire 2003, top 10 at Miss America 2004
2004	Vanessa Bissanti	Manchester	21		Semi-finalist		
2003	Rachael Kay Ribeck	Manchester	24				
2002	Audra Paquette	Merrimack	21				Later Miss New Hampshire 2005
2001	Melissa Anne Robbins	Manchester	24				
2000	Bridget Jane Vezina	Manchester	19		1st runner-up		
1999	Melissa MacLaughlin	Manchester	18				
1998	Nadia Semerdjiev	Manchester	23				
1997	Gretchen Durgin	Lancaster	21				Previously Miss New Hampshire Teen USA 1993
1996	Julie Minta Gleneck	Manchester	21				
1995	Valerie Gosselin	Manchester	22				
1994	Kelly Zarse	Manchester	19				
1993	Heidi Cambra	Hampstead	25				
1992	Rebecca Lee Lake	Manchester	26				
1991	Adriana Molinari	Manchester	20				Stripped her crown when a tabloid revealed that she had been a stripper.
1990	Lisa Parnpichate	Manchester	23				
1989	Fayleen Anne Chwalek	Manchester	24				
1988	Diane Lynn Wright	Manchester	22				
1987	Laurie Durkee	Hampton Beach	21				
1986	Lynda Mary Poulin	Durham	24				
1985	Janice LaCroix	Manchester	25				
1985	Rhonda Niles	Manchester	20		did not compete		Resigned four days after she was arrested for receiving stolen clothes.
1984	Diane Gadoury	Hampstead	26			Miss Congeniality	
1983	Lynn Stockwell	Hampton	23				
1982	Kathy Rogers	Seabrook					
1981	Cynthia Leigh Graves	North Conway					
1980	Eva Dyer	Amherst			Top 12		
1979	Patricia Brous	Peterborough					
1978	Barbara Miller						
1977	Belinda Bridgeman	Merrimack					Later Miss New Hampshire 1978; Mother of Miss New Hampshire Teen USA 2004 - Brittany Freeman
1976	Sinceree Rowlette						
1975	Bonnie Gates	Salem					
1974	June Tedeschi						
1973	Grace Knox						
1972	Cathy Davis						
1971	Jane Laroche						
1970	Gale Eriksson	Concord					
1969	Dorothy Conners						
1968	Deborah Steers						
1967	Jennifer Brown						
1966	Elaine Brandt						
1965	Kathryn Pines	Hollis	22				
1964	Beverly Ann Hebert						
1963	Janny McCloud						
1962	Sandralee Kay				Semi-finalist		
1961	Ellen Lipson						
1960	Joan Joyce Chesleing						
1959	Nancy Jeanne Gray						
1958	Patricia Gail Larrabee						
1957	Lyla Moran						
1956	Rita Leclerc	Berlin	21				
1955	Patricia Ann Mowry						
1954	Myrna Louise Smith						
1953	Muriel Roy						
1952	Did Not Compete						
