= Miss Nebraska USA =

Beauty pageant competition

- Formation: 1952
- Type: Beauty pageant
- Headquarters: Shawnee
- Location: Kansas
- Members: Miss USA
- Official language: English
- Key people: John M. Vannatta; Jason Vannatta; Jennifer Vannatta-Fisher, State Pageant Director
- Website: Official website

The Miss Nebraska USA competition is the pageant that selects the representative for the state Nebraska in the Miss USA pageant. The pageant is directed by Vanbros & Associates, headquartered in Shawnee, Kansas. In 2002, Nebraska joined the Vanbros group of state pageants for the Miss USA and Teen USA system.

Nebraska is one of the least successful states at Miss USA, having only placed 15 times. They were most successful in the 1950s, placing 6 times, with three runner up placements. Until 2018, their highest placement was in 1955 which was 2nd runner up. Belinda Wright's top 15 placement in 2010 was Nebraska's first semi-final placement since 1980 and first to win Miss Congeniality. In 2018, Sarah Rose Summers became the first Miss Nebraska USA to win Miss USA and becoming the 35th state to have the title of Miss USA for the first time. The most recent placement was Audrey Eckert winning the second title for her state.

In 2020, Megan Swanson became the first Miss Nebraska delegate to ever win the state title. Also, she and her sister Allie Swanson, Miss Nebraska 2019, became the first sisters to hold the statewide Miss USA and Miss America titleholders simultaneously.

Audrey Eckert of Lincoln was crowned Miss Nebraska USA 2025 on April 6, 2025 at The Garden Theater in Omaha. She represented Nebraska for the title of Miss USA 2025, and subsequently won the title.

The current titleholder is Emily Lenser of Arapahoe who was crowned Miss Nebraska USA 2026 on June 28, 2026, at The Garden Theater in Omaha. She will represent Nebraska at Miss USA 2026.

== Gallery ==
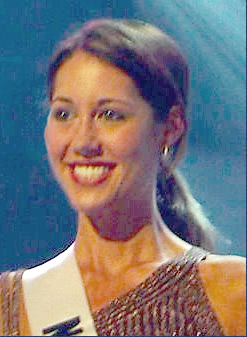
Guerin Austin, Miss Nebraska USA 2004

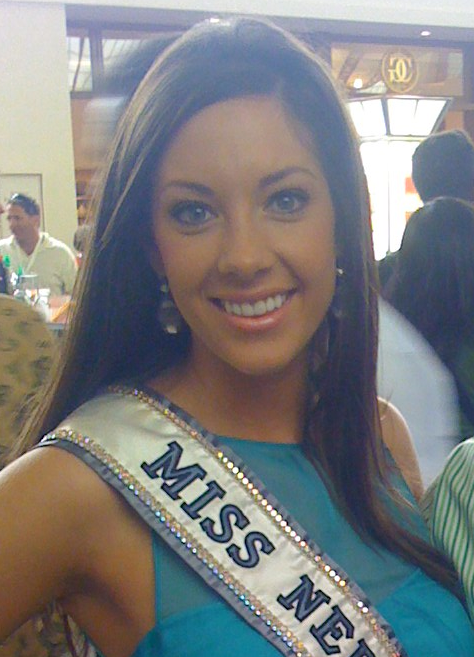
Micaela Johnson, Miss Nebraska USA 2008

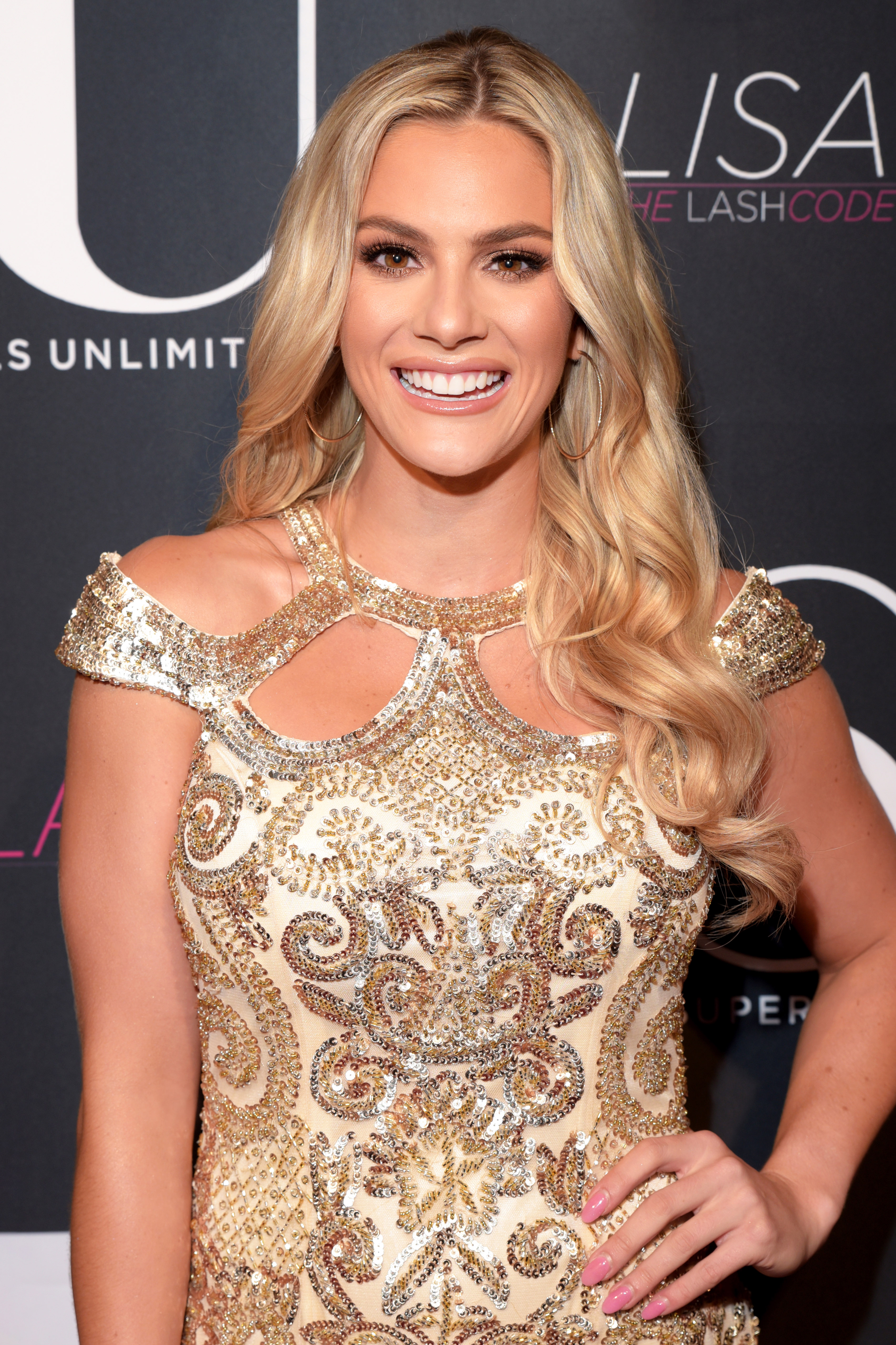
Sarah Rose Summers, Miss Nebraska USA 2018, Miss Nebraska Teen USA 2012 & Miss USA 2018

== Results summary ==
=== Placements ===
- Miss USA: Sarah Rose Summers (2018), Audrey Eckert (2025)
- 2nd runners-up: Donna Jo Streever (1955), Natalie Pieper (2022)
- 3rd runners-up: Shari Lewis (1956), Carolyn McGirr (1957)
- Top 10: Emily Lenser (2026)
- Top 12: Janice Geiler (1973), Rebecca "Becky" Staab (1980)
- Top 15/16/19/20: Berneta Nelson (1953), Margie Winkhoff (1954), Dee Kjeldgaard (1958), Gail Weinstock (1961), Belinda Wright (2010), Amanda Soltero (2014), Erika Etzelmiller (2021)

Nebraska holds a record of 16 placements at Miss USA.

=== Awards ===
- Miss Photogenic: Janice Geiler (1973)
- Honorable Mention: Stacey Skidmore (2002)
- Miss Congeniality: Belinda Wright (2010)
- Best in Swimsuit: Audrey Eckert (2025)

== Winners ==
Color key

- Declared as Winner
- Ended as runner-up
- Ended as one of the finalists or semifinalists

Year	Name	Hometown	Age (Note: Age at the time of the Miss USA pageant)	Local title	Placement at Miss USA	Special awards at Miss USA	Notes
2026	Emily Lenser	Arapahoe	25	Miss West Omaha	Top 10		
2025	Samantha Washington	Lincoln	27	Miss South Lincoln	did not compete		Originally first runner-up; assumed the title when Audrey Eckert won Miss USA; Previously Miss Nebraska Teen USA 2017; Previously Miss Nebraska's Outstanding Teen 2013
2025	Audrey Jolynn Eckert	Lincoln	23	Miss Lincoln	Miss USA 2025	Best in Swimsuit	Top 30 semifinalist at Miss Universe 2025; Previously Miss Nebraska Teen USA 2020; 3rd Runner-Up at Miss Teen USA 2020
2024	Kamryn "Kami" Buchanan	Lincoln	24	Miss South Lincoln			
2023	Amelia "Mimi" Wood	Omaha	23	Miss West Omaha			
2022	Natalie Pieper	Lincoln	26	Miss Douglas County	2nd runner-up		
2021	Erika Etzelmiller	Lincoln	23	Miss South Lincoln	Top 16		Previously Miss Nebraska Teen USA 2016
2020	Megan Swanson	Omaha	26	Miss Millard			Previously Miss Nebraska 2014; Sister of Allie Swanson, Miss Nebraska 2019
2019	Alexis "Lex" Nicole Najarian	Lincoln	23	Miss Capital City			Daughter of Peter Najarian
2018	Breanna "Bree" Coffey	Valley	24	Miss Valley	did not compete		Originally first runner-up; assumed the title when Sarah Rose Summers won Miss USA; Later competed in Miss Nebraska USA 2020, placed in semifinals
2018	Sarah Rose Summers	Omaha	23	Miss Omaha	Miss USA 2018		Previously National American Junior Miss 2010; Previously Miss Nebraska Teen USA 2012; Top 20 semifinalist at Miss Universe 2018
2017	Jasmine Jade Fuelberth	Norfolk	20	Miss Norfolk			Previously Miss Nebraska Teen USA 2013; Awarded Miss Congeniality at Miss Teen USA 2013
2016	Sarah Elizabeth Hollins	Omaha	25	Miss North Douglas County			Previously Miss Nebraska Teen USA 2009; Appeared on We TV Obsessed with the Dress
2015	Hoang-Kim Cung	Grand Island	23	Miss Grand Island			Previously National American Miss 2012–2013
2014	Amanda Soltero	Columbus	22	Miss East Lincoln	Top 20		Previously Miss Nebraska Teen USA 2010
2013	Ellie Lorenzen	Omaha	21	Miss Omaha			
2012	Amy Marie Spilker	Malcolm	21	Miss Malcolm			
2011	Haley Jo Herold	Omaha	23	Miss Greater Omaha			
2010	Belinda Renee Wright	Scotia	21	Miss Greeley County	Top 15	Miss Congeniality	
2009	Meagan Winings	Atkinson	22	Miss Sandhills			Previously Miss Nebraska Teen USA 2004; Top 10 finalist at Miss Teen USA 2004 First Miss Nebraska Teen USA to make the semifinals at Miss Teen USA.
2008	Micaela Johnson	Omaha	23	Miss Douglas County			Dallas Cowboys Cheerleaders Squad Member 2003-2005
2007	Geneice Wilcher	Omaha	26	Miss North Omaha			
2006	Emily Poeschl	Lincoln	21	Miss Lincoln			
2005	Jana Murrell	Omaha	23				
2004	Guerin Austin	Omaha	24				
2003	Jessica Perea	Omaha	22				First Latina to win title
2002	Stacey Skidmore	Omaha	19			Honorable Mention	
2001	Su Joing Drakeford	Bellevue	23				USAF Airman 1995–1999, Miss Teen Omaha 1996, Later Mrs. Maryland 2015
2000	Valerie Cook	Omaha	25				
1999	WaLynda Lou Sipple						Previously Miss Michigan Teen USA 1992; Mother of Miss Nebraska Teen USA 2024 Maggie Wadginski
1998	Jennifer Naro						
1997	Kimberly Jane Weir	Lincoln	21				
1996	Kerry Lynn Kemper		24				
1995	Chandelle Peacock	Omaha					
1994	Shawn Wolff						
1993	Tish Gade	Lincoln					
1992	Jeanna Margaret Blom						
1991	Ziba Ayeen						Native of Afghanistan
1990	Angela Humphrey						
1989	Renee Harter						
1988	Kellie O'Neil						
1987	Amy Anderson	Kearney					
1986	Ellen Withrow	Papillion					
1985	Lori Leigh Straight	Omaha					
1984	Joan Marie "Joni" Rundall	Omaha					
1983	Penelope Boynton	Lincoln					
1982	Lori Lynn Novicki	Omaha					
1981	Ladonna Hill	Seward					
1980	Rebecca Ann "Becky" Staab	Ralston	18		Top 12		Played Jessie Matthews on Guiding Light
1979	Rhonda Lundberg	McCook					
1978	Shari Alyce Reimers						
1977	Deb Ridge	Hastings					
1976	Catherine Fricke						
1975	Mary Lee Hoth	Omaha					
1974	Mary Wolff						
1973	Janice Elaine Geiler	Ralston	21		Top 12	Miss Photogenic	
1972	Theresa Engels						
1971	Lola Butler						
1970	Mary Bonneau "Bonnie" McElveen	Bellevue					
1969	Marily Poole						
1968	Linda J. Dresher						
1967	Cheryl "Cherrie" Moore	Omaha	18				
1966	Karen Weinfurtner	Omaha					
1965	Constance Lynne "Connee" Kellogg						
1964	Georgia Ann Merriam						
1963	Sandy S. Zimmer						
1962	No Representative						
1961	Gail Weinstock				Semi-Finalist		
1960	No Representative						
1959	Priscilla Eckrish						
1958	Dee Kjeldgaard				Semi-Finalist		
1957	Carolyn McGirr				3rd Runner-Up		Finished as 4th runner-up, but succeeded to 3rd runner-up when the 3rd runner-up took the place of the 2nd runner-up
1956	Shari Lewis				3rd Runner-Up		
1955	Donna Jo Streever				2nd Runner-Up		
1954	Margie Winkhoff				Semi-Finalist		
1953	Berneta Nelson				Semi-Finalist		
1952	No representative						
