= Adriana Molinari =

American actress

- Born: 26 November 1967 (age 58); Buenos Aires, Argentina
- Other name: Alex Taylor
- Occupations: Beauty pageant winner; model; exotic dancer; pornographic actress
- Height: 5 ft 3 in (1.60 m)
- Beauty pageant titleholder
- Title: Miss Hampton Beach, New Hampshire in 1984; Miss Teen All-American New Hampshire in 1985; Miss Petite New Hampshire in 1987; Miss Latin USA in 1989; Miss New Hampshire USA in 1991
- Hair color: Blond
- Eye color: Brown
- Major competition: Miss USA 1991

Adriana Molinari (born 26 November 1967), known professionally as Alex Taylor, is a former beauty pageant winner, model, exotic dancer, and pornographic actress who mainly worked for Vivid Entertainment from around 1998 to 2000.

== Early life ==
She moved to Hampton, New Hampshire from South America with her parents when she was in seventh grade. She was a bathing suit model for a time as a teenager. She is a graduate of Winnacunnet High School.

== Career ==
Molinari was named Miss Hampton Beach, New Hampshire in 1984 and Miss New Hampshire USA in 1991. She started stripping in 1990 in Massachusetts and failed to place in the 1991 Miss USA pageant. In the Spring of 1991, Miss USA pageant officials stripped her of her crown when a national supermarket tabloid publicly revealed that she had been moonlighting as an exotic dancer, which was against pageant rules.

She was a Penthouse Pet in August 1994 under the stage name Alex Taylor and appeared in that adult magazine over thirty times. She has also appeared on the TV shows A Current Affair, Hard Copy, Inside Edition, and Entertainment Tonight.

== Personal life ==
As of 2008, Molinari had retired from the adult industry and was residing in Orlando, Florida.
