= Miss Teen USA 2020 =

38th edition of the Miss Teen USA competition

- Date: November 7, 2020
- Presenters: Allie LaForce; Cheslie Kryst
- Venue: Graceland, Memphis, Tennessee
- Broadcaster: Facebook; PlayStation Network; YouTube
- Entrants: 51
- Placements: 16
- Winner: Kiʻilani Arruda; Hawaii

Miss Teen USA 2020 was the 38th Miss Teen USA pageant. Originally scheduled to be held in spring 2020, the competition was postponed indefinitely due to the COVID-19 pandemic. It was later rescheduled for November 7, 2020, at the Exhibition Centre and the Soundstage at Graceland in Memphis, Tennessee. Kaliegh Garris of Connecticut crowned Ki'ilani Arruda of Hawaii as her successor at the end of the event. The competition was hosted by Allie LaForce and Miss USA 2019 Cheslie Kryst.

The competition marked the first year that a new crown made by luxury jeweler Mouawad was used at Miss Teen USA, effectively retiring the Mikimoto Crown.

For a third consecutive year, the competition was held concurrently alongside the Miss USA competition. This was the last Miss Teen USA to be organized by Miss Universe Organization before being split into its separate organization beginning in Miss Teen USA 2021.

== Background ==
=== Location ===
On August 30, 2020, Graceland announced on their schedule that the competition would be held on November 7 on their premises in Memphis, Tennessee. The MUO later confirmed that the competition will be hosted at Graceland the following day.

This was the first time the competition has been hosted in Tennessee since Miss Teen USA 1984 was also held in Memphis.

=== Hosts ===
On October 22, it was announced that the competition would be hosted by Allie LaForce and Cheslie Kryst. LaForce formerly was crowned Miss Teen USA 2005, and has worked as a sports reporter for Fox and Turner Sports, while Kryst was crowned Miss USA 2019 and serves as a correspondent for Extra.

=== Selection of contestants ===
51 delegates from the 50 states and the District of Columbia are selected in state pageants which began in September 2019 and ended in February 2020.

== Results ==
=== Placements ===
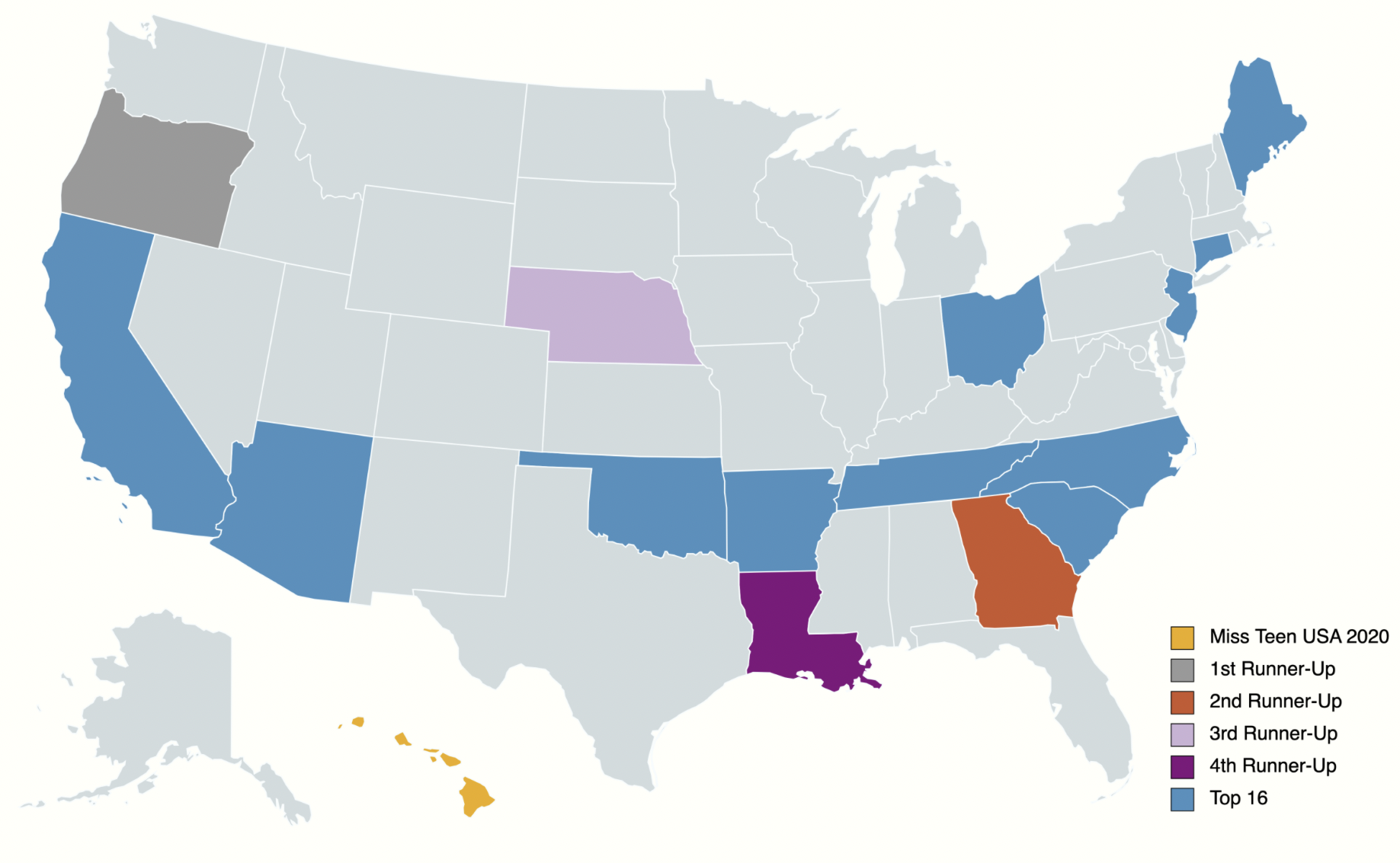
Miss Teen USA 2020 results.

| Placement | Contestant |
|---|---|
| Miss Teen USA 2020 | Hawaii — Kiʻilani Arruda |
| 1st Runner-Up | Oregon — Shayla Montgomery |
| 2nd Runner-Up | Georgia — Shayla Jackson |
| 3rd Runner-Up | Nebraska — Audrey Eckert |
| 4th Runner-Up | Louisiana — Sydney Taylor |
| Top 16 | Arizona — Molly Schwanz; Arkansas — Anna Claire Hay; California — Zoe Hunt; Connecticut — Samantha Sarelli; Maine — Grace Morey; New Jersey — JaeLynn Polanco; North Carolina — Peyton Brown; Ohio — Lily McLaughlin; Oklahoma — Danika Christopherson; South Carolina — Gracen Grainger; Tennessee — Ansley Ecker |

== Pageant ==
=== Preliminary round ===
Prior to the final competition, the delegates competed the preliminary competition, which the judges and a presentation show where they competed in swim wear and evening gown. It was held on November 6 at Graceland Exhibition Center and the Soundstage in Memphis and hosted by Kryst and Garris.

=== Broadcasting ===
The pageant was livestreamed on the Miss Universe Organization's social media channels and on PlayStation 4 consoles as a live event on the U.S. PlayStation Store, while an encore presentation of the pageant was available via catch-up from November 12–15.

=== Judges ===
- Danielle Doty Fitzgerald – Miss Teen USA 2011 from Texas
- Sara Echeagaray – social media personality and TikToker
- Nia Franklin – Miss America 2019 from New York
- K. Lee Graham – Miss Teen USA 2014 from South Carolina
- Iman Oubou – scientist, entrepreneur, and medical missionary

== Contestants ==
State or district titleholders were:

| State | Contestant | Age (Note: Ages at the time of the pageant) | Hometown | Placement | Notes |
|---|---|---|---|---|---|
| Alabama | Katie Watts | 15 | Mobile | | |
| Alaska | Jadyn Fraser | 19 | Fairbanks | | |
| Arizona | Molly Schwanz | 19 | Scottsdale | Top 16 | |
| Arkansas | Anna Claire Hay | 17 | Siloam Springs | Top 16 | Later Miss Arkansas USA 2026 |
| California | Zoe Hunt | 18 | Coronado | Top 16 | |
| Colorado | Yashi Uppalapati | 18 | Colorado Springs | | |
| Connecticut | Samantha Sarelli | 18 | Westport | Top 16 | Later Semi-finalist at Miss Connecticut USA 2023 |
| Delaware | Samantha Repass | 19 | Lewes | | |
| District of Columbia | Sydney Jackson | 19 | Clinton, MD | | |
| Florida | Rylie Spicker | 19 | Fort Myers | | |
| Georgia | Shayla Jackson | 18 | Valdosta | 2nd Runner-Up | |
| Hawaii | Kiʻilani Arruda | 18 | Kapaʻa | Miss Teen USA 2020 | |
| Idaho | Sabrina Ripley | 19 | Boise | | |
| Illinois | Victoria Rhemrev | 18 | Long Grove | | The first Miss Illinois Teen USA of Indonesian descent. |
| Indiana | Jinnie Tomes | 19 | Fishers | | |
| Iowa | Hailey Parton | 18 | West Des Moines | | |
| Kansas | Cyara Heredia Ruiz | 19 | Liberal | | |
| Kentucky | Mattie Barker | 18 | Bowling Green | | Later Miss Kentucky USA 2025 |
| Louisiana | Sydney Taylor | 19 | Livingston | 4th Runner-Up | Later Miss Louisiana USA 2024 |
| Maine | Grace Morey | 17 | Deer Isle | Top 16 | |
| Maryland | Heavyn McDaniels | 18 | Silver Spring | | |
| Massachusetts | Annika Sharma | 19 | Newton | | Later Miss Massachusetts USA 2023 |
| Michigan | Aneesa Sheikh | 18 | Bloomfield Hills | | Later Miss Grand Pakistan 2022 |
| Minnesota | Gwendolyn Buchanan | 19 | Duluth | | |
| Mississippi | Zoe Bigham | 18 | Maben | | |
| Missouri | Holly McDowell | 16 | Lee's Summit | | |
| Montana | Morgan Pierce | 17 | Lewistown | | |
| Nebraska | Audrey Eckert | 18 | Lincoln | 3rd Runner-Up | Later Miss Nebraska USA 2025 and Miss USA 2025 |
| Nevada | Montana Cencarik | 18 | Las Vegas | | |
| New Hampshire | Samantha Lemay | 17 | Deerfield | | |
| New Jersey | JaeLynn Polanco | 16 | Bergenfield | Top 16 | |
| New Mexico | Isabella Bizzell | 18 | Los Lunas | | |
| New York | Maya Dominguez | 18 | Yonkers | | |
| North Carolina | Peyton Brown | 19 | Dunn | Top 16 | |
| North Dakota | Amanda Higginbotham | 19 | Grand Forks | | Later 1st runner-up at Miss North Dakota 2022 |
| Ohio | Lily McLaughlin | 18 | Zanesville | Top 16 | |
| Oklahoma | Danika Christopherson | 19 | Lawton | Top 16 | Later Miss Oklahoma USA 2024 |
| Oregon | Shayla Montgomery | 18 | Portland | 1st Runner-Up | Later Miss Oregon USA 2024 |
| Pennsylvania | Kiara Lin | 18 | Cranberry Township | | |
| Rhode Island | Sofia Ledoux | 17 | Cranston | | |
| South Carolina | Gracen Grainger | 19 | Hamer | Top 16 | Later Miss South Carolina USA 2024 |
| South Dakota | Izabel Kreger | 18 | Canton | | |
| Tennessee | Ansley Ecker | 19 | Atoka | Top 16 | |
| Texas | Anissa Mendez | 18 | Laredo | | |
| Utah | Brooklyn Baton | 19 | Brigham City | | |
| Vermont | Kiera Pipeling | 18 | West Rutland | | |
| Virginia | Amya Caldwell | 16 | Ashburn | | |
| Washington | Marianne Bautista | 18 | Renton | | |
| West Virginia | Sophia Martino | 19 | Bridgeport | | |
| Wisconsin | Olivia Lulich | 18 | Lyndon Station | | Later Miss Wisconsin USA 2026 |
| Wyoming | Baylee Drewry | 17 | Greybull | | Later Miss Wyoming 2024 |
