= Justus Kelley =

American beauty pageant titleholder

- Born: Justus Kelley; Arlington, Virginia, United States
- Education: Indiana University (BS; MS)
- Beauty pageant titleholder
- Title: Miss Virginia USA 2026; Miss USA 2026
- Major competitions: Miss USA 2026 (Winner); Miss Universe 2026; (TBD)

Justus Kelley is an American beauty pageant titleholder who won Miss USA 2026, representing Virginia. It was the state's first title in 56 years. She was also the first married mother, and first woman in her 30s to win. She will represent the United States at Miss Universe 2026 in Puerto Rico.

== Early life and education ==
Justus Kelley was born and raised in Arlington, Virginia. She graduated from Cathedral High School in Indianapolis in 2013 before attending Indiana University, where she received a Bachelor of Science in Community Health and a Master of Science in Public Health Administration. During her time at Indiana University, she served as chapter president of Alpha Kappa Alpha.

== Career ==
Kelley began her career with the Make-A-Wish Foundation, working in its Kentucky, Indiana, and Ohio division after completing her master's degree. In 2021, she moved to Virginia and became a regional development officer at the foundation's Blue Ridge division. She later joined St. Jude Children's Research Hospital, where she is a senior philanthropic advisor. Kelley is also the founder of Foster Footprints, a nonprofit organization supporting foster children in the Washington metropolitan area.

== Pageantry ==
While an undergraduate student, Kelley won Miss Indiana University. She won Miss Virginia USA 2026 on July 18, 2026, and then representing Virginia, won Miss USA 2026, on August 27, 2026, at the Adrienne Arsht Center for the Performing Arts in Miami, Florida. She also won the Best in Swimsuit award, and was crowned by her predecessor, Audrey Eckert of Nebraska. She became the first mother and married woman to win the title, three years after the Miss USA organization began allowing mothers and women above 28 to compete. She was also the third woman from Virginia to win Miss USA following Wendy Dascomb in 1969 and Deborah Shelton in 1970. Kelley will represent the United States at Miss Universe 2026 in Puerto Rico in November 2026.

Awards and achievements
Preceded by Audrey Eckert, Nebraska	Miss USA; 2026	Incumbent
Preceded by Erin Houston	Miss Virginia USA; 2026	Succeeded by Alexia Andrachik
