= Audrey Eckert =

Miss USA 2025

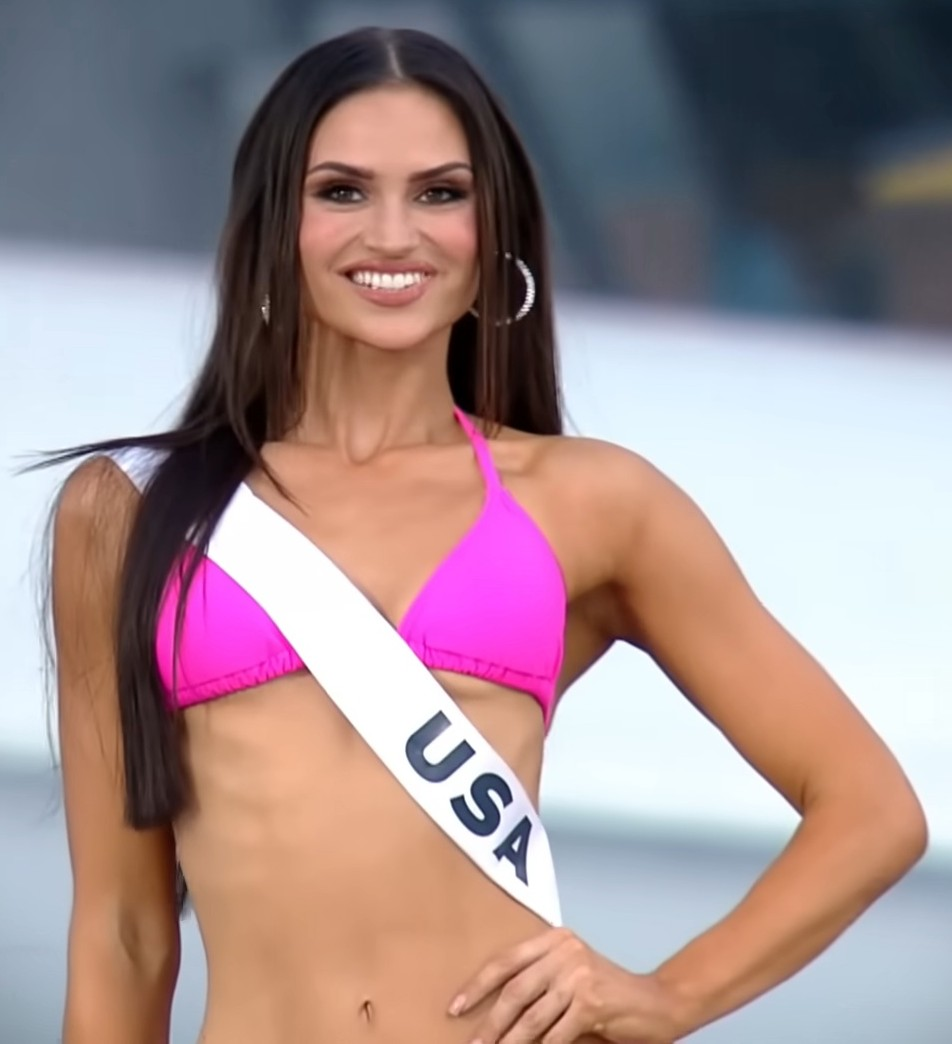
- Eckert at Miss Universe 2025
- Born: Audrey Jolynn Eckert; May 20, 2002 (age 24); Lincoln, Nebraska, U.S.
- Education: University of Nebraska–Lincoln (BSBA)
- Beauty pageant titleholder
- Title: Miss Nebraska Teen USA 2020; Miss Nebraska USA 2025; Miss USA 2025
- Major competitions: Miss Teen USA 2020; (3rd Runner-Up); Miss USA 2025; (Winner); Miss Universe 2025; (Top 30)

Audrey Jolynn Eckert (born May 20, 2002) is an American beauty pageant titleholder who was crowned Miss USA 2025. She had previously won Miss Nebraska USA 2025 and Miss Nebraska Teen USA 2020, and placed as the third runner-up at Miss Teen USA 2020. After winning Miss USA, she became the second entrant representing Nebraska to win the title. Eckert represented the United States at Miss Universe 2025 and placed in the Top 30.

== Early life and education ==
Eckert was born in Lincoln, Nebraska, and attended the University of Nebraska–Lincoln. She graduated with a Bachelor of Science in Business Administration degree with a specialization in marketing and also was the captain of the Husker Cheer Squad. Prior to winning Miss USA, Eckert worked as a social media and marketing coordinator for the Thai handbag brand Sapahn.

== Pageantry ==
In 2020, Eckert won the Miss Nebraska Teen USA title. She went on to compete at Miss Teen USA 2020 in November 2020, and placed as the third runner-up behind winner Kiʻilani Arruda of Hawaii.

=== Miss USA 2025 ===
Eckert returned to pageantry in 2025, and won the Miss Nebraska USA 2025 title. As Miss Nebraska USA, Eckert won the right to represent the state at Miss USA 2025. The competition was held on October 24, 2025 in Reno, Nevada. During the preliminary competition, Eckert was awarded the Best in Swimsuit preliminary award. During the final of the competition, Eckert advanced into the top 20, top ten, and top five, and ultimately was announced as the winner. With her win, she became the second entrant from Nebraska to become Miss USA.

=== Miss Universe 2025 ===
Eckert represented the United States at the Miss Universe 2025 pageant, and placed in the Top 30. Her national costume was a bald eagle.

Awards and achievements
| Preceded by Alma Cooper (Michigan) | Miss USA; 2025 | Succeeded by Justus Kelley (Virginia) |
| Preceded by Kamryn Buchanan | Miss Nebraska USA; 2025 | Succeeded by Samantha Washington |
| Preceded by Erin Shae Swanson | Miss Nebraska Teen USA; 2020 | Succeeded by Daisy Sudderth |
