= Miss Wisconsin USA =

Beauty pageant competition

- Formation: 1952
- Type: Beauty pageant
- Headquarters: Savage
- Location: Minnesota
- Members: Miss USA
- Official language: English
- Key people: Kelly McCoy
- Website: Official website

The Miss Wisconsin USA competition is the pageant that selects the representative for the state of Wisconsin in the Miss USA pageant.

It is produced by Future Productions based in Savage, Minnesota from 2007 until 2024 and from 2025 onwards is produced by KPC Productions based in West Des Moines, Iowa.

Wisconsin is one of the least successful states in the Miss USA system with only eight placements in over sixty years as the state has yet to win the Miss USA title. The most recent placement was Aneisha Cox in 2025. Alexis Maria Loomans in 2023, placing 2nd runner-up is the state highest placing since Mary Cook earning 2nd runner-up in 1974 as well, and they had no placements from 1979 until 2007, when Caitlin Morrall made the top fifteen. In 2005, Melissa Ann Young won the Miss Congeniality award. Elyzabeth Lee Pham won Miss Photogenic in 1999 and Kate Redeker at Miss USA 2016.

Olivia Lulich of Lyndon Station was crowned Miss Wisconsin USA 2026 on May 30, 2026, at The Franklin Center in Des Moines. She will represent Wisconsin at Miss USA 2026.

== Gallery of titleholders ==
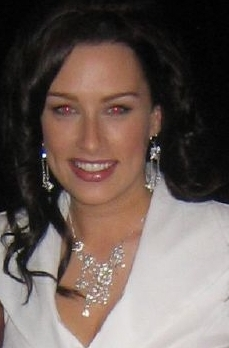
Melissa Ann Young, Miss Wisconsin USA 2005

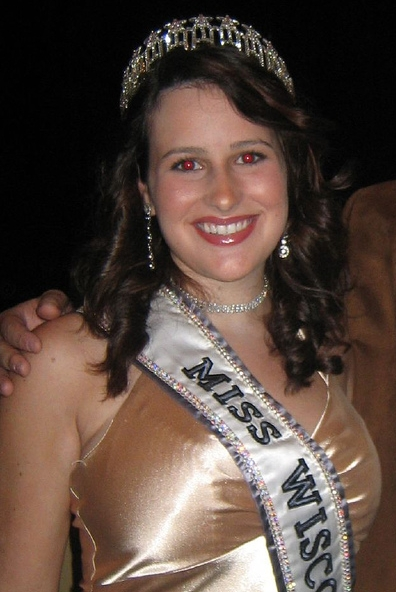
Anna Piscitello, Miss Wisconsin USA 2006

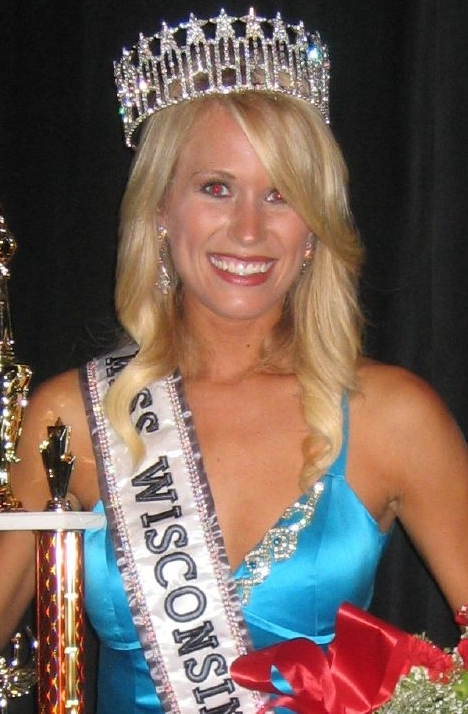
Caitlin Morrall, Miss Wisconsin USA 2007

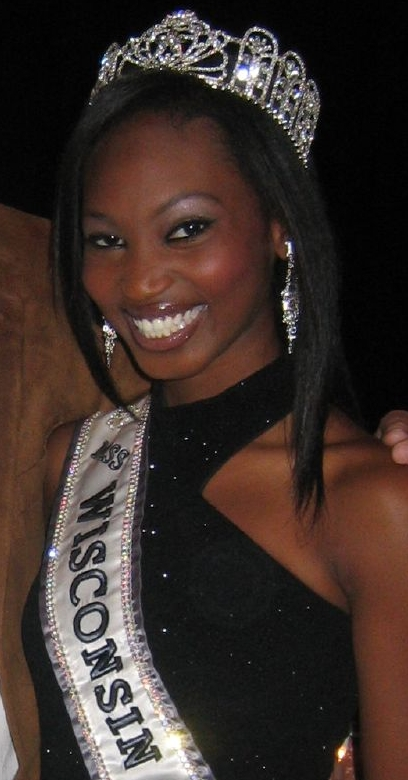
Bishara Dorre, Miss Wisconsin USA 2014 and Miss Wisconsin Teen USA 2006

== Results summary ==
=== Placements ===
- 2nd runner-up: Mary Lynn Cook (1974), Alexis Maria Loomans (2023)
- 3rd runner-up: Jodi Bonham (1967)
- Top 10/12: Kathryn Wituschek (1979), Bishara Dorre (2014)
- Top 15/20: Rita Delores Younger (1954), Jeanne Boulay (1955), Caitlin Morrall (2007), Aneisha Cox (2025)

Wisconsin holds a record of 9 placements at Miss USA.

=== Awards ===
- Miss Photogenic: Elyzabeth Lee Pham (1999), Kate Redeker (2016)
- Miss Congeniality: Melissa Ann Young (2005)
- Best State Costume: Diane Modrow (1973)

== Winners ==
Color key

- Declared as Winner
- Ended as runner-up
- Ended as one of the finalists or semifinalists

Year	Name	Hometown	Age (Note: Age at the time of the Miss USA pageant)	Local title	Placement at Miss USA	Special awards at Miss USA	Notes
2026	Olivia Lulich	Lyndon Station	23				Previously Miss Wisconsin Teen USA 2020
2025	Aneisha Cox	Green Bay	23	Miss Green Bay	Top 20		
2024	Tori Trittin	Madison	22	Miss South Central Wisconsin			Previously Miss Minnesota Teen USA 2017
2023	Alexis Maria Loomans	Waunakee	21	Miss Dane County	2nd runner-up		Previously Miss Wisconsin Teen USA 2018
2022	Hollis Brown	Milwaukee	26	Miss Southeast Wisconsin			
2021	Samantha Catherine Keaton	Milwaukee	20	Miss Milwaukee			Later Miss Grand US Virgin Islands 2024
2020	Gabriella Deyi	Madison	27				Longest reigning Miss Wisconsin USA at 1 year, 8 months and 15 days
2019	Danika Tramburg	Richfield	22				Previously Miss Wisconsin United States 2017
2018	Regina Gray	Milwaukee	27				Later Miss Supranational USA 2019; 7th at Miss Supranational 2019
2017	Skylar Witte	Schofield	19				Formerly an event coordinator for Future Productions
2016	Kate Redeker	Sheboygan	19			Miss Photogenic	Previously Miss Wisconsin Teen USA 2013; Top 16 at Miss Teen USA 2013
2015	Haley Laundrie	Lake Mills	21				
2014	Bishara Dorre	Milwaukee	24		Top 10		Previously Miss Wisconsin Teen USA 2006; Previously Miss Wisconsin's Outstanding Teen 2007; Top 10 at Miss America's Outstanding Teen 2008; Previously National American Miss 2010; Former Milwaukee Bucks cheerleader
2013	Chrissy Zamora	Greenfield	25				
2012	Emily Guerin	Monroe	23				
2011	Jordan Morkin	Green Bay	21				Originally first runner-up, assumed the title after Shaletta Porterfield's resignation. Competed at Miss USA.
2011	Shaletta Porterfield	Madison/West Bloomfield, MI	26		did not compete		Resigned on May 12, 2011, after being charged with three counts of identity theft.
2010	Courtney Lopez	Franksville	20				Previously Miss Wisconsin Teen USA 2008; 2013 Houston Texans Cheerleader
2009	Alexandra Wehrley	Pewaukee	21				Host of Oklahoma Live on KSBI, co-host of the Miss USA 2015 pageant, and host of the Miss USA 2017 preliminary competition.
2008	Michelyn Butler	Madison	25				Contestant at National Sweetheart 2007
2007	Caitlin Morrall	Burlington	23		Top 15		Contestant at National Sweetheart 2003
2006	Anna Piscitello	Hartland	20				
2005	Melissa Ann Young	Menasha	25			Miss Congeniality	
2004	Jenna Schultz	Pewaukee	20				
2003	Judith Eckerle	Milwaukee	26				
2002	Cortney Owen	Muskego	18				
2001	Kari Jo Dodge	Star Prairie	19				
2000	Samantha Jo Picha	Verona	25				
1999	Elyzabeth Pham	Madison	26			Miss Photogenic	
1998	Michelle Altman	Green Bay	21				
1997	Tara Johnson	Onalaska	21				
1996	Mary Stoker	Madison/West Salem	26				First African American titleholder
1995	Tanae Geisler	Hudson	19				Previously Miss Wisconsin Teen USA 1993
1994	Gina Desmond	Milwaukee	25				
1993	Heather Hanson	Madison/Cascade	20				
1992	Kelly Bright	Greenfield	25				
1991	Kimberly Totdahl	Racine	24				Previously Miss Wisconsin 1989
1990	Lynn Mulcahy	Madison	20				
1989	Sherri Baxter	Madison/Plymouth, MN	19				
1988	Mary Anderson	St Francis	22				Previously Miss Wisconsin 1985.
1987	Regina Part	Stevens Point	19				
1986	Bonnie Bonnicksen	Madison	23				
1985	Deborah Strauss	Thiensville	22				
1984	Tamara Su Schoof	Milwaukee	24				
1983	Susan Peters	Menomonee Falls	20				
1982	Cheryl Maslowski	Milwaukee	21				
1981	Dawn Spreeman	Kaukauna	18				
1980	Susan McGaffigan	Pewaukee	21				
1979	Kathryn Wituschek	Milwaukee	24		Semi-finalist		
1978	Cynthia Paulson	Milwaukee	24				
1977	Vicki Payne	Milwaukee	24				
1976	Susan Femrite	Madison	19				
1975	Rita Pedder	Madison	22				
1974	Mary Lynn Cook	Wind Lake	23		2nd runner-up		
1973	Diane Modrow	Green Bay	20			Best State Costume (Tied with Miss Texas USA)	
1972	Suzan Nass	Menomonie	19				
1971	Pamela Martin	Milwaukee	25				
1970	Joann Soller	Eau Claire	20				
1969	Christine Sachen	Racine	21				
1968	Janice Kopps	Milwaukee	21				
1967	Jodi Bonham	Milwaukee	23		3rd runner-up		
1966	Janet Driscoll	Milwaukee	22				
1965	Judith Ann "Judy" Achtor	Milwaukee	22				Died on January 18, 2016, in Milwaukee at age 70.
1964	Carolyne Limquite	Milwaukee	26				
1963	Lynn Korchunoff	Milwaukee	18				
1962	Sherri Mattison	Milwaukee	20				
1961	Karen Reisweber	Milwaukee	21				
1960	Sharyn Chalik	Milwaukee	22				
1959	Charlene Krause	Milwaukee	24				
1958	Did not compete						
1957	Natalie Lueck	Milwaukee	25				
1956	Priscilla Perkins	Milwaukee	23				
1955	Jeanne Marianne Boulay	Fond du Lac	19		Semi-finalist		
1954	Rita Delores Younger	Baraboo	21		Semi-finalist		
1953	Jacque Kimmel	Milwaukee	24				
1952	Jeannie Eleanor Huston	Milwaukee	20		Withdrew		
