= Miss USA 2021 =

70th Miss USA pageant

- Date: November 29, 2021
- Presenters: Zuri Hall; Patrick Ta; Nicole Adamo
- Entertainment: Ja Rule
- Venue: Paradise Cove Theater, River Spirit Casino Resort, Tulsa, Oklahoma
- Broadcaster: FYI; KTUO-LD; Hulu
- Entrants: 51
- Placements: 16
- Winner: Elle Smith; Kentucky
- Congeniality: Taylor Hale, Michigan
- Best State Costume: Elizabeth Pistole, Tennessee
- Photogenic: Sydney Robertson, Pennsylvania

Miss USA 2021 was the 70th Miss USA pageant, held at the Paradise Cove Theater of River Spirit Casino Resort in Tulsa, Oklahoma on November 29, 2021. The edition marked the first year of the competition under Crystle Stewart's directorship.

At the end of the event, Asya Branch of Mississippi crowned Elle Smith of Kentucky as Miss USA 2021. This was Kentucky's first title in fifteen years. Smith is also the third consecutive African-American to win the title, and the fifth one in six years. Smith went on to represent the United States at the Miss Universe 2021 pageant, placing in the top ten. The scheduling for the succeeding year's pageant that Smith would serve the pageant for ten months and four days as one of the shortest reigning titleholders in the pageant.

The competition was hosted by Zuri Hall and Patrick Ta, while Nicole Adamo served as a lounge host. American rapper Ja Rule performed in this edition. This was the second consecutive year that the pageant was broadcast on FYI, and the first to be streamed live on Hulu.

== Background ==
On December 31, 2020, it was announced on Good Morning America that Miss USA and Miss Teen USA would be split from the Miss Universe Organization into a new organization under the helm of Crystle Stewart. Stewart had previously been crowned Miss USA 2008.

=== Location ===
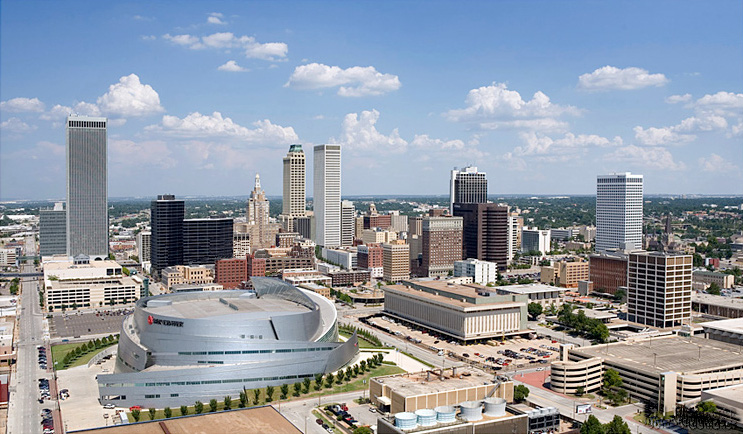
Tulsa, Oklahoma, the host city of Miss USA 2021.

On April 20, 2021, it was confirmed by the Muscogee (Creek) Nation that the 2021 edition of Miss USA and Miss Teen USA would be held at the Paradise Cove Theater of River Spirit Casino Resort in Tulsa, Oklahoma. The competition spanned four days, beginning on November 26 and concluding on November 29, 2021. The event reverted to its full spectator capacity after the previous event was downsized to 300 spectators as a precaution to the ongoing COVID-19 pandemic in the United States.

=== Impact of the COVID-19 on state pageants ===
The COVID-19 pandemic affected the schedule of Miss USA 2020, postponing it from spring 2020 to November 2020. Each state organization had initially planned to schedule their 2021 pageants for the fall 2020 and winter 2020–21, the typical timeframe for state pageants dating back to the 1970s. However, most state pageants were later rescheduled to spring and summer 2021 to avoid scheduling conflicts with Miss America 2022 state pageants typically took place in most of June 2021, and were further extended to late summer and early fall due to the concerns over the possibility onto the threats of COVID-19 resurgence.

2021 state pageants altered due to COVID-19
State	Original date	New date taken
Texas Texas	September 6, 2020	September 4, 2021
Wisconsin Wisconsin	September 13, 2020	May 23, 2021
Wyoming Wyoming	September 19, 2020	June 19, 2021
Michigan Michigan	September 26, 2020	August 7, 2021
North Dakota North Dakota	September 26, 2020	April 25, 2021
South Dakota South Dakota	September 27, 2020	April 25, 2021
Alabama Alabama	October 10, 2020	January 10, 2021
Tennessee Tennessee	October 10, 2020	March 13, 2021
Iowa Iowa	October 11, 2020	May 8, 2021
Rhode Island Rhode Island	October 11, 2020	August 8, 2021
Louisiana Louisiana	October 17, 2020	January 16, 2021
West Virginia West Virginia	October 18, 2020	July 11, 2021
Mississippi Mississippi	October 24, 2020	March 13, 2021
Arkansas Arkansas	October 25, 2020	May 23, 2021
Colorado Colorado	October 25, 2020	August 15, 2021
Vermont Vermont	November 1, 2020	June 6, 2021
North Carolina North Carolina	November 7, 2020	March 6, 2021
Hawaii Hawaii	November 8, 2020	December 10, 2020
Maine Maine	November 8, 2020	June 20, 2021
Maryland Maryland	November 8, 2020	July 25, 2021
Pennsylvania Pennsylvania	November 8, 2020	July 31, 2021 (Note: State pageant had passed to the new pageant director)
Ohio Ohio	November 14, 2020	July 10, 2021
Georgia Georgia	November 21, 2020	February 20, 2021
Oregon Oregon	November 21, 2020	March 20, 2021
South Carolina South Carolina	November 21, 2020	March 6, 2021
Connecticut Connecticut	November 22, 2020	June 6, 2021
Illinois Illinois	November 22, 2020	June 27, 2021
Indiana Indiana	November 22, 2020	July 26, 2021
Massachusetts Massachusetts	November 22, 2020	June 13, 2021
New Jersey New Jersey	November 22, 2020	August 1, 2021
Washington (state) Washington	November 22, 2020	March 21, 2021
Minnesota Minnesota	November 29, 2020	August 1, 2021
New Hampshire New Hampshire	November 29, 2020	June 13, 2021
Missouri Missouri	December 6, 2020	May 1, 2021
Oklahoma Oklahoma	December 20, 2020	June 5, 2021
Arizona Arizona	January 3, 2021	July 11, 2021
Washington, D.C. District of Columbia	January 9, 2021	July 17, 2021
Virginia Virginia	January 9, 2021	July 17, 2021
Nebraska Nebraska	January 10, 2021	May 16, 2021
Nevada Nevada	January 10, 2021	June 27, 2021
Kansas Kansas	January 17, 2021	April 11, 2021
New York New York	January 17, 2021	August 20, 2021
New Mexico New Mexico	January 24, 2021	August 15, 2021
Kentucky Kentucky	January 30, 2021	May 22, 2021

Due to restrictions implemented in all 50 states and the District of Columbia, numerous health and safety guidelines have been implemented for contestants, production members, and audiences at state pageants, such as taking a negative COVID-19 test and following social distancing. Additionally, a number of state pageants have had to alter their initial venue choices due to shut-downs implemented by their governor; either held behind closed doors such as Alaska and Hawaii, with only the contestants and staff were present; most state pageants had limited audition capacity with applying social distancing measures, or some with full capacity.

=== Selection of contestants ===
Delegates from the fifty states and District of Columbia were selected in state pageants which began in September 2020. The first state pageants were Idaho and Montana, held together on their original dates of September 27, 2020, and the last state pageant was California, held on September 12, 2021, 350 days after the start of the 2021 pageant season, became the longest in the Miss USA history.

Eleven delegates previously competed in Miss Teen USA and Miss America, in which eight delegates are former Miss Teen USA state winners and three are former Miss America state winners. Kataluna Enriquez, Miss Nevada USA 2021, became the first openly transgender woman to compete in Miss USA.

== Results ==
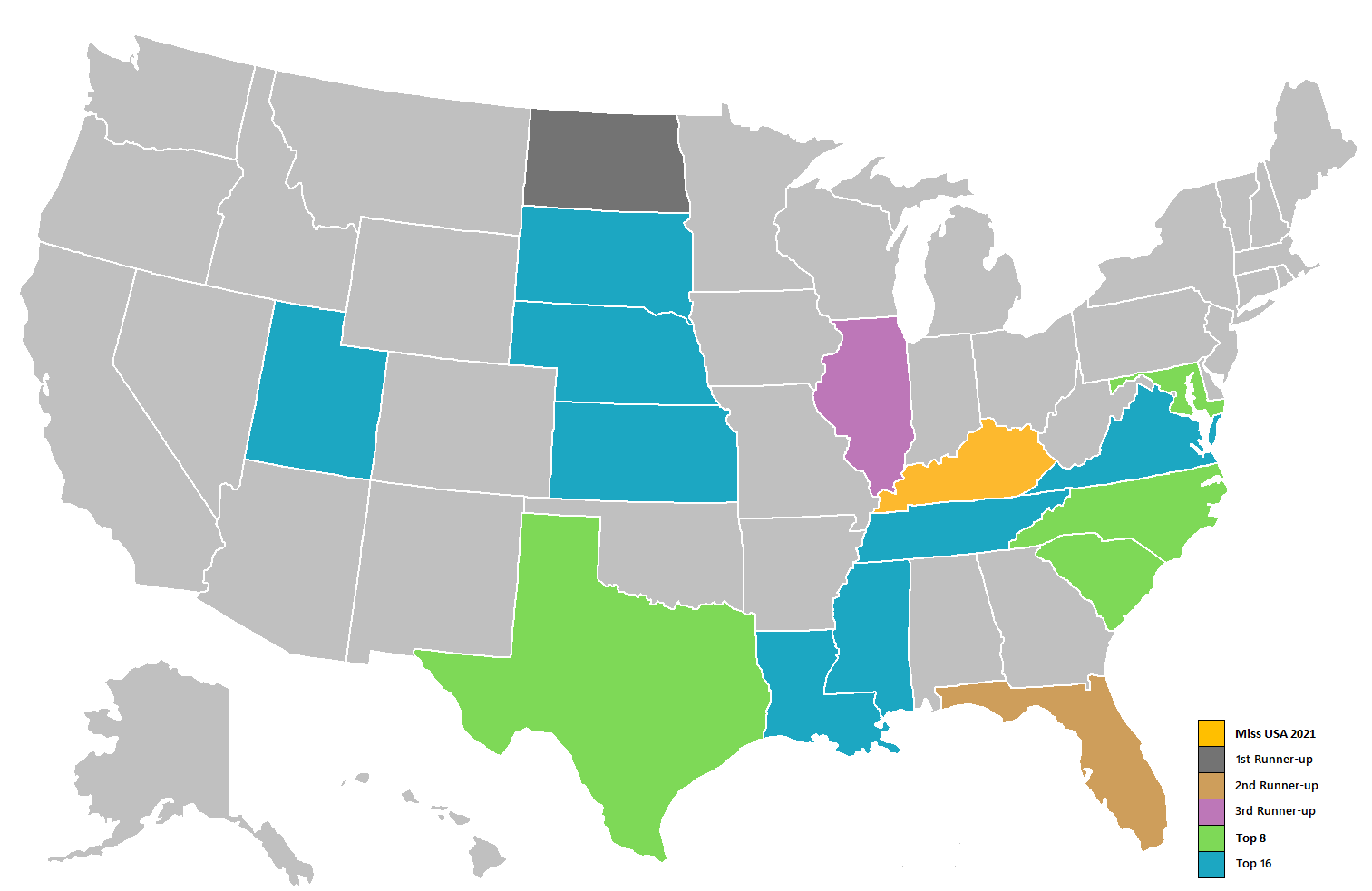
Miss USA 2021 results map, colors shaded in each state

=== Placements ===
Placement	Contestant
Miss USA 2021	Kentucky – Elle Smith
1st Runner-Up	North Dakota – Caitlyn Vogel
2nd Runner-Up	Florida – Ashley Cariño
3rd Runner-Up	Illinois – Sydni Bennett
Top 8	Maryland – Layilah Nasser; North Carolina – Madison Bryant; South Carolina – Marley Stokes; Texas – Victoria Hinojosa
Top 16	Kansas – Gracie Hunt; Louisiana – Tanya Crowe; Mississippi – Bailey Anderson; Nebraska – Erika Etzelmiller; South Dakota – Caroline Pettey; Tennessee – Elizabeth Pistole; Utah – JessiKate Riley; Virginia – Christina Thompson

§ – Voted into top 16 through the online vote

=== Special awards ===
Award		Contestant
Best State Costume	Winner	Tennessee – Elizabeth Pistole
Best State Costume	Second Place	Utah – JessiKate Riley
Best State Costume	Third Place	Oklahoma – Albreuna Gonzaque
Miss Congeniality		Michigan – Taylor Hale
Miss Photogenic		Pennsylvania – Sydney Robertson

== Pageant ==
After the last year's event was impacted by the still-ongoing COVID-19 pandemic, events such as pre-pageant activities and press briefings from pageant commentators were returned across Tulsa.

=== Preliminary competition ===
Prior to the final competition, the delegates competed the preliminary competition, where they competed in swim wear and evening gown. It was held on November 26 at River Spirit Casino Resort hosted by Nicole Adamo and Asya Branch.

=== Finals ===
As was the case the prior edition, 16 contestants were chosen to advance to the semifinals; 15 of the semifinalists were chosen by the preliminary judges, while one was chosen through the online fan vote. The Top 16 then competed in both swimsuit and evening gown, before eight were chosen to advance. The Top 8 participated in a group discussion round conducted in two groups of four, and afterwards answered their final questions from the judges. The winner and her runners-up were announced afterwards.

=== Judges ===
==== Preliminary ====
- Paul Anthony – American hairstylist
- Elan Biongiorno – American celebrity make-up artist
- LeeAnne Locken – American reality television personality and Miss Arizona USA 1989
- Pamela Price – American marathon runner
- Chuck Steelman – American fashion analyst and expert

==== Finals ====
- Natalía Barulích – Croatian-Cuban model, social media influencer, and singer
- Sophie Elgort – American photographer
- Chloe Flower – American composer and classical pianist
- Ty Hunter – American personal stylist
- Haley Kalil – American model and Miss Minnesota USA 2014
- Alton Mason – American model
- Pascal Mouawad – Lebanese jeweler, businessman, and CEO of Mouawad
- Oliver Trevena – English actor and television presenter

== Contestants ==
Fifty-one contestants competed for the title.

State/district	Contestant	Age (Note: Ages at the time of the pageant)	Hometown	Notes
Alabama	Alexandria Flanigan	25	Cullman	
Alaska	Madison Lea Edwards	25	Anchorage	
Arizona	Cassidy Jo Jacks	27	Mesa	Later contestant on season 1 of Farmer Wants a Wife
Arkansas	Stephanie Barber	23	Fayetteville	
California	Sabrina Lewis	24	Berkeley	Later Miss California 2023
Colorado	Olivia Lorenzo	20	Fort Collins	
Connecticut	Amanda Torchia	25	Middlebury	
Delaware	Drew Sanclemente	25	Odessa	
District of Columbia	Sasha Perea	28	Washington, D.C.	
Florida	Ashley Ann Cariño Barreto	27	Kissimmee	Later Miss Universe Puerto Rico 2022
Georgia	Cora Griffen	25	Columbus	
Hawaii	Allison Chu	27	Honolulu	Previously Miss Hawaii 2016; Sister of Julianne Chu, Miss Hawaii USA 2018
Idaho	Katarina Schweitzer	27	Boise	
Illinois	Sydni Bennett	20	Algonquin	Previously Miss Illinois Teen USA 2018
Indiana	A'Niyah Birdsong	26	Anderson	
Iowa	Katie Wadman	21	Iowa City	
Kansas	Gracie Hunt	22	Overland Park	Daughter of Clark Hunt and Tavia Shackles, Miss Kansas USA 1993, and granddaughter of Lamar Hunt
Kentucky	Elle Smith	23	Louisville	
Louisiana	Tanya Crowe	28	Amite City	Professional cheerleader for the New Orleans Saintsations
Maine	VeronicaIris Bates	21	Portland	Active member of the United States Air Force
Maryland	Layilah Nasser	26	Montgomery Village	
Massachusetts	Sarah DeSouza	25	Dracut	
Michigan	Taylor Mackenzie Hale	26	Detroit	Later winner of Big Brother 24 and America's Favorite Houseguest
Minnesota	Katarina Spasojevic	20	Minnetonka	
Mississippi	Bailey Anderson	22	Hurley	
Missouri	Joye Forrest	26	Spanish Lake	Former professional cheerleader for the Los Angeles Laker Girls
Montana	Jami Forseth	24	Huntley	Previously Miss Montana Teen USA 2016
Nebraska	Erika Etzelmiller	24	Lincoln	Previously Miss Nebraska Teen USA 2016
Nevada	Kataluna Patricia Enriquez	27	Las Vegas	First openly transgender woman to compete at Miss USA
New Hampshire	Taylor Fogg	26	Newbury	
New Jersey	Celinda Ortega	26	Fair Lawn	
New Mexico	Christa Schafer	26	Las Cruces	
New York	Briana Siaca	27	Brentwood	
North Carolina	Madison Bryant	24	Fayetteville	
North Dakota	Caitlyn Vogel	21	Minot	Previously Miss North Dakota Teen USA 2019
Ohio	Nicole Wess	23	Cincinnati	
Oklahoma	Albreuna Dominique Gonzaque	28	Oklahoma City	
Oregon	Allison Cook	27	Portland	Previously Miss Oregon 2013
Pennsylvania	Sydney Robertson	24	Williamsport	Previously Miss Pennsylvania Teen USA 2014
Rhode Island	Karly Laliberte	27	Pawtucket	
South Carolina	Marley Stokes	24	Lexington	Previously Miss South Carolina Teen USA 2016
South Dakota	Caroline Pettey	27	Rapid City	
Tennessee	Elizabeth Pistole	21	Franklin	
Texas	Victoria Hinojosa	22	McAllen	Granddaughter of U.S. Representative Rubén Hinojosa
Utah	JessiKate Riley	25	Beaver	Previously Miss Utah's Outstanding Teen 2014; Previously Miss Utah 2017
Vermont	Joanna Nagle	27	Colchester	
Virginia	Christina Thompson	25	Leesburg	Previously Miss New Jersey Teen USA 2013; Daughter of Hallie Bonnell, Miss Ohio USA 1987
Washington	Christine Brodie	26	Seattle	
West Virginia	Alexis Bland	22	Parkersburg	
Wisconsin	Samantha Keaton	20	Milwaukee	
Wyoming	Mackenzie Kern	21	Casper	Previously Miss Wyoming Teen USA 2018 Later Miss Wyoming 2023
