= Elle Smith =

American beauty pageant contestant

- Born: Ellen Elizabeth Smith; June 19, 1998 (age 28); Springfield, Ohio, U.S.
- Education: University of Kentucky (BA)
- Height: 5 ft 10 in (178 cm)
- Beauty pageant titleholder
- Title: Miss Kentucky USA 2021; Miss USA 2021
- Years active: 2021–present
- Eye color: Hazel
- Major competitions: Miss Kentucky USA 2021; (Winner); Miss USA 2021; (Winner); Miss Universe 2021; (Top 10)

Ellen Elizabeth "Elle" Smith (born June 19, 1998) is an American journalist and beauty pageant titleholder who won Miss USA 2021. As Miss USA, she represented the United States at Miss Universe 2021, and placed in the Top 10. Smith had won Miss Kentucky USA 2021, and is the second woman from Kentucky to win Miss USA.

== Early life and education ==
Ellen Elizabeth Smith was born June 19, 1998 in Springfield, Ohio, to parents Samuel Clayborne and Lydia Smith; she is biracial, being born to a black father and a white mother. Her black ancestors were enslaved on a plantation in Kentucky, before migrating to Ohio in the aftermath of the American Civil War.

Smith graduated from Shawnee High School in 2016, where she was an honors student involved in choir, orchestra, volleyball, and drama. Afterwards, she moved to Lexington, Kentucky, to enroll in the University of Kentucky, graduating with a degree in broadcast journalism and a minor in political science in 2020. While a student, Smith served as vice president of the university's chapter of the National Association of Black Journalists. After completing her degree, Smith became an on-air reporter with WHAS-TV in Louisville, Kentucky, covering Southern Indiana within the Louisville metropolitan area.

== Pageantry ==
Smith first became interested in competing in pageantry after one of her high school classmates, Brittany Reid, won Miss Ohio Teen USA 2013. She did not complete in a pageant herself until eight years later, when she entered and won Miss Kentucky USA 2021, representing Germantown, Louisville.

=== Miss USA 2021 ===
As Miss Kentucky USA, Smith represented Kentucky and won Miss USA 2021, on November 29, 2021, in Tulsa, Oklahoma. Smith became the second entrant from Kentucky to win Miss USA, after Tara Conner won in 2006.

In the final question portion, Smith picked judge Ty Hunter, who asked "Sustainability is becoming more and more important in professional landscapes. How can we encourage business to be more environmentally conscious?," to which she answered:

I think we've got to look at it from a macro level and also a micro level. So at the macro level, companies need to switch to green energy, I think that's something we can all agree on. On the micro level, we all know how to reduce, reuse, and recycle, and those are things that we can implement in our daily lives.

Smith moved to Los Angeles to participate in events for the year of her reign.

=== Miss Universe 2021 ===
As Miss USA, Smith represented the United States at Miss Universe 2021, where she reached the top 10. Her national costume was an Emmy Award.

== Personal life ==
Smith is in a relationship with English professional soccer player Leah Williamson.

Awards and achievements
Preceded by Lexie Iles	Miss Kentucky USA; 2021	Succeeded by Lizzy Neutz
Preceded by Mississippi, Asya Branch	Miss USA; 2021	Succeeded by Texas, R'Bonney Gabriel
