= Kiʻilani Arruda =

American beauty pageant titleholder

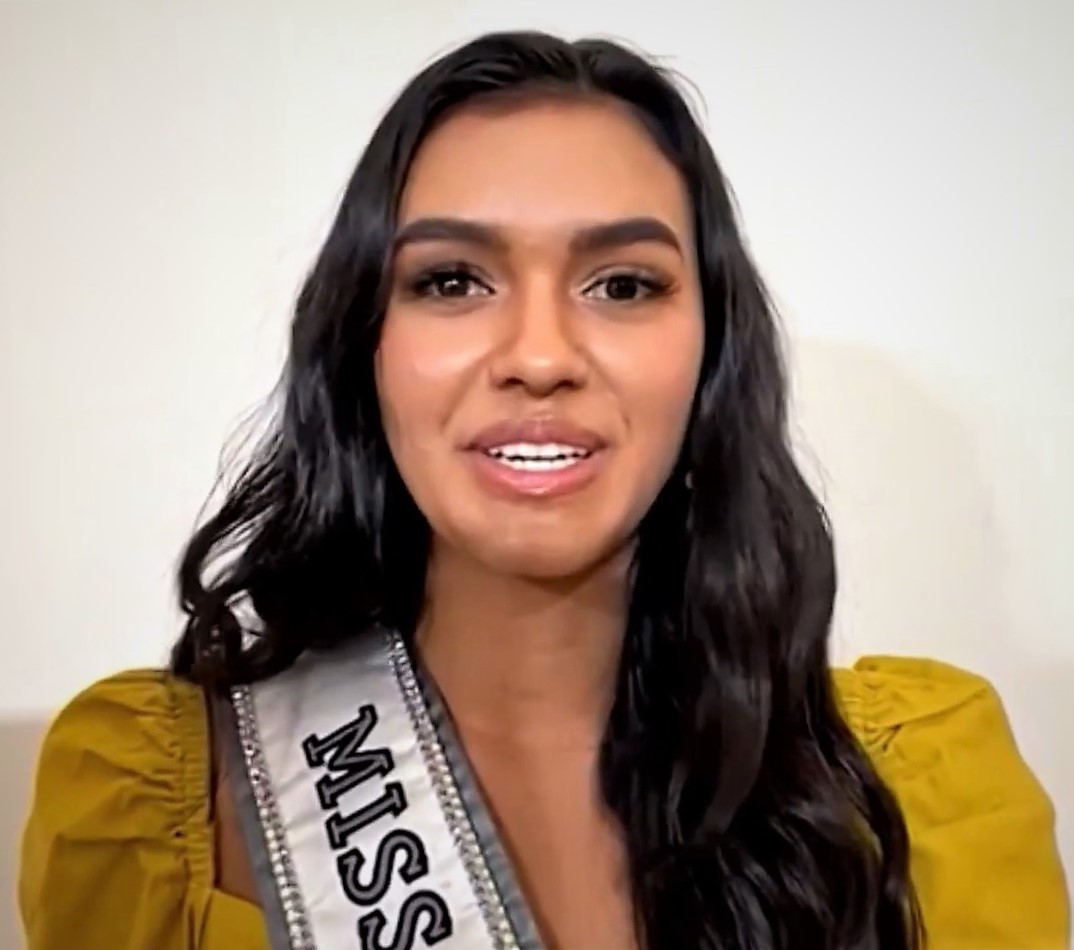
- Arruda in 2020
- Born: April 13, 2002 (age 24); Kapaa, Hawaii, U.S.
- Education: University of Puget Sound
- Beauty pageant titleholder
- Title: Miss Kauai Teen USA 2018; Miss Hawaii Teen USA 2020; Miss Teen USA 2020
- Major competitions: Miss Hawaii Teen USA 2020; (Winner); Miss Teen USA 2020; (Winner)

Kiʻilani Arruda (born April 13, 2002) is an American beauty pageant titleholder who won Miss Hawaii Teen USA 2020. Arruda had previously won Miss Teen USA 2020; she is the second competitor from Hawaii to have won Miss Teen USA.

== Early life and education ==
Arruda was born on April 13, 2002, in Kapaa, Hawaii. She is half Filipino. She has two siblings, one with autism, that led her to became an advocate for autism awareness.

Arruda attended Island School in Lihue, where she was elected student body president and graduated in 2020. While at high school, she was a member of her school's varsity volleyball, swim, and track and field teams. Prior to becoming Miss Teen USA, she was a freshman at the University of Puget Sound, studying molecular and cellular biology on a pre-medical track, with a minor in Spanish.

== Pageantry ==
Arruda won Miss Kauai Teen USA 2018, which allowed her to compete in Miss Hawaii Teen USA 2019, where she was second runner-up and Miss Congeniality. She returned to the competition the following year, and was won Miss Hawaii Teen USA 2020.

As Miss Hawaii Teen USA, Arruda represented Hawaii and won Miss Teen USA 2020. Originally planned for the spring of 2020, the competition was postponed due to the COVID-19 pandemic, and later held on November 7, 2020, at Graceland in Memphis, Tennessee. She was crowned by the outgoing titleholder Kaliegh Garris. Arruda became the second competitor from Hawaii to win the competition, following Kelly Hu who won Miss Teen USA 1985.

Awards and achievements
Preceded by Kaliegh Garris Connecticut	Miss Teen USA; 2020	Succeeded by Breanna Myles Florida
Preceded by Leimakamae Freitas	Miss Hawaii Teen USA; 2020	Succeeded by Tia Bustamante
