= Asya Branch =

Miss USA 2020

- Born: Asya Danielle Branch; May 5, 1998 (age 28); Detroit, Michigan, U.S.
- Education: University of Mississippi (BA)
- Occupation: Student
- Height: 5 ft 5 in (165 cm)
- Beauty pageant titleholder
- Title: Miss Mississippi 2018; Miss Mississippi USA 2020; Miss USA 2020
- Years active: 2018–present
- Hair color: Brown
- Eye color: Brown
- Major competitions: Miss Mississippi 2018; (Winner); Miss America 2019; (Unplaced); Miss Mississippi USA 2020; (Winner); Miss USA 2020; (Winner); Miss Universe 2020; (Top 21)

Asya Danielle Branch (born May 5, 1998) is an American beauty pageant titleholder who was crowned Miss USA 2020 and represented her country at Miss Universe 2020 where she reached in the top 21.

== Early life ==
Asya Danielle Branch was born in Detroit, Michigan, to African American parents and is the sixth child of eight siblings.

Branch grew up as the child of an incarcerated parent, and now advocates for prison reform. In 2018, while she was Miss Mississippi, she was part of a criminal justice reform roundtable at the White House with Donald Trump and Jared Kushner. She also sang the national anthem at a rally for Donald Trump that same year.

Drawing inspiration from her personal experiences, particularly the incarceration of her father, a devout man, when she was just 10 years old, she utilized her title to advocate for the children facing similar situations. Motivated by the absence of her father during a significant part of her formative years, she established the Finding Your Way initiative, aimed at empowering children with incarcerated parents.

== Education ==
Branch's family moved to Booneville, Mississippi the summer before she started kindergarten. After graduating from Booneville High School, Branch moved to Oxford, Mississippi, to attend the University of Mississippi. She graduated from the School of Journalism and New Media with a degree in Integrated Marketing Communications with an emphasis in Public relations and a minor in General Business. She has said that she hopes to work for a public relations firm or major corporation.

== Pageantry ==
Branch won her first pageant, Miss Historic Crossroads, in 2016. That same year, she competed in Miss Mississippi reaching 11th place. In 2017, she competed in Miss Mississippi as Miss All-America City, where she was named fourth alternate. Branch went on to win Miss Mississippi 2018, and then to Miss America 2019 where she was unplaced.

As Miss Mississippi USA, Branch represented Mississippi at Miss USA 2020, becoming the first Mississippi representative to win Miss USA, as well as the first African-American woman to be crowned Miss Mississippi USA. Originally scheduled for the spring of 2020, the Miss USA 2020 competition was postponed due to the COVID-19 pandemic in the United States, and later held on November 9, 2020, at Graceland in Memphis, Tennessee. She competed in finals and reached the semifinals in the state for the first time since 2010, where she was crowned winner by outgoing titleholder Cheslie Kryst.

In May 2021, Branch represented the United States at Miss Universe 2020, at the Seminole Hard Rock Hotel & Casino Hollywood in Florida. Her national costume was based on a northern mockingbird, a state symbol of her home state of Mississippi. Out of 74 competitors, Branch was placed in the top 21. On November 29, 2021, she crowned her successor Elle Smith of Kentucky as Miss USA 2021 at the Paradise Cove Theater of the River Spirit Casino Resort in Tulsa, Oklahoma.

== Life after pageantry ==
After competing in Miss Universe, Branch launched an initiative called “Finding Your Way: Empowering Children of Incarcerated Parents”, which aims to help families of incarcerated individuals. Part of this was "Love letters", which aims to increase communications between incarcerated family members and their children by donating stationery to inmates so they can communicate with their family. Branch said the program enabled an inmate to reconnect with her estranged son and that these stories show the success of the program. She hopes to bring her "Love letters" initiative nationwide and continus advocating for the dissolution of mandatory sentencing.

Awards and achievements
Preceded by Anne Elizabeth Buys	Miss Mississippi; 2018	Succeeded by Mary Margaret Hyer
Preceded by Madeleine Overby	Miss Mississippi USA; 2020	Succeeded by Bailey Anderson
Preceded by Cheslie Kryst, North Carolina	Miss USA; 2020	Succeeded by Elle Smith, Kentucky
