= Miss USA 2020 =

69th Miss USA pageant

- Date: November 9, 2020
- Presenters: Akbar Gbaja-Biamila; Allie LaForce; Cheslie Kryst; Christian Murphy
- Entertainment: Haley Reinhart
- Venue: Exhibition Center and the Soundstage, Graceland, Memphis, Tennessee
- Broadcaster: FYI; KPMF-LD; YouTube
- Entrants: 51
- Placements: 16
- Winner: Asya Branch; Mississippi
- Congeniality: Imani Blackmon; Washington

Miss USA 2020 was the 69th Miss USA pageant. It was held at the Exhibition Centre and the Soundstage at Graceland in Memphis, Tennessee, on November 9, 2020. Akbar Gbaja-Biamila and Allie LaForce served as hosts, while Cheslie Kryst and Christian Murphy served as backstage commentators, and Haley Reinhart performed. Cheslie Kryst of North Carolina crowned Asya Branch of Mississippi as her successor at the end of the event. Branch is the second consecutive African American to win the title, and the fourth one in five years. This is Mississippi's first win at the Miss USA pageant. Branch represented the United States at the Miss Universe 2020 pageant and placed in the Top 21.

Originally scheduled to be held in spring 2020 and was initially to air on Fox, the competition was postponed indefinitely due to the COVID-19 pandemic. On August 31, the Miss Universe Organization announced that the competition would be held on November 9 of the same year. (Note: This was the first edition of pageant not to be held in February, March, April, May, June or July and also the first pageant to take place in the fall.)

FYI served as the new broadcaster of the pageant, replacing Fox, which had broadcast the pageant since 2016. The show was also rebroadcast on November 18, 2020, on YouTube. The competition marked the first year that a new crown made by jeweler Mouawad is used at Miss USA, effectively retiring the Mikimoto Crown.

For a third consecutive year, the competition was held concurrently alongside the Miss Teen USA competition. This was the last Miss USA to be organized by Miss Universe Organization before being split into its separate organization beginning in Miss USA 2021.

== Background ==
=== Location ===
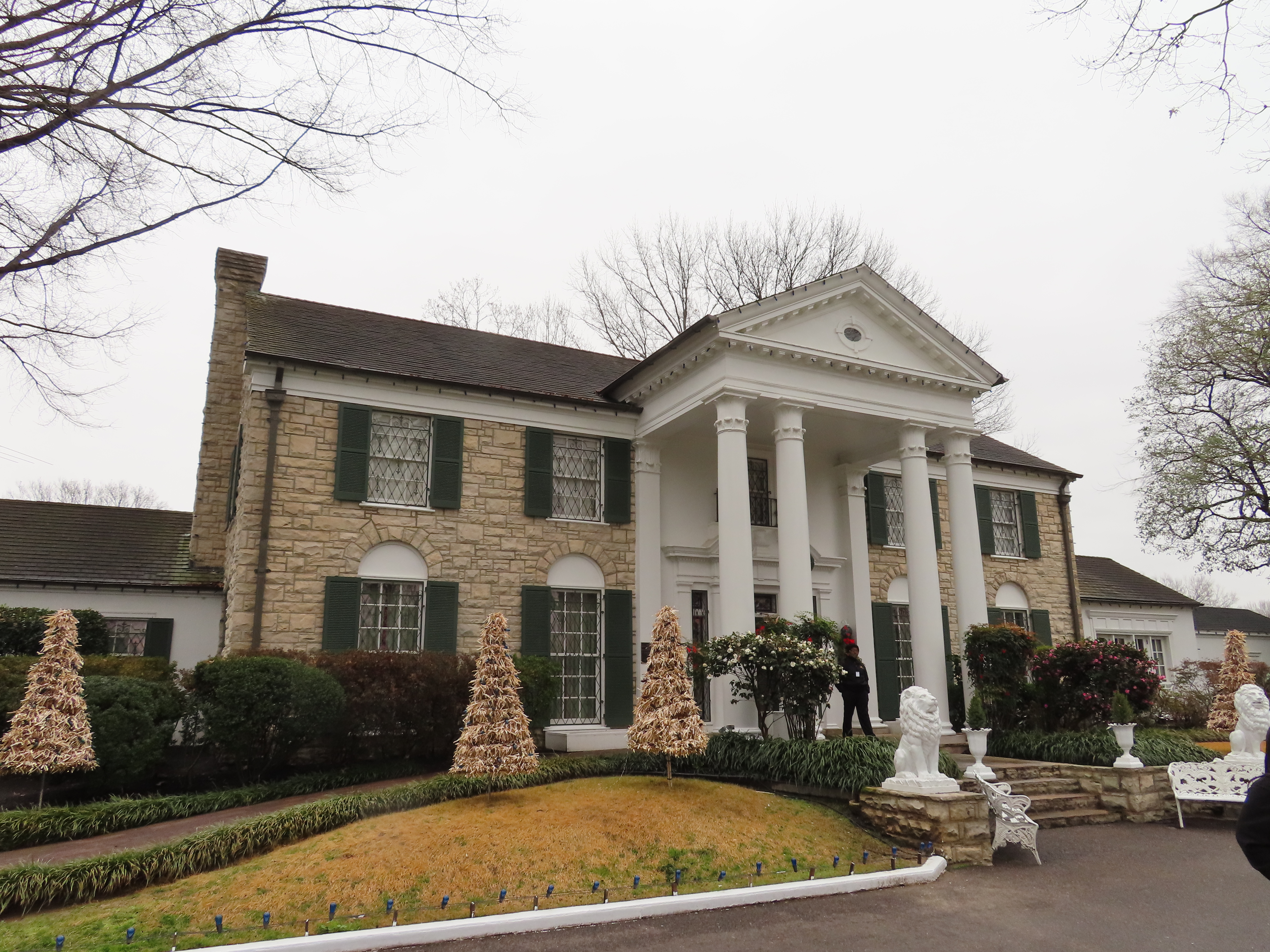
Graceland in Memphis, Tennessee, the host venue of the Miss USA 2020 competition.

On August 30, 2020, Graceland announced on their schedule that the competition would be held on November 9 on their premises in Memphis, Tennessee. The MUO later confirmed that the competition would be hosted at Graceland the following day. This was the first time since Miss USA 1983 that the state of Tennessee would be hosting the pageant.

=== Hosts and performer ===
On October 22, it was announced that the competition would be hosted by Akbar Gbaja-Biamila and Allie LaForce, while Cheslie Kryst and Christian Murphy would serve as backstage correspondents. Gbaja-Biamila is a commentator on American Ninja Warrior and former professional football player, while LaForce formerly was crowned Miss Teen USA 2005, and has worked as a sports reporter for Fox and Turner Sports.

On the same day, American Idol alum Haley Reinhart was announced as the musical guest. (Note: Although Haley Reinhart chose not to travel to Memphis for the final competition, but was pre-recorded from her home and sang Elvis Presley song "Can't Help Falling in Love" during the evening gown segment.)

=== Selection of contestants ===
Delegates from 50 states and the District of Columbia were selected in state pageants which began in September 2019 and concluded in February 2020. The first state pageant was Texas, held on September 1, 2019, while the final pageant was Kentucky, held on February 1, 2020. Nine of these delegates were former Miss Teen USA state winners, six of them were former Miss America state winners, one delegate was a former Miss America's Outstanding Teen state winner, and one was former Miss Earth United States winner who competed at Miss Earth 2017.

Rachel Slawson, Miss Utah USA 2020, became the first openly LGBT woman to compete in Miss USA; Slawson identifies herself as queer. One state titleholder was appointed as a replacement after the original titleholder was unable to compete. Katie Bozner, the original Miss Wyoming USA 2020, resigned three weeks before Miss USA 2020 due to her academic obligations in optometry school. She was replaced by Lexi Revelli, who was the first runner-up of the Miss Wyoming USA 2020 pageant.

=== COVID-19 restrictions ===
The pageant was heavily impacted by the COVID-19 pandemic. Restrictions implemented included an audience of only 300 spectators for both the preliminary and final competitions, and daily temperature checks, COVID-19 testing and social distancing measures for contestants and staff members. If a delegate tested positive from COVID-19, she would automatically withdraw from the competition, resulting in all of the delegates testing negative prior to arriving in Memphis. Other in-person events such as pre-pageant activities had been cancelled, including press briefings from pageant commentators.

== Results ==
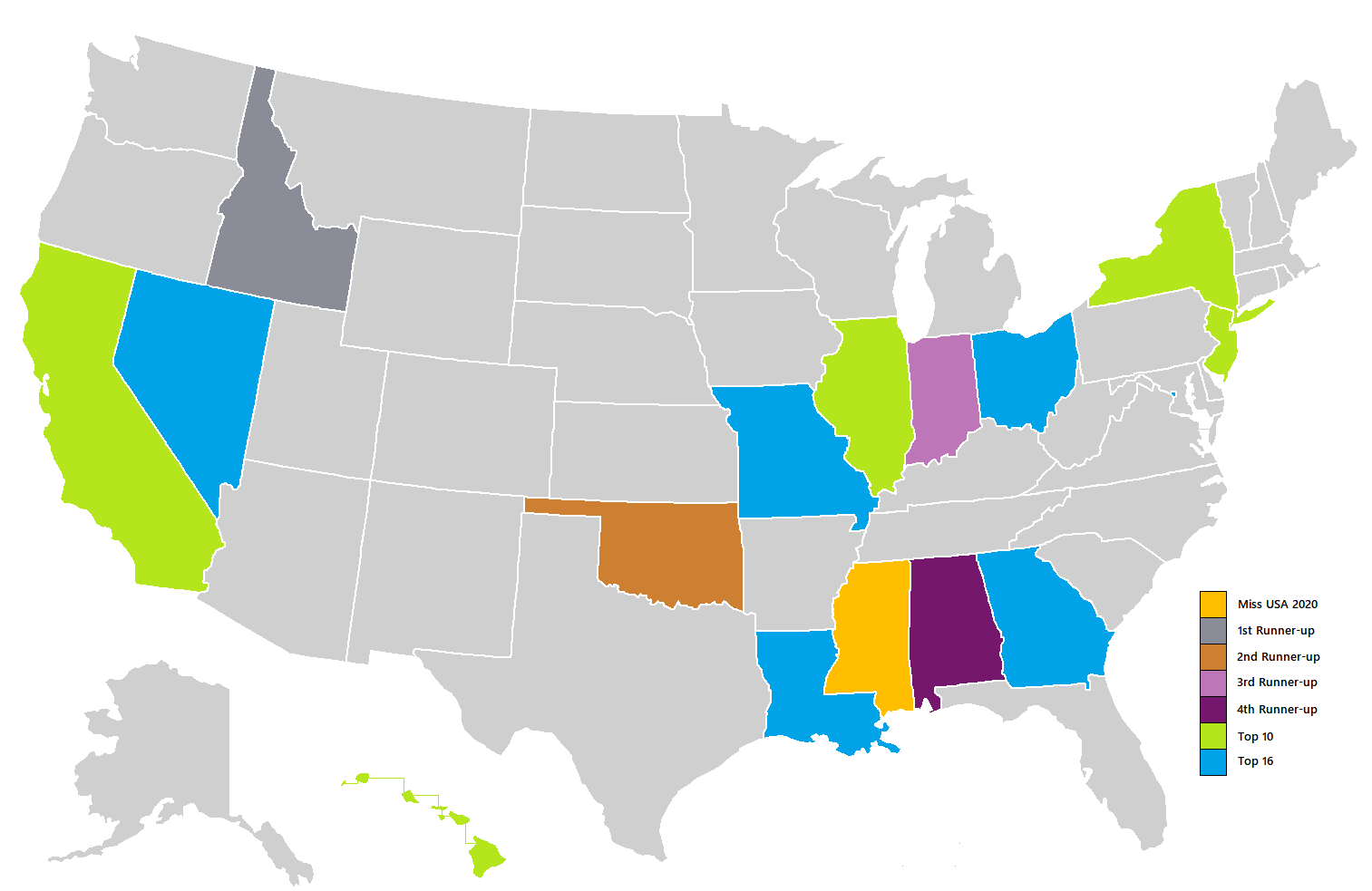
The state map results of Miss USA 2020, colors shaded in each state

=== Placements ===
Placement	Contestant
Miss USA 2020	Mississippi – Asya Branch
1st runner-up	Idaho – Kim Layne
2nd runner-up	Oklahoma – Mariah Jane Davis
3rd runner-up	Indiana – Alexis Lete
4th runner-up	Alabama – Kelly Hutchinson
Top 10	California – Allyshia Gupta; Hawaii – Samantha Neyland; Illinois – Olivia Pura; New Jersey – Gina Mellish; New York – Andreia Gibau
Top 16	District of Columbia – Cierra Jackson; Georgia – Alyssa Beasley; Louisiana – Mariah Clayton; Missouri – Megan Renee Kelly; Nevada – Victoria Olona §; Ohio – Sthephanie Miranda

§ – Voted into Top 16 by viewers

=== Special award ===
Award	Contestant
Miss Congeniality	Washington – Imani Blackmon

== Pageant ==
=== Format ===
For the first time since 2012, the number of finalists increased to sixteen, up from fifteen in previous years. The results of the preliminary competition — which consisted of the swimsuit competition, the evening gown competition, and the closed-door interview determined the first fifteen semi-finalists who advanced at the first cut. The sixteenth finalist was determined through an online vote from the viewing public. During the final competition, the top sixteen competed in swimsuit, and the top ten in evening gown. The top five format returned for the first time since Miss USA 2015, where the five finalists competed in two question rounds. The winner and her runners-up were determined by a panel of judges.

=== Selection committee ===
- Carolyn Aronson – businesswoman and hairstylist
- Lynnette Cole – Miss USA 2000 from Tennessee
- Abby Hornacek – Fox Nation journalist and media personality
- Gloria Mayfield Banks – motivational speaker, author, and entrepreneur
- Kimberly Pressler – Miss USA 1999 from New York
- Susan Yara – businesswoman and social media personality

== Contestants ==
Fifty-one contestants competed for the title.

State/district	Contestant	Age (Note: Ages at the time of the pageant)	Hometown	Notes
Alabama	Kelly Hutchinson	23	Auburn	Previously Miss Georgia's Outstanding Teen 2013
Alaska	Hannah Carlile	25	Fairbanks	
Arizona	Yesenia Vidales	24	Phoenix	
Arkansas	Haley Pontius	24	Houston	
California	Allyshia Gupta	26	Los Angeles	Later contestant on season 29 of The Bachelor
Colorado	Emily DeMure	22	Boulder	Later crowned Miss Grand United States of America 2022
Connecticut	Chelsea Demby	24	Farmington	
Delaware	Katie Guevarra	27	Middletown	
District of Columbia	Cierra Jackson	28	Washington, D.C.	Previously Miss District of Columbia 2016
Florida	Monique Evans	28	Naples	Previously Miss Texas 2014
Georgia	Alyssa Beasley	22	Brunswick	Previously Miss Georgia 2017
Hawaii	Samantha Neyland	24	Honolulu	First African-American Miss Hawaii USA; Previously Miss Hawaii Teen USA 2013
Idaho	Kim Layne	26	Nampa	Previously Miss Idaho Teen USA 2012
Illinois	Olivia Pura	22	Chicago	Previously Miss Illinois Teen USA 2016
Indiana	Alexis Lete	24	New Albany	
Iowa	Morgan Kofoid	23	Leon	Previously Miss Iowa Teen USA 2013
Kansas	Hayden Brax	21	Leawood	
Kentucky	Lexie Iles	24	Louisville	
Louisiana	Mariah Clayton	24	Zachary	
Maine	Julia Van Steenberghe	22	Old Town	
Maryland	Taelyr Robinson	28	Annapolis	Starred in The Vineyard
Massachusetts	Sabrina Victor	23	Brockton	
Michigan	Chanel Johnson	27	Detroit	
Minnesota	Taylor Fondie	22	Blaine	Former Minnesota Vikings Cheerleader
Mississippi	Asya Branch	22	Booneville	First African-American Miss Mississippi USA; Previously Miss Mississippi 2018
Missouri	Megan Renee Kelly	24	Kansas City	
Montana	Merissa Underwood	28	Missoula	
Nebraska	Megan Swanson	27	Omaha	Previously Miss Nebraska 2014; Sister of Allie Swanson, Miss Nebraska 2019
Nevada	Victoria Olona	27	Las Vegas	Fan vote winner
New Hampshire	Alyssa Fernandes	26	Merrimack	
New Jersey	Gina Mellish	21	Oceanport	Previously Miss New Jersey Teen USA 2016
New Mexico	Cecilia Rodriguez	28	Las Cruces	
New York	Andreia Gibau	25	Brooklyn	Previously Miss Earth United States 2017
North Carolina	Jane Axhoj	22	Charlotte	Previously Miss North Carolina Teen USA 2015
North Dakota	Macy Christianson	24	Minot	Previously Miss North Dakota 2016
Ohio	Sthephanie Miranda	27	Campbell	Later Top 6 at Miss Universe Puerto Rico 2021
Oklahoma	Mariah Jane Davis	24	Norman	
Oregon	Katerina Villegas	27	Hillsboro	
Pennsylvania	Victoria Piekut	24	Pittsburgh	
Rhode Island	Jonét Nichelle	25	North Providence	Former New England Patriots Cheerleader
South Carolina	Hannah Jane Curry	21	Greenville	
South Dakota	Kalani Jorgensen	26	Sioux Falls	Previously Miss South Dakota Teen USA 2012
Tennessee	Justice Enlow	26	Nashville	
Texas	Taylor Kessler	24	Houston	
Utah	Rachel Slawson	25	Provo	First openly LGBT person to compete at Miss USA
Vermont	Shannah Weller	24	Middlebury	
Virginia	Susie Evans	27	Poquoson	Previously Miss Virginia Teen USA 2011; Later winner of season 26 of The Bachelor
Washington	Imani Blackmon	25	Tacoma	Previously Miss Washington Teen USA 2013.
West Virginia	Charlotte Bellotte	26	Charles Town	
Wisconsin	Gabriella Deyi	28	Madison	
Wyoming	Lexi Revelli	26	Lyman	Originally first runner-up, but assumed the title after winner Katie Bozner resigned the title three weeks before Miss USA due to her academic obligations.
