= Flickinger =

Flickinger is a surname. Notable people with the surname include:

- Andy Flickinger (born 1978), French cyclist
- Daniel Flickinger, audio engineer
- Daniel Kumler Flickinger (1824–1911), American bishop
- Don Flickinger (1907–1997), American surgeon
- Grace Mary Flickinger SBS (1935–2024), American biology professor
- Hali Flickinger (born 1994), American swimmer
- Jacob Flickinger, a victim of the 2024 World Central Kitchen aid convoy attack
- Jason Flickinger (born 1977), American rower

== See also ==
- Burt Flickinger Center, a sports venue in Buffalo, New York, United States
- Flickinger Center for Performing Arts, a theater in Alamogordo, New Mexico, United States
