= Miss USA 1984 =

33rd Miss USA pageant

- Date: May 17, 1984
- Presenters: Bob Barker
- Venue: Lakeland Civic Auditorium, Lakeland, Florida
- Broadcaster: CBS; WTVT; WCPX
- Entrants: 53
- Placements: 10
- Debuts: Miss Teen USA 1983; Miss Teen USA 1984
- Winner: Mai Shanley; New Mexico
- Congeniality: Diane Gadoury; New Hampshire
- Photogenic: Laura Shaw; Texas

Miss USA 1984 was the 33rd Miss USA pageant, televised live from Lakeland Civic Auditorium, Lakeland, Florida on May 17, 1984. At the conclusion of the final competition, Mai Shanley of New Mexico was crowned Miss USA 1984. The outgoing titleholder was Julie Hayek of California.

The pageant was hosted by Bob Barker. It was the first time the pageant had been held in Florida since 1971, the last time the pageant had been held in its old home of Miami Beach.

In an odd occurrence, both women in the top two had previously competed at Miss America, neither one of whom placed at that pageant.

Miss USA 1984 Titlecard

== Results ==
=== Placements ===
Final results	Contestant
Miss USA 1984	New Mexico – Mai Shanley
1st Runner-Up	West Virginia – Kelly Anderson
2nd Runner-Up	Tennessee – Desiree Daniels
3rd Runner-Up	Missouri – Sandra Percival
4th Runner-Up	(Washington, D.C.) District of Columbia – Steffanee Leaming
Top 10	Illinois – LaVonne Misselle; North Carolina – Cookie Noak; Oklahoma – Julia Murdock; Oregon – Debbie Epperson; Texas – Laura Shaw

== Delegates ==
The Miss USA 1984 delegates were:

- Alabama – Kelly Flowers
- Alaska – Sherri McNealley
- Arizona – Daria Joi Sparling
- Arkansas – Shelly Boyd
- California - Theresa Ring
- Colorado – Michelle Anderson
- Connecticut – Lynne Scalo
- Delaware – Denise Lennick
- (Washington, D.C.) District of Columbia – Steffanee Leaming
- Florida – Stacy Hassfurder
- (Georgia (U.S. state)) Georgia – Jaynie Poteet
- Hawaii – Puna Stillman
- Idaho – Valencia Bilyeu
- Illinois – LaVonne Ranae Misselle
- Indiana – Susan Willardo
- Iowa – Michelle Boisvert
- Kansas – Elizabeth Johnson
- Kentucky – Tammy Melendez
- Louisiana – Rusanne Jourdan
- Maine – Vickie Lynn Gay
- Maryland – Betty Cook
- Massachusetts – Deborah Neary
- Michigan – Adriana Krambeck
- Minnesota – Martha Mork
- Mississippi – Carla Green
- Missouri – Sandy Percival
- Montana – Kristi Ogren
- Nebraska – Joni Rundall
- Nevada – Donna Lee McNeil
- New Hampshire – Diane Gadoury
- New Jersey – Diane Everett Qualter
- New Mexico – Mai Shanley
- (New York (state)) New York – Caroline Flury
- North Carolina – Cookie Noak
- North Dakota – Suzanne Lewis
- Ohio – Roxi Erwin
- Oklahoma – Julia Murdock
- Oregon – Debbie Epperson
- Pennsylvania – Tina Albright
- Rhode Island – Debbie Mowry
- South Carolina – Ginger Greer
- South Dakota – Donna Smith
- Tennessee – Desiree Daniels
- Texas – Laura Shaw
- Utah – Michele Lynn Brown
- Vermont – Sue O'Brien
- Virginia – Leah Rush
- (Washington (state)) Washington – Sue Gerrish
- West Virginia – Kelly Anderson
- Wisconsin – Tamara Schoof
- Wyoming – Cheryl Rawson

== Judges ==
- Jim Craig
- Ana Colon
- Ralph Wolfe Cowan
- Ann Kirsten Klendshoj
- Billy Hufsey
- Kim Seelbrede — Miss USA 1981 from Ohio
- Tony Dorsett
- David Mason Daniels
- Catherine Hickland
- Irving Mansfield
- Vicki Lawrence
