= Miss USA 1983 =

32nd Miss USA pageant

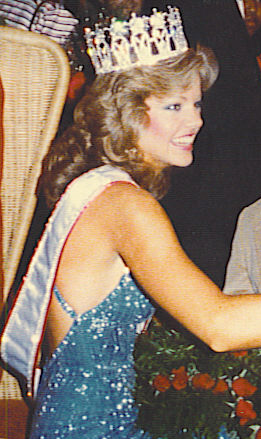
- Julie Hayek after being crowned as Miss USA
- Date: May 12, 1983
- Presenters: Bob Barker and Joan Van Ark
- Entertainment: Larry Gatlin and The Gatlin Brothers
- Venue: Knoxville Civic Auditorium and Coliseum, Knoxville, Tennessee
- Broadcaster: CBS, WBIR-TV
- Winner: Julie Hayek; California
- Congeniality: Dana Ruth Mintzer; Iowa
- Photogenic: Lisa Allred; Texas

Miss USA 1983 was the 32nd Miss USA pageant, televised live from the Knoxville Civic Center in Knoxville, Tennessee, on May 12, 1983. At the conclusion of the final competition, Julie Hayek of California was crowned Miss USA 1983 by outgoing titleholder Terri Utley of Arkansas. Hayek was the first runner up at Miss Universe 1983.

The pageant was hosted by Bob Barker, with color commentary from Joan Van Ark. It was held in Tennessee for the only time, while Miss Teen USA 1984 did the same thing in Memphis on the other side of the state.

== Results ==
=== Placements ===
Final results	Contestant
Miss USA 1983	California – Julie Hayek
1st Runner-Up	Texas – Lisa Allred
2nd Runner-Up	South Carolina – Allison Grisso
3rd Runner-Up	Louisiana – Pamela Jo Forrest
4th Runner-Up	North Dakota – Elizabeth Jaeger
Top 12	Oklahoma – Mignon Merchant; Nevada – Christa Daniel; (Washington (state)) Washington – Kathi Tucker; Michigan – Kimberly Mexicotte; Pennsylvania – Julie Page; (Georgia (U.S. state)) Georgia – Dotsy Timm; (New York (state)) New York – Jennifer Mikelinich

=== Special awards ===
- Miss Congeniality: Dana Ruth Mintzer ( Iowa)
- Miss Photogenic: Lisa Allred ( Texas)
- Best State Costume: Julie Page ( Pennsylvania)

== Delegates ==
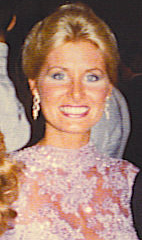
Lisa Allred (Texas), first runner-up

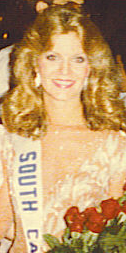
Allison Grisso (South Carolina), second runner-up

The Miss USA 1983 delegates were:

- Alabama – Teri Lane
- Alaska – Amy Harms
- Arizona – Sindy Hedden
- Arkansas – Debra Baltz
- California – Julie Hayek
- Colorado – Lisa Gay Trujillo
- Connecticut – Mary Lynn Seleman
- Delaware – Shelley Perkins
- (Washington, D.C.) District of Columbia – Julie Warner
- Florida – Janet Chesser
- (Georgia (U.S. state)) Georgia – Dotsy Timm
- Hawaii – Zoe Roach
- Idaho – Kerry Damiano
- Illinois – Vanessa Romine
- Indiana – Toni Yudt
- Iowa – Dana Ruth Mintzer
- Kansas – Renee Ruch
- Kentucky – Lee Ann Austin
- Louisiana – Pamela Jo Forrest
- Maine – Rosemarie Hemond
- Maryland – Shawn Keller
- Massachusetts – Robin Silva
- Michigan – Kimberly Mexicotte
- Minnesota – Carolyn Mattson
- Mississippi – Becky Case (Miss United Teenager 1979)
- Missouri – Robin Riley
- Montana – Barbara Bowman
- Nebraska – Penelope Boynton
- Nevada – Christa Daniel
- New Hampshire – Lynn Stockwell
- New Jersey – Ann Marie Brucato
- New Mexico – Kristin Larsen
- (New York (state)) New York – Jennifer Mikelinich
- North Carolina – Allison Pinson
- North Dakota – Elizabeth Jaeger
- Ohio – Gina Gangale
- Oklahoma – Mignon Merchant
- Oregon – Shelly Kiser
- Pennsylvania – Julie Page
- Rhode Island – Allegra Hendricks
- South Carolina – Allison Grisso
- South Dakota – Kelly Rosenbaum
- Tennessee – Ladonna Jean Friday
- Texas – Lisa Allred
- Utah – Launa Lewis
- Vermont – Leslie Lucchina
- Virginia – Tanquil Collins
- (Washington (state)) Washington – Kathi Tucker
- West Virginia – Jill Rigsby
- Wisconsin – Susan Peters
- Wyoming – Joanie Engstrom

== Contestant notes ==
- Dana Ruth Mintzer (Iowa), won Miss Congeniality at both the state and national competition, 1983
- Lisa Allred (Texas), 1st runner-up, went on to compete in Miss World 1983
- Four contestants went on to compete in the Miss America pageant:
  - Elizabeth Jaegar (North Dakota) – Miss North Dakota 1985
  - Mignon Merchant (Oklahoma) – Miss Oklahoma 1986
  - Robin Riley (Missouri) – Miss Missouri 1987 (top 10 at Miss America 1988)
  - Joanne Stanulonis Justina (Connecticut) – Miss Connecticut 1983 (last 10 at Miss America 1984)

== Judges ==
- Monique Van Vooren
- John Goodis
- Kim Seelbrede — Miss USA 1981 from Ohio
- Ed Marinaro
- Maxine Messinger
- Kevin Conway
- Barbara Peterson — Miss USA 1976 from Minnesota
- Vince Ferragamo
- Joanie Greggains
- Harry Blackstone Jr.
- Chico Hamilton
