= Miss Arkansas USA =

Beauty pageant competition

- Formation: 1952
- Type: Beauty pageant
- Headquarters: Shawnee
- Location: Kansas
- Members: Miss USA
- Official language: English
- Key people: John M. Vannatta; Jason Vannatta; Jennifer Vannatta-Fisher
- Website: Official website

Miss Arkansas USA, previously known as Miss Arkansas Universe, is the beauty pageant that selects the representative for the state of Arkansas in the Miss USA pageant, and the name of the title held by that winner. The pageant is directed by Vanbros and Associates.

Arkansas's most successful placement was in 1982, when Terri Utley was crowned Miss USA. The most recent placement was Olivia Halsey in 2025 who placed in the Top 20. Nine Miss Arkansas USA titleholders were former Miss Arkansas Teen USA titleholders who competed at Miss Teen USA. The longest reigning titleholder was Haley Rose Pontius in 2020, having held the title for 18 months, while the shortest titleholder was Stephanie Barber in 2021, having held the title for 10 months and 18 days.

The state pageant was directed by Premier Pageants from 2002 to 2007 before becoming part of the Vanbros organization, headquartered in Lenexa, Kansas. In 2018, Vanbros chose Fort Smith, Arkansas as the new host city of the pageant. Other host cities for the pageant have included Bentonville, Little Rock, Magnolia, and West Memphis.

The current Miss Arkansas USA is Anna Claire Hay of Fayetteville who was crowned on May 3, 2026, at The Center for the Arts in Russellville. She will represent Arkansas at Miss USA 2026.

== Gallery of titleholders ==
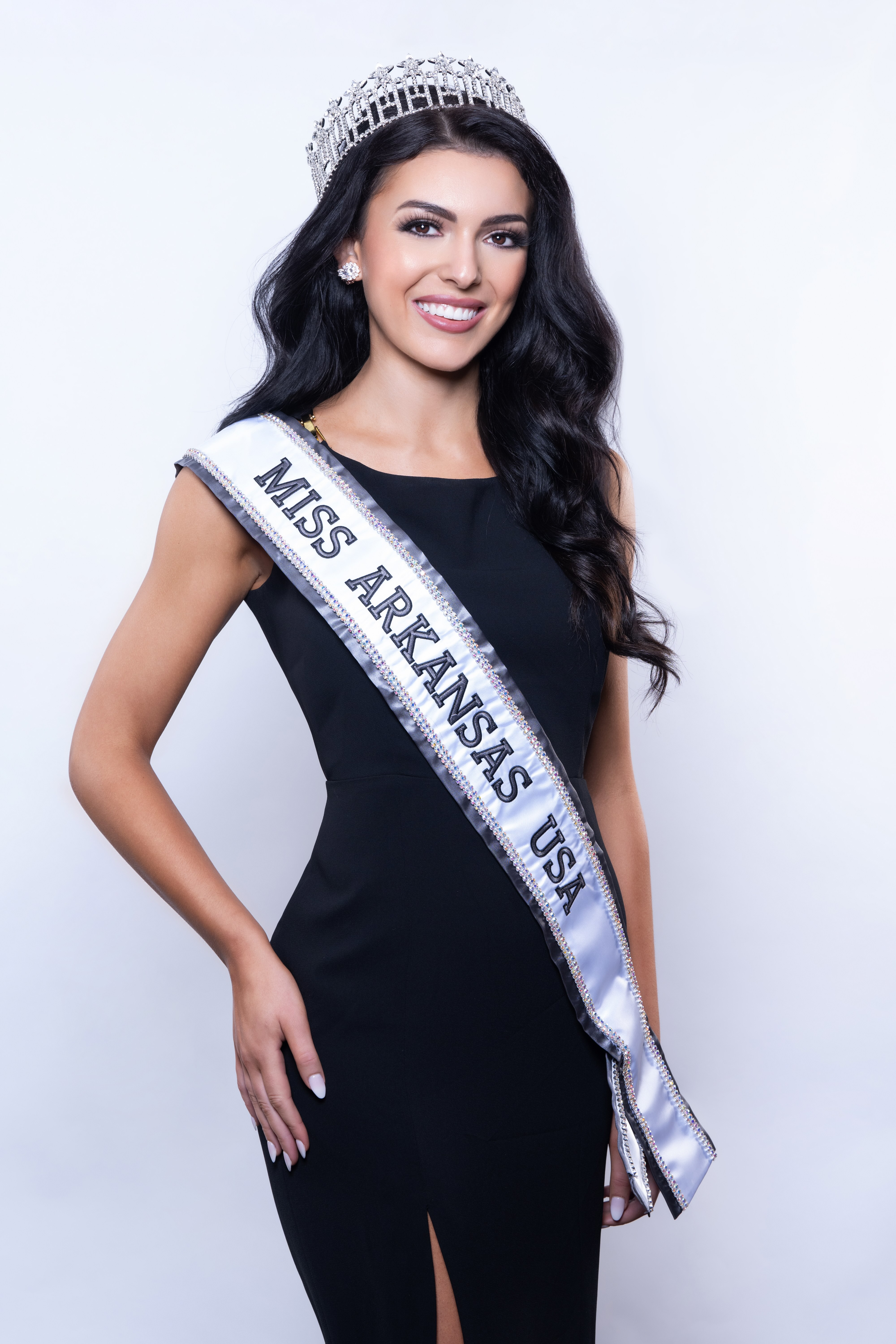
Stephanie Barber, Miss Arkansas USA 2021

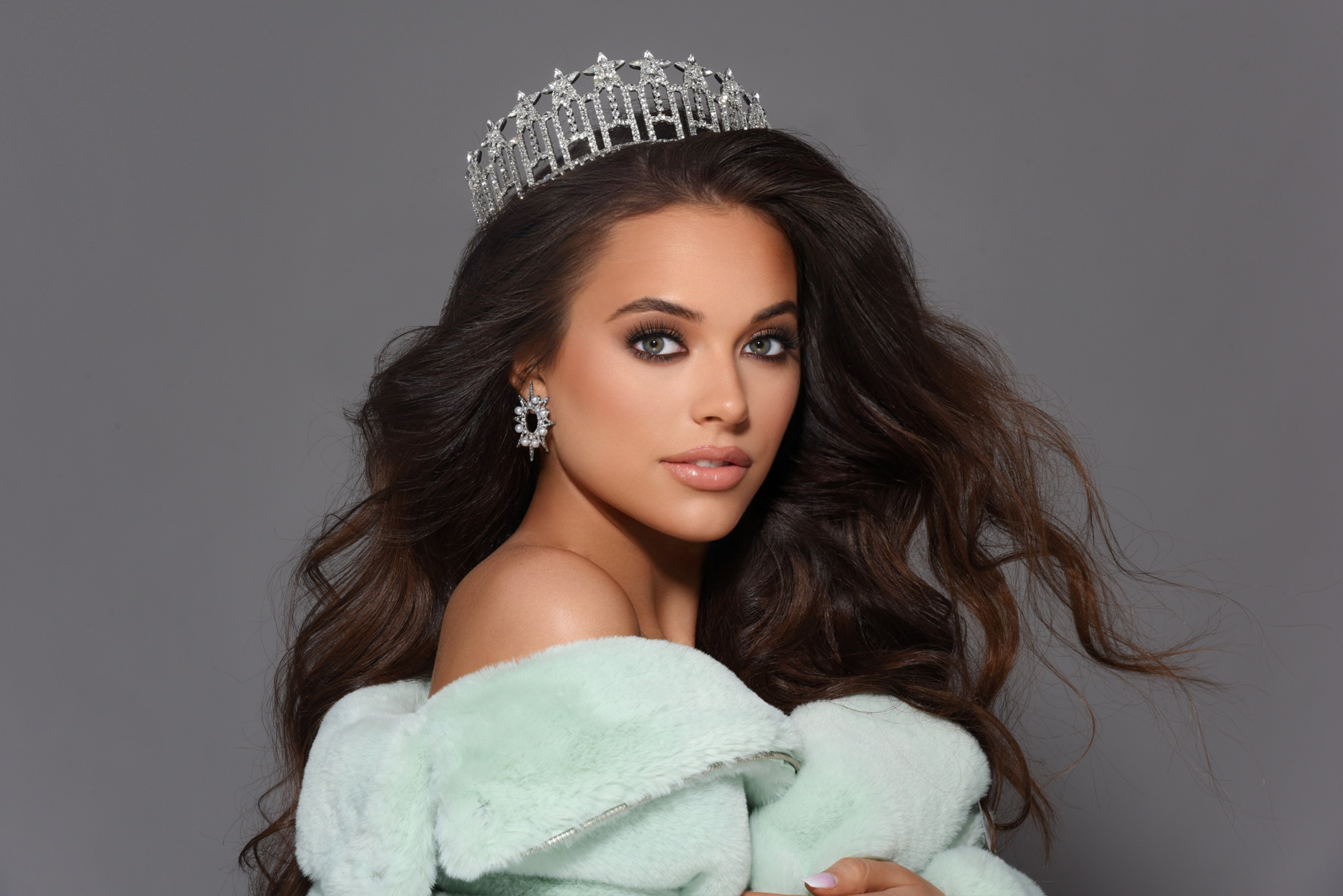
Haley Pontius, Miss Arkansas USA 2020

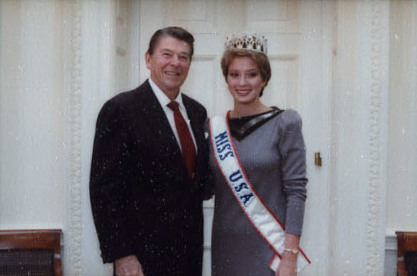
Terri Utley, Miss Arkansas USA 1982 and Miss USA 1982

== Results summary ==
=== Placements ===
- Miss USA: Terri Utley (1982)
- 1st Runner-Up: Margaret Haywood (1955)
- 2nd Runner-Up: Nancy McCollum (1956)
- Top 5: Savannah Skidmore (2019)
- Top 10: Chanley Painter (2009), Abby Floyd (2016)
- Top 15/16/20: Waydine Nesbitt (1954), Helen Garrott (1957), Donna Needham (1959), Ann Smithwick (1968), Mary Dial (1970), Jessica Furrer (2005), Adrielle Churchill (2010), Kelsey Dow (2012), Mackenzie Hinderberger (2023), Olivia Halsey (2025)

Arkansas holds a record of 16 placements at Miss USA.

=== Awards ===
- Miss Photogenic: Jennifer Sherrill (2004)
- Miss Congeniality: Madeline Bohlman (2024)

== Winners ==
Color key

- Winner
- Runner-Up
- Semifinalist

Year	Name	Hometown	Age (Note: Age at the time of the crowning)	Local title	Placement at Miss USA	Special awards at Miss USA	Notes
2026	Anna Claire Hay	Fayetteville	22	Miss Razorback			Previously Miss Arkansas Teen USA 2020; Top 16 at Miss Teen USA 2020; Previously Miss International 2023
2025	Olivia Halsey	Jonesboro	25	Miss West Little Rock	Top 20		
2024	Madeline Bohlman	Fayetteville	22	Miss Northwest Arkansas		Miss Congeniality	Previously Miss Arkansas Teen USA 2021; Cousin of Madison Marsh, Miss America 2024
2023	Mackenzie Elizabeth Hinderberger	Farmington	23	Miss Farmington	Top 20		Previously Miss Arkansas Teen USA 2018
2022	Rylie Wagner	Ozark	21	Miss Ozark			
2021	Stephanie Barber	Fayetteville	22	Miss Northwest Arkansas			Shortest reigning Miss Arkansas USA
2020	Haley Rose Pontius	Houston	23	Miss Richland Hills			Previously Miss Teen International 2013 and IJM International Miss 2017; Longest reigning Miss Arkansas USA
2019	Savannah Jera Skidmore	Calico Rock	23	Miss White River	Top 5		Previously Miss Arkansas 2016 after Savvy Shields was crowned Miss America 2017
2018	Lauren Ashton Weaver	Greenwood	21	Miss Greenwood			Previously Miss Arkansas Teen USA 2014
2017	Arynn Nicole Johnson	Hot Springs	19	Miss Hot Springs			Previously Miss Arkansas Teen USA 2015; Top 15 semi-finalist at Miss Teen USA 2015
2016	Abby Elizabeth Floyd	Searcy	19	Miss Searcy	Top 10		Previously Miss Arkansas Teen USA 2013; Semi-finalist at Miss Teen USA 2013; Married to former NFL player Phillip Supernaw
2015	Leah Michele Blefko	Fayetteville	21	Miss White River			
2014	Helen Elizabeth Wisner	Fayetteville	25	Miss White River			
2013	Hannah Love Billingsley	Franklin	22	Miss North Arkansas			Married to Shay Mooney of Dan + Shay
2012	Kelsey Rhea Dow	Jonesboro	21	Miss Craighead County	Top 16		
2011	Courtney Lakynn McBride	White Hall	20	Miss Central Arkansas			
2010	Adrielle Lynn Churchill	Dover	24	Miss White River	Top 15		Previously National Sweetheart 2005
2009	Chanley Shá Painter	Conway	24	Miss Conway	Top 10		
2008	Rachel Dianne Howells	Alma	21	Miss Washington County			
2007	Kelly George	Sherwood	24				Contestant at National Sweetheart 2004 as Miss Maryland
2006	Kimberly Forsyth	Cabot	26				
2005	Jessica Furrer	Conway	22		Top 15		
2004	Jennifer DeAnn Sherrill	Sherwood	19			Miss Photogenic	
2003	Taylor Marie Carlisle	Jacksonville	21				
2002	Amber Nicole Boatman	Norphlet	23				
2001	Jessie Davis	Harrison					
2000	Whitney Lea Moore	Cabot	22				
1999	Allison Nicole Heavener	Batesville	22				
1998	Kami Mikhael Tice	Huntsville	21				First runner-up at Miss Arkansas USA 1997
1997	Tamara Henry	Little Rock	25				
1996	Tiffany Brooke Parks	Cabot	20	Miss Boston Mountain			Previously Miss Arkansas Teen USA 1993
1995	Kristen Bettis						
1994	Hannah Hillyard	Little Rock					
1993	Katherine Leigh "Kati" Fish	Hot Springs					First runner-up at Miss Arkansas 1991
1992	Jona Garner						
1991	Angela Rockwell						
1990	Kathryn Grace Harris	Pine Bluff	18				
1989	Paige Ann Yandell	Greenwood					Previously Miss Arkansas Teen USA 1987
1988	Melissa Anne Staples	Calion	20				Previously Miss Arkansas Teen USA 1984
1987	Sheri Donette Smeltzer	Smackover	23				Fourth runner-up at Miss Arkansas 1984; First runner-up at Miss Arkansas 1985; Top 11 at Miss Arkansas 1986
1986	Rhonda Blaylock	Springdale	22				
1985	Susan Caroline Dean	Osceola	23				
1984	Michelle A. "Shelly" Boyd	Manila	21				Second runner-up at Miss Arkansas USA 1983
1983	Debra "Debbie" Baltz	Paris	23				
1982	Leanne Derryberry	Jerusalem			did not compete		Originally first runner-up, assumed the title when Terri Utley won Miss USA; Twin sister of Lynnanne Derryberry, Miss Arkansas USA 1981
1982	Terri Lea Utley	Cabot	20		Miss USA 1982		Third runner-up at Miss Arkansas USA 1981
1981	Lynnanne Derryberry	Jerusalem	18				
1980	Susie Owens	Jacksonville	21				
1979	Cynthia LaFran Caldwell	Jacksonville	21				
1978	Donna Funderburk	El Dorado	22				
1977	Debra Lynn Duree	Texarkana					
1976	Sonia Kay Jines	Conway					
1975	Robin Fields	Hot Springs	18				
1974	Gina Huddle						
1973	Christal Phiffer	Texarkana					
1972	Susan Tichenor	Pine Bluff	21				
1971	Paula Keith	Little Rock	20				
1970	Mary Jane Dial	Malvern	21		Top 15		
1969	Leonette Reed	Heber Springs					
1968	Ann Smithwick	Jacksonville	19		Top 15	Top 15 Best in Swimsuit	
1967	Katy Lou Wurst	Fort Smith	19				
1966	Peggy Jean Jones	Green Forest					
1965	Jeri Haynie	El Dorado					
1964	Barbara McGlothlin						
1963	Cheryl Jane Bechtelheimer	Camden					2nd runner up at Miss American Beauty 1964 (Title for US Rep to Miss International pageant)
1962	Linda Riggan	Leola					
1961	Mickey Lambert						
1960	Gene Chambers	Danville					Married to Jerry Jones, owner of the Dallas Cowboys
1959	Donna Sue Needham	Berryville	19		Top 15		
1958	Nancy Hill	Little Rock	19				
1957	Helen Elizabeth Garrott	West Memphis	19		Top 15		
1956	Nancy McCollum	Stuttgart	19		2nd Runner-Up		
1955	Margaret Anne Haywood	Jonesboro	19		1st Runner-Up		1st runner up at Miss World 1955 as Miss USA; 2nd runner-up Miss Dixie 1955
1954	Waydine Nesbitt	Magnolia	21		Top 21		
1953	Jackie Stucker	West Helena	19				
1952	Barbara Wathen	Jonesboro	20				
