= Miss USA 1982 =

31st Miss USA pageant

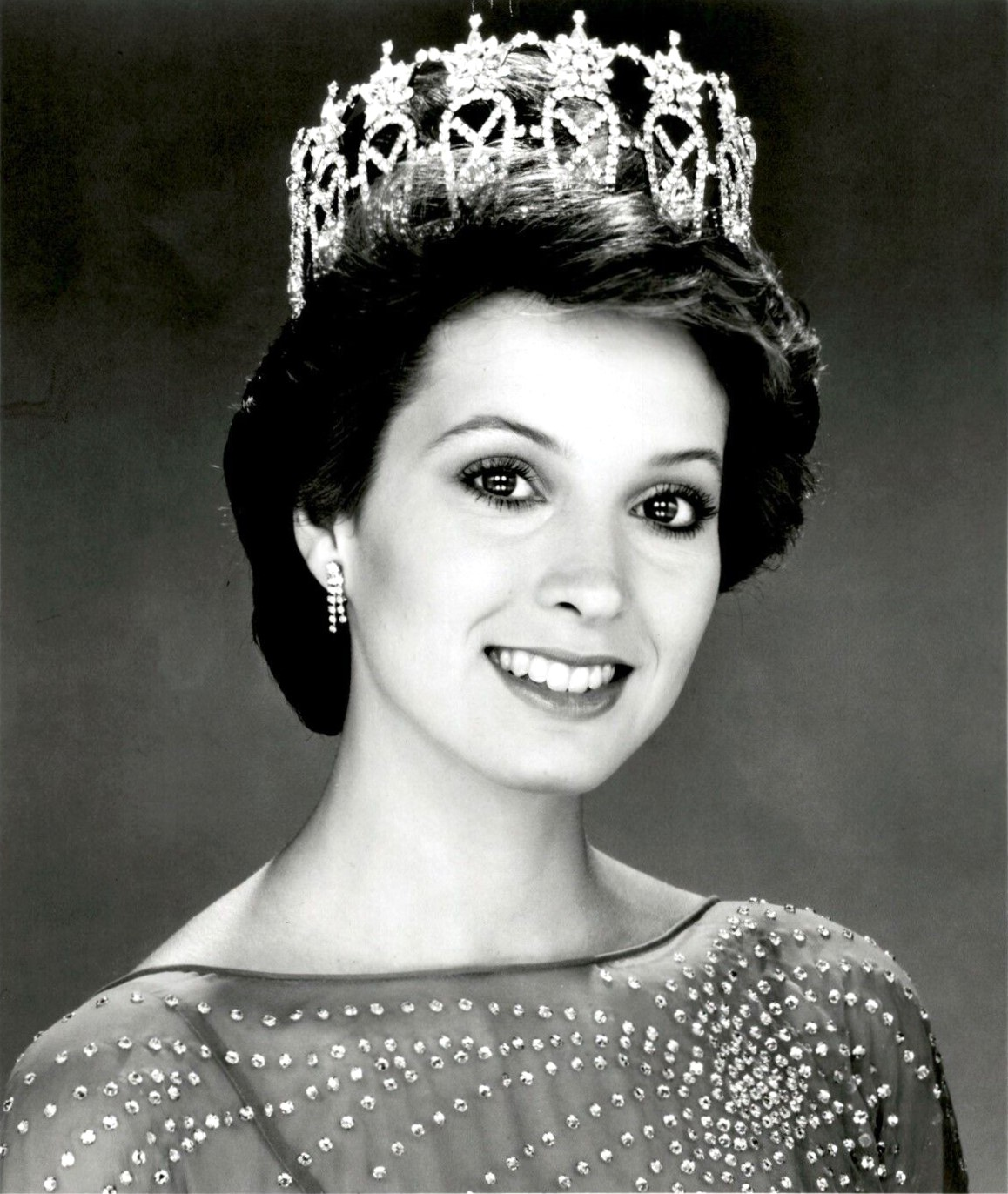
- Terri Utley wearing the Miss USA 1982 crown
- Date: May 13, 1982
- Presenters: Bob Barker
- Venue: Gulf Coast Convention Center, Biloxi, Mississippi
- Broadcaster: CBS, WJTV
- Entrants: 51
- Placements: 12
- Winner: Terri Utley; Arkansas
- Congeniality: Toni McFadden; Alaska
- Photogenic: Sondra Dee Jones; Virginia

Miss USA 1982 was the 31st Miss USA pageant, televised live on May 13, 1982, from the Gulf Coast Convention Center in Biloxi, Mississippi on CBS.

The pageant was won by Terri Utley of Arkansas, who was crowned by outgoing titleholder Kim Seelbrede of Ohio. Utley was the first – and to date (as of 2023) only – woman from Arkansas to win the Miss USA title, and went on to place as 4th runner-up at Miss Universe 1982.

The judges included Miss USA 1975 Summer Bartholomew and Miss USA 1980 Jineane Ford.

Jeannine Boger, who was Miss North Carolina USA is the mother of Miss USA 2009 Kristen Dalton.

== Results ==
=== Placements ===
Final results	Contestant
Miss USA 1982	Arkansas – Terri Utley
1st Runner-up	Texas – Luann Caughey
2nd Runner-up	Utah – Susan Gasser
3rd Runner-up	Ohio – Kim Weeda
4th Runner-up	Kentucky – Kristina Chapman
Top 12	Hawaii – Vanessa Dubois; Maryland – Angie Boyer; Massachusetts – Janet Marie Flaherty; Michigan – Diane Arabia; Tennessee – Sherly Deanice "Nise" Levy; Vermont – Georgia Davis; Virginia – Sondra Dee Jones

=== Special awards ===
Award	Contestant
Miss Congeniality	Alaska – Toni McFadden
Miss Photogenic	Virginia – Sondra Dee Jones
Best State Costume	Ohio – Kim Weeda

== Delegates ==
The Miss USA 1982 delegates were:

- Alabama – Lisa Wheeler
- Alaska – Toni McFadden
- Arizona – Lori Hakola
- Arkansas – Terri Utley
- California – Suzanne Dewames
- Colorado – Dusty Hutton
- Connecticut – Maureen Szekeres
- Delaware – Shawna Saints
- (Washington, D.C.) District of Columbia – Lori Esteep
- Florida – Lisa Smith
- (Georgia (U.S. state)) Georgia – Kelly Blackston
- Hawaii – Vanessa Dubois
- Idaho – Valerie Stephan
- Illinois – Carla Danielson
- Indiana – Sara Binckley
- Iowa – Jeanne Hoyer
- Kansas – Stefanie Larson
- Kentucky – Kristina Chapman
- Louisiana – Lisa Michael
- Maine – Theresa Cloutier
- Maryland – Angie Boyer
- Massachusetts – Janet Marie Flaherty
- Michigan – Diane Arabia
- Minnesota – Lori Kmetz
- Mississippi – Nancy Perkins
- Missouri – Susan Heiman
- Montana – Pierrette "Perri" Stevenson
- Nebraska – Lori Novicki
- Nevada – Andrea Pennington
- New Hampshire – Kathy Rogers
- New Jersey – Janice Lynn Straub
- New Mexico – Lisa Allen
- (New York (state)) New York – Annemarie Henderson
- North Carolina – Jeannine Dalton
- North Dakota – Tammi Martinson
- Ohio – Kim Weeda
- Oklahoma – Jill Liebmann
- Oregon – Kristina Bauer
- Pennsylvania – Therese Rosa
- Rhode Island – Peggy McGraw
- South Carolina – Margo Wood
- South Dakota – Meaghan North
- Tennessee – Sherly Deanice "Nise" Levy
- Texas – Luann Caughey
- Utah – Susan Gasser
- Vermont – Georgia Davis
- Virginia – Sondra Dee Jones
- (Washington (state)) Washington – Jana Minerich
- West Virginia – Cindy Baniak
- Wisconsin – Cheryl Maslowski
- Wyoming – Judy Wilder

== Judges ==
- Summer Bartholomew, Miss USA 1975 from California
- Vic Damone, singer
- Jineane Ford, Miss USA 1980 from Arizona
- Georgia Gibbs, singer
- John James, actor
- Julia Meade, actress
- Robert Pine, actor
- Freddie Solomon, NFL player
- Michelle Stevens, model
- Gordon Cooper, astronaut
