= Candice Bennatt =

American lawyer

- Born: Candice Marie Bennatt; 1989 (age 36–37); Houston, Texas, U.S.
- Height: 5 ft 6 in (1.68 m)
- Beauty pageant titleholder
- Title: Miss New Mexico 2012; Miss Louisiana USA 2015
- Hair color: Black
- Eye color: Brown
- Major competitions: Miss New Mexico 2012; (Winner); Miss America 2013; (Unplaced); Miss Louisiana USA 2015; (Winner); Miss USA 2015; (Top 11)

Candice Marie Bennatt (born 1989) is an American lawyer and beauty pageant titleholder who was crowned Miss New Mexico 2012 and represented New Mexico at Miss America 2013 but did not place. She was crowned Miss Louisiana USA 2015 and then represented Louisiana at Miss USA 2015 where she placed Top 11.

== Early life ==
Bennatt was born in 1989 in Houston to an Italian father and a Puerto Rican mother and raised in the neighborhood of Kingwood. She has been a cheerleader for the Houston Texans. She graduated from Kingwood High School and earned a bachelor's degree in biology with a minor in communications from Sam Houston State University; she is a graduate of Loyola University New Orleans with a degree in law and now runs a family law practice in Metairie, La.

Prior to the Miss USA pageant she was a promotional model and a past finalist in the Miss Darque Tan 2010 Model Search, and a past contestant with Bikini USA (2009). She was a past model with the Texas Bikini Team during the 2009/2010 season (appearing in the calendar and poster), and a past contestant for the Swimsuit USA Model Search in 2011 (placed in the first preliminary but withdrew from the state finals). As of 2015 she has disowned her past association with the promotional modeling she has done in the Houston, TX area.

== Pageantry ==
=== Early pageantry ===
Bennatt became Miss Albuquerque Outstanding Teen while in high school. She won Miss Dallas in November 2011 and competed in Miss Texas and placed 4th runner-up. She also won both the Preliminary Swimwear and Overall Swimwear competitions.

=== Miss America 2013 ===
Bennatt won Miss New Mexico in June 2012, after which she competed in Miss America 2013.

=== Miss USA 2015 ===
In October 2014 she was crowned Miss Louisiana USA 2015 and represented Louisiana at Miss USA 2015 where she competed to succeed the current titleholder, Nia Sanchez of Nevada, eventually finishing in the Top 11.

Awards and achievements
Preceded by Brittany Guidry	Miss Louisiana USA; 2015	Succeeded by Maaliyah Papillion
Preceded by Sarina Turnbull	Miss New Mexico; 2012	Succeeded by Alexis Duprey
