= Mai Shanley =

American model

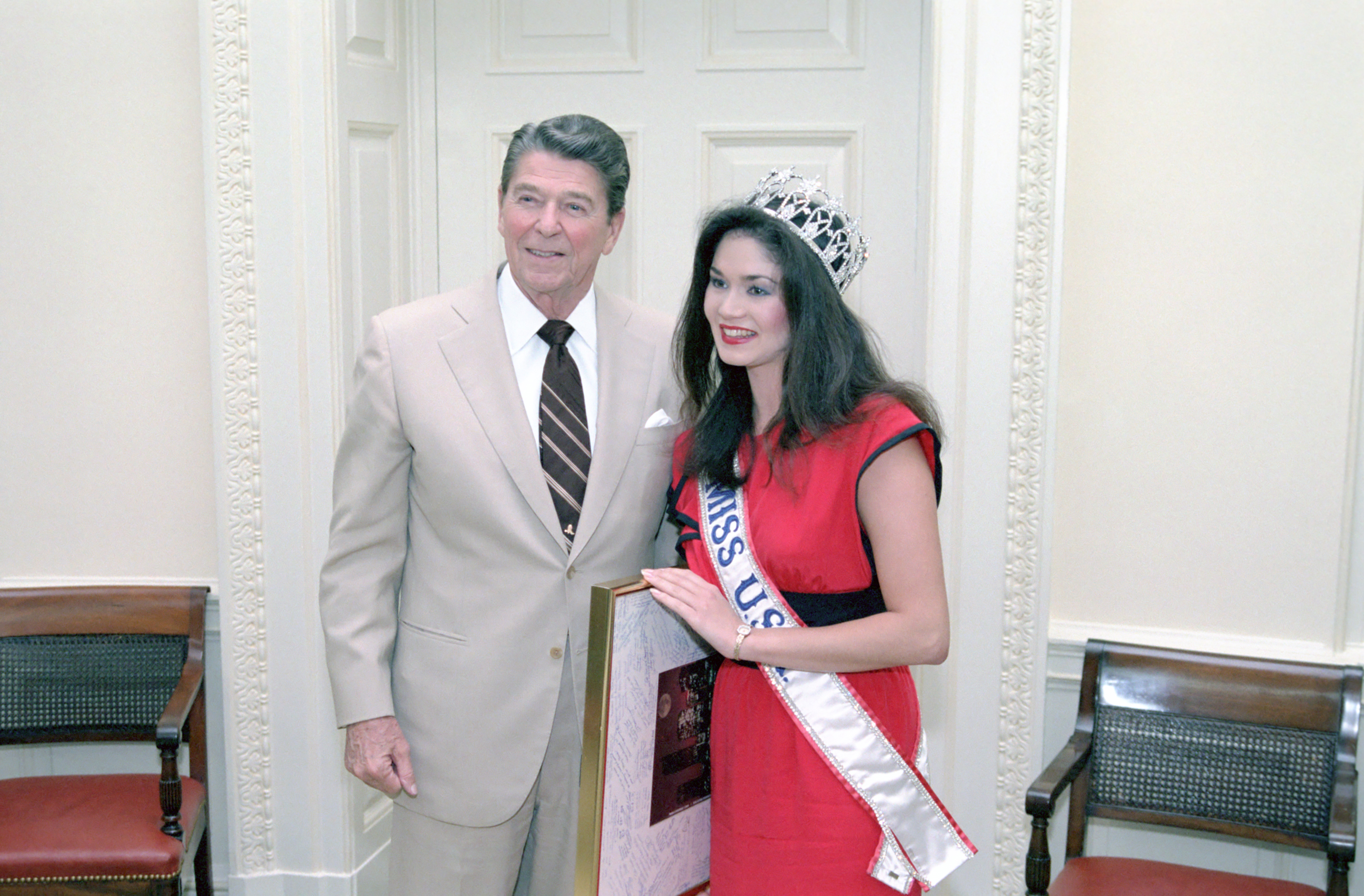
- Shanley with President Ronald Reagan on June 28th, 1984
- Born: Mai Therese Shanley; February 17, 1963 (age 63); New Mexico, U.S.
- Spouse: Mark Fitzgerald
- Beauty pageant titleholder
- Title: Miss New Mexico 1983; Miss New Mexico USA 1984; Miss USA 1984
- Major competitions: Miss New Mexico 1983 (Winner); Miss America 1984 (Unplaced); Miss New Mexico USA 1984 (Winner); Miss USA 1984 (Winner); Miss Universe 1984 (Top 10)

Mai Therese Shanley (born February 17, 1963) is an American model and beauty pageant titleholder who won Miss New Mexico 1983, Miss New Mexico USA 1984 and Miss USA 1984. She is also currently the only & first woman from New Mexico to win the Miss USA pageant.

== Biography ==
Her mother is ethnically Chinese and is from Taiwan, while her father is Irish and was born in Ireland. Shanley's first pageant experience came when she represented New Mexico in the Miss America pageant in 1983. She did not place in that pageant.

Later, Shanley became the first Eurasian delegate to win Miss USA. She was 21 at the time she was crowned the 33rd winner at the pageant held in Lakeland, Florida, on May 17, 1984. She also edged out two former Miss America state titleholders in the top five, Kelly Anderson (Miss West Virginia 1982) and Desiree Denise Daniels (Miss Tennessee 1982), who placed second and third, respectively.

Shanley went on to compete at the Miss Universe Pageant in Miami, FL in July 1984, where she was a semi-finalist. Her national costume was a Native American chief. She married pilot Mark Fitzgerald and has two daughters.

Preceded by Kristin Larsen	Miss New Mexico USA; 1984	Succeeded by Brenda Denton
Preceded by Cyndi Friesen	Miss New Mexico; 1983	Succeeded by Trina Collins
Preceded by Julie Hayek	Miss USA; 1984	Succeeded by Laura Martinez-Herring
