= Sharon Brown (Miss USA) =

American actress and beauty queen

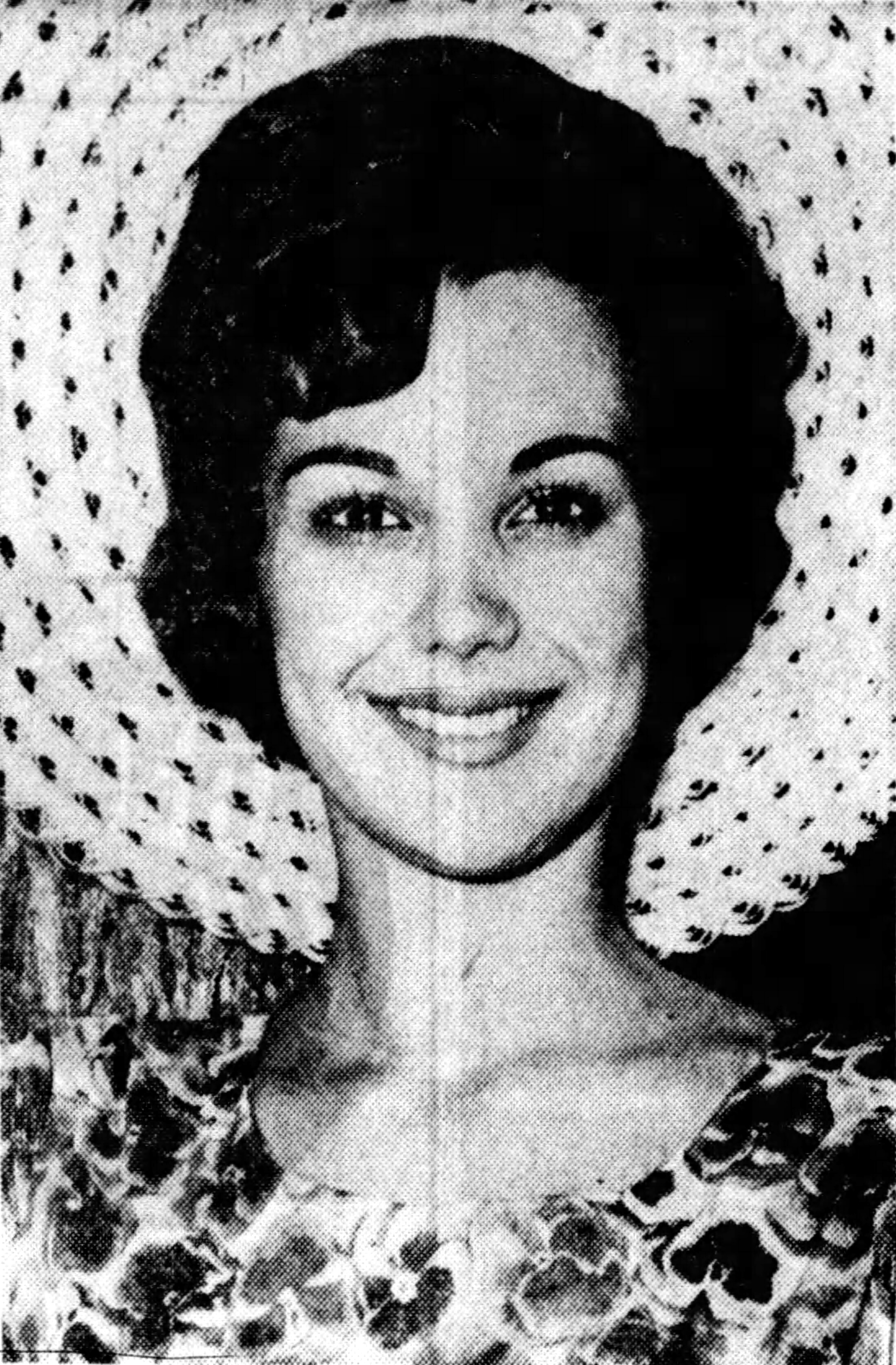
- Brown in 1961
- Born: Sharon Rene Brown; September 1, 1943 (age 83); Waterproof, Tensas Parish, Louisiana, U.S.
- Height: 5 ft 7 in (1.70 m)
- Beauty pageant titleholder
- Title: Miss Louisiana USA 1961; Miss USA 1961
- Hair color: Brown
- Eye color: Brown
- Major competitions: Miss Louisiana USA 1961 (Winner); Miss USA 1961 (Winner) (Miss Photogenic); Miss Universe 1961 (4th runner-up) (Miss Photogenic)

Sharon Rene Brown (born September 1, 1943) is an American actress and beauty pageant titleholder who was crowned Miss USA 1961 becoming the first Miss USA titleholder in history to win the pageant's Photogenic Award.

== Early life ==
Brown is originally from rural Waterproof in southern Tensas Parish in eastern Louisiana. She moved to Minden, the seat of government of Webster Parish in northwestern Louisiana, in the summer of 1961 with her parents. Her father, Roy L. Brown (1921–1978) is interred at the Minden Cemetery. Her mother, Pauline "Polly" Craft-Brown (1921-2010) is interred at Mulhearn Cemetery, Hwy. 80, Monroe, Louisiana. She has twin brothers, Gary Lemoyne (1948-2006) and Larry Roy Brown (born 1948), and a younger brother, Joe Michael Brown (1956). Her grandparents were James Corbett Craft (1882 - 1974) and Lula Maranda Prine-Craft (1899-2000) both interred in the same cemetery as Polly.

Brown attended Louisiana Tech University in Ruston, the seat of Lincoln Parish. She won the title of Miss Waterproof 1961 and was also Miss Louisiana Tech that year. She was a freshman at Louisiana Tech during the 1960–1961 school year. She was a high school cheerleader from 1958 to 1960.

== Miss USA ==
After winning the Miss Louisiana USA crown representing Minden, Brown captured the Miss USA crown, becoming the first Miss USA winner to obtain both the Photogenic award and Miss USA title. She was eighteen years old at the time and went on to place as fourth runner-up in Miss Universe 1961.

Celebrating Louisiana's second representative to achieve the title of Miss USA, Minden proclaimed July 25, 1961, as Sharon Brown Day. She was honored with a parade, a 23-jewel wrist watch, and a $500 money order.

== After Miss USA ==
After her Miss USA tenure ended, she pursued a free-lance modeling and television career in New York City.

In 1962, she was selected Queen of the 28th annual Sugar Bowl in New Orleans. She appeared on Bob Hope's NBC television program.

In 1978, she was living in Chicago, Illinois.
