= Julie Hayek =

American actress, model, and beauty pageant titleholder

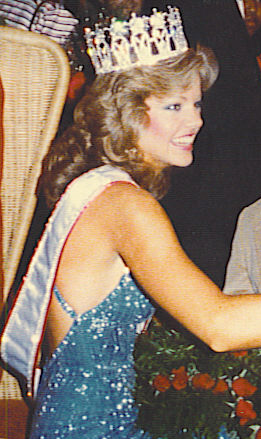
- Hayek after becoming Miss USA 1983
- Born: Julie Lynne Hayek; October 4, 1960 (age 66); La Cañada Flintridge, California, U.S.
- Height: 5 ft 10 in (1.78 m)
- Beauty pageant titleholder
- Title: Miss California USA 1983; Miss USA 1983
- Hair color: Blonde
- Eye color: Green
- Major competitions: Miss California USA 1983; (Winner); Miss USA 1983; (Winner); Miss Universe 1983; (1st Runner-Up)

Julie Lynne Hayek (born October 4, 1960) is an American actress, model, charity worker and beauty pageant titleholder who won Miss USA 1983. She represented the United States at Miss Universe 1983, and finished first runner-up.

== Early life ==
Hayek is of Czech and German descent on her father's side and Norwegian, Scottish, Irish, and English on her mother's side. Her father was an airline pilot and her mother a high school guidance counselor. She graduated from UCLA a year after holding the Miss USA title, with a bachelor's degree in biology and a minor in psychology.

While a student at UCLA, Hayek performed with the UCLA Showgirls dance team. After shooting a poster for 20th Century Fox, she was asked to do a screen test by Paramount Studios head of casting Rueben Cannon, and was subsequently featured in an NBC Nightly News story. She was prominently featured in a Sports Illustrated article about the UCLA Showgirls, Eight Beauties and a Beat.

== Miss USA ==
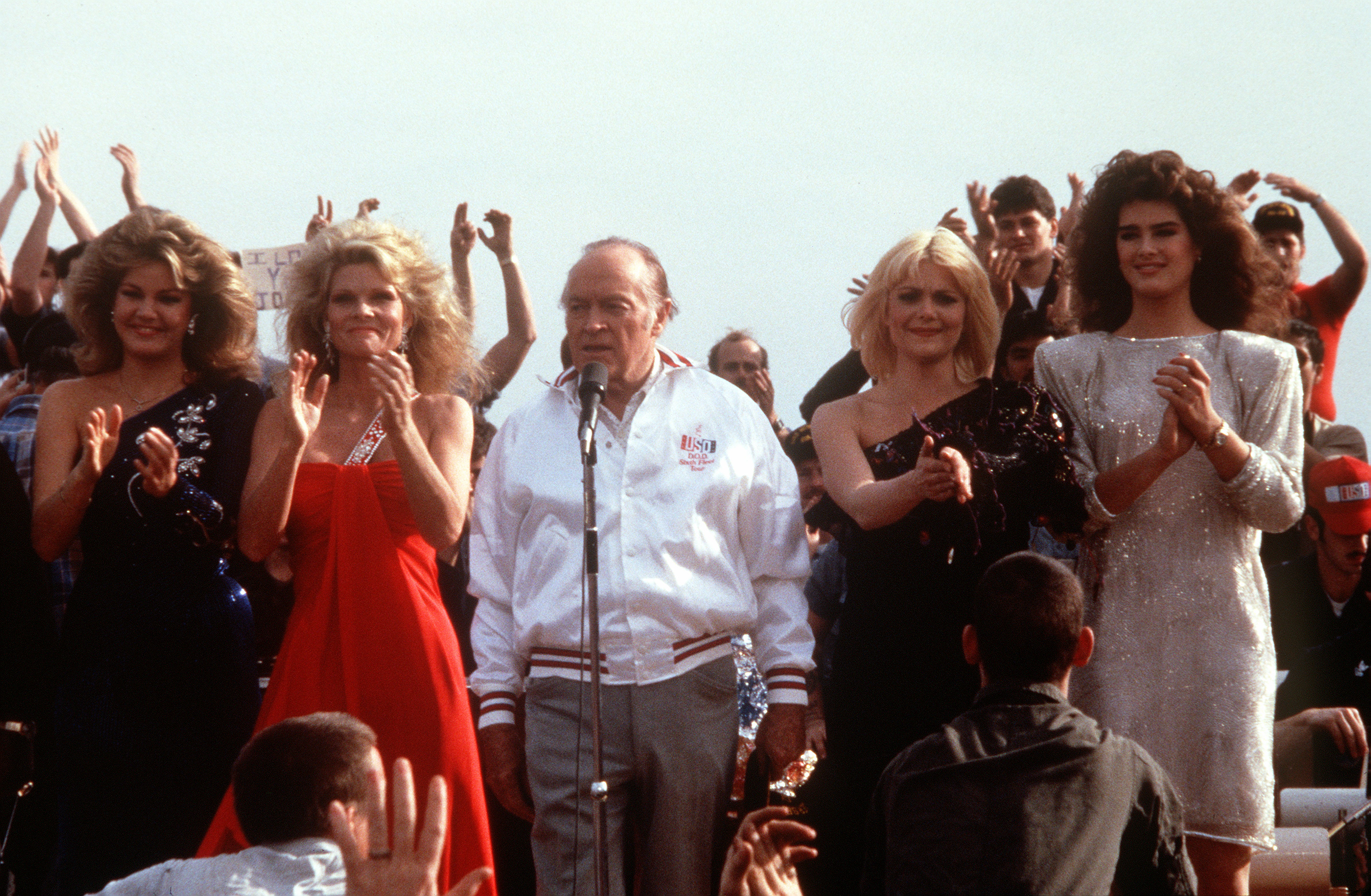
Entertainers during a Christmas Eve USO show in 1983 on board the USS New Jersey (BB-62) off the coast of Beirut, Lebanon. (left to right) Miss USA Julie Hayek, Cathy Lee Crosby, Bob Hope, Ann Jillian and Brooke Shields.

Hayek won the 1983 Miss California USA title. She represented California in the 1983 Miss USA pageant held in Knoxville, Tennessee, in May 1983, and became her state's fourth Miss USA titleholder. In her role, she met presidents, prime ministers and heads of state from around the world. Hayek joined forces with Bob Hope and the USO in support of the nation's servicemen and women. She was a celebrity guest and entertainer for Bob Hope's USO Christmas in Beirut TV special, shot in Beirut, Lebanon, aboard the Sixth Fleet's aircraft carrier.

== Miss Universe ==
Hayek went on to represent the United States at the 1983 Miss Universe pageant, held at Kiel Auditorium in St. Louis, Missouri. Her national costume was a cowgirl. She had the highest preliminary score and won both the swimsuit and evening gown competitions during the final competition. She became first runner-up to eventual winner Lorraine Downes of New Zealand.

== Life after Miss USA ==
As an actress, Hayek has appeared on the TV series Dallas, Twin Peaks, Moonlighting, Matlock, Hunter, Hardball and As the World Turns. She was a celebrity guest on The Tonight Show with Johnny Carson, and co-hosted the 1985 revival of Break the Bank. Her film credits include Commando, along with the made-for-TV movies Scandal in a Small Town and Seduction: Three Tales from the Inner Sanctum.

Hayek later moved to New York to become a model and stock trader. She has modeled or served as spokesperson for Kodak, Victoria's Secret, Christian Dior, Warnaco, Natori, Mary McFadden, Tissot, and Mattel. Hayek has been featured in Vogue, Cosmopolitan, Sports Illustrated (four times), Tattler, Health and Fitness, and Hamptons, and was on the cover of Manhattan magazine. At the Miss USA 2011 competition, she was among 31 former winners who were part of a photo shoot layout for Time.

== Filmography ==
Year	Title	Role
1981	The Fall Guy	Sally
1983	Murder Me, Murder You	Second French Courier
1984	Mike Hammer	Sandy
1985	Commando	Western Flight Attendant
1985	Hunter	Sheilla
1985-1986	Break The Bank	Hostess (herself)
1986	Moonlighting	Bridal Candidate
1986	The Return of Mickey Spillane's Mike Hammer	Ticket Cashier
1988	Scandal in a Small Town	Savannah
1989	Dallas	Tanya Wilkinson
1989	Hard Time on Planet Earth	Lana
1989	The Banker	Terry
1990	Hardball	
1991	Twin Peaks	Model
1992	Seduction: Three Tales from the 'Inner Sanctum	
1999	As the World Turns	Spring Lake Nurse

Awards and achievements
Preceded by (Guam) Patty Chong Kerkos	Miss Universe 1st runner up	Succeeded by (South Africa) Leticia Snyman
Preceded by Terri Utley	Miss USA; 1983	Succeeded by Mai Shanley
Preceded by Suzanne Dewames	Miss California USA; 1983	Succeeded by Theresa Ring
