= Miss Louisiana USA =

Beauty pageant competition

- Formation: 1952
- Type: Beauty pageant
- Headquarters: Atlanta
- Location: Georgia
- Members: Miss USA
- Official language: English
- Key people: Ariana Blaize; Nic Blaize
- Website: Official website

The Miss Louisiana USA competition is the pageant that selects the representative for the state of Louisiana in the Miss USA pageant.

Miss Louisiana USA is produced by A Blaize Productions since 2025, which also produces the Miss USA and Miss Teen USA state pageants for Alabama, North Carolina, and South Carolina. A Blaize Productions' headquarters is in Atlanta, Georgia.

Ella Clark of Baton Rouge was crowned Miss Louisiana USA 2026 on July 11, 2026, at Mississippi State University in Starkville. She will represent Louisiana at Miss USA 2026.

== History ==
Louisiana is one of only seven states to have three or more Miss USA winners (in 1958, 1961, and 1996).

Four Miss Louisiana USA titleholders previously held the Miss Louisiana Teen USA title, including Ali Landry, who became the third woman from Louisiana to be crowned Miss USA.

Jennifer Dupont, Miss Louisiana USA 2000, is one of only seven women who have competed in the Miss Teen USA, Miss USA and Miss America pageants.

Louisiana's future success at Miss USA would be evident in the state's first contestant, Jeanne Vaughn Thompson, Miss Louisiana USA 1952 and 1953. She is the only woman to ever compete twice in the history of Miss USA, and to outright win a Miss USA state title twice.

Thompson was also the only two-time state titleholder in Miss USA history, a record she held for 44 years until Shanna Lyn Searles became the second and only other double state titleholder. Searles won the Miss California USA title outright in 1996 after inheriting the state's 1992 title due to the original winner, Shannon Marketic, being crowned Miss USA 1992.

Thompson's overall pageant success includes winning the Miss Louisiana state title and competing at Miss America in 1951, winning the first two Miss Louisiana USA state titles and competing in the first and second Miss USA pageants, becoming the first-ever 1st runner-up in 1952 and a semi-finalist and Miss Congeniality (Amity) winner in 1953. Her two consecutive participations in Miss USA and subsequent final placements prompted organizers to create a rule allowing a person to compete for the title only once.

Miss Louisiana USA contestants accomplished another feat first, winning both the Miss Congeniality (Amity) and Miss Photogenic awards ever given to a Miss USA state delegate. Thompson was the winner of the Miss Congeniality award given to the first Miss USA state contestant in 1953.

The second Miss Congeniality award given also went to another contestant from Louisiana, Judy Fletcher in 1960. That year, during the era when both Miss USA and Miss Universe pageants were held at the same time, Fletcher tied with a Miss Universe contestant from Myanmar (known at the time as Burma) for the award.

Sharon Brown, who represented Louisiana in 1961, won the first Miss Photogenic award given to a Miss USA state delegate. She also won the Miss USA title, the first Miss Photogenic winner to obtain that feat.

Louisiana is one of only two states (California the other) to have won both the Miss USA title and the Miss Photogenic award in the same year on two separate occasions (Brown in 1961 and Landry in 1996).

== Gallery of titleholders ==
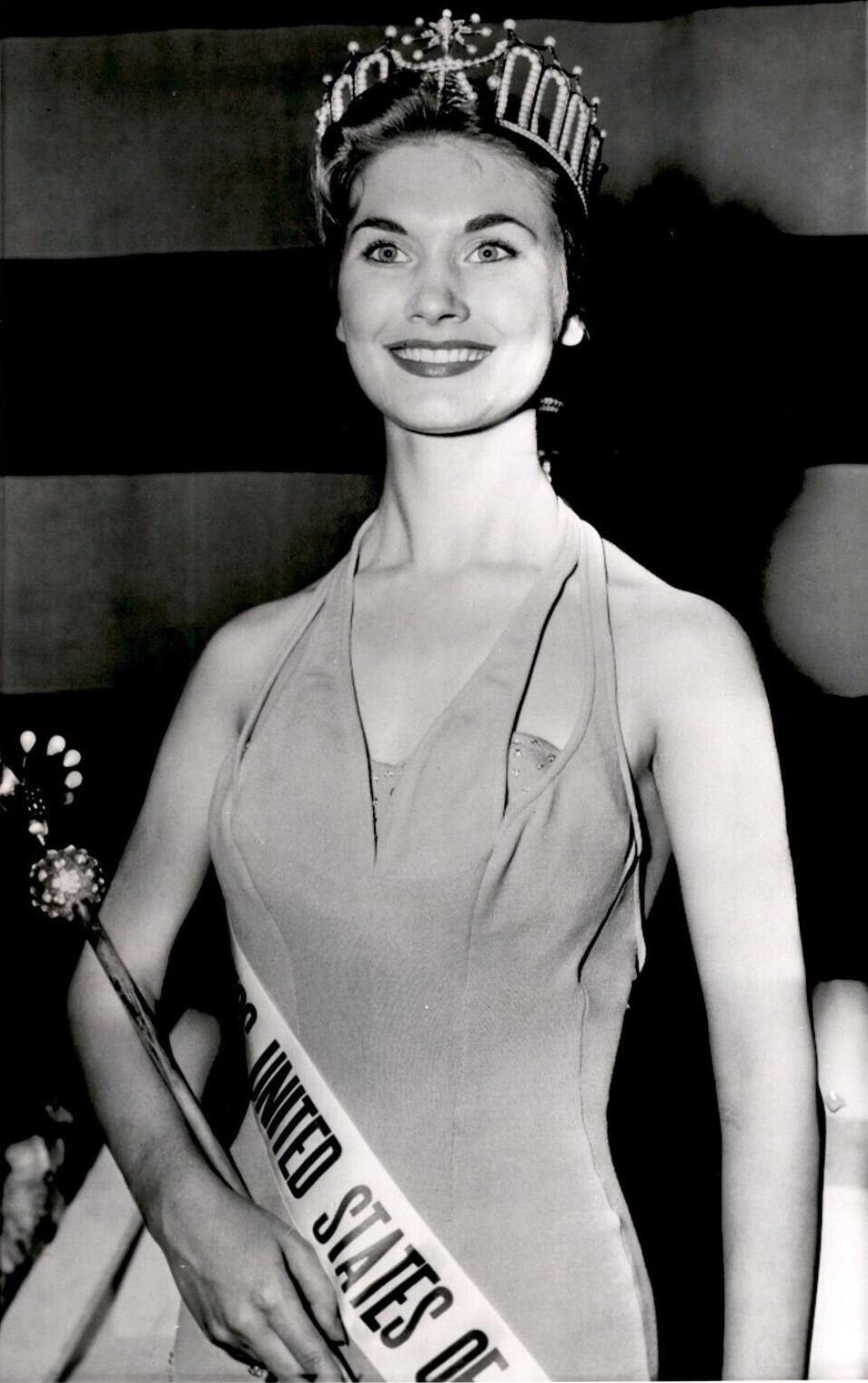
Eurlyne Howell, Miss Louisiana USA 1958 & Miss USA 1958

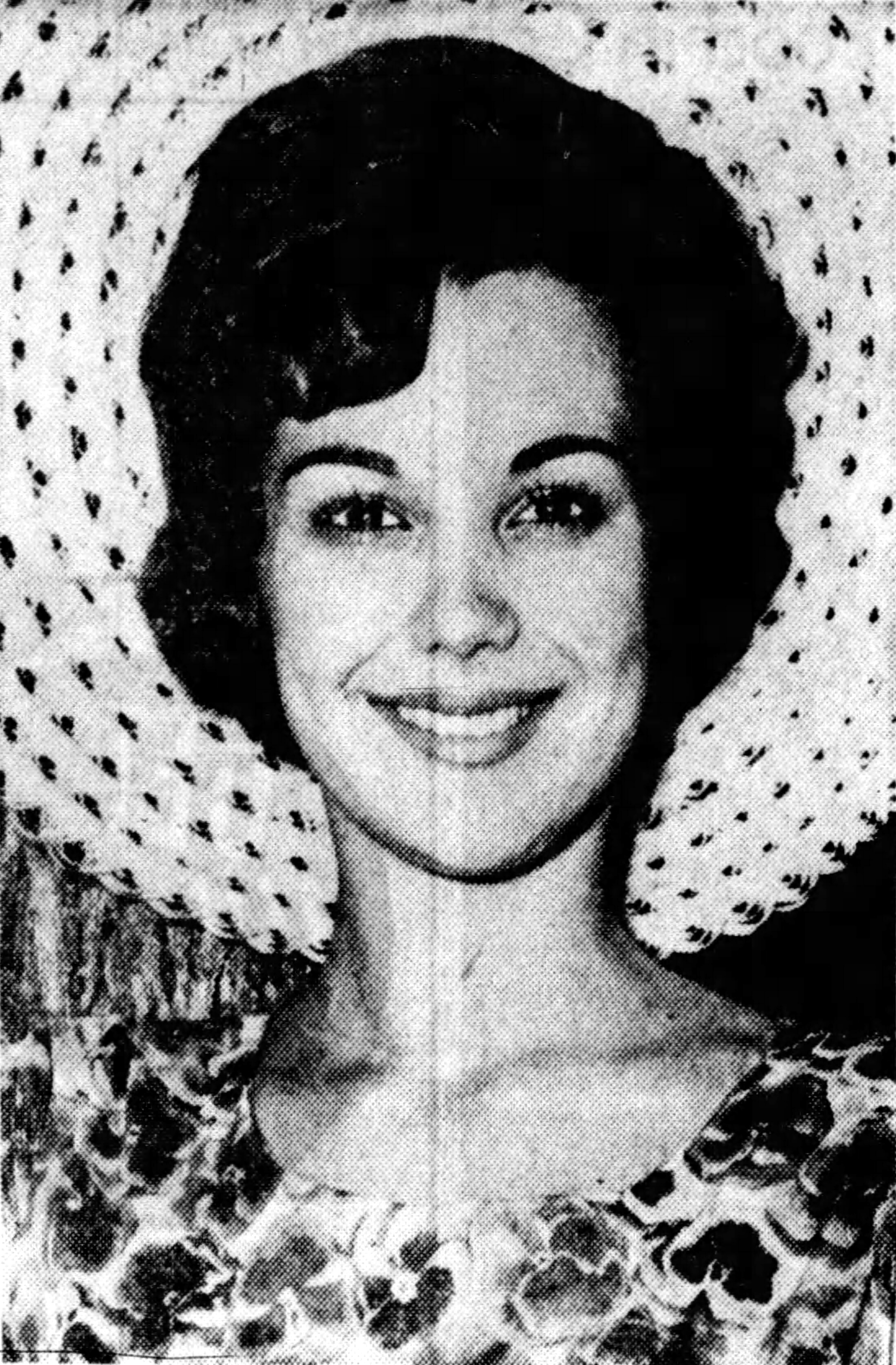
Sharon Brown, Miss Louisiana USA 1961 & Miss USA 1961

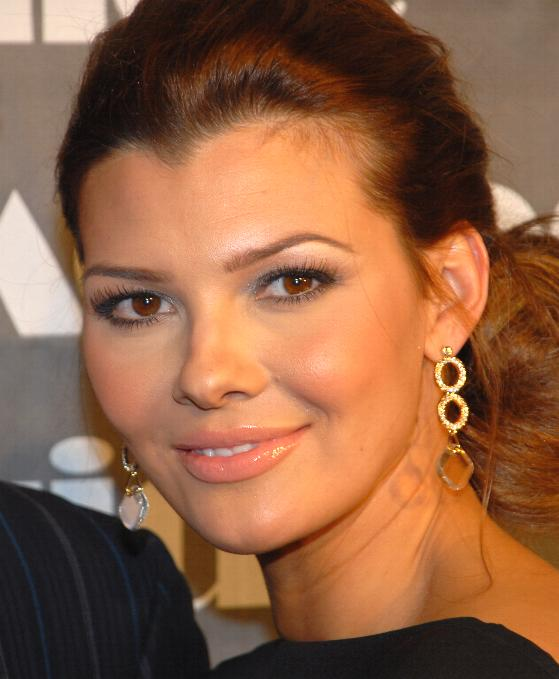
Ali Landry, Miss Louisiana USA 1996 & Miss USA 1996

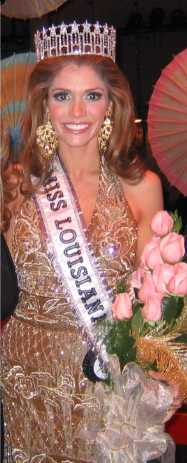
Elizabeth McNulty, Miss Louisiana USA 2007

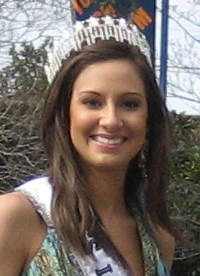
Michelle Berthelot, Miss Louisiana USA 2008

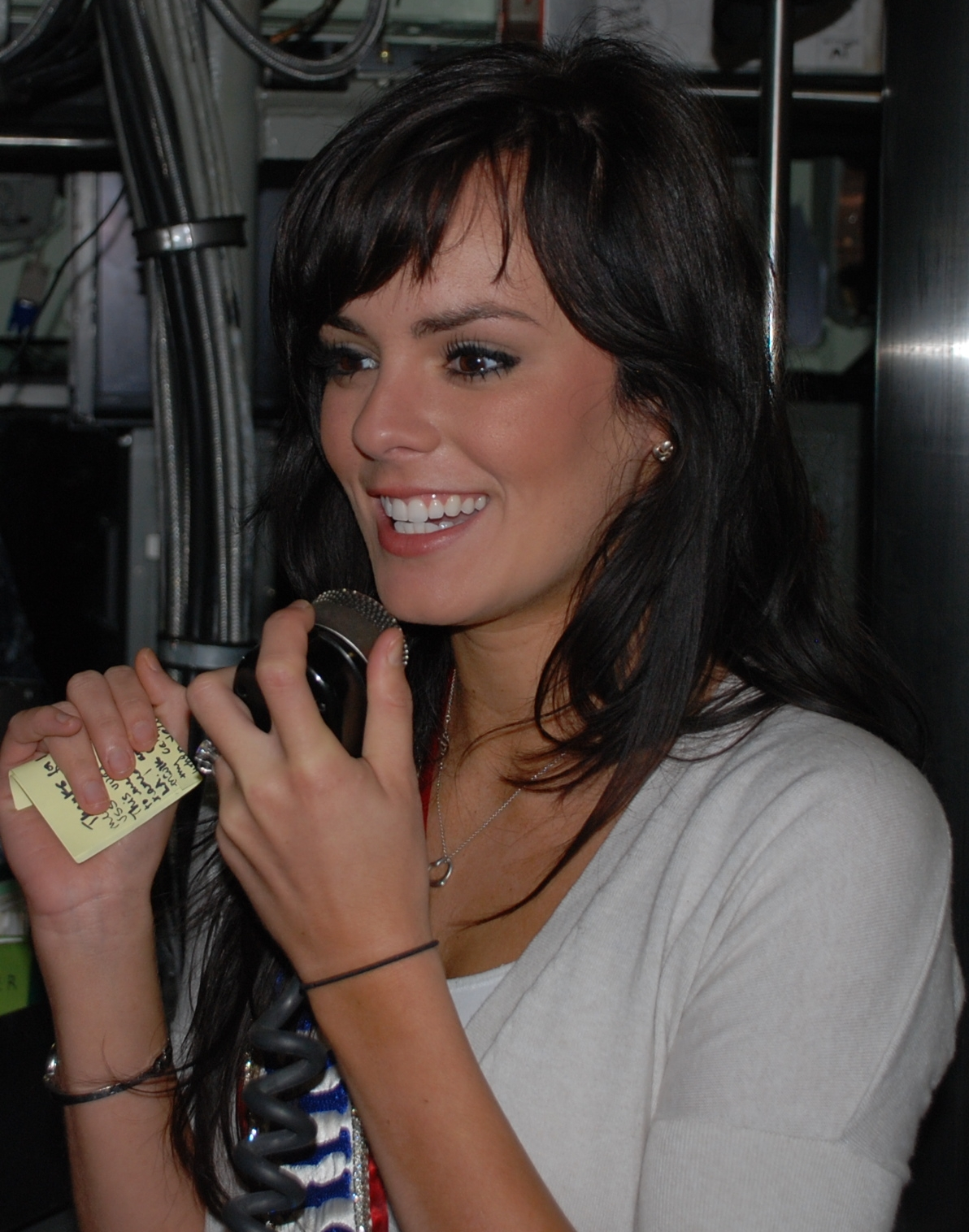
Sara Brooks, Miss Louisiana USA 2010

== Results summary ==
=== Placements ===
- Miss USAs: Eurlyne Howell (1958), Sharon Brown (1961), Ali Landry (1996)
- 1st runners-up: Jeanne Thompson (1952)
- 2nd runners-up: Lisa Moss (1981)
- 3rd runners-up: Kathy Hebert (1968), Pamela Forrest (1983), Sarie Joubert (1985), Elizabeth Primm (1989), Brittany Guidry (2014)
- 4th runners-up: Robyn Sanders (1976)
- Top 6: Shirelle Hebert (1994), Elizabeth Coxe (1995)
- Top 10/11/12: Bonnie Martin (1972), Storm Hensley (1973), Karen Hoff (1974), Christy Saylor (1992), Debbie Delhomme (1998), Anne Katherine Lene (2002), Kristen Girault (2013), Candice Bennatt (2015)
- Top 15/16/20: Jeanne Thompson (1953), Mary Lobianco (1959), Judy Fletcher (1960), Elizabeth McNulty (2007), Erin Edmiston (2012), Victoria Paul (2019), Mariah Clayton (2020), Tanya Crowe (2021), Francie Millan (2025), Ella Clark (2026)

Louisiana holds a record of 31 placements at Miss USA.

=== Awards ===
- Miss Photogenic: Sharon Brown (1961), Kathy Hebert (1968), Elizabeth Primm (1989), Ali Landry (1996)
- Miss Congeniality: Jeanne Thompson (1953), Judy Fletcher (1960)
- Best State Costume: 2nd Place: Elizabeth Primm (1989)
- People's Choice Award: Ella Clark (2026)

== Winners ==
Color key

- Declared as Winner
- Ended as runner-up or finalist
- Ended as one of the semifinalists

Year	Name	Hometown	Age^{1}	Local title	Placement at Miss USA	Special awards at Miss USA	Notes
2026	Ella Clark	Baton Rouge	24	Miss Baton Rouge	Top 20	People's Choice Award	
2025	Francie Millan	New Orleans	23	Miss New Orleans	Top 20		
2024	Sydney Taylor	Livingston	23	Miss Lafayette			Previously Miss Louisiana Teen USA 2020; 4th runner-Up at Miss Teen USA 2020
2023	Sylvia Kathryn Masters	Houma	27	Miss Sportsman's Paradise			
2022	Katelyn "KT" Scannell	Denham Springs	22	Miss Lafayette			
2021	Tanya Lea Crowe	Amite City	28	Miss New Orleans	Top 16		Professional cheerleader for the New Orleans Saintsations
2020	Mariah Michelle Clayton	Zachary	23	Miss Greater Baton Rouge	Top 16		
2019	Victoria Noel Paul	Alexandria	26	Miss Lafayette	Top 15		Later a contestant on season 24 of The Bachelor and season 7 of Bachelor in Paradise
2018	Lauren Michele Vizza	Shreveport	27	Miss Shreveport			Previously Miss Louisiana 2012; 3rd runner-up at Miss Louisiana 2010; 4th runner-up at Miss Louisiana 2011
2017	Bethany Michele Trahan	Lake Charles	21	Miss Calcasieu			
2016	Maaliyah Symone Papillion	Lake Charles	21	Miss Lake Charles			
2015	Candice Marie Bennatt	New Orleans	26	Miss Ville Platte	Top 11		Previously Miss New Mexico 2012; 1st runner-up at Miss Texas 2011; Former Houston Texans Cheerleader
2014	Brittany Alyson Guidry	Houma	21	Miss Florida Parishes	3rd Runner-up		Previously Miss Louisiana Teen USA 2009; 4th runner-up at Miss Teen USA 2009; One of few women to place in the top 5 at both Miss Teen USA and Miss USA; Cousin of Michelle Berthelot, Miss Louisiana USA 2008
2013	Kristen Brooke Girault	Metairie	21	Miss Florida Parish	Top 10		New Orleans Saints cheerleader
2012	Erin Rebecca Edmiston	Lafayette	22	Miss Camellia City	Top 16		
2011	Page Ellen Pennock	Shreveport	21				
2010	Sara Catherine Brooks	New Orleans	22				
2009	Katlin Lacey Minchew	Baton Rouge	24				Born in Marietta, Georgia; Previously Miss Teen America 2002 as Miss Georgia; 1st runner-up at Miss Louisiana USA 2006; 3rd runner-up at Miss Louisiana 2007
2008	Michelle Berthelot	Hammond	26				Cousin of Brittany Guidry, Miss Louisiana USA 2014
2007	Elizabeth Bienvenu McNulty	Lafayette	25		Top 15		2nd runner-up at Miss Louisiana USA 2006
2006	Christina Cuenca	Chalmette	26				
2005	Candice Dontrelle Stewart	Metairie	21				Previously Miss Louisiana Teen USA 2002; Contestant on Big Brother 15
2004	Melissa McConnell	Ruston	27				3rd runner-up at Miss Louisiana USA 2002
2003	Brittney Jayne Rogers	Shreveport	20				Winner of Fear Factor Miss USA episode; Later a contestant on The Amazing Race 8
2002	Anne Katherine Lene	Abbeville			Top 12		
2001	Heather Marie Hayden	Amite	22				
2000	Jennifer Dupont	Plaquemine					Previously Miss Louisiana Teen USA 1998; Later Miss Louisiana 2004; 1st runner up at Miss America 2005
1999	Melissa Bongiovanni	Baton Rouge	19				
1998	Debbie Delhomme	Lafayette	24	Top 10			3rd runner-up at Miss Hawaiian Tropic 1995; 3rd runner-up at Miss Louisiana USA 1997
1997	Nikole Elizabeth Viola	Walker	24				1st runner-up at Miss Louisiana USA 1996
1996	Ali Germaine Landry	Breaux Bridge	22		Miss USA 1996	Miss Photogenic	Previously Miss Louisiana Teen USA 1990; Top 12 at Miss Teen USA 1990; Top 6 finalist at Miss Universe 1996
1995	Elizabeth Mechelle Coxe	Springfield	24		Top 6		
1994	Shirelle Lea Hebert	Arabi	22		Top 6		
1993	Jennifer Mitchell	Leesville	21				
1992	Christy Lynn Saylor	Baton Rouge	23		Top 11		
1991	Melinda Murphy	West Monroe	22				
1990	Jeanne Rachel Burns	Baton Rouge	21				Currently evening news anchor for NBC affiliate WVLA in Baton Rouge
1989	Elizabeth Primm	Houma	23		3rd runner-up	Miss Photogenic; 2nd Place Best Costume	Participated at Miss Asia Pacific 1989; Later participated in the Spokesmodel category on Star Search in 1990
1988	Rhonda Leigh Vinson	Shreveport	22				Second runner-up at Miss Louisiana USA 1987
1987	Carol Carter	Shreveport	21				Previously Miss Louisiana 1985; 3rd runner-up at Miss Louisiana 1984
1986	Cecelia Brady	Olla	19				Daughter of Louisiana State Representative Thomas "Bud" Brady
1985	Sarie Nerine Joubert	Shreveport	22		3rd runner-up		1st runner-up at Miss International 1985
1984	Rusanne Jourdan	Baton Rouge	20				
1983	Pamela Jo Forrest	Baton Rouge	20		3rd runner-up		Mrs. America 1987; Mrs. World 1988
1982	Lisa Ann Michael	Baton Rouge	24				
1981	Lisa Lynn Moss	Shreveport	23		2nd runner-up		Top 5 finalist at Miss World 1981
1980	Kelly Bonin	Baton Rouge	19				
1979	Lisa Anderson	Gretna	19				
1978	Tauny Hanes	Baton Rouge					
1977	Patti Rosenbalm	Bossier City					
1976	Robyn Denise Sanders	Winnfield			4th Runner-up		
1975	Rhonda Hazel Shear	New Orleans					Television program host and actor, best known for her role as host of the USA Network's weekend movie show, USA Up All Night
1974	Karen Ann Hoff	Bossier City			Top 12		First runner-up at Miss Louisiana USA 1973
1973	Storm Carleyne Hensley	Bossier City	22	Miss Barksdale AFB	Top 12		Was a sergeant in the Air Force stationed at Barksdale Air Force Base in Bossier City: Third runner-up at Miss Louisiana USA 1972
1972	Bonnie Martin	Ashland	21		Top 12		
1971	Diana Risenstein	Bossier City					
1970	Nadine Ruth Robertson	Bossier City	20	Miss Bossier City			
1969	Patricia "Pat" Ann Dupre	Washington	18	Miss St. Landry Parish			
1968	Kathleen Annette "Kathy" Hebert	Franklin	19	Miss Lafayette	3rd runner-up	Miss Photogenic; Top 15 Best in Swimsuit	
1967	Dianne Mader	Houma	21				
1966	Tanya Becnel	Ama					
1965	Terri Marie Sommers	Shreveport	19				
1964	Linda Karen Graves	Shreveport					
1963	Margaret Susan "Peggy" Romero	Kaplan					
1962	Diane Gay DeClouet	Oak Ridge					Semifinalist in Miss World USA 1962
1961	Sharon Renee Brown	Minden			Miss USA 1961	Miss Photogenic	4th runner up at Miss Universe 1961
1960	Judy Rebecca Fletcher	Alexandria	18		Top 15	Miss Congeniality	
1959	Mary Margaret Lobianco					Top 15	
1958	Eurlyne "Arlene" Howell	Bossier City			Miss USA 1958		3rd runner up at Miss Universe 1958
1957	Earlyn Regouffre	New Orleans					
1956	Cecile Morris	Baton Rouge	19	Miss Baton Rouge			
1955	Merlin Grace Garcia	Gretna	19				
1954	Sadie Marie Vinson	New Orleans					Finalist in the 1955 Miss Dixie Pageant
1953	Jeanne Vaughn Thompson	Baton Rouge			Top 20	Miss Congeniality	Only woman ever to compete in Miss USA pageant twice.: Previously Miss Louisiana 1951.; Also competed in the 1952 Maid of Cotton Pageant
1952	Jeanne Vaughn Thompson	Baton Rouge	21		1st Runner-Up		Only woman ever to compete in Miss USA pageant twice.: Previously Miss Louisiana 1951.; Also competed in the 1952 Maid of Cotton Pageant

^{1} Age at the time of the Miss USA pageant
