= Kelly George (news anchor) =

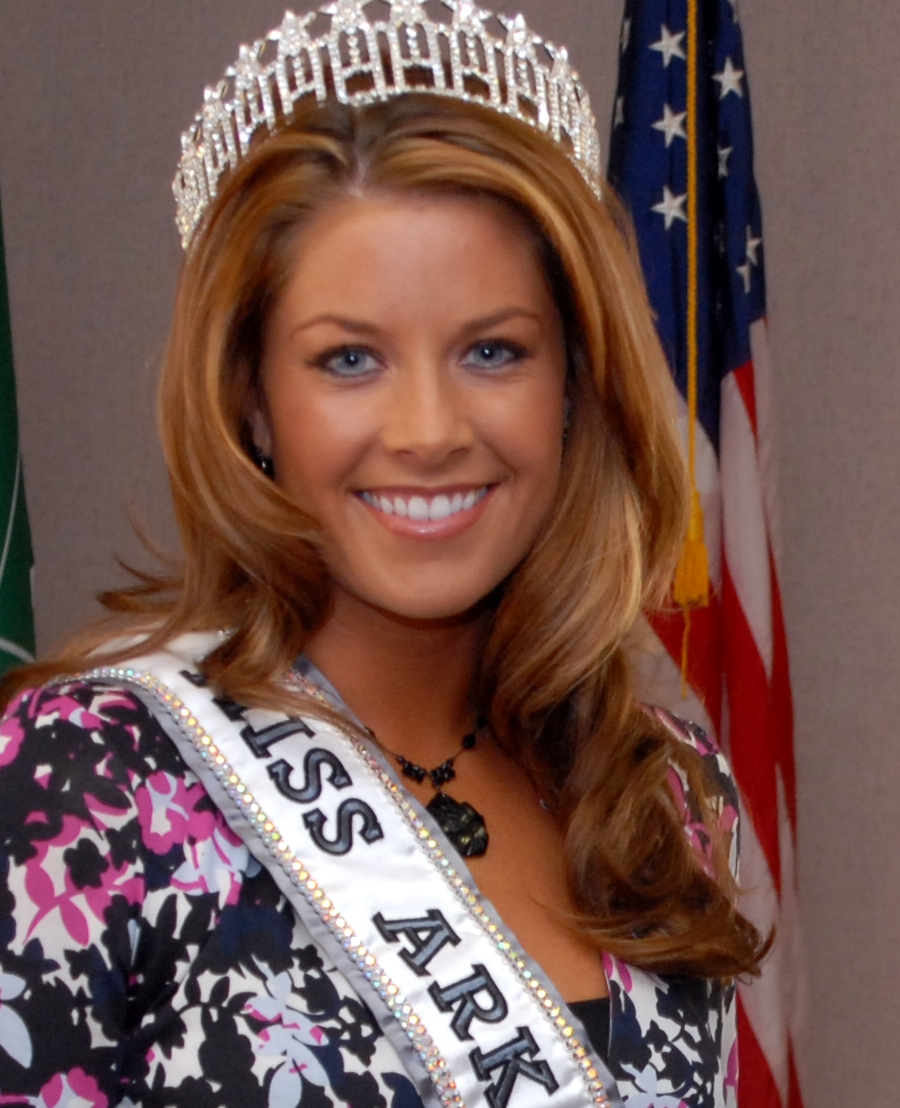
- Born: Kelly George; September 10, 1982 (age 44); Mission Viejo, California, U.S.
- Height: 5 ft 7 in (1.70 m)
- Spouse: Dominick Martimucci
- Beauty pageant titleholder
- Title: Miss Arkansas USA 2007
- Hair color: Brown
- Eye color: Blue
- Major competition: Miss USA 2007

Kelly Kaplan (née George; born September 10, 1982) is a social media, public relations and communication professional, and former officer in the United States Air Force, and a beauty queen from Mission Viejo, California, who competed for the Miss USA title in 2007.

== Biography ==
George grew up in Mission Viejo, California, and attended Trabuco Hills High School. She later gained a BA in communications from University of Maryland, College Park, in part paid for by the $25,000 she earned in scholarship money by competing in pageants. She had placed third runner-up at Miss Maryland 2004 pageant and second runner-up in 2005. While at the University of Maryland she joined the university's Air Force Reserve Officer Training Corps programme. She was later commissioned as a second lieutenant.

She then moved to Arkansas where she studied for her master's degree at University of Arkansas, Little Rock. She has worked as an intern at the press desk of the Office of the Secretary of Defense at The Pentagon and as deputy chief of Public Affairs for the 314th Airlift Wing at Little Rock Air Force Base.

While stationed in Arkansas she won the Miss Arkansas USA 2007 title in the state pageant held in Conway, Arkansas. A resident of Sherwood, she was presented with the key to the city.

George competed in the Miss USA 2007 pageant, which was broadcast live from the Kodak Theatre in Los Angeles, California, on March 23, 2007. She was the first active-duty military member to compete in the pageant in its 56-year history.

George is a former morning/noon news anchor for KNWA in Fayetteville, Arkansas. She also was featured on "Arkansas at Noon" a combination newscast on KARK where both Little Rock and Fayetteville participate. KNWA and KARK are sister NBC affiliate stations. She then moved to Houston where she worked for the Houston Astros as Director of Social Media and currently works as a spokeswoman for Boeing.

Honorary titles
Preceded by Kimberly Forsyth	Miss Arkansas USA; 2007	Succeeded by Rachel Howells
