= Miss New Mexico Teen USA =

Beauty pageant competition

- Formation: 1983
- Type: Beauty pageant
- Headquarters: El Paso
- Location: Texas
- Members: Miss Teen USA
- Official language: English
- Website: Official website

The Miss New Mexico Teen USA competition is a pageant that selects the representative for the state of New Mexico in the broader Miss Teen USA pageant. It is directed by Laura's Productions based in El Paso, Texas.

New Mexico has seen six state teens place in the Miss Teen USA pageant with three of these placements occurring during the 1980s, which and made New Mexico one of the more successful states in that decade. Not a single New Mexico teen had placed from 1988 until Brittany Toll made the finals in 2005.

Five New Mexico teens have triumphed at the Miss New Mexico USA and compete at Miss USA. More unusually, two have also competed at Miss America. In 2003, former New Mexico teens held both the Miss New Mexico USA and Miss New Mexico (America) titles.

Olivia Biggs of White Sands was crowned Miss New Mexico Teen USA 2026 on July 18, 2026 at the NMSU Center for the Arts in Las Cruces, New Mexico. She will represent New Mexico at Miss Teen USA 2026.

== Results summary ==
=== Placements ===
- Top 10: Cheryl Douds (1984), Carolee Hanson (1986), Jill Vasquez (1988), Brittany Toll (2005)
- Top 15/16/20: Liz Kranz (2007), Jacqueline Cai (2012), Ava Kincaid (2025), Olivia Biggs (2026)

New Mexico holds a record of 8 placements at Miss Teen USA.

=== Awards ===
- Best State Costume: Emily Lehr (2021; 2nd place)

== Winners ==
- Declared as Winner
- Ended as runner-up
- Ended as one of the finalists or semifinalists

Year	Name	Hometown	Age^{1}	Local title	Placement at Miss Teen USA	Special awards at Miss Teen USA	Notes
2026	Olivia Biggs	White Sands	19	Miss White Sands Teen	Top 20		
2025	Ava Kincaid	Las Cruces	19	Miss Las Cruces Teen	Top 20		
2024	Fernanda Gonzalez	Albuquerque	19	Miss Land of Enchantment Teen			
2023	Asia Rose Simpson	Hobbs	15	Miss Hobbs Teen		Miss Congeniality	Later Miss World Philippines 2026; Top 12 at Miss World 2026
2022	Caroline Babcock	Farmington	17	Miss Farmington Teen			
2021	Emily Lehr	Alamogordo	16	Miss Alamogordo Teen		Best State Costume – 2nd Place	Later Miss New Mexico's Teen 2023
2020	Isabella Bizzell	Albuquerque	17	Miss Land of Enchantment Teen			
2019	Angela Nañez	Clovis	14	Miss Clovis Teen			
2018	Madison Turner	Mosquero	18	Miss Santa Fe Teen			
2017	Kalina Hamilton	Albuquerque	16	Miss Albuquerque Teen			
2016	Margeaux Greene	Sandia Park	16	Miss Sandia Park Teen			
2015	Nicolette Pacheco	Rio Rancho	18	Miss Taos Teen			
2014	Aundria Littlejohn	Las Cruces	17	Miss Dona Ana County Teen			
2013	Addi Smith	Las Cruces	17				
2012	Jacqueline Cai	Las Cruces	17		Top 16		
2011	Alexa Castle	Albuquerque	18				
2010	Faith Anneliese Cortez	Las Cruces	18				
2009	Alexis Duprey	Alamogordo	18	Miss Southern NM Teen			Triple crown winner: Miss New Mexico USA 2015; Miss New Mexico 2013; Non-Finalist Interview Award at Miss America, 1st runner up Miss New Mexico Outstanding Teen 2008
2008	Victoria Padilla	Santa Fe	18				
2007	Liz Kranz	Deming	19	Miss Deming Teen	Top 15		
2006	Raquel Padilla	Santa Fe	18	Miss Santa Fe Teen			
2005	Brittany Toll	Las Cruces	18		Top 10		Later Miss New Mexico USA 2011; Top 16 at Miss USA 2011
2004	Jocelyn Cruz	Las Cruces	17				
2003	Courtney Clayshulte	Las Cruces	18				
2002	Amber Evaro	Las Cruces	17				
2001	Alaina Castillo	Las Cruces	18	Miss White Sands Teen			
2000	Raelene Aguilar	Sunland Park	18				Sister of Rosanne Aguilar, Miss New Mexico USA 2010.: Later Miss New Mexico USA 2008.
1999	Alina Ogle	Albuquerque	17				Later Miss New Mexico USA 2003; Top 10 at Miss USA 2003
1998	Rana Jones	Tatum	17				Later Miss New Mexico 2003; 1st runner-up to Miss New Mexico USA 2007
1997	Vicki Hughes	Las Cruces	19				
1996	Whitni Zimmerman	Lovington	17				
1995	Shelby Phillips	Deming	18				
1994	Samantha Sengel	Albuquerque	18				
1993	Lynette Ochoa	Deming	19				
1992	Hillary Matkin	Deming	17				Later hosted the KVIA-TV program Good Morning El Paso
1991	Kimberly Apodaca	Albuquerque	18				
1990	Beth Baskin	Albuquerque	18				
1989	Shana Wilmont	Albuquerque	18				
1988	Jill Vasquez	Albuquerque	18		Top 10		Later Miss New Mexico USA 1994; Former co-director of the Miss California USA and Miss California Teen USA pageants under her married name, Jill Vasquez-Foley. Former line captain of the NFL Arizona Cardinals Cheerleaders.
1987	Samantha Owen	Albuquerque	17				
1986	Carolee Hanson	Las Cruces	18		Top 10		
1985	Teresa Rodriguiz	Clovis	16				Later Miss New Mexico 1988
1984	Cheryl Douds	Las Cruces	17		Top 10		
1983	Eloisa Serna	Albuquerque	17				

^{1} Age at the time of the Miss Teen USA pageant
