= Miss New Mexico =

Beauty pageant competition

- Formation: 1925
- Type: Beauty pageant
- Headquarters: Albuquerque
- Location: New Mexico
- Members: Miss America
- Official language: English
- Website: Miss New Mexico official website

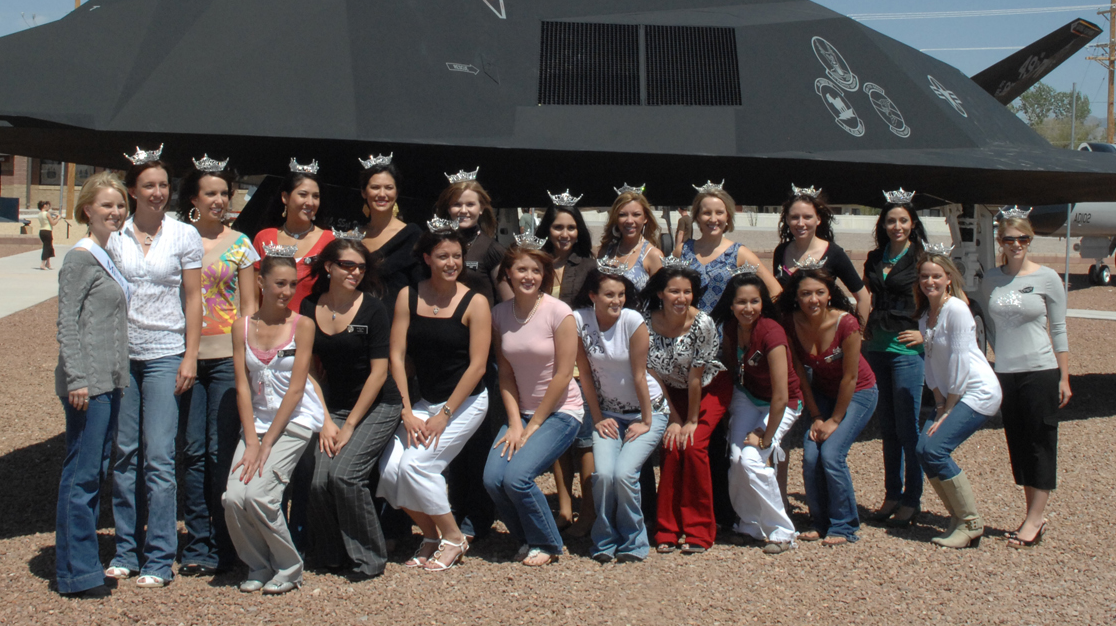
Miss New Mexico 2008 contestants, with Miss New Mexico 2007 Jenny Marlow (left)

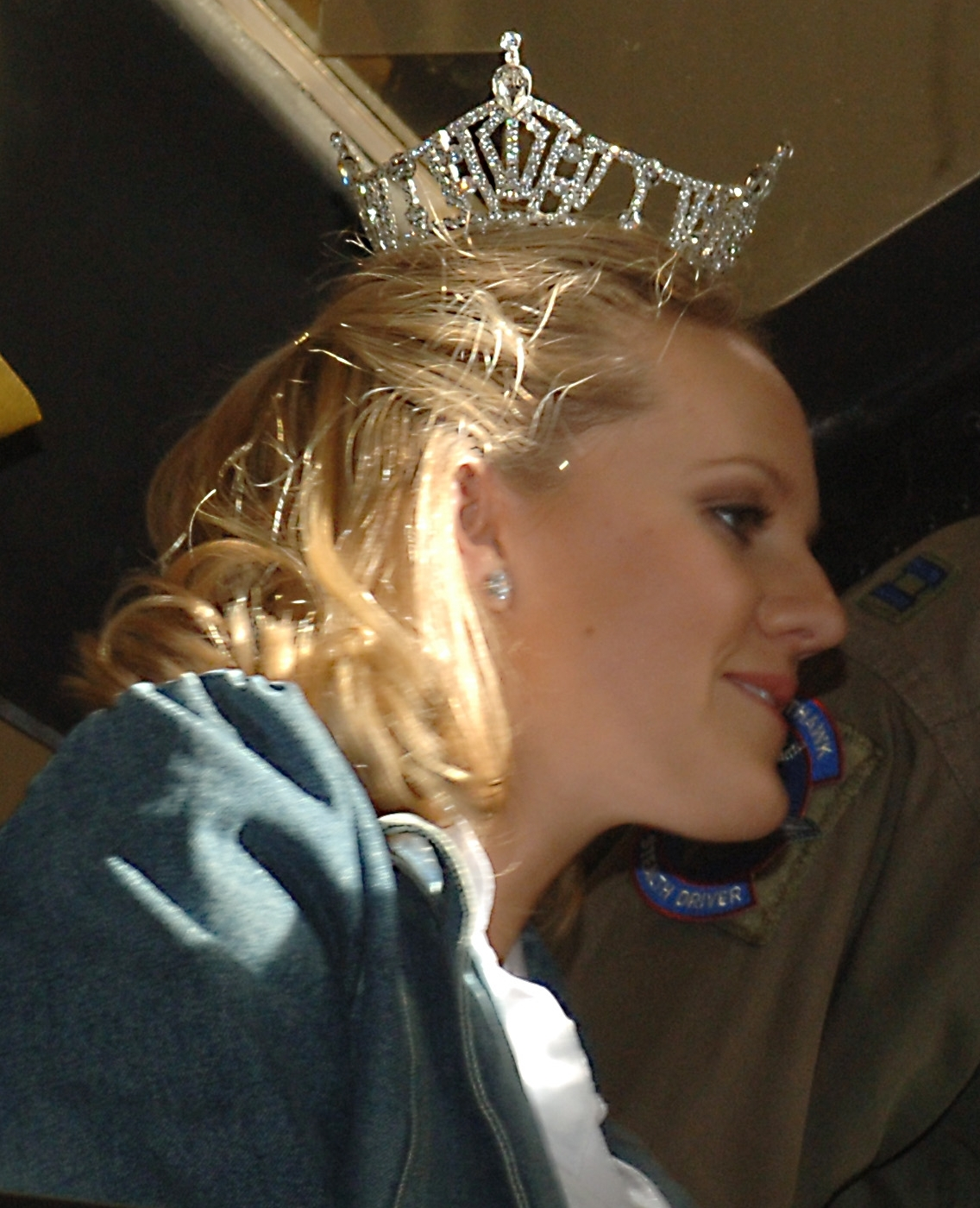
Christina Hall, Miss New Mexico 2006

The Miss New Mexico competition is the pageant that selects the representative for the state of New Mexico in the Miss America pageant.

Katarina Blakeslee of Albuquerque was crowned Miss New Mexico 2026 on June 13, 2026, at the Flickinger Center in Alamogordo. She competed for the title of Miss America 2027 on September 6, 2026, at the Kravis Center for the Performing Arts in West Palm Beach, Florida.

== Results summary ==
The following is a visual summary of the past results of Miss New Mexico titleholders at the national Miss America pageants/competitions. The year in parentheses indicates the year of the national competition during which a placement and/or award was garnered, not the year attached to the contestant's state title.

=== Placements ===
- Top 7: Nicole Miner (2010)
- Top 10: Myrtice Conn (1962), Jane Nelson (1965), Sharon Kaye Birkenbuel (1967), Pat Brummett (1970), Donna Frances Reel (1975), Valerie Faber (1986)
- Top 15: Taylor Rey (2018)

=== Awards ===
==== Preliminary awards ====
- Preliminary Lifestyle and Fitness: Jane Nelson (1965)
- Preliminary Talent: Pat Brummett (1970)

==== Non-finalist awards ====
- Non-finalist Interview: Susan Yara (2005), Alexis Duprey (2014), Marissa Livingston (2016)
- Non-finalist Talent: Shirley Hughes (1949), Rosemary Brown (1968)

==== Other awards ====
- Miss Congeniality: Glynnelle Hubbard (1958), Karen Jan Maciolek (1969)
- Charles and Theresa Brown Scholarship: Nicole Miner (2010)
- STEM Scholarship Award Winners: Jessica Burson (2015)

== Winners ==
- Declared as winner
- Ended as a runner-up
- Ended as a finalist or semi-finalist

Year	Name	Hometown	Age	Local Title	Miss America Talent	Placement at Miss America	Special scholarships at Miss America	Notes
2026	Katarina Blakeslee	Albuquerque	26	Miss Alburquerque	Vocal & Guitar			
2025	Madyson Kettler	Corrales	20	Miss Corrales	Dance			
2024	Emille-Marie Enriquez	Alamogordo	24	Miss Otero County	Folkloric Dance, "El Son De La Negra"			Previously Miss New Mexico Volunteer 2022
2023	Lianna Hartshorn	Las Cruces	19	Miss Las Cruces	Vocal, "Never Enough" from The Greatest Showman			
2022	Kaitlin Kerl	Albuquerque	25	Miss Albuquerque	Dance			Previously New Mexico Sweetheart 2019
2021	Sienna Rose Mascarenas	Albuquerque	20	Miss Zia	Jazz Dance, "In the Air Tonight"			Previously Miss New Mexico's Outstanding Teen 2017; Later Miss New Mexico Volunteer 2025 Non Finalist Award Winner
2019–20 (Note: Titleholder extended to a second full year in 2020 after state and national pageants postponed to 2021 due to the COVID-19 pandemic)	Misa L. Tran	Alamogordo	20	Miss Otero County	Dance			Previously Distinguished Young Woman of New Mexico 2017
2018	Ashley Fresquez	Rio Rancho	23	Miss Zia	Jazz Dance, "Man of La Mancha"			Previously Miss New Mexico's Outstanding Teen 2009
2017	Taylor Rey	Las Cruces	22	Miss Las Cruces	Vocal, "Art Is Calling for Me"	Top 15		
2016	Stephanie Chavez	Albuquerque	23	Miss Albuquerque	Vocal, "That's Life" by Frank Sinatra			Contestant at National Sweetheart 2015 pageant
2015	Marissa Livingston	Albuquerque	24	Miss Duke City	Jazz Dance, "Let's Get Loud"		Non-finalist Interview Award	Contestant at National Sweetheart 2014 pageant
2014	Jessica Burson	Roswell	20	Miss Roswell	Jazz Dance, "Steam Heat"		STEM Scholarship Award	
2013	Alexis Duprey	Alamogordo	22	Miss Otero County	Vocal, "Maybe This Time" from Cabaret		Duprey Non-finalist Interview Award	Alexis Victoria Duprey is a Triple Crown Winner: Previously Miss New Mexico Teen USA 2009; Later Miss New Mexico USA 2015
2012	Candice Bennatt	Angel Fire	23	Miss Rudioso	Lyrical Dance, "Aqua Vitae"			Former Houston Texans cheerleader Later Miss Louisiana USA 2015; Top 11 at Miss USA 2015 pageant
2011	Sarina Kay Turnbull	Alamogordo	24	Miss Alamogordo	Ballet en Pointe, "The Prayer"			Contestant at National Sweetheart 2009 pageant
2010	Madison Leigh Tabet	Albuquerque	18	Miss Bernalillo County	Jazz Dance, "I'm Gonna Live Till I Die"			Previously Miss New Mexico's Outstanding Teen 2007
2009	Nicole Andrea Miner	Albuquerque	23	Miss Southern New Mexico	Vocal, "Somewhere"	Top 7	Charles and Theresa Brown Scholarship	Contestant at National Sweetheart 2008 pageant
2008	Christina Olmi	Albuquerque	24	Miss Albuquerque	Vocal			Christina Suzanne Olmi working on an entertainment career.
2007	Jennifer (Jenny) Lindsey Marlowe	Albuquerque	23	Miss High Plains	Vocal, "Born For This"			
2006	Christina Marie Hall	Albuquerque	23	Miss Albuquerque	Vocal, "Summertime"			Contestant at National Sweetheart 2005 pageant
2005	Ane Cristal Romero	Las Vegas	25	Miss Las Vegas	Vocal, "A Broken Wing"			
2004	Susan Linda Yara	Pecos	23	Miss San Miguel County	Vocal, "La Charreada"		Non-finalist Interview Award	
2003	Rana Beth Jones	Tatum	22	Miss South Plains	Vocal, "Can't Help Falling in Love"			Previously Miss New Mexico Teen USA 1998
2002	Jennifer Erin Griggs	Alamogordo	22	Miss Alamogordo/Otero County	Violin			Contestant at National Sweetheart 2000 pageant
2001	Marta Strzyzewski	Roswell	23	Miss Roswell	Classical Piano, "Revolutionary Etude"			
2000	Martha Michelle Cobb	Roswell	21	Miss Las Cruces	Tap Dance, "Steam Heat"			
1999	Katie Linda Amalia Kelly	Santa Fe	19	Miss Santa Fe	Vocal, "Hurt Me"			
1998	Lindsay Dawn Chism	Hobbs	21	Miss Lea County	Jazz Dance, "You're the One That I Want"			
1997	Jennifer Leigh Babin	Alamogordo	22	Miss Otero County	Piano			
1996	Trisha Williams	Hobbs	19	Miss Lea County	Vocal, "He's Always There"			
1995	Vivian Yun Herding	Albuquerque	24	Miss Zia	Classical Piano			
1994	Felicia Anna Borrego	Tijeras	23	Miss Bernalillo County	Ballet Folklorico			
1993	Sharron N. Melton	Portales	24	Miss Portales	Vocal, "Stuff Like That There"			A native of Texas and first black woman to be named Miss New Mexico. Currently a television journalist in Houston, Texas.
1992	Shireen Ilsa Cheney	Albuquerque	23	Miss Portales	Acro-Funk Dance			
1991	Rebecca (Bekki) Renee Shipley	Tucumcari	20	Miss Tucumcari	Flute & Piccolo			
1990	Jana Elaine McCoy	Portales	22	Miss Portales	Vocal, "The Gypsy in My Soul"			A native of Texas.
1989	Angela De Los Santos	Hobbs	23	Miss Portales	Popular Vocal, "The Wind Beneath My Wings"			
1988	Teresa Rodriquez	Clovis	21	Miss Portales	Popular Vocal, "Anything for You"			Previously Miss New Mexico Teen USA 1985
1987	Becky Birdwell	Hobbs	25	Miss Tucumcari	Ballet			A native of Texas.
1986	Emily Kay Franklin	Albuquerque	19	Miss Albuquerque	Vocal Medley			
1985	Valerie Joy Faber	Hobbs	26	Miss Albuquerque	Classical Piano, "Polonaise in A-flat major, Op. 53"	Top 10		A native of Virginia.
1984	Trina Lynn Collins	Hobbs	22	Miss Albuquerque	Acrobatic Dance			Mother of Miss Indiana 2015, Morgan Jackson
1983	Mai Shanley	Alamogordo	20	Miss Otero County	Vocal, "I Feel Pretty" from West Side Story			Later Miss New Mexico USA & Miss USA 1984; Top 10 at Miss Universe 1984 pageant
1982	Cindy Ann Friesen	Carlsbad	19	Miss Carlsbad	Vocal, "Carnival"			
1981	Lynn Lawson	Portales	21	Miss Portales	Classical Piano, "Piano Concerto No. 2, Third Movement" by Rachmaninoff			
1980	Teresa Elizabeth Anderson	Hobbs	22	Miss Hobbs	Vocal, "As Long As He Needs Me"			
1979	Susan Spartz	Alamogordo	18	Miss Otero County	Vocal, "My Man"			
1978	Jennifer Leigh Schubert	Hobbs	21	Miss Hobbs	Classical Ballet, "Beethoven's 7th Symphony"			
1977	Evelyn Ann Foster	Lovington	20	Miss Lovington	Vocal, "Feeling Good"			
1976	Melody Griffin	Hobbs	21	Miss Hobbs	Vocal, "The Music and the Mirror" from A Chorus Line			
1975	Sarah Jan Schooley	Jal	21	Miss Eastern New Mexico University	Piano, "Deep Purple"			
1974	Donna Frances Reel	Albuquerque	21	Miss Albuquerque	Vocal, "For Once in My Life"	Top 10		Previously Miss New Mexico USA 1972; Top 10 at Miss USA 1972 pageant Previously Miss New Mexico World 1973; Top 16 at Miss World USA 1973 pageant
1973	Patti Elaine Nelms	Roswell	21	Miss Roswell	Vocal / Dance, "Basin Street Blues" & "Rock-a-Bye Your Baby with a Dixie Melody"			
1972	Wren Prather	Carlsbad	19	Miss Carlsbad	Upside Down Tap Dance, "Yankee Doodle Dandy"			
1971	Michele Cornali	Silver City	22	Miss Grant County	Semi-classical Vocal, "Love Is Where You Find It"			
1970	Janis Lynn Jones	Raton	21	Miss Colfax County	Soft-shoe Dance, "Golden Slippers"			
1969	Patricia (Pat) Jo Brummett	Hobbs	21	Miss Hobbs	Classical Vocal, "Caro Nome" from Rigoletto	Top 10	Preliminary Talent Award	
1968	Karen Jan Maciolek	Albuquerque	19	Miss Portales	Waltz Ballet, "Wunderbar"		Miss Congeniality	
1967	Rosemary Elizabeth Brown	Carlsbad	20	Miss Portales	Vocal, "This Is My Song"		Non-finalist Talent Award	
1966	Sharon Kaye Birkenbuel	Albuquerque	20	Miss Albuquerque	Dramatic Skit	Top 10		
1965	Ellen Growden	University Park	21	Miss La Mesilla	Dramatic Sketch, "Relationship of a Mother and Daughter"			
1964	Jane Nelson	Tularosa	19	Miss Tularosa	Original Vocal with Guitar & Tympani, "Theme from Exodus"	Top 10	Preliminary Swimsuit Award	Later Miss Arizona USA 1965; 1st runner-up at Miss USA 1965 pageant Later Miss New Mexico World 1966; Top 7 at Miss USA World 1966 pageant
1963	Sandi Joyce Moore	Loving	19	Miss Carlsbad	Combination acrobatic routine & drawing			
1962	Herma Loy Elliot	Portales	20	Miss Portales	Classical Vocal, "Un Bel Di" from Madama Butterfly			
1961	Myrtice Lee Conn	Clovis	21	Miss Clovis	Comedic Monologue, "Phonetic Punctuation" by Victor Borge	Top 10		
1960	Carolyn Adams Moore	Carlsbad	18	Miss Carlsbad	Caricature Drawing			
1959	Linda Frances Moore	Ruidoso	19	Miss Albuquerque	Piano			
1958	Lois Fay Wilson	Hobbs	18	Miss Hobbs	Vocal			
1957	Glynnelle Hubbard	Farmington	19	Miss Farmington	Dance		Miss Congeniality	
1956	No New Mexico representative at Miss America pageant							
1955	No New Mexico representative at Miss America pageant							
1954	No New Mexico representative at Miss America pageant							
1953	No New Mexico representative at Miss America pageant							
1952	No New Mexico representative at Miss America pageant							
1951	No New Mexico representative at Miss America pageant							
1950	Martha Rose Wilson	Santa Fe	22					
1949	Shirley Hughes	Carlsbad	18	Miss Carlsbad	Charcoal & Chalk Drawing, "Cruising Down the River"		Non-finalist Talent Award	
1948	Sarah Betha Young	Cuba	22		Art Sculpture			
1947	No New Mexico representative at Miss America pageant							
1946	Martha Bernice Cooper	Albuquerque			Speech, "Career As a Newspaper Reporter"			
1945	No New Mexico representative at Miss America pageant							
1944	No New Mexico representative at Miss America pageant							
1943	No New Mexico representative at Miss America pageant							
1942	Marjorie Rose Adams	Roswell						
1941	Beverly Nell Brookshier	Roswell						
1940	No New Mexico representative at Miss America pageant							
1939	No New Mexico representative at Miss America pageant							
1938	No New Mexico representative at Miss America pageant							
1937	No New Mexico representative at Miss America pageant							
1936	No New Mexico representative at Miss America pageant							
1935	No New Mexico representative at Miss America pageant							
1934	No national pageant was held							
1933	Julia Valdez		18	Miss Albuquerque				No Miss New Mexico Competed under local title at Miss America pageant
1932	No national pageants were held							
1931	No national pageants were held							
1930	No national pageants were held							
1929	No national pageants were held							
1928	No national pageants were held							
1927	No New Mexico representative at Miss America pageant							
1926	No New Mexico representative at Miss America pageant							
1925	Celina Chauvin			Miss Albuquerque				No Miss New Mexico Competed under local title at Miss America pageant
1924	No New Mexico representative at Miss America pageant							
1923	No New Mexico representative at Miss America pageant							
1922	No New Mexico representative at Miss America pageant							
1921	No New Mexico representative at Miss America pageant							
