= Miss New Mexico USA =

Beauty pageant competition

- Formation: 1952
- Type: Beauty pageant
- Headquarters: El Paso
- Location: Texas
- Members: Miss USA
- Official language: English
- Website: Official website

The Miss New Mexico USA competition is the pageant that selects the representative for the state of New Mexico in the Miss USA pageant. It is directed by Laura's Productions based in El Paso, Texas.

New Mexico achieved many placements in the 1960s to the '80s and produced one Miss USA, Mai Shanley in 1984. The most recent placement was Bianca Wright in 2023, placing in the Top 20.

Cara Rgnonti of Rio Rancho was crowned as Miss New Mexico USA 2026 on July 18, 2026 at the NMSU Center for the Arts in Las Cruces. She will represent New Mexico at Miss USA 2026.

== Gallery of titleholders ==
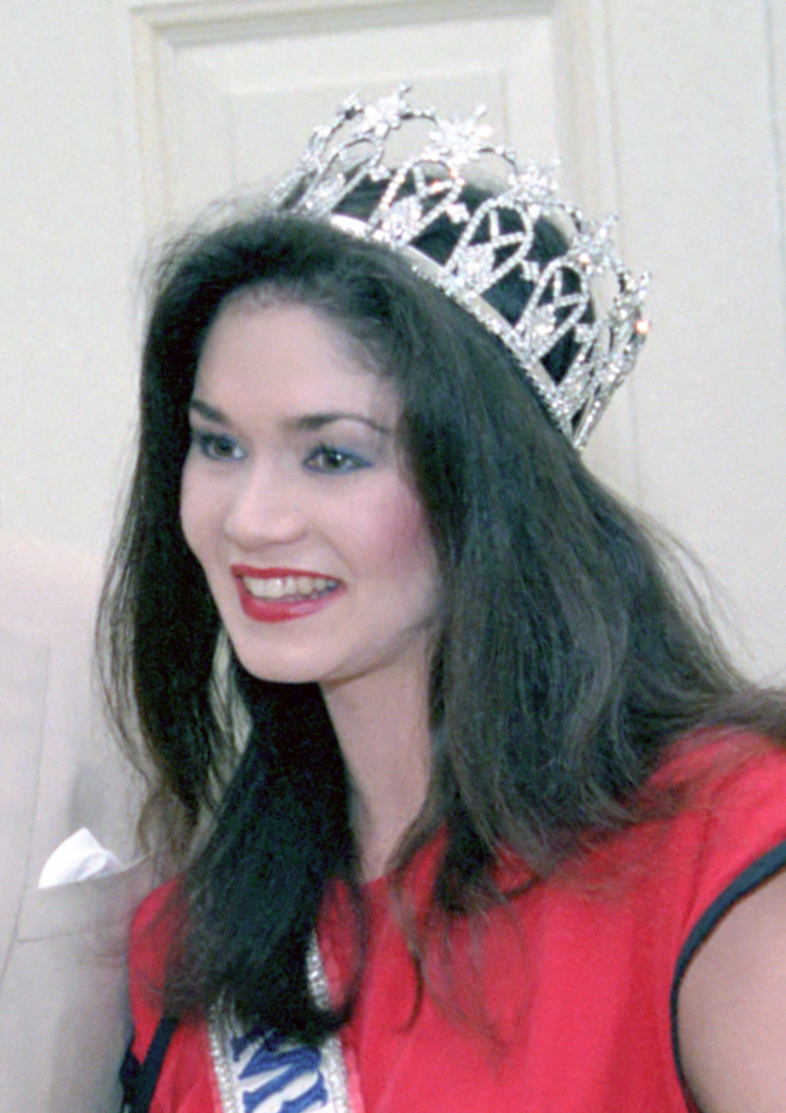
Mai Shanley, Miss New Mexico & Miss USA 1984

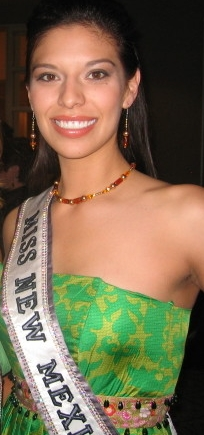
Onawa Lacy, Miss New Mexico USA 2006

== Results summary ==
- Miss USA: Mai Shanley (1984)
- 1st runners-up: Brenda Denton (1985), Alejandra Gonzalez (2019)
- 2nd runner-up: Judith Baldwin (1965)
- 4th runners-up: Bonnie Tafoya (1968), Marlena Garland (1978)
- Top 5: Michelle Rios (1999)
- Top 10/11/12: Donna Reel (1972), Jonelle Bergquist (1976), Denise Funderburk (1977), Kathy Patrick (1980), Kriston "Kiki" Killgore (1987), Alina Ogle (2003), Suzanne Perez (2022)
- Top 15/16/20: Joan Schwartz (1955), Sandra "Sandi" Fullingim (1963), Mary Gard (1969), Jenna Hardin (2004), Brittany Toll (2011), Bianca Wright (2023), Cara Rgnonti (2026)
- New Mexico holds a record of 21 placements at Miss USA.

=== Awards ===
- Miss Photogenic: Michele Sandoval (1979)
- Best State Costume: Kriston "Kiki" Killgore (1987)
- People's Choice & Fan Favorite: Brittany Toll (2011)

== Winners ==
Color key

- Declared as Winner
- Ended as runner-up
- Ended as one of the finalists or semifinalists

Year	Name	Hometown	Age (Note: Age at the time of the Miss USA pageant)	Local title	Placement at Miss USA	Special awards at Miss USA	Notes
2026	Cara Rgnonti	Rio Rancho	26	Miss Rio Rancho	Top 20		
2025	Dominique Ehrl Lugo	Santa Fe	31	Miss Land of Enchantment			
2024	Mackenzie Sydow	Albuquerque	22	Miss Uptown			
2023	Bianca Wright	Anthony	28	Miss Anthony	Top 20		
2022	Suzanne Perez	Portales	25	Miss Portales	Top 12		First Filipino American Miss New Mexico USA
2021	Christa Schafer	Las Cruces	26	Miss Las Cruces			
2020	Cecilia Rodriguez	South Valley	27	Miss South Valley			Longest reigning Miss New Mexico USA at 1 year, 6 months and 20 days
2019	Alejandra Gonzalez	Las Cruces	26	Miss Las Cruces	1st runner-up		
2018	Kristen Leyva	Las Cruces	23	Miss Billy The Kid			New Mexico State University Graduate 2016, Mechanical Engineering
2017	Ashley Mora	Albuquerque	25	Miss Land of Enchantment			Previously Miss New Mexico World 2015; Top 22 at Miss World America 2015
2016	Naomie Germain	Bernalillo	22	Miss Paradise Hills			
2015	Alexis Duprey	Alamogordo	24	Miss Mesilla Valley			Triple crown winner: Previously Miss New Mexico Teen USA 2009; Previously Miss New Mexico 2013
2014	Kamryn Blackwood	Farmington	22	Miss Farmington			
2013	Kathleen Elizabeth Danzer	Rio Rancho	24	Miss Rio Ancho			
2012	Jessica Martin	Las Cruces	21	Miss Las Cruces			
2011	Brittany Toll	Las Cruces	22	Miss Billy The Kid	Top 16		People's Choice & Fan Favorite in Swimwear Competition; Previously Miss New Mexico Teen USA 2005 and Top 10 at Miss Teen USA 2005
2010	Rosanne Dene Aguilar	Sunland Park	23	Miss Sunland Park			Sister of Raelene Aguilar, Miss New Mexico USA 2008 & Miss New Mexico Teen USA 2000.
2009	Bianca Matamoros-Koonce	Albuquerque	22	Miss Zia			
2008	Raelene Aguilar	Sunland Park	26	Miss Sunland Park			Previously Miss New Mexico Teen USA 2000
2007	Casey Messer	Alamogordo	23	Miss Land of Enchantment			
2006	Onawa Lacy	Gallup	23	Miss Highland			
2005	Jacqueline Deaner	Las Cruces	25				
2004	Jenna Hardin	Lovington	21		Semi-finalist, Finishing in 13th Place		
2003	Alina Ogle	Albuquerque	21		Semi-finalist, Finishing in 6th Place		Previously Miss New Mexico Teen USA 1999
2002	Ellen Colyer	Farmington					
2001	Jennifer Adams	Las Cruces					
2000	Christina Ortega	Las Cruces					
1999	Michelle Rios	Santa Teresa	23		Top 5, Finishing in 5th Place		
1998	Maya Strunk	Farmington					
1997	Tanya Harris	Tatum					
1996	Layla Linn						
1995	Jacqueline Grice	Albuquerque					
1994	Jill Vasquez	Albuquerque	24				Previously Miss New Mexico Teen USA 1988 and top 10 at Miss Teen USA 1988; Former co-director of the Miss California USA and Miss California Teen USA pageants under her married name, Jill Vasquez-Foley, Former line captain of the NFL Arizona Cardinals Cheerleaders
1993	Daniela Johnson	Albuquerque					Mother of Annika Bennion, Miss Montana's Outstanding Teen 2020–21, and Bronté Bennion, Miss Montana's Outstanding Teen 2022
1992	Charlotte Holland						
1991	Tiffany Danton						
1990	Larissa Canaday						
1989	Traci Brubaker	Alamogordo					1st runner up in Miss Oktoberfest 1988
1988	Stephanie Storrie	Clovis					2nd runner up in Miss Oktoberfest 1987
1987	Kriston "Kiki" Killgore	Albuquerque	19		Semi-finalist, Finishing in 7th Place	Winner/1st Place - Best State Costume	
1986	Heather Howell	Farmington					
1985	Brenda Denton	Hobbs	21		1st runner-up		1st runner up at Miss Oktoberfest 1984 as Miss Texas; 2nd Runner-up at Miss World 1985
1984	Mai Therese Shanley	Alamogordo	21	Miss Alamogordo	Miss USA 1984		Previously Miss New Mexico 1983; First Asian American Miss New Mexico USA; Semi-finalist at Miss Universe 1984
1983	Kristin Larsen	Santa Fe		Miss Santa Fe			
1982	Lisa Allen	Las Cruces					
1981	Lise Gabrielle Dominique Thevenet	Las Cruces	23				Graduated from New Mexico State University in 1979 and died at age 55 on August 2, 2013, in Greenwood Village, Colorado
1980	Tonia Pamelym Moya	Albuquerque	18	Miss Bernalillo	Originally first runner-up, but due to represent New Mexico at Miss USA, due to Patrick being initially disqualified by contest officials, on grounds that she lived in Texas. Eventually, the latter was able to participate at the national pageant when she got a federal court in El Paso to restore her title.		
1980	Kathy Dawn Patrick	Anthony	19	Miss Anthony	Top 12		1st runner-up at Miss Texas USA 1980; Miss Oktoberfest 1980 as Miss Texas
1979	Michele Sandoval	Albuquerque				Miss Photogenic	
1978	Marlena Garland	Las Cruces			4th runner-up		
1977	Denise Funderburk	Albuquerque			Semi-finalist, Finishing in 12th Place		
1976	Jonelle Bergquist	Albuquerque			Semi-finalist, Finishing in 10th Place		
1975	Maxine Whisler	Albuquerque					
1974	Jan Nilsson	Las Cruces					
1973	Carolyn Cline	Albuquerque	20				Later Miss Florida 1978 and then Miss America 1979 2nd runner up.
1972	Donna Frances Reel	Albuquerque			Top 12		Later Miss New Mexico 1974 and top 10 at Miss America 1975.; Miss New Mexico World 1973 and top 16 at Miss World USA 1973.
1971	Debbie Clary						
1970	Theresa Ann Phillips	Las Cruces	18				
1969	Mary Gard				Semi-finalist, Finishing in 9th Place		
1968	Bonnie Lynn Tafoya	Las Cruces			4th runner-up	Top 15 Best in Swimsuit	
1967	Clydia Newell	Clovis	21				
1966	Susan Franz	Roswell	19				
1965	Judith Lee "Judy" Baldwin	Clovis	19		2nd runner-up		
1964	Did Not Compete						
1963	Sandra Joyce "Sandi" Fullingim	Albuquerque	18		Top 15		
1962	Herma Loy Elliott	Portales					
1961	Georgi Edwards						
1960	Kaye Smith						
1959	Carol Jones						
1959	Sue Ingersoll						Withdrew admidst controversy over the Catholic church's regulations around swimsuit competitions.
1958	Sandi Bullis						
1957	Patricia Stafford						
1956	Jackie Brown	Albuquerque					
1955	Joan Schwartz				Semi-finalist		
1953-1954	Did Not Compete						
1952	Kay Nail						
