= Miss USA 1961 =

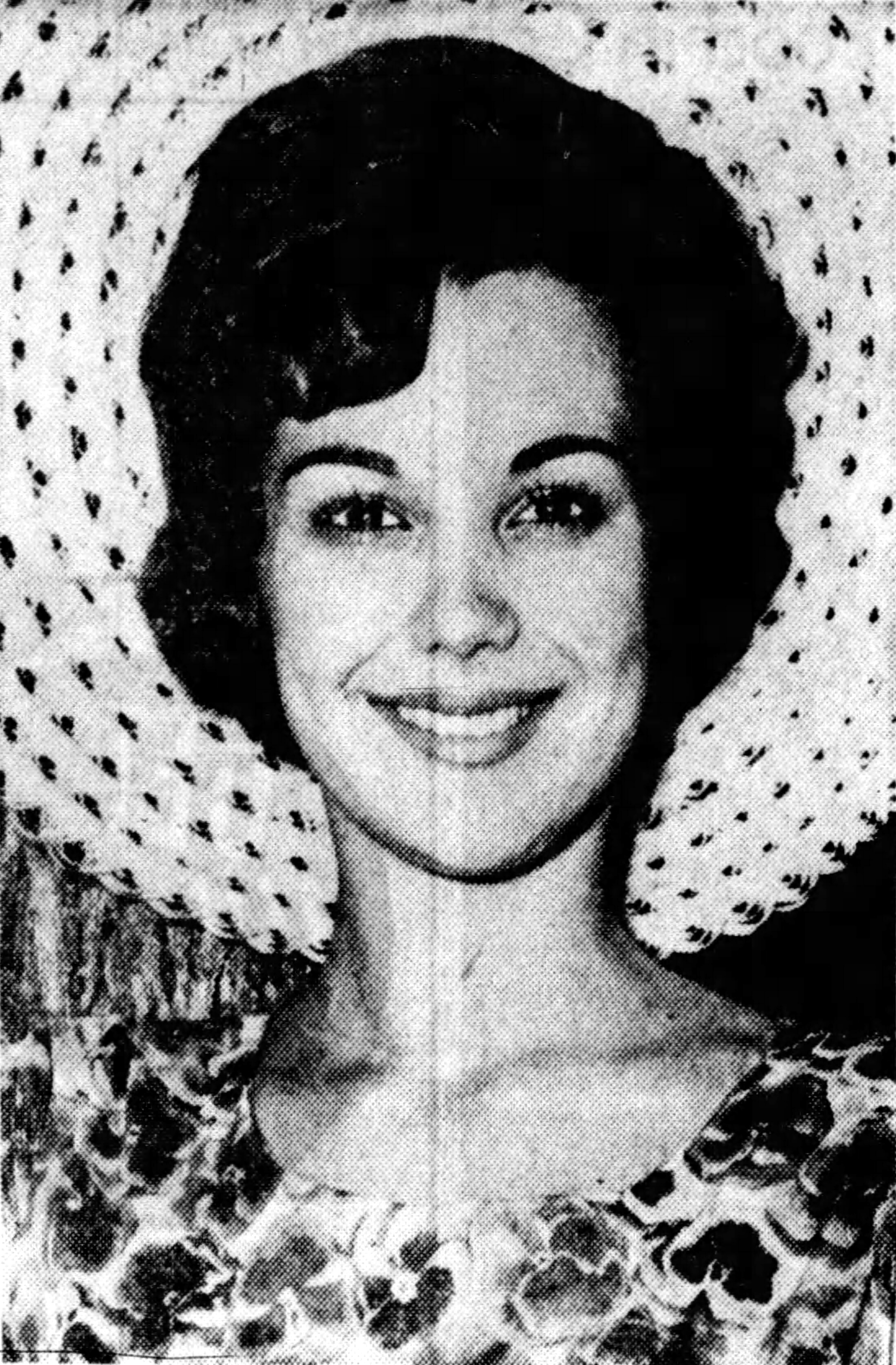
- Sharon Brown
- Date: July 13, 1961
- Venue: Miami Beach Auditorium, Miami Beach, Florida
- Entrants: 43
- Placements: 15
- Withdrawals: Colorado; Hawaii; Minnesota; Montana; North Dakota; Oklahoma; Oregon; Washington
- Winner: Sharon Brown; Louisiana

Miss USA 1961 was the tenth Miss USA pageant, held at the Miami Beach Auditorium, Miami Beach, Florida on July 13, 1961.

At the end of the event, Linda Bement of Utah crowned Sharon Brown of Louisiana as Miss USA 1961. It was the second victory of Louisiana in the pageant's history. Brown later competed at Miss Universe and was named as fourth runner-up to eventual winner, Marlene Schmidt.

Contestants from forty-two states and the District of Columbia competed in this pageant.

== Results ==
=== Placements ===
Placement	Contestant
Miss USA 1961	Louisiana – Sharon Brown
1st runner-up	California – Pamela Stettler
2nd runner-up	Nevada – Karen Weller
3rd runner-up	New York – Alexa Currey
4th runner-up	Alabama – Suellen Robinson
Top 15	Connecticut – Florene Mayette; Kentucky – Marcia Chumbler; Massachusetts – Elaine Cusick; Michigan – Patricia Squires; Mississippi – Marlene Britsch; Nebraska – Gail Weinstock; New Jersey – Diane Giersch; Rhode Island – Joan Zeller; Utah – Janet Hawley; West Virginia – Kathy McManaway

== Contestants ==
Forty-three contestants competed for the title.

State/District	Contestant	Age (Note: Ages at the time of the pageant)	Hometown	Notes
Alabama	Suellen Robinson	20	Fairfax	
Alaska	Judy Onstad	21	Fairbanks	
Arizona	Shyrle Owens	18	Phoenix	
Arkansas	Mickey Lambert	20	El Dorado	
California	Pamela Ray Stettler	18	San Rafael	
Connecticut	Florene Mayette	20	Hartford	
Delaware	Nina Lou Ringler	18	Selbyville	
District of Columbia	Patricia Brunette	–	Washington, D.C.	
Florida	Peggy DeFreitas	22	Miami	
Georgia	Patsy Giddens	–	–	
Idaho	Delcene Kay Rossiter	20	Pocatello	
Illinois	Dianne Duffey	19	Elmhurst	
Indiana	Janice Kay Oliver	18	Indianapolis	
Iowa	Deanne Ostermann	19	Ocheyedan	
Kansas	Dixie Lee Cook	22	Topeka	
Kentucky	Marcia Gale Chumbler	18	Mayfield	
Louisiana	Sharon Rene Brown	18	Minden	4th runner-up at Miss Universe 1961
Maine	Barbara Ann Dyer	–	Dexter	
Maryland	Gail Baxter	–	High Point	
Massachusetts	Elaine Cusick	18	Boston	
Michigan	Patricia Squires	20	Dearborn	
Mississippi	Marlene Britsch	21	Clermont Harbour	
Missouri	Joan Roberts	19	Richmond Heights	
Nebraska	Gail L. Weinstock	20	Omaha	
Nevada	Karen Weller	18	Las Vegas	
New Hampshire	Dianne Ellen Lipson	–	–	
New Jersey	Diane C. Giersch	19	Red Bank	
New Mexico	Georgi Edwards	18	Albuquerque	
New York	Alexa Currey	22	New York City	Replaced Marcia Banks as Miss New York USA
North Carolina	Marie Clyburn	20	Charlotte	
Ohio	Alice Lou Engleman	23	Ashtabula	
Pennsylvania	Gayle Nelson	19	Chester	
Rhode Island	Joan Marie Zeller	23	Riverside	
South Carolina	Yvonne Quick	21	Bennettsville	
South Dakota	Sharon Hoffman	19	Harrisburg	
Tennessee	Anita Atkins	25	Memphis	
Texas	Sheila Wade	18	Dallas	
Utah	Janet Marie Hawley	25	Salt Lake City	
Vermont	Susan Nielson	–	Poultney	
Virginia	Bonnie Jones	18	Norfolk	
West Virginia	Kathy McManaway	20	Princeton	
Wisconsin	Karen Reisweber	21	Milwaukee	
Wyoming	Judy Larae Walton	–	Cokeville	
