= Flickinger Center for Performing Arts =

Theater in Alamogordo, New Mexico, US

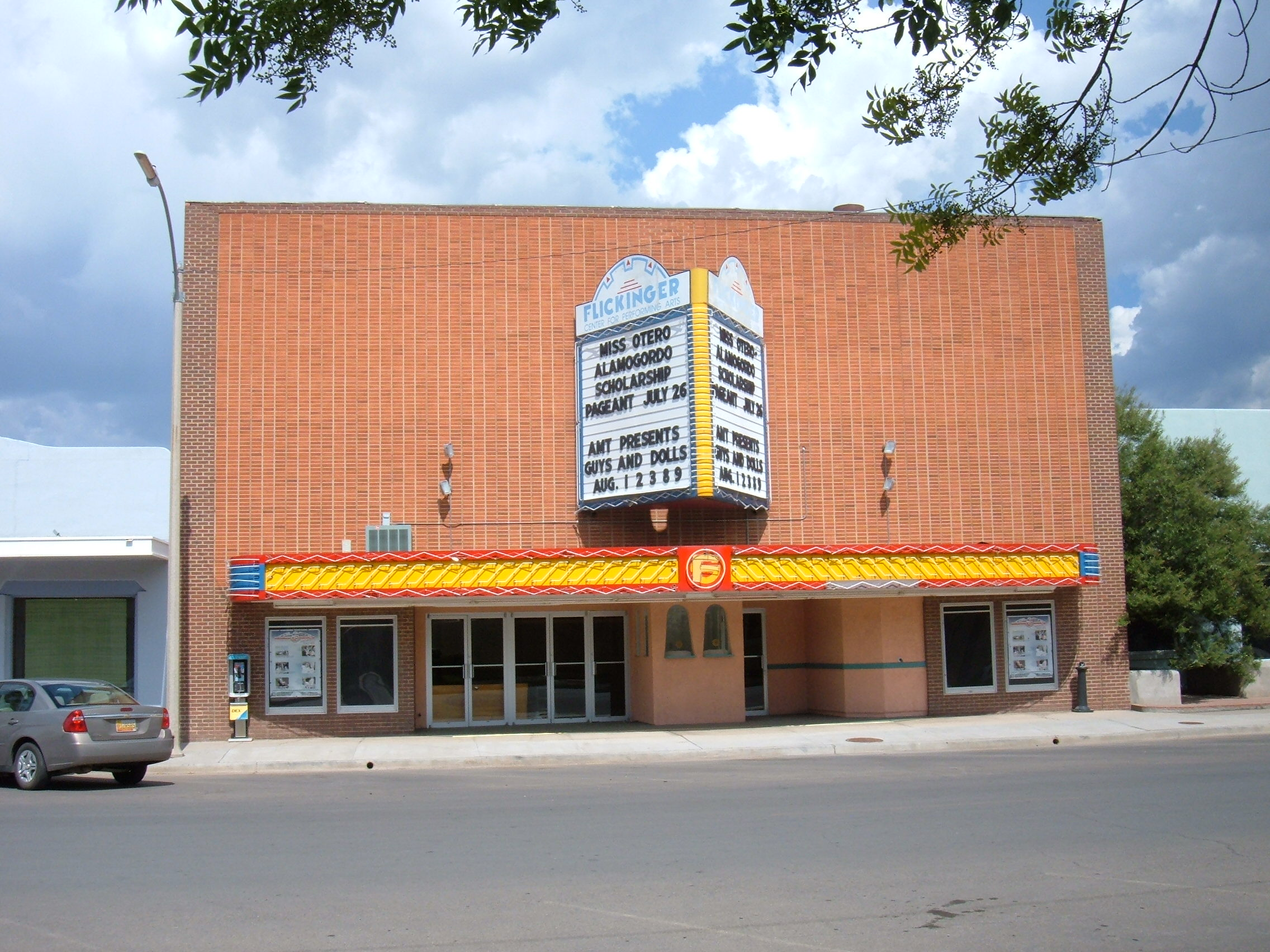
- Flickinger Center in 2008
- Interactive map of Flickinger Center for Performing Arts
- Former names: Sierra Theater
- Address: 1110 New York Avenue
- Location: Alamogordo, New Mexico
- Coordinates: 32.9012°N 105.9587°W
- Owner: County of Otero
- Seating type: General admission
- Capacity: 590
- Type: Performing arts center

Website
- http://www.flickingercenter.com/

Flickinger Center for Performing Arts is a 590-seat theater in Alamogordo, New Mexico. This is also the name of the nonprofit organization that operates the theater. The Flickinger Center put on a variety of entertainment, including concerts, plays, musicals, dance recitals, and beauty pageants, both by professional stage companies and by local amateur groups.

== History ==
The nonprofit Alamogordo Civic Auditorium, Inc. was created in 1983 to provide a facility for the performing arts in Alamogordo and Otero County. In 1988 Alamogordo resident Margaret Flickinger bought the Sierra Theater, a 1950s-style movie theater, and donated it to the organization. The theater and the organization were renamed Flickinger Center for the Performing Arts. The inaugural performance at the theater was in December 1988 by the New Mexico Symphony Orchestra. The inaugural season started in October 1992.

The building has undergone two major renovations. In 1990–1991 the Flickinger Center organization ran a capital campaign that raised $1 million, until then the largest fund-raising campaign ever held in Alamogordo. The movie theater was converted into a live theater by creating a 40-foot (12 m) by 32-foot (9.8 m) stage and adding an orchestra pit, dressing rooms, a wardrobe and orchestra room, and additional lighting. A second round of renovation was performed in 2007, after securing capital outlay grants of $1 million from the State of New Mexico. This renovation provided additional restrooms, a new sound booth, a handicapped-seating area, and an ADA-compliant ramp. At the end of the second renovation the theater had given up 90 seats and seated 590.

== Governance and operation ==
In 2003 the organization transferred ownership of the building to the County of Otero, and received a lease on the property with an option to purchase. Ownership was transferred so that state funding could be used to renovate the building. The organization pays no rent, but provides services to Otero County including some performances that are free to County residents.

The Flickinger Guild, founded in 1991, is a volunteer group that does most of the operating work of the Center, and does some fundraising.

== Programs ==
The Flickinger Center presents a variety of entertainment, including concerts, plays, musicals, dance recitals, and beauty pageants. Shows include both professional stage productions and local amateur groups.

Alamogordo Music Theater, a local amateur group, has performed most of its shows since 1989 at the Center. During the summer the Flickinger Center organization presents the Tailgate Summer Jazz Series, outdoor concerts performed in the parking lot of the New Mexico Museum of Space History. The Miss New Mexico Scholarship Pageant is held each June at the Flickinger Center; it has been held in Alamogordo since 1998.
