= Terri Britt =

American actress and author (born 1961)

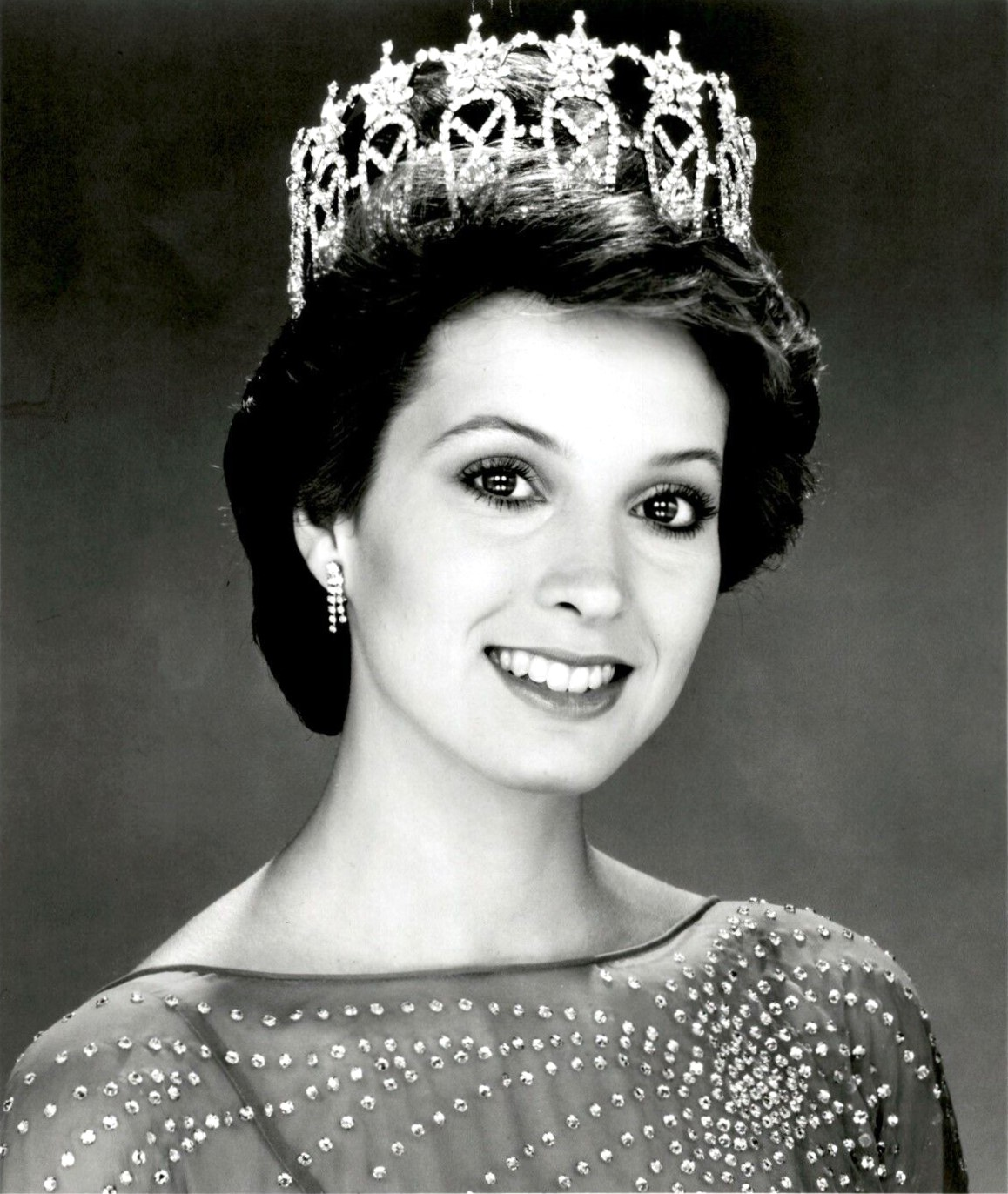
- Utley wearing her Miss USA crown in 1982
- Born: Terri Lea Utley; 19 November 1961 (age 64); Cabot, Arkansas, U.S.
- Other names: Terri Britt; Terri Amos-Britt; Terri Britt
- Education: Cabot High School, University of Central Arkansas
- Occupations: Author, Speaker, Spiritual Coach
- Known for: Women and family empowerment
- Notable work: The Enlightened Mom; Message Sent; Women Gone Wild Intuition; News Anchor at MovieTime (Now E!)
- Height: 1.73 m (5 ft 8 in)
- Spouse(s): Steven Amos (m. 1990; died 2007) Charlie Britt (m. 2008)
- Beauty pageant titleholder
- Title: Miss Arkansas USA 1982; Miss USA 1982
- Hair color: Brown
- Eye color: Brown
- Major competitions: Miss Arkansas USA 1982; (Winner); Miss USA 1982; (Winner); Miss Universe 1982; (4th Runner-Up)
- Website: terribritt.com

Terri Britt (née Utley; born November 19, 1961) is an American author, journalism and beauty pageant titleholder. Britt worked as a news anchor for MovieTime (now E!) and was crowned Miss USA 1982.

== Early life ==
Britt was born in Little Rock, Arkansas, on November 19, 1961. As a young woman, Britt was involved in the American Legion Auxiliary Girls State program. She was also vice-president of the Cabot High School class of 1980.

== Miss USA ==
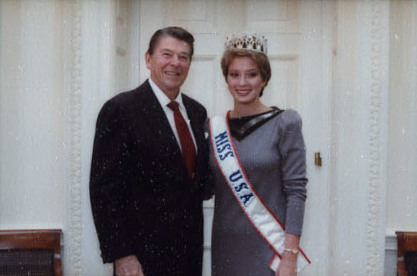
Utley with President Ronald Reagan in 1982

Britt won her first major pageant title, Miss Arkansas USA, in early 1982. She went on to win the title Miss USA in the nationally televised pageant held in Biloxi, Mississippi in May 1982. She was twenty years old at the time.

Britt went on to represent the United States in the Miss Universe pageant in Lima, Peru, in July of the same year. Her national costume was a Native American. In that pageant, she finished as fourth runner-up to Karen Dianne Baldwin of Canada.

Britt is the first Miss USA titleholder from Arkansas. After she won the title, no women from Arkansas placed in the pageant until Jessica Furrer's semi-finalist placement in 2005. Both women are members of Alpha Sigma Tau.

== Career ==
After passing on her title, Britt studied journalism, becoming a writer and field producer for the NBC affiliate KCRA-TV in Sacramento. She then became a spokeswoman for Mazda. Britt then worked as a news anchor on Movietime television (now known as E!).

== Author ==
Britt went on to write Message Sent: Retrieving the Gift of Love, and The Enlightened Mom: A Mother's Guide for Bringing Peace, Love & Light to Your Family’s Life, which won the Best Spiritual Book of the Year at both 2011 New York and San Francisco Book Festivals. She is also a contributing author to the bestselling book, Women Gone Wild~Intuition.

Since 2000, she has been a spiritual coach.

In 2023, she presented a TEDx, Unconditional Self-Love: A New Family Paradigm to carry on her message of helping families get off of the societal hamster wheel to thrive instead of simply survive.

In 2024, Britt was named by Life & Style Magazine as one of the Top 10 Impact Leaders to Follow in 2024.

== Personal life ==
Britt is a wife, mom, stepmom, and grandmother, and resides in the North Georgia mountains where she is the co-owner of JumpinGoat Coffee Roasters with her husband Charlie Britt.

== Bibliography ==
- Message Sent: Retrieving the Gift of Love, ISBN 0-9719694-0-X
- Shimoff, Marci; Britt, Terri (30 November 2014), The Enlightened Mom: A Mother's Guide for Bringing Peace, Love & Light to Your Family's Life, WorldofLite, ISBN 978-0-9719694-4-5
- Women Gone Wild: The Feminine Guide To Fearless Living, Brown Books Publishing Group, 26 September 2023, ISBN 9781612546384
