= Miss Michigan World =

American beauty pageant

- Formation: 1951
- Type: Beauty pageant
- Headquarters: Brighton
- Location: Michigan
- Members: Miss World America (1951–present)
- Official language: English
- State Director: Laurie DeJack
- Website: Official Website

The Miss Michigan World competition is a beauty pageant that selects the representative for Michigan in the Miss World America pageant.

The current Miss Michigan World is Emily Tomchin of Ann Arbor.

== Winners ==
Color key

- Declared as Winner/Ended as Miss World America
- Ended as runner-up
- Ended as one of the finalists or semifinalists
- Ended as special awards winner
- Ended as Miss USA

Year	Name	Hometown	Age (Note: Age at the time of the Miss World America pageant)	Placement at Miss World America	Special awards at Miss World America	Notes
2020	Emily Tomchin	Ann Arbor				Previously Miss Earth Michigan 2019 and a contestant at Miss Earth USA 2019.
2019	Kathy Zhu	Ann Arbor	20	Did not compete		Dethroned after posts on her social media accounts surfaced which were deemed "Racist", "Islamophobic" and "Insensitive".
2018	Azia Hernandez	Detroit	24	Top 10		Previously Miss Michigan World 2016 and Top 12 semifinalist at Miss World America 2016.
2017	Did not compete					
2016	Azia Hernandez	Detroit	22	Top 12		
2015	Cristi Fisher	Lake Orion	22			
Miss Michigan United States 2014
2014	Heather Laymond					
Miss Michigan World
2013	No titleholders as Miss World America was designated from 2006 to 2013.					
2012	No titleholders as Miss World America was designated from 2006 to 2013.					
2011	No titleholders as Miss World America was designated from 2006 to 2013.					
2010	No titleholders as Miss World America was designated from 2006 to 2013.					
2009	No titleholders as Miss World America was designated from 2006 to 2013.					
2008	No titleholders as Miss World America was designated from 2006 to 2013.					
2007	No titleholders as Miss World America was designated from 2006 to 2013.					
2006	No titleholders as Miss World America was designated from 2006 to 2013.					
2005	No known representatives from Michigan from 2003 to 2005.					
2004	No known representatives from Michigan from 2003 to 2005.					
2003	No known representatives from Michigan from 2003 to 2005.					
2002	No titleholders as Miss World America was designated from 1995 to 2002.					
2001	No titleholders as Miss World America was designated from 1995 to 2002.					
2000	No titleholders as Miss World America was designated from 1995 to 2002.					
1999	No titleholders as Miss World America was designated from 1995 to 2002.					
1998	No titleholders as Miss World America was designated from 1995 to 2002.					
1997	No titleholders as Miss World America was designated from 1995 to 2002.					
1996	No titleholders as Miss World America was designated from 1995 to 2002.					
1995	No titleholders as Miss World America was designated from 1995 to 2002.					
1994	Lainie Lu Howard	St. Joseph		1st Runner-up		Previously Miss Michigan USA 1992 and a contestant at Miss USA 1992.
1993	Shannon Clark			Top 7		
1992	Kimberly Snoes					
Miss Michigan USA 1981-1991
1991	Leann Rothi		18			
1990	Carole Gist	Detroit	20	Miss USA 1990		1st Runner-up at Miss Universe 1990
1989	Karen Finucan	Birmingham				
1988	Anthonia Dotson	Detroit				
1987	Elizabeth Puleo	Grosse Pointe				
1986	Lisa Bernardi	Carleton				
1985	Nancy Mazuro	Washington				
1984	Adriana Krambeck	Dearborn Heights				
1983	Kimberly Mexicotte	Livonia		Top 12		
1982	Diane Marie Arabia	Warren		Top 12		4th runner-Up in Miss Oktoberfest 1981; Previously Miss Michigan World 1980 and Top 15 semi-finalist at Miss World America 1980.
1981	Karen Eidson	Hazel Park				
Miss Michigan World
1980	Diane Marie Arabia	Warren		Top 15		Later Miss Michigan USA 1982 and Top 12 semi-finalist at Miss USA 1982.
1979	Cindy Boufford					
1978	Denise Noffsinger					
1977	Denise Ostrowski					
1976	Kimberly Marre Foley	Southfield	21	Miss World USA 1976		Unplaced at Miss World 1976.
1975	Cynthia Mimi Guenther					
1974	Marilyn Ann Petty	Roseville		2nd Runner-up		Previously Miss Michigan USA 1972 and Top 12 semi-finalist at Miss USA 1972.
1973	Corrine L. Bozin					
1972	Karen R. Kistier					
1971	Gwen Marie Humble	St. Clair Shores	17	1st Runner-up		
1970	Sally Ann Stretton			1st Runner-up		
1969	Jonn Ricca					
1968	Sue Stanford					Competed as Michigan
1968	Elaine Lynette Kissel	Detroit				Competed as Detroit, Michigan
1967	Janice Marie Cailotto					Competed as Michigan.
1967	Elaine Lynette Kissel	Detroit				Competed as Detroit, Michigan
1966	Johneane Teeter					Competed as Michigan. Previously Miss Michigan USA 1964 and a contestant at Miss USA 1964.
1966	Unknown	Detroit				Competed as Detroit, Michigan.
1965	Sharon Magnuson					Competed as Michigan
1965	Vicki Hurley	Detroit				Competed as Detroit, Michigan
1964	Susan Lynne Pill			3rd Runner-up		Competed as Michigan; Later Miss Michigan USA 1965 and Top 15 semi-finalist at Miss USA 1965.
1964	Robin Hoag	Detroit				Competed as Detroit, Michigan
1963	Charlene McKinnon					Competed as Michigan
1963	Terry Lynn Stern	Detroit				Competed as Detroit, Michigan
1962	Carla Rodgers				Miss Congeniality	Competed as Michigan
1962	Janet Clift	Detroit		Top 15		Competed as Detroit, Michigan
1961	Mikki Catsman					
1960	Did not compete					
1959	No known representatives from Michigan in 1958 & 1959.					
1958	No known representatives from Michigan in 1958 & 1959.					
Miss Michigan USA 1953-1957
1957	Sharon Moore					
1956	Barbara Sias			Top 15		
1955	Martha Smith					
1954	Gerri Hoffman					
1953	Jo Ann Page					
Miss Michigan World
1952	No known representatives from Michigan in 1951 & 1952.					
1951	No known representatives from Michigan in 1951 & 1952.					

Notes to table
