= Miss USA 1963 =

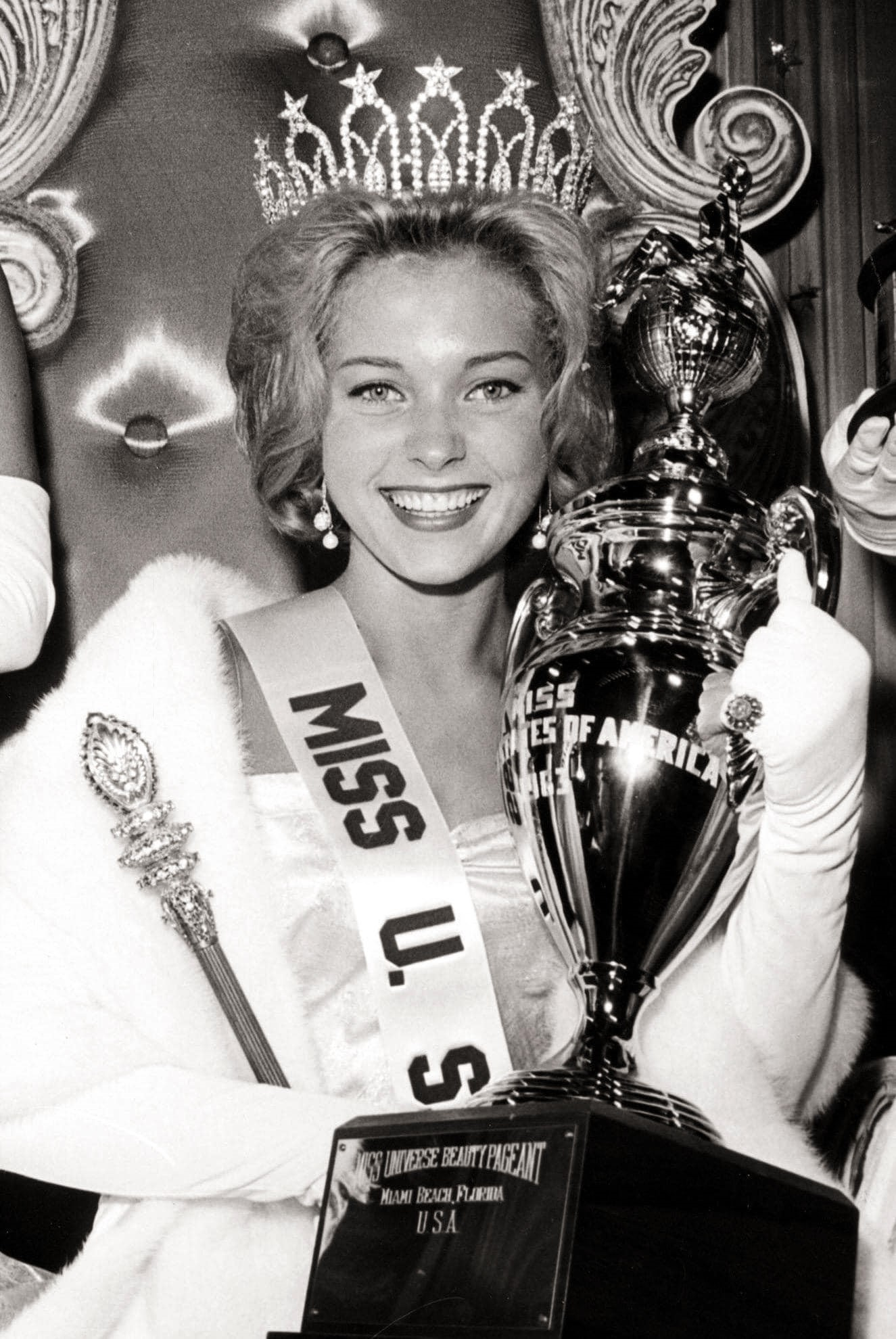
- Marite Ozers as Miss USA 1963
- Date: July 17, 1963
- Venue: Miami Beach, Florida
- Broadcaster: CBS, WTVJ
- Entrants: 43
- Placements: 15
- Withdrawals: Idaho; Minnesota; Montana; North Dakota; South Dakota; Virginia; Washington; Wyoming
- Winner: Marite Ozers; Illinois

Miss USA 1963 was the 12th Miss USA pageant, held at the Miami Beach Auditorium, Miami Beach, Florida on July 17, 1963. This was the first Miss USA to be broadcast on television, first aired on CBS.

At the end of the event, Macel Wilson of Hawaii crowned Marite Ozers of Illinois as Miss USA 1963. Latvian-born Ozers was the first woman born outside the United States to win the title, and the second delegate from Illinois to do so. Ozers later competed at Miss Universe and was named one of the fifteen semi-finalists.

Contestants from forty-two states and the District of Columbia competed in the pageant.

== Results ==
=== Placements ===
Placement	Contestant
Miss USA 1963	Illinois – Marite Ozers
1st runner-up	District of Columbia – Michele Metrinko
2nd runner-up	Missouri – Sandra Marlin
3rd runner-up	Colorado – Rhea Looney
4th runner-up	California - Francine Herack
Top 15	Alabama – Dinah Armstrong; Arizona – Diane McGarry; Massachusetts – Sandra Smith; Michigan – Pamela Sands; Nevada – Kathee Francis; New Mexico – Sandra Fullingim; New York – Jeanne Quinn; Oklahoma – Roberta Mosier; South Carolina – Cecelia Yoder; Tennessee – Bobbie Morrow

== Contestants ==
Forty-three contestants competed for the title.

State/District	Contestant	Age (Note: Ages at the time of the pageant)	Hometown	Notes
Alabama	Dinah Irene Armstrong	19	Montgomery	
Alaska	Nina Whaley	19	Fairbanks	
Arizona	Diane McGarry	20	Phoenix	
Arkansas	Cheryl Jane Bechtelheimer	19	Camden	
California	Francine Cheryl Herack	19	Hollywood	
Colorado	Rhea Looney	19	Denver	
Connecticut	Gail Dinan	19	Hartford	
Delaware	Susan Kowalski	18	Newport	
District of Columbia	Michele Bettina Metrinko	18	Washington, D.C.	Later Miss USA World 1963; Semi-finalist at Miss World 1963; Sister of Marsha Metrinko, Miss Maryland USA 1963; Candidate for the Republican nomination in the 2010 U.S. House of Representatives election in Delaware for Delaware's at-large congressional district
Florida	Linda Egland	18	South Miami	
Georgia	Brenda Seagraves	19	Winterville	
Hawaii	Susan Molina	18	Honolulu	Later Miss Hawaii World 1963; Semi-finalist at Miss USA World 1963
Illinois	Marite Ozers	19	Chicago	Previously Miss Chicago World 1962; Semi-finalist at Miss Universe 1963
Indiana	Vickie Little	20	Indianapolis	
Iowa	Ramona Kathleen Meylor	23	Le Mars	
Kansas	Diane Victoria Stalker	21	Wichita	
Kentucky	Mary Ann Arnold	20	Calvert City	
Louisiana	Margaret Susan "Peggy" Romero	18	Kaplan	
Maine	Laurel Ann Barker	21	Portland	
Maryland	Marsha Barbara Metrinko	21	Laurel	Later Miss New York City at Miss America 1964; Sister of Michele Metrinko, Miss District of Columbia USA 1963
Massachusetts	Sandra Smith	23	Newton Upper Falls	
Michigan	Pamela Lee Sands	19	Ludington	
Mississippi	Joan Kinnebrew	19	Hattiesburg	Competed at Miss Dixie 1964
Missouri	Sandra Lee Marlin	19	Springfield	
Nebraska	Sandy Zimmer	–	Kearney	Replaced Cheryl Warden due to publicity issues
Nevada	Kathee Francis	20	Las Vegas	
New Hampshire	Johnnye McLeod	18	Hampton	
New Jersey	Judy Kay Ayers	–	Salem	
New Mexico	Sandra Fullingim	18	Albuquerque	
New York	Jeanne Marie Quinn	19	East Meadow	Later Miss USA World 1964; Semi-finalist at Miss World 1964; Named 1st runner up at Miss American Beauty 1964
North Carolina	Trudy Ann Cauthen	–	Newton	
Ohio	Gloria Jean McBride	21	Columbus	Replaced Andrea Getzlaff for being underage
Oklahoma	Roberta Ann Mosier	19	Tulsa	
Oregon	Joset Fisher	20	Portland	
Pennsylvania	Deborah Cardonick	19	Philadelphia	
Rhode Island	Rosemary Jane Dickinson	19	Providence	
South Carolina	Cecelia Yoder	20	Lancaster	Competed at Miss USA World 1963
Tennessee	Bobbie Lynn Morrow	26	Memphis	
Texas	Cheryl Rene Wilburn	18	Houston	
Utah	Carla Ann Dinius	22	Salt Lake City	
Vermont	Ellen Centerbar	–	North Bennington	
West Virginia	Nina Lou Denton	–	Marmet	
Wisconsin	Lynn Korchunoff	18	Milwaukee	
