= Miss USA 1974 =

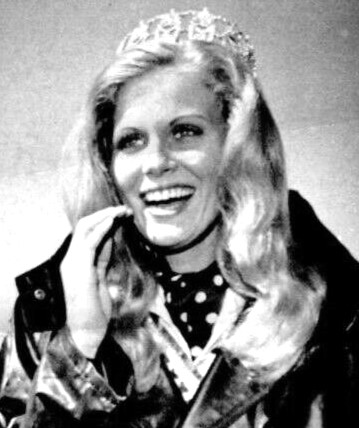
- Miss USA 1974 Karen Morrison the day after her victory
- Date: May 18, 1974
- Presenters: Bob Barker
- Venue: Niagara Falls Convention and Civic Center, Niagara Falls, New York
- Broadcaster: CBS; WBEN-TV
- Entrants: 51
- Placements: 12
- Winner: Karen Morrison; Illinois
- Congeniality: Donna Thornton; Vermont
- Photogenic: Barbara Cooper; New York

Miss USA 1974 was the 23rd Miss USA pageant, televised live by CBS from Niagara Falls, New York on May 18, 1974.

The pageant was won by Karen Jean Morrison of Illinois, who was crowned by outgoing titleholder Amanda Jones, also of Illinois.

Judges included psychologist Joyce Brothers, actor George Peppard, football player Paul Hornung, fashion designer John Weitz, and Sylvia Hitchcock, who won Miss USA 1967 and Miss Universe 1967.

Morrison was the fourth woman from Illinois to win the Miss USA title (a record at the time), and went on to place as a semi-finalist at Miss Universe 1974. Coincidentally, first runner up at Miss USA 1973 was Miss New York. It happened again at Miss USA 1974 when Miss New York (Miss USA 1973 & Miss USA 1974 held in New York) was first runner up with both winner from Illinois.

== Results ==
=== Placements ===
Final results	Contestant
Miss USA 1974	Illinois – Karen Jean Morrison
1st Runner-Up	(New York (state)) New York – Barbara Cooper
2nd Runner-Up	Wisconsin – Mary Cook
3rd Runner-Up	California – Gayle Gorrell
4th Runner-Up	North Carolina – Marcia Burton
Top 12	Arizona – Carlys Peterson; (Washington, D.C.) District of Columbia – Robin Utterback; Florida – Cynthia Zach; Louisiana – Karen Hoff; Missouri – Dorothy McAlveen; Nevada – Linda Dryden; South Dakota – Debra Ann Brickley

=== Special awards ===
Award	Contestant
Miss Amity (Congeniality)	Vermont – Donna Thornton
Miss Photogenic	New York – Barbara Cooper
Best State Costume	Kentucky - Charlesy Gulick

== Delegates ==
The Miss USA 1974 delegates were:

- Alabama – Wyna Lavas
- Alaska – Cyndi Dickerson
- Arizona – Carlys Peterson
- Arkansas – Gina Huddle
- California - Gayle Gorrell
- Colorado – Connie Larsen
- Connecticut – Valerie Ann Cappello
- Delaware – Cheryl Fetkenher
- (Washington, D.C.) District of Columbia – Robin Utterback
- Florida – Cynthia Zach
- (Georgia (U.S. state)) Georgia – Vicki Lynn Ross
- Hawaii – Joan Marie Ottensmeyer
- Idaho – Darla Jan Dowden
- Illinois – Karen Jean Morrison
- Indiana – Lisa Childress
- Iowa – Susan Thompson
- Kansas – Lorraine Breckenridge
- Kentucky – Charlesy Ann Gulick
- Louisiana – Karen Hoff
- Maine – Rebecca Titcomb
- Maryland – Mary Jo Ruppert
- Massachusetts – Ethellean Hicks
- Michigan – Patricia Loftis
- Minnesota – Gail Ray Johnson
- Mississippi – Denise Clark
- Missouri – Dorothy "Tweedy" McAlveen
- Montana – Carole Aalseth
- Nebraska – Mary Wolff
- Nevada – Linda Dryden
- New Hampshire – June Tedeschi
- New Jersey – Patricia Sims
- New Mexico – Janice Lynn Nilson
- (New York (state)) New York – Barbara Cooper
- North Carolina – Marcia Burton
- North Dakota – Judith Lynn Waltz
- Ohio – Kay Phillips
- Oklahoma – Yugonda Willits
- Oregon – Peggy Anne Gertie
- Pennsylvania – Dorisann Gatalski
- Rhode Island – Debra Anne Cerroni
- South Carolina – Carol Lynn Hollis
- South Dakota – Debra Ann Brickley
- Tennessee – Brin Annette Hendrix
- Texas – Debra Cronin
- Utah – Halene Petersen
- Vermont – Donna Sue Thornton
- Virginia – Hazel Thomas
- (Washington (state)) Washington – Charlene "Char" Rutledge
- West Virginia – Kim Nuzum
- Wisconsin – Mary Cook
- Wyoming – Debbie K. Petty

== Judges ==
- Dr. Joyce Brothers - psychologist, author, TV personality
- Eileen Ford - President of the Ford Modeling Agency
- Pete Gogolak - New York Giants kicker
- Sylvia Hitchcock - Miss Universe 1967
- Geoffrey Holder - actor, dancer, producer
- Paul Hornung - Green Bay Packers kicker
- Dong Kingman - artist
- George Peppard - actor
- Sylvia Sidney - actress
- Rodger Ward - racing driver
- John Weitz - fashion designer
