= Miss Illinois USA =

American beauty pageant competition

- Formation: 1952
- Type: Beauty pageant
- Headquarters: Shawnee
- Location: Kansas
- Members: Miss USA
- Official language: English
- Key people: John M. Vannatta; Jason Vannatta; Jennifer Vannatta-Fisher, State Pageant Director
- Website: Official website

The Miss Illinois USA pageant is a competition that selects the representative for the state Illinois in the Miss USA pageant. It is directed by Vanbros and Associates and is previously directed by D&D Productions from 2001 to 2014 before becoming part of Vanbros organization in 2014, headquartered in Shawnee.

Illinois is one of the most successful states in the competition. It is one of only four states to have won four or more Miss USA titles and one of only four states to win two Miss USA titles in consecutive years. All four winners came from the early history of the competition, with their last Miss USA being Karen Morrison, who held the title in 1974. The pageant's most successful years were from 1984 to 1996, when all but two delegates made the cut at Miss USA. That period was followed by many years without a placement.

In 1986, sisters Tricia and Laura Bach won the title consecutively, the first occasion of this in the history of the Miss Universe organization. Later on, in 1994, Kathleen Farrell, sister of Miss Florida USA 1988, won the title, making the state pageant the first to have two sisters compete in Miss USA.

Until 2013, no Illinois delegate had previously competed at Miss Illinois Teen USA but one was previously competed in Miss Illinois, Stacie Juris became the first former Teen titleholder to appear a crossover in Miss USA, the second-to-the last state to do so (Washington would make its first Teen to Miss crossover four years later). The most recent placement was Grace Rodi placing Top 20 in 2024.

Vivica Lewandowski of Barrington was crowned Miss Illinois USA 2026 on May 24, 2026, at Braden Auditorium in Normal. She will represent Illinois at Miss USA 2026.

== Gallery of titleholders ==
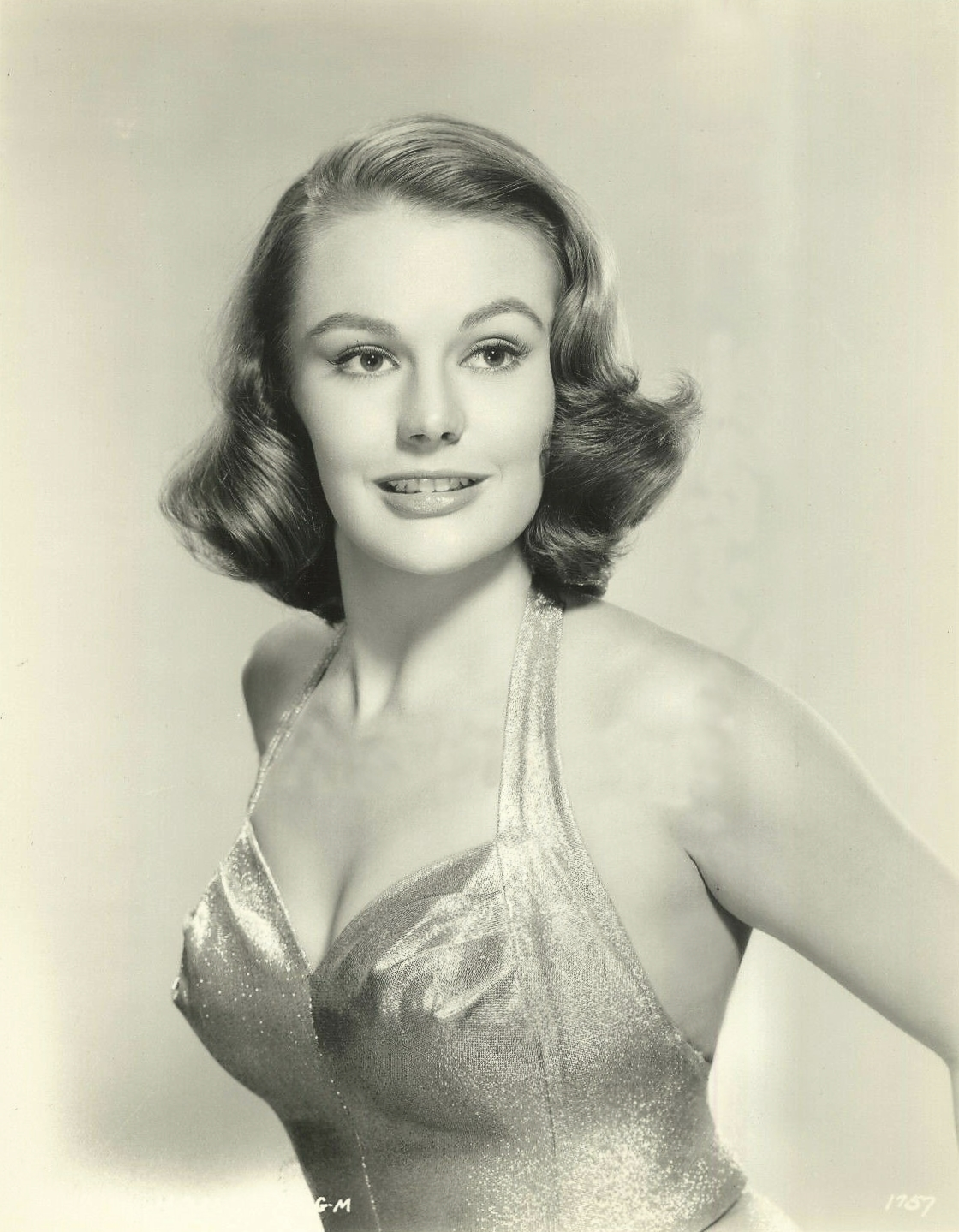
Myrna Hansen, Miss Illinois USA 1953 & Miss USA 1953

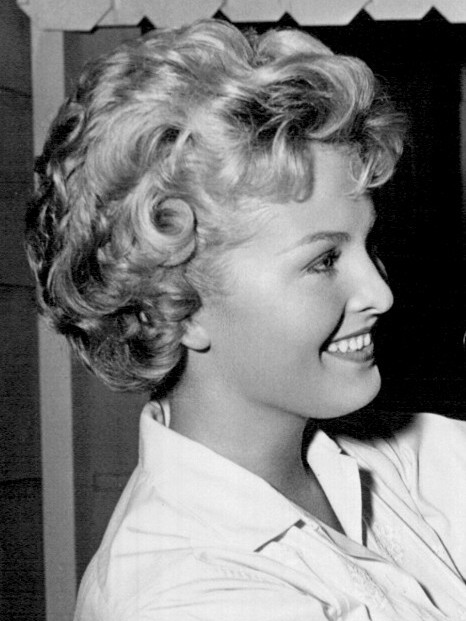
Marianne Gaba, Miss Illinois USA 1957

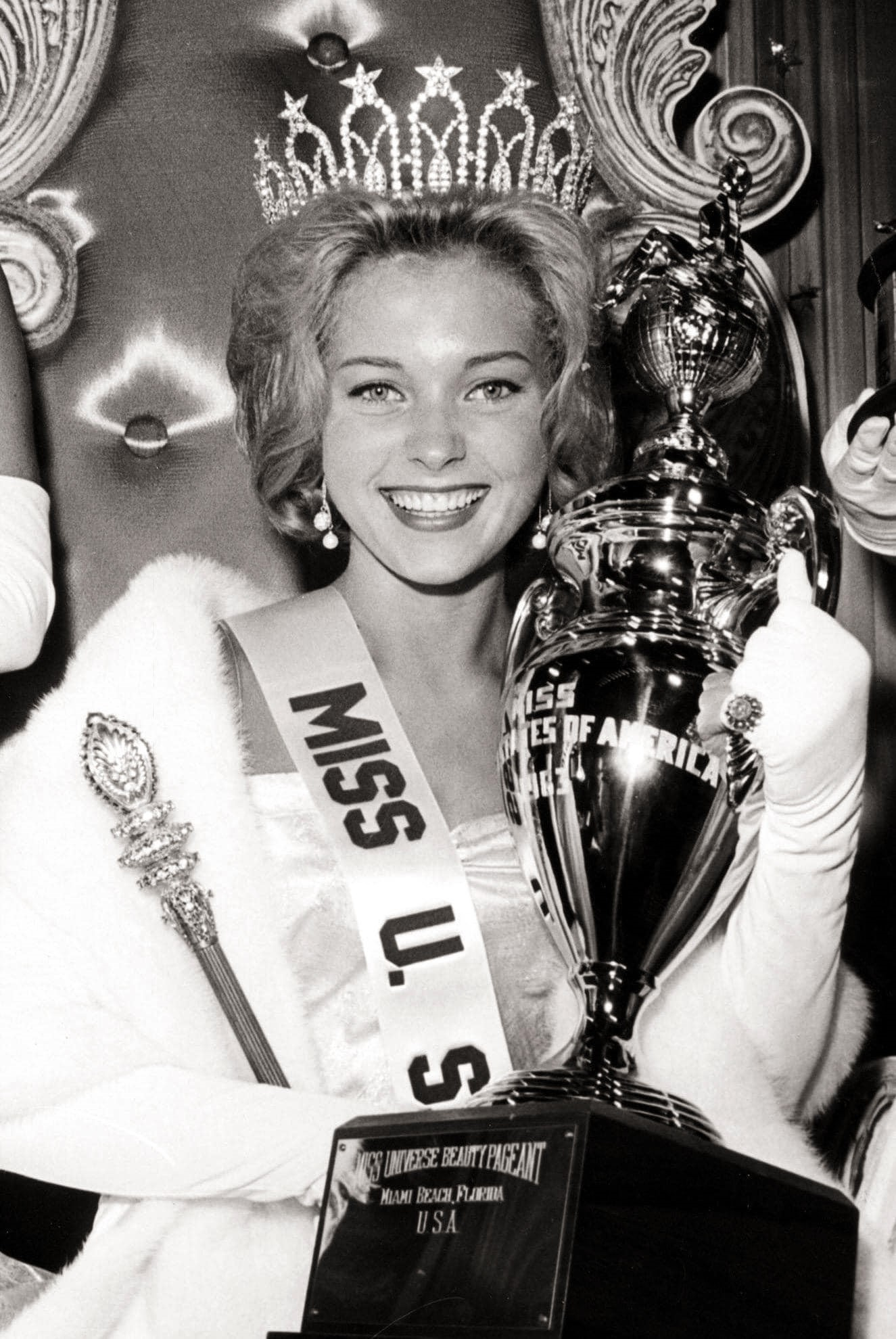
Marite Ozers, Miss Illinois USA 1963 & Miss USA 1963

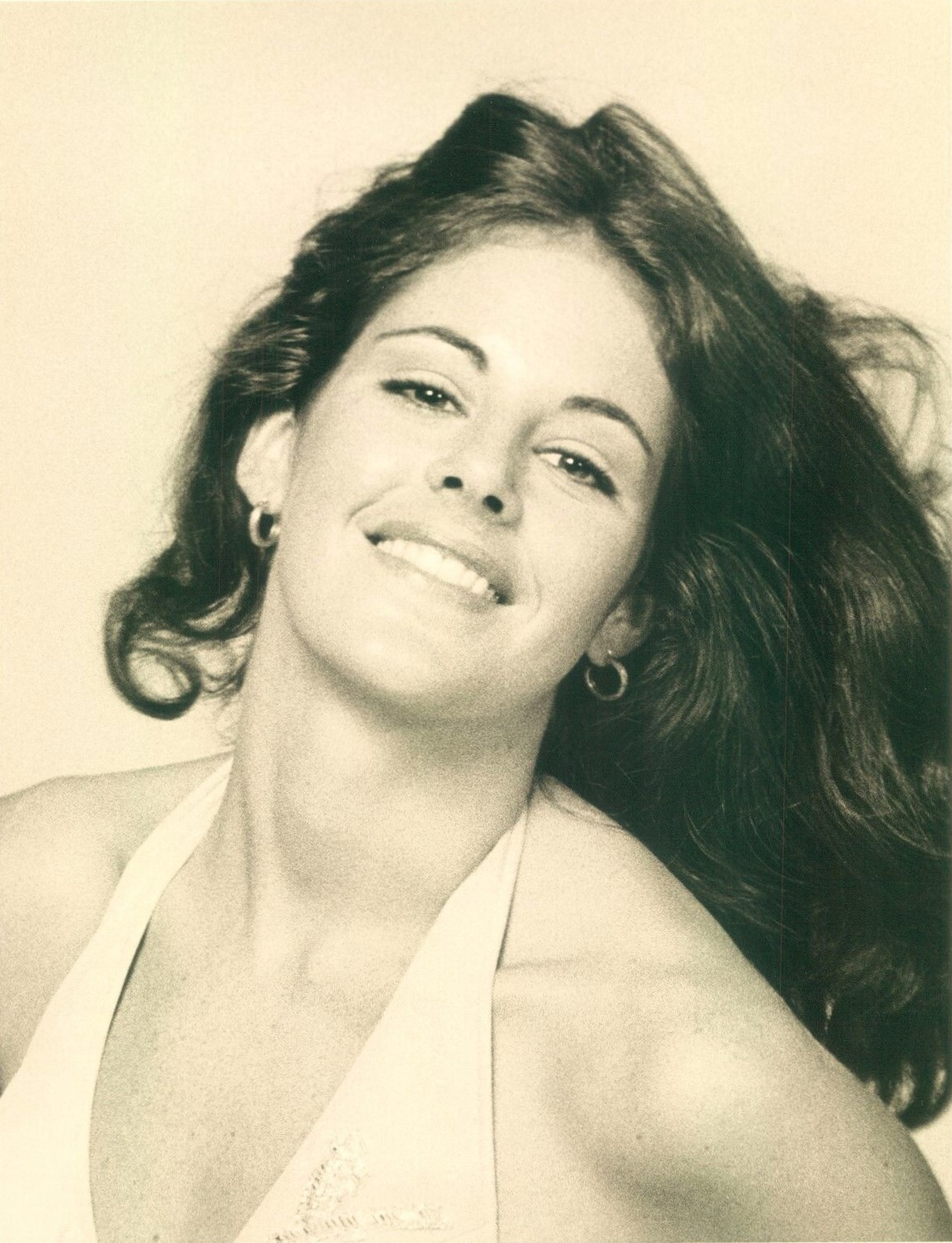
Amanda Jones, Miss Illinois USA 1973 & Miss USA 1973

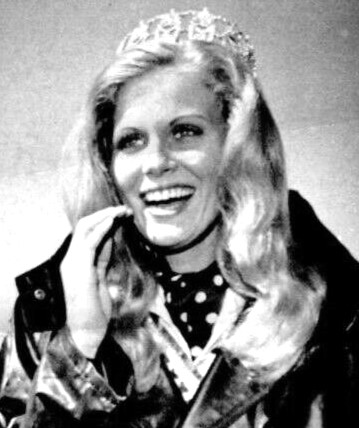
Karen Morrison, Miss Illinois USA 1974 & Miss USA 1974

== Results summary ==
=== Placements ===
- Miss USAs: Myrna Hansen (1953), Marite Ozers (1963), Amanda Jones (1973), Karen Morrison (1974)
- 2nd runners-up: Laura Bach (1985), Nichole Holmes (1995), Stacie Juris (2013)
- 3rd runners-up: June Pickney (1958), Debra Niego (1979), Jill Gulseth (2005), Sydni Dion Bennett (2021)
- 4th runners-up: Celeste Ravel (1954), Angel Reyes (2022)
- Top 5/6: Lisa Morgan (1991), Whitney Wandland (2017)
- Top 10/12: Kathy Schmalen (1976), LaVonne Misselle (1984), Tricia Bach (1986), Joan Berge (1987), Gina Zordani (1988), Kelly Holub (1989), Carla Myers (1990), Kathleen Farrell (1994), Bernadette Przybycien (1996), Olivia Pura (2020)
- Top 15: Dianne Daniggelis (1955), Marianne Gaba (1957), Jean Donnelly (1962), Beverly Lacek (1967), Catherine Warren (2006), Renee Wronecki (2015)
- Top 20: Samantha Elliott (2023), Grace Rodi (2024)

Illinois holds a record of 33 placements at Miss USA.

=== Awards ===
- Miss Photogenic: Elizabeth Curran (1977), Nichole Holmes (1995), Angel Reyes (2022)
- Best State Costume: Kelly Holub (1989)

== Titleholders ==
Color key

- Declared as Winner
- Ended as runner-up
- Ended as one of the finalists or semifinalists

Year	Name	Hometown	Age (Note: Age at the time of the Miss USA pageant)	Local title	Placement at Miss USA	Special awards at Miss USA	Notes
2026	Nana Afua Kusi (Assumed)	Chicago	26	Miss Metro Chicago	Did Not Compete		Originally the first runner-up, assumed the title after Lewandowski was appointed as Miss Universe Poland 2026
2026	Vivica Lewandowski (Resigned)	Barrington	21	Miss Heartland			Previously Miss Illinois Teen USA 2023; Top 20 at Miss Teen USA 2023; Daughter of Miss Illinois USA 1998 Mandy Lane Lewandowski; Months after competing at Miss USA 2026, she was appointed as Miss Universe Poland 2026
2025	Nikolina Vujcic	Des Plaines	23	Miss Des Plaines			Later Miss Universe Serbia 2026
2024	Grace Rodi	Hinsdale	23	Miss Dupage County	Top 20		
2023	Samantha Jo Elliott	Freeport	22	Miss Freeport	Top 20		Represented United States at Miss Cosmo 2024.; Top 5 at Miss Cosmo 2024.
2022	Angeliz "Angel" Reyes	Chicago	25	Miss Hermosa	4th runner-up	Miss Photogenic	Later Miss Charm USA 2024
2021	Sydni Dion Bennett	Algonquin	20	Miss Greater Midwest	3rd runner-up		Previously Miss Illinois Teen USA 2018; 3rd runner-up at Miss Teen USA 2018
2020	Olivia Pura	Deer Park	22	Miss North Shore	Top 10		Previously Miss Illinois Teen USA 2016; Top 15 at Miss Teen USA 2016; Longest reigning Miss Illinois USA at 1 year, 9 months and 25 days
2019	Alexandra Marie Plotz	Geneva	24	Miss Geneva			Previously Miss Illinois Teen USA 2012; Top 16 at Miss Teen USA 2012; Later Miss Illinois World 2019; Top 25 at Miss World America 2019
2018	Karolina Jasko	Franklin Park	20	Miss Franklin Park			
2017	Whitney Wandland	Chicago	24	Miss Greater Chicago	Top 5		Chicago Bulls Luvabull
2016	Zena Malak	Carol Stream	23	Miss Carol Stream			Previously Miss Illinois Galaxy 2011
2015	Renee Wronecki	Burbank	22	Miss Burbank	Top 15		
2014	Alexis "Lexi" Atkins	Champaign	21				Previously Miss Illinois Teen USA 2010; 1st runner-up at Miss Teen USA 2010
2013	Stacie Juris	Tinley Park	22		2nd runner-up		Previously Miss Illinois Teen USA 2009
2012	Ashley Sherelle Hooks	Flossmoor	25				
2011	Angela Sparrow	Chicago	26				Indiana Pacers Pacemate
2010	Ashley Bradarich	Homer Glen	23				Sister of Carlyn Bradarich, Miss Iowa USA 2014
2009	Ashley Bond	Oswego	24				Chicago Bulls Luvabull
2008	Shanon Lersch	Chicago	25				Chicago Bulls Luvabull
2007	Mia Heaston	Chicago	25				
2006	Catherine Warren	Lake Forest	23		Top 15		Contestant on The Bachelor: Officer and a Gentleman
2005	Jill Gulseth	Geneva	21		3rd runner-up		
2004	Molly Graham	Montgomery	24				
2003	Agnieszka Anna "Agnes" Zakreta	Rolling Meadows	24				Miss Tourism International 1999 as Miss Polonia
2002	Amanda Sue Reynolds	Marion	23				Contestant at National Sweetheart 2001
2001	Rebecca Ambrosi	Chicago	24	Miss Lincoln Park			
2000	Constance Renee Stoetzer	Abingdon	26	Miss Peoria			
1999	Christina Marie Lam	Makanda	19				Later Mrs. Tennessee America 2007 under her married name, Christina Ryan; 1st runner-up at Mrs. America 2007
1998	Mandy Jo Lane	Elizabethtown	21				Contestant in Fear Factor USA Christmas Edition (4th place) & Fear Factor USA Second Chance Episode (2nd place)
1997	Jennifer Salinas	South Holland	21				
1996	Bernadette Przybycien	Chicago	24		Semi-finalist		
1995	Nichole Lynn Holmes	Marion	20		2nd runner-up	Miss Photogenic	
1994	Kathleen Farrell	Chicago	24		Top 10 Semi-finalist		Miss Illinois 1992 (non-finalist Talent award at Miss America 1993); Sister of Monica Farrell, Miss Florida USA 1988 who was 3rd runner up at Miss USA 1988
1993	Susie Park	Chicago	25				First Asian American to win the title of Miss Illinois USA
1992	Leilani Magnussen	Glendale Heights	21				
1991	Lisa Michele Morgan	Inverness	21		Top 6		Miss Teenage America 1986.
1990	Karla Myers	Chicago	22		Top 12		
1989	Kelly Holub	Buffalo Grove	22		Semi-finalist	Best State Costume	
1988	Gina Marie Zordani	Palos Heights	23		Semi-finalist		
1987	Joan Elizabeth Berge	Arlington Heights	21		Semi-finalist		
1986	Tricia Therese Bach	Elmhurst	22		Semi-finalist		Miss Teen All American 1983, sister of Miss Illinois USA 1985
1985	Laura Ann Bach	Elmhurst	23		2nd Runner-up		1st runner up at Miss Oktoberfest 1986; Sister of Miss Illinois USA 1986
1984	LaVonne Ranae Misselle	Toluca	19		Semi-finalist		
1983	Vanessa Lon Romine	Rockford	24				
1982	Carla Jo Danielson	Chicago	21				
1981	Leslie Kay Renfrow	Chicago	21				4th runner-up at Miss Oktoberfest 1980
1980	Karen Marie Groat	Princeton	18				
1979	Debra Ann "Debbie" Niego	Oak Lawn	20		3rd Runner-up		Miss Oktoberfest 1979
1978	Suzanne Piché	Lombard	22				Represented Illinois at Miss World USA 1974.
1977	Elizabeth Curran	Park Ridge	21			Miss Photogenic	
1976	Kathy Ann Schmalen	Oak Lawn	18		Semi-finalist		
1975	Connie Reif	Wheeling	18				
1974	Melinda Staiger	Aurora	19				Succeeded Karen Morrison as Miss Illinois USA
1974	Karen Jean Morrison	St. Charles	19		Miss USA 1974		Semifinalist at Miss Universe 1974
1973	Deanna Hanson	Aurora	19				Succeeded Amanda Jones as Miss Illinois USA
1973	Amanda Clara Jones	Evanston	22		Miss USA 1973		1st runner up at Miss Universe 1973
1972	Jani Hall	Big Rock	21				
1971	Paulette Breen	Chicago	24				
1970	Carol Pepoon	Skokie	18				
1969	Christine Jalloway	Chicago	23				
1968	Sandra Ann "Sandie" Wolsfeld	Wheaton	21			Top 15 Best in Swimsuit	Miss World USA 1970, semifinalist in Miss World 1970
1967	Beverly Lacek	Chicago	23		Semi-finalist		
1966	Cheryl Setser	Woodstock	19				
1965	Diane Gortz	Schiller Park	18				
1964	Karen Sue Wiesbrook	Wheaton	18				
1963	Marite Ozers	Chicago	19		Miss USA 1963		Semifinalist at Miss Universe 1963, represented Chicago, IL in Miss USA World 1962, did not place. Born in Latvia.
1962	Jean Donnelly	DeKalb	20		Semi-finalist		
1961	Dianne Duffey	Elmhurst	19				
1960	Patricia "Pat" Thompson	Chicago	21				
1959	Arlene Kaye	Western Springs	19				
1958	June Pickney	Chicago	22		3rd Runner-up		
1957	Marianne Gaba	Chicago	18		Semi-finalist		Playboy playmate September 1959
1956	Muriel "Mickey" Blair	Chicago	23				
1955	Diane Daniggelis	Chicago	18		Semi-finalist		Winner of the 1955 National Press Photographers Pageant
1954	Celeste Ravel	Chicago	23		4th Runner-up		
1953	Myrna Rae Hansen	Chicago	17		Miss USA 1953		1st runner up at Miss Universe 1953; had been a finalist in the National Press Photographers pageant in 1953
1952	Sherri Matulis	Peoria	20				
