= Iêda Maria Vargas =

Brazilian actress and beauty queen (1944–2025)

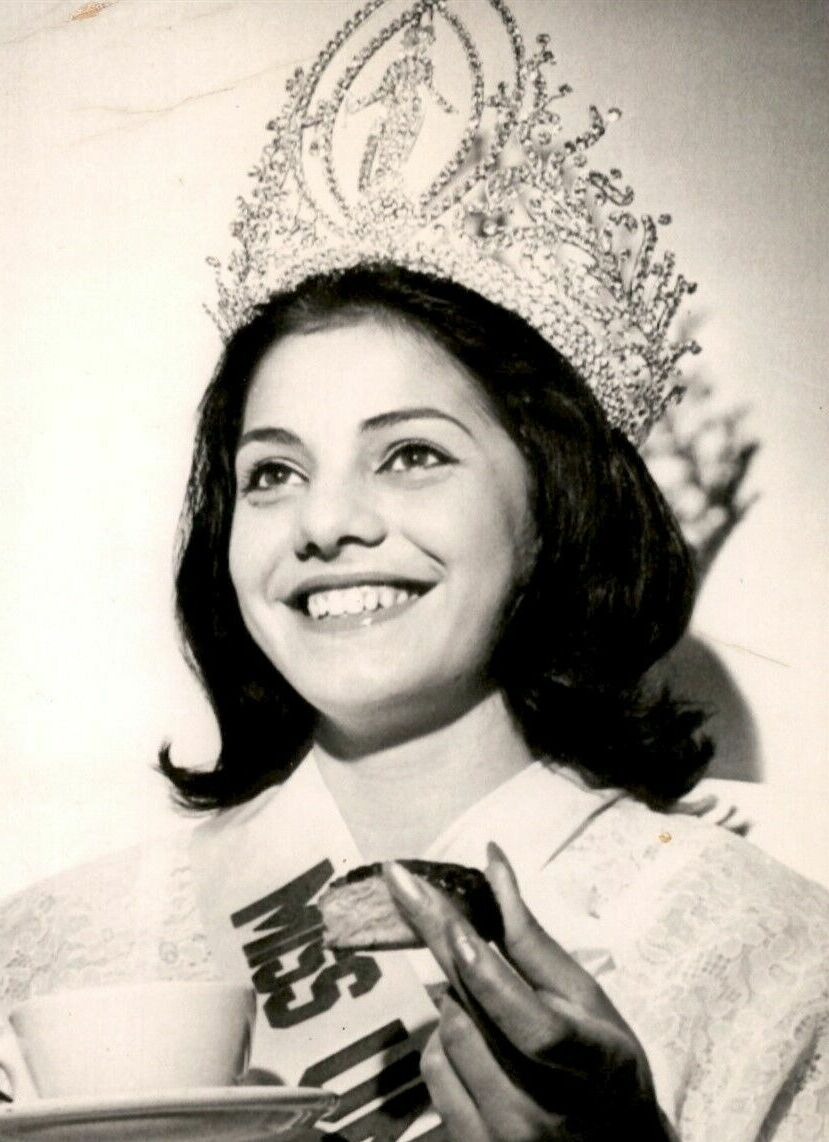
- Vargas as Miss Universe 1963
- Born: Iêda Maria Brutto Vargas; December 31, 1944; Porto Alegre, Rio Grande do Sul, Brazil
- Died: December 22, 2025 (aged 80); Gramado, Serra Gaúcha, Brazil
- Occupations: Actress; beauty queen
- Beauty pageant titleholder
- Title: Miss Brasil 1963; Miss Universe 1963
- Years active: 1963–2025
- Major competitions: Miss Brasil 1963 (Winner); Miss Universe 1963 (Winner)

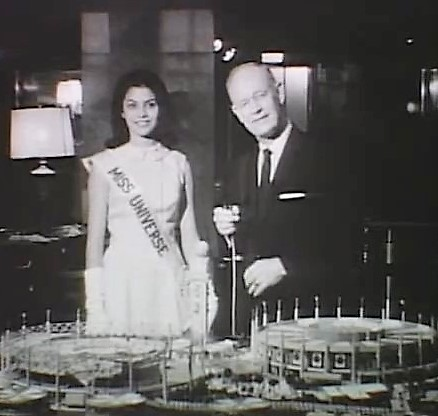
Vargas and Florida governor C. Farris Bryant at 1963 National Governor's Conference.

Iêda Maria Brutto Vargas (December 31, 1944 – December 22, 2025) was a Brazilian actress and beauty queen who was crowned Miss Universe in Miami Beach, Florida in 1963. Previously, she was Miss Brazil and was crowned by Maria Olívia Rebouças. She was the first person from her country to win a major international beauty pageant. Vargas was a native of Rio Grande do Sul. During her term she opened the Capital Plaza Mall in Landover Hills, Maryland, a suburb of Washington, D.C.

Iêda Maria Vargas died in Gramado, Rio Grande do Sul, Brazil on December 22, 2025 at the age of 80.

== See also ==
- Miss Universe 1963
- List of Brazilians

Awards and achievements
Preceded by (Argentina) Norma Nolan	Miss Universe; 1963	Succeeded by (Greece) Corinna Tsopei
Preceded by Maria Olívia Rebouças Cavalcanti	Miss Brasil; 1963	Succeeded by Ângela Teresa Reis Vasconcelos
