= Crystal Hayes =

American actress and model

- Born: Crystal Hayes; September 25, 1984 (age 40); Michigan, U.S.
- Occupation(s): model, actress, image consultant
- Title: Miss Michigan USA 2005

Crystal Hayes (born September 25, 1984) is an American model, beauty pageant titleholder and actress. She was crowned Miss Michigan USA 2005 and competed at Miss USA pageant in Baltimore, Maryland, placing as a semi-finalist in 2005.

== Career ==
After the pageant, Crystal worked as an actress, model, host, and spokesperson for over ten years. She has modeled for brands such as CoverGirl, Maserati, Whirlpool, Lexus, Ford, and Wilhelmina. Crystal's film career began when she was cast as a featured extra by director Michael Bay in 2010.

== Filmography ==
Film and television roles
Year	Title	Role	Notes
2000	Other People's Children	Club singer	
2005	Miss USA 2005	Herself	TV special
2017	Famously Single	Herself	Guest appearance
2017–2019	Veep	Alethia James	Episodes: "Blurb" and "Iowa"
2018	Billion Dollar Buyer	Herself	Guest appearance

Preceded by Stacey Lee	Miss Michigan USA; 2005	Succeeded by Danelle Gay
