= Tanya Wilson =

American beauty pageant titleholder (born 1950)

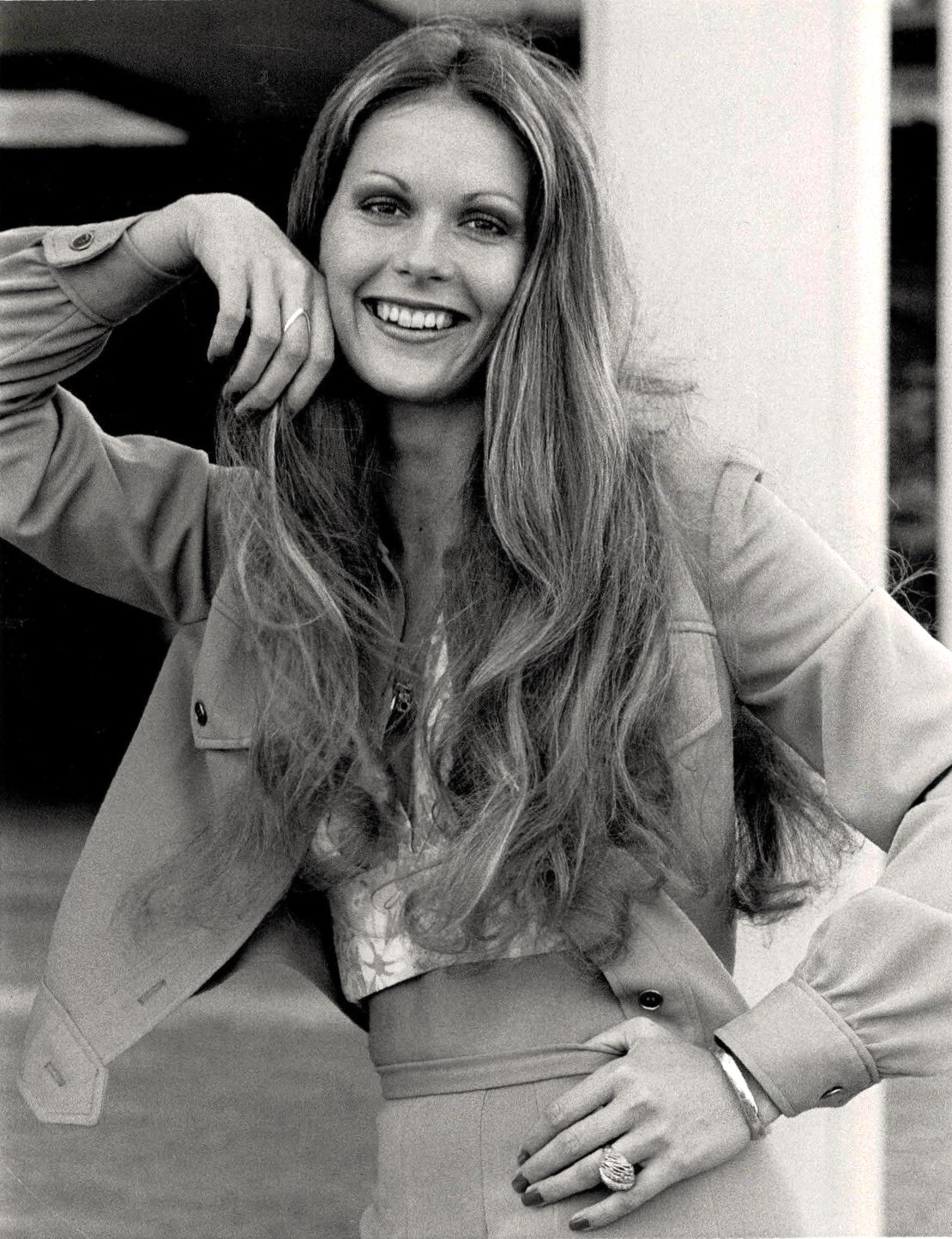
- Wilson in 1973
- Born: Tanya Denise Wilson; June 13, 1950 (age 76); Reno, Nevada, U.S.
- Education: University of Hawaiʻi
- Height: 5 ft 8 in (1.73 m)
- Beauty pageant titleholder
- Title: Miss Hawaii USA 1972; Miss USA 1972
- Hair color: Blonde
- Eye color: Brown
- Major competitions: Miss Hawaii USA 1972; (Winner); Miss USA 1972; (Winner); Miss Universe 1972; (Top 12)

Tanya Denise Wilson (born June 13, 1950) is an American model and beauty pageant titleholder who was crowned Miss USA 1972. Wilson had previously been crowned Miss Hawaii USA 1972, and placed in the top twelve at Miss Universe 1972, where she represented the United States.

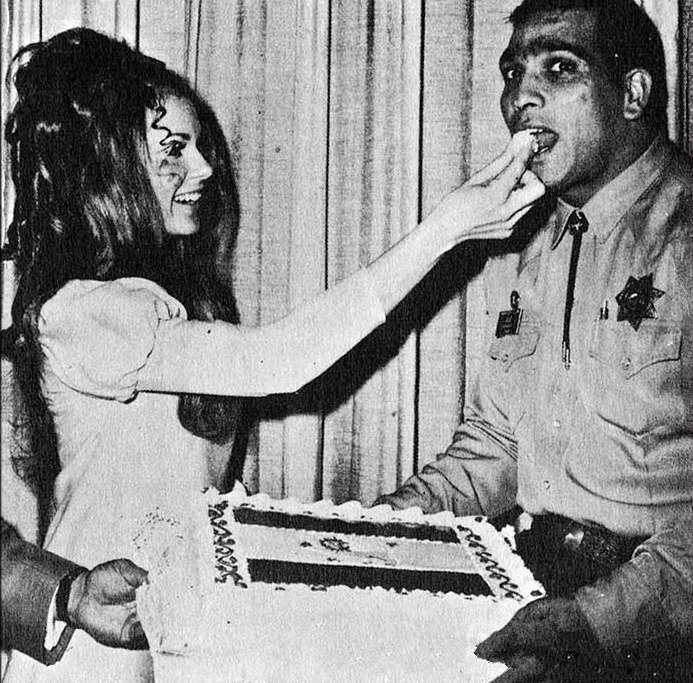
Wilson and Jalal Keshmiri in 1970

Born in Reno, Nevada, Wilson began her pageantry career competing for Miss Nevada in 1969 and 1970, placing as a runner-up. Wilson later moved to Honolulu, Hawaii with her mother and began attending the University of Hawaiʻi. She was later crowned Miss Hawaii USA 1972, earning the right to represent Hawaii at Miss USA 1972 in Dorado, Puerto Rico. She went on to win the title, becoming the second woman from Hawaii to win Miss USA.

As Miss USA, Wilson represented the United States at Miss Universe 1972 in Dorado, where she placed in the top twelve. She finished her reign as Miss USA after crowning Amanda Jones of Illinois as Miss USA 1973.

At the time of her Miss Hawaii USA win, Wilson was a senior at the University of Hawaiʻi studying physical education, and was set to graduate the weekend after Miss USA. She had planned to become engaged to her boyfriend after her graduation, but was forced to defer the engagement after winning the title. She and her fiancé intended to marry in June 1973 after passing on her title.
