= Jill Dobson =

American journalist

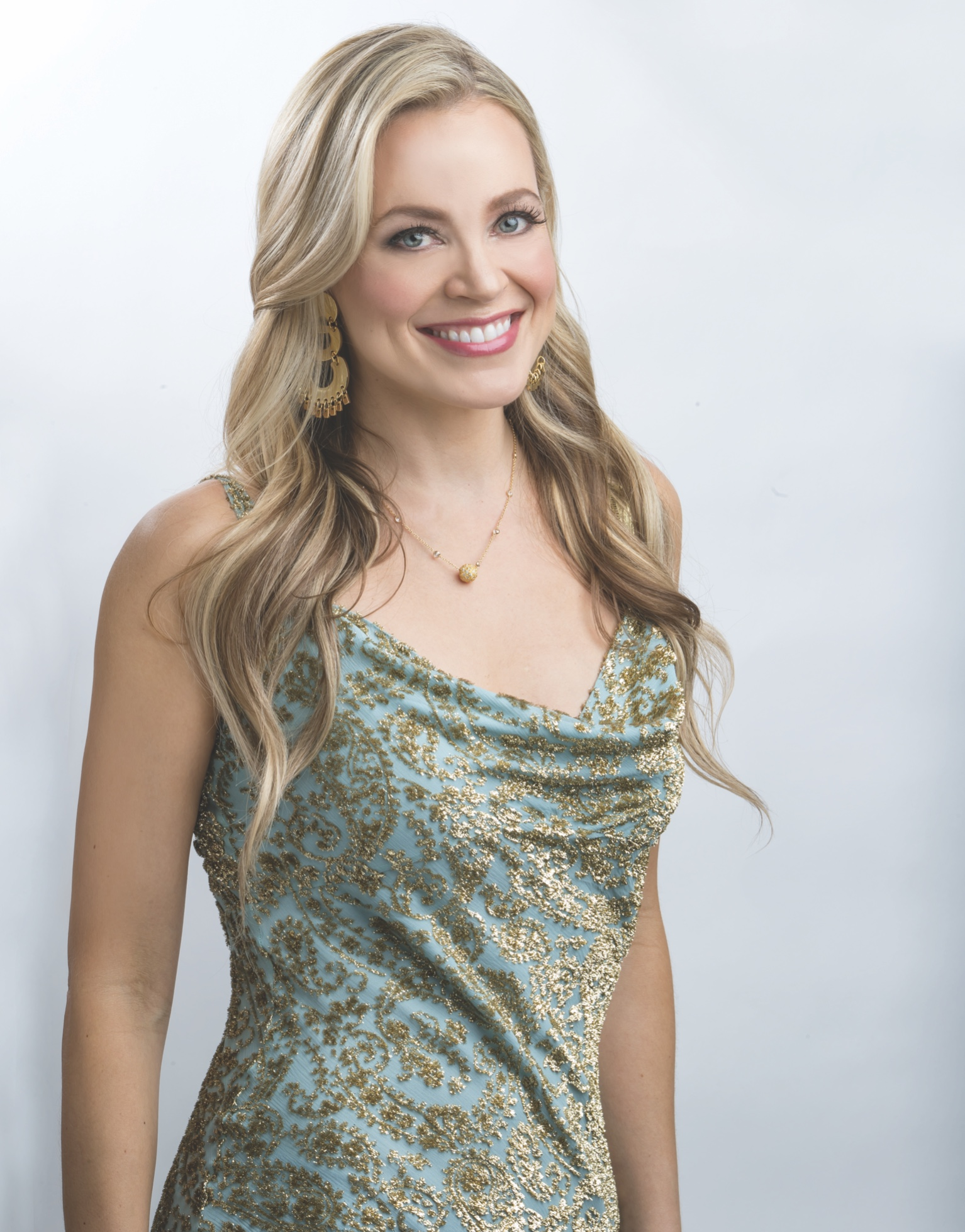
- Dobson in 2018
- Born: Jill Susan Dobson; November 8, 1977 (age 49); Quincy, Michigan, U.S.
- Education: Troy University (BA); Michigan State University (MA)
- Spouse: Jim Ornstein (m. 2006)
- Children: 2
- Beauty pageant titleholder
- Title: Miss Michigan USA 2000
- Hair color: Blonde
- Eye color: Blue
- Major competitions: Miss USA 2000 (Top 10)

Jillian Susan Dobson (born 8 November 1977) is an American journalist and former beauty pageant titleholder. She has been covering entertainment for the Associated Press since early 2016, and is a former contributor for CBS's The Early Show and HLN. She also is a former television entertainment correspondent for the Fox News Channel.

== Biography ==
Dobson received a B.A. in journalism summa cum laude from Troy University in 1998 and an M.A. in journalism from Michigan State University in 2001. After graduation, she interned at Fox News in the Fall of 2001, starting on September 7, 2001 and interviewed rescue workers at Ground Zero in the September 11th attacks on the World Trade Center in 2001.

She won the Miss Michigan USA 2000 title in 1999 and competed in the Miss USA 2000 pageant, where she placed in the top ten.

Dobson began her career at WLNS (CBS) in Lansing, Michigan, where she was a General Assignment Reporter. From June 2002 to 2004 Dobson worked for WWMT Channel 3 in Kalamazoo. In 2004 she moved to New York where she found work as a correspondent, including News 12 Long Island. She was also a freelance reporter for E! News in July 2004. In June 2006, Dobson became News & Style Editor at Large, the television spokesperson, for Star magazine.

Dobson was hired for Fox News in July 2007 as an entertainment correspondent. She was a regular correspondent on Fox's morning show Fox & Friends, as well as Fox News prime time talk programs, including Hannity and Colmes, Hannity, and the O'Reilly Factor, as well as other Fox shows including The Live Desk. She has also covered several red carpet events like the famed Oscars in Los Angeles. After the introduction of the Strategy Room web programing, she hosted the Monday through Friday "Entertainment Hour." On July 16, 2010, Dobson's contract with Fox expired. Dobson cited Fox News's move away from entertainment reporting and the resulting declining amount of screen time as the reason she wanted to leave the network. She continues to be a regular guest-panelist on Fox's late-night satire show Red Eye and guest-hosted the June 18, 2010 episode. Dobson plays entertainment correspondent Madison Daly on the Onion News Network which premiered on January 21, 2011, at 9:00 p.m. CST on IFC.

== Personal ==
Dobson has been married to William Morris agent Jim Ornstein since June 3, 2006. On the June 3, 2011 episode of Red Eye, Dobson announced she was pregnant. In the summer on 2012, she gave birth to a healthy baby girl named Elle and has an 15-year-old boy named Shane.
