= Bobbi Johnson =

American engineer and miss USA winner

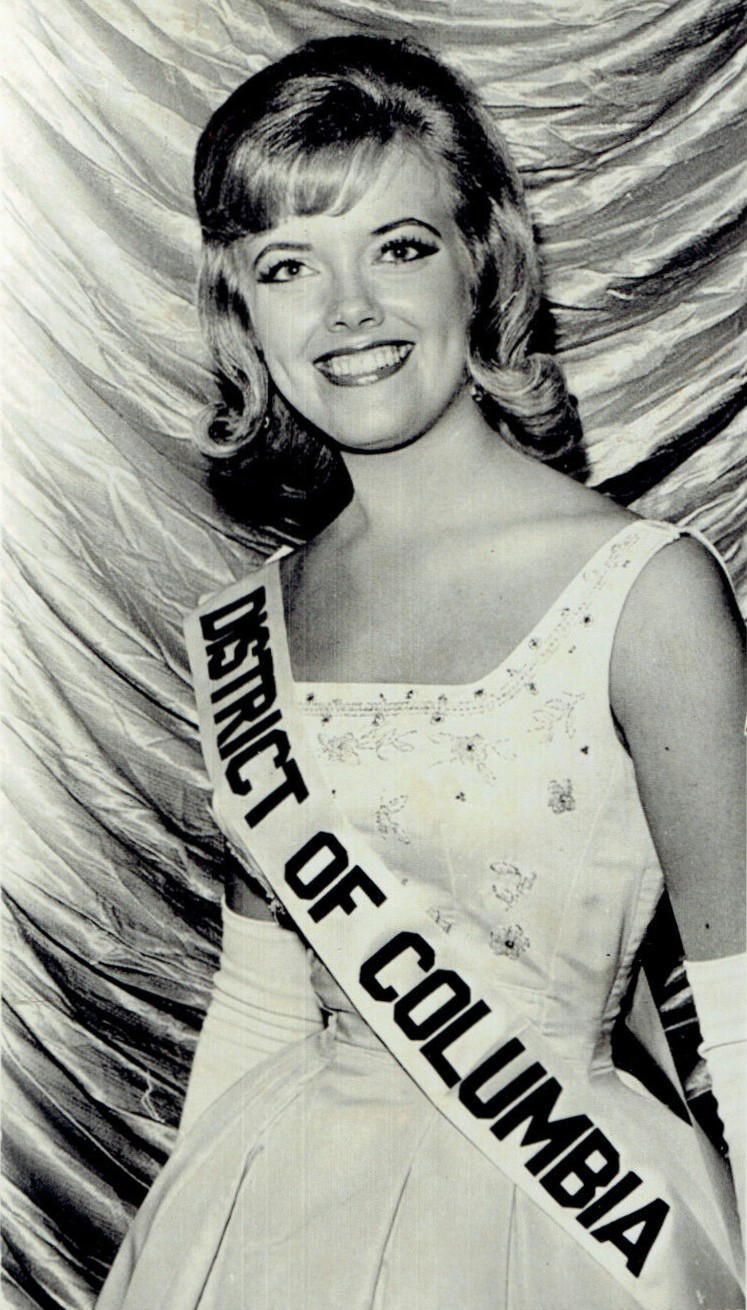
- Johnson, as Miss District of Columbia USA, after Miss USA 1964 semifinals
- Born: March 24, 1945 (age 81); Alexandria, Virginia, U.S.
- Beauty pageant titleholder
- Title: Miss District of Columbia USA 1964; Miss USA 1964
- Major competitions: Miss District of Columbia USA 1964 (Winner); Miss USA 1964 (Winner); Miss Universe 1964 (Top 15)

Barbara Joan "Bobbi" Johnson (born March 24, 1945) is an American former computer application engineer and beauty pageant titleholder who held the Miss USA 1964 title and has competed in the Miss Universe pageant.

After winning the Miss District of Columbia USA crown, Johnson went on to become the first representative from the District of Columbia to achieve the title of Miss USA, at age 19. She would be the only titleholder from the District until Shauntay Hinton won the crown in 2002. Johnson went on to compete in the Miss Universe 1964 pageant, where she made the semi-finals.

Johnson later worked as an applications engineer in the computer department of General Electric to program GE 400-series and DATANET-30 computer systems. She was interviewed about her career choice in the book Your Career in Computer Programming published in 1967. In the book, she explained how after winning her Miss USA title she was asked by reporters what career ambition she had: "I guess they thought I’d say something like modeling or becoming an actress, but I said the first thing that popped into my head: that I wanted to be a computer programmer…". The book also includes side-by-side photographs of her as Miss USA and at her console as an applications engineer a few years later.

Bobbi later returned to school and would graduate magna cum laude from North Central College, receiving a degree in accounting. After passing the Certified Public Accountant exam she worked in tax accounting.
