= Miss USA 1973 =

- Date: May 19, 1973
- Presenters: Bob Barker and Helen O'Connell
- Entertainment: The Lettermen
- Venue: Broadway Theatre, New York City, New York
- Broadcaster: CBS, WCBS-TV
- Entrants: 51
- Placements: 12
- Winner: Amanda Jones; Illinois

Miss USA 1973 was the 22nd Miss USA pageant, televised live by CBS from Broadway Theatre, New York City, New York on May 19, 1973, Hosted by Bob Barker who 8 months earlier began hosting The Price Is Right on CBS.

The pageant was won by Amanda Jones of Illinois, who was crowned by outgoing titleholder Tanya Wilson of Hawaii. Jones was the third woman from Illinois to win the Miss USA title, and went on to place as 1st runner-up to Margarita Moran of the Philippines at Miss Universe 1973.

== Results ==
| Final results | Contestant |
|---|---|
| Miss USA 1973 | Illinois – Amanda Jones |
| 1st Runner-Up | (New York (state)) New York –Susan Carlson |
| 2nd Runner-Up | Rhode Island – Gayle White |
| 3rd Runner-Up | Arizona – Sherry Nix |
| 4th Runner-Up | Maryland –Betty Jo Grove |
| Top 12 | California – Carol Herrema; (Washington, D.C.) District of Columbia – Nancy Paltcha; Florida – Stacy Evans; Kansas – Brenda Kopmeyer; Louisiana – Storm Hensley; Nebraska – Janice Geiler; Texas – Lavon McConnell |

== Delegates ==
The Miss USA 1973 delegates were:

- Alabama – Diane Fouilhe
- Alaska – Wendy Curwen
- Arizona – Sherry Nix
- Arkansas – Christal Phiffer
- California - Carol Herrema
- Colorado – LeNita Mosley
- Connecticut – Wendy Vecchiarino
- Delaware – Linda Graves
- (Washington, D.C.) District of Columbia – Nancy Paltcha
- Florida – Stacy Evans
- (Georgia (U.S. state)) Georgia – Melanie Chapman
- Hawaii – Camille Deubel
- Idaho – Karen Hammond
- Illinois – Amanda Jones
- Indiana – Debbie Ausenbaugh
- Iowa – Dyanne Roberts
- Kansas – Brenda Kopmeyer
- Kentucky – Nancy Jane Coplen
- Louisiana – Storm Hensley
- Maine – Brenda Davis
- Maryland – Betty Jo Grove
- Massachusetts – Judith "Judy" Ann Gregory
- Michigan – Linda East
- Minnesota – Cyndi James
- Mississippi – Karen Clements
- Missouri – Camilla Crist
- Montana – Jeri Joy Shandorf
- Nebraska – Janice Geiler
- Nevada – Laura Fritz
- New Hampshire – Grace Knox
- New Jersey – Patricia Everett
- New Mexico – Carolyn Cline
- (New York (state)) New York – Susan Carlson
- North Carolina – Vivian Anita Craig
- North Dakota – Barbara Lundeen
- Ohio – Jacqueline Urbanek
- Oklahoma – Martha Buchanan
- Oregon – Judy Bishop
- Pennsylvania – Jill Unbewust
- Rhode Island – Gayle White
- South Carolina – Kiki Kirkland
- South Dakota – Becky Bunkers
- Tennessee – Tommye Hooker
- Texas – Lavon McConnell
- Utah – Julia Nebeker
- Vermont – Bonnie Height
- Virginia – Brenda Childress
- (Washington (state)) Washington – Cindi Arnett
- West Virginia – Kathy Rowand
- Wisconsin – Diane Marie Modrow
- Wyoming – Michele Walter

== Judges ==
- Joey Adams - comedian, author
- Joyce Brothers - psychologist, author, TV personality
- Scott Carpenter - U.S. astronaut
- Arlene Dahl - actress
- Joe Frazier - boxer
- Halston - fashion designer
- Peter Max - artist
- Patrick O'Neal - actor
- Maria Remenyi - Miss USA 1966
- Dr. Irwin Maxwell Stillman - dietician
- Jacqueline Susann - actress, author
