= Karen Morrison-Comstock =

American beauty pageant contestant

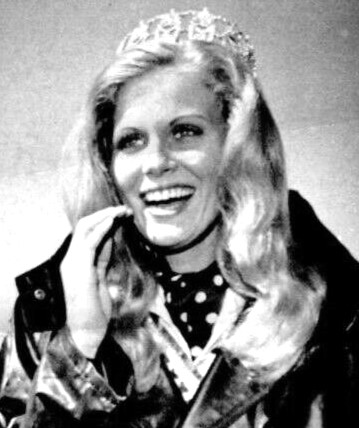
- Morrison in Miss USA 1974 crown
- Born: Karen Jean Morrison; August 4, 1954 (age 72); St. Charles, Illinois U.S.
- Height: 5 ft 11 in (1.80 m)
- Beauty pageant titleholder
- Title: Miss Illinois USA 1974; Miss USA 1974
- Hair color: Blonde
- Eye color: Blue
- Major competition: Miss Illinois USA 1974 (Winner) Miss USA 1974 (Winner) Miss Universe 1974 (Top 12)

Karen Jean Morrison-Comstock (born August 4, 1954) is an American model and beauty pageant titleholder who was crowned Miss USA 1974. She represented her country at Miss Universe 1974 and placed Top 12.

== Pageants ==
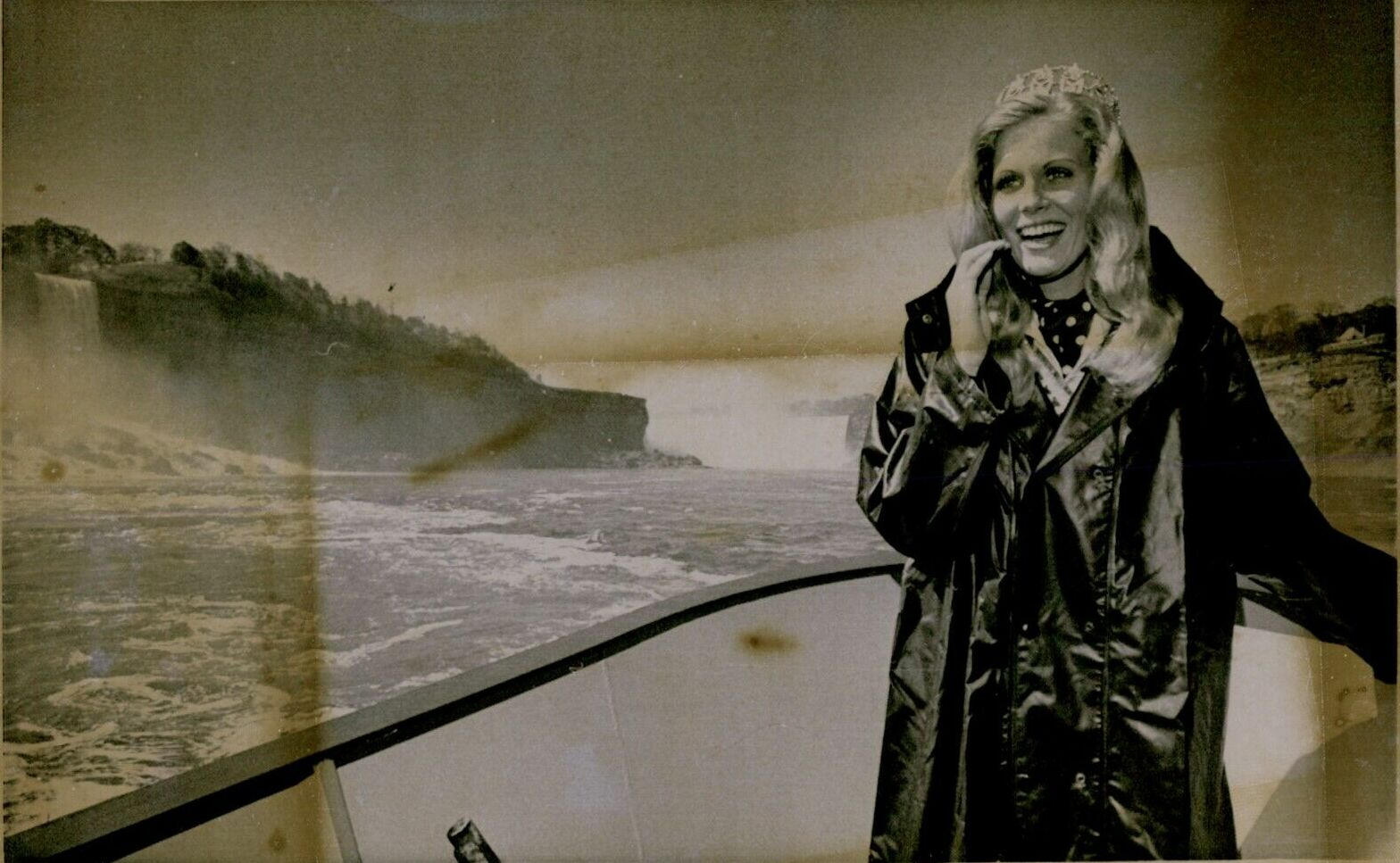
Morrison taking a tour of the Niagara Falls after her victory as Miss USA 1974

Comstock entered the Miss Illinois USA pageant at the suggestion of her modeling agency who owned the franchise and her sister who encouraged her to participate. Paula Zahn, an acquaintance of Comstock also competed and placed in the top five. She won and a month later represented her state in the Miss USA pageant, held in Niagara Falls, New York on May 18, 1974. Comstock won the nationally televised pageant and was crowned by Amanda Jones, also of Illinois. She was crowned in a custom-made white chiffon gown made by Alyce Hamm of Alyce Designs. Her prize winnings included $7,500 cash, a $7,500 appearance contract, $3,000 in scholarships as well as a new car, color television, stereo and clothing. At the time Comstock was one of the tallest contestants ever to win a major beauty pageant.

Comstock represented the United States in the Miss Universe pageant broadcast from Manila in the Philippines two months after winning her national title. This was only the third time that the pageant had been held outside the United States, and the first held in Asia. Continuing the strong history of the United States in this pageant, Comstock placed in the semi-finals. The pageant was won by Amparo Muñoz of Spain.

During her reign she traveled extensively and met celebrities, including Jack Lemmon, Bobby Vinton, Omar Sharif and Joe Namath.

== Personal life ==
Comstock attended Haines Junior High School and St. Charles High School. She was a freshman at the University of Wisconsin when she won the Miss USA title but left to pursue modeling in New York City. In 1976 she returned home to Illinois, embraced fundamentalist Protestant Christianity and toured the United States representing a non-profit organization called Sharing Ministries.

She later married Gordon Comstock and has four children.
