= Miss Michigan USA =

Beauty contest

- Formation: 1952
- Type: Beauty pageant
- Headquarters: Cincinnati
- Location: Ohio
- Members: Miss USA
- Official language: English
- Key people: Melissa Proctor-Pitchford, state pageant director
- Website: Official website

The Miss Michigan USA competition is the pageant that selects the representative for the state of Michigan in the Miss USA pageant. It is currently directed by Proctor Productions.

Their first Miss USA victory was in 1990, and notable because Carole Gist was the first African-American to win the title. Following in her footsteps, Kenya Moore, also African-American, won the title in 1993. In 2010, Michigan's Rima Fakih became the first Arab-American to win the title. The most recent placement was Alma Cooper in 2024, who won the title.

Until 2012, no Michigan delegate had been previously competed at either Miss Michigan or Miss Michigan Teen USA to appear a crossover with Miss USA. Kristen Danyal became the first Michigan delegate to have a Teen to Miss crossover in Miss USA.

Alma Cooper of Okemos was crowned Miss Michigan USA 2024 on March 21, 2024. She represented Michigan at Miss USA 2024, and eventually won the title. She represented the country at Miss Universe 2024 pageant in Mexico but was unplaced.

Amber Uhler of Tampa, FL was appointed Miss Michigan USA 2026 on July 30th, 2026, after the open casting call from Thomas Brodeur, the new owner of the national pageant. She will represent Michigan at Miss USA 2026.

== Gallery of titleholders ==
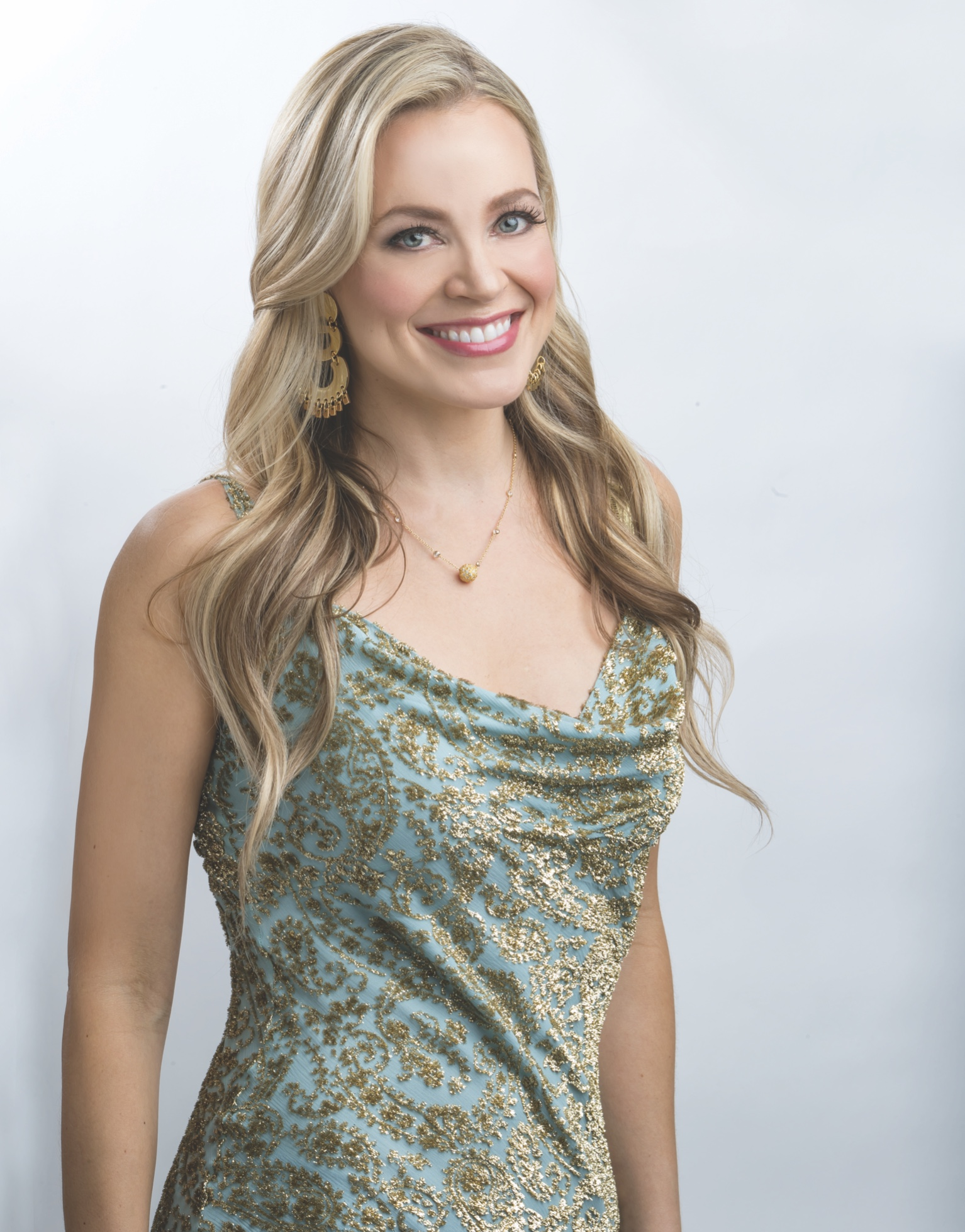
Jillian "Jill" Dobson, Miss Michigan USA 2000

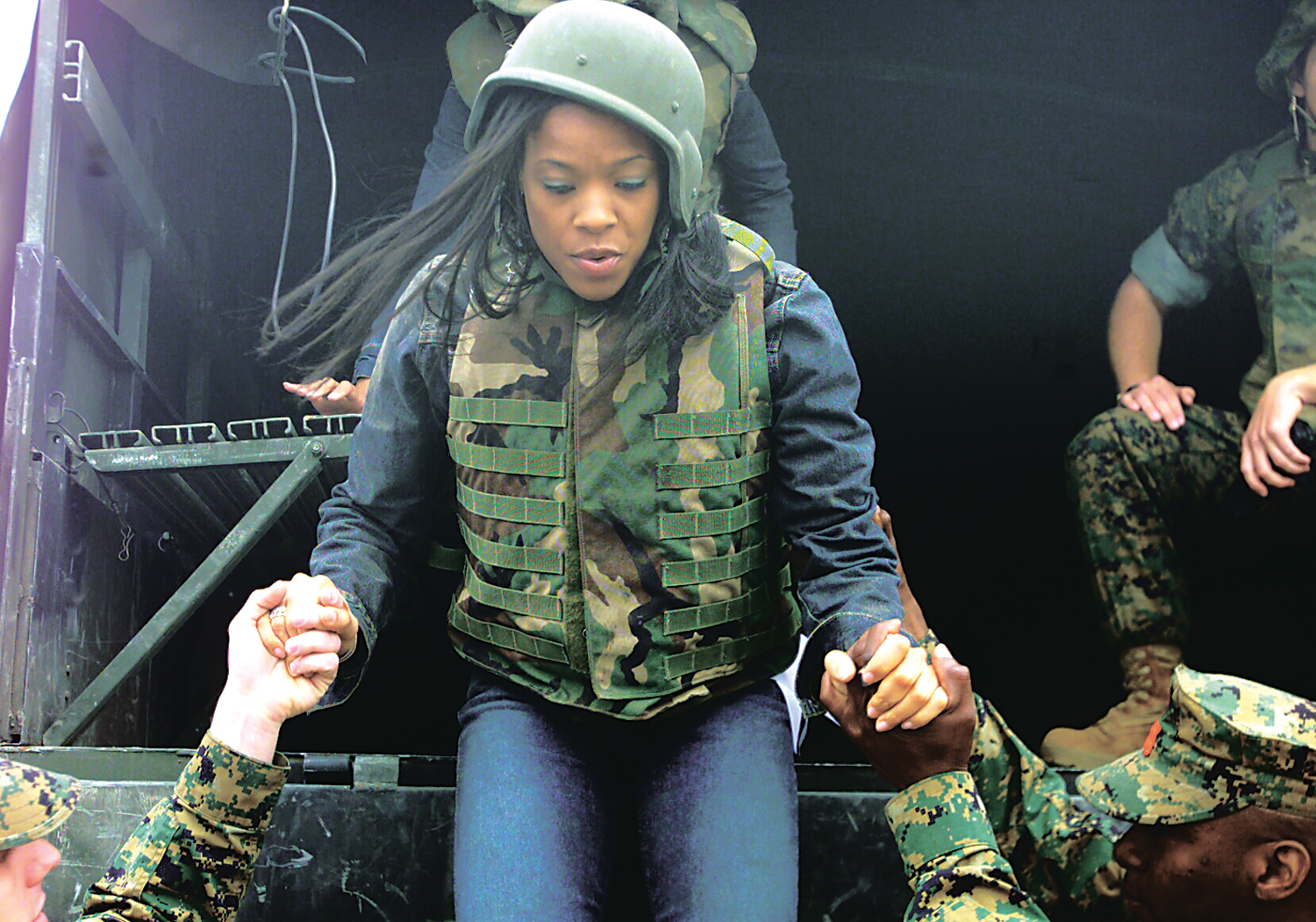
Miss Michigan USA 2004 Stacey Lee was one of a group of Miss USA contestants to take part in a USO tour, visiting U.S. Marine Corps Base Camp Pendleton

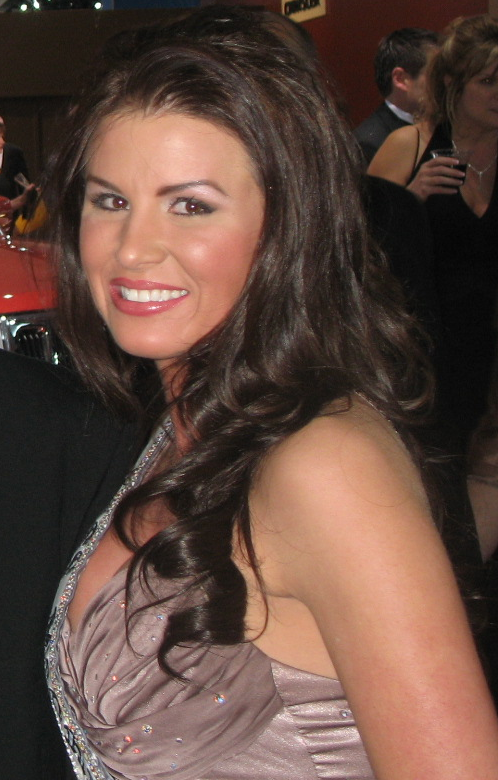
Elisabeth Crawford, Miss Michigan USA 2008

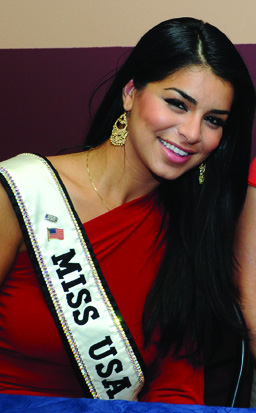
Rima Fakih, Miss Michigan USA 2010 & Miss USA 2010

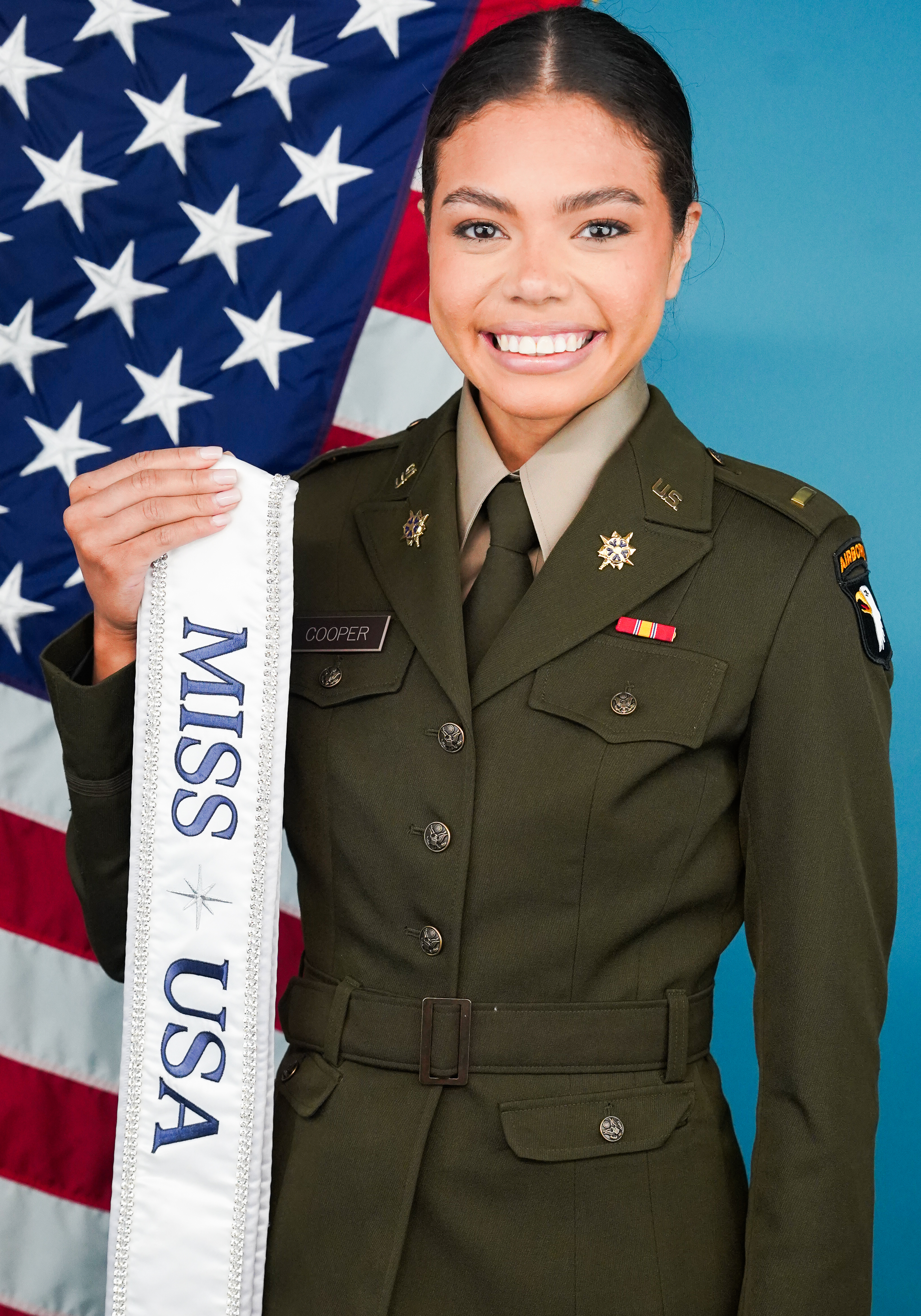
Alma Cooper, Miss Michigan USA 2024 & Miss USA 2024

== Results summary ==
=== Placements in Miss USA ===
- Miss USAs: Carole Gist (1990), Kenya Moore (1993), Rima Fakih (2010), Alma Cooper (2024)
- 1st runner-up: Kevin Gale (1976)
- 3rd runner-up: Elisa Schleef (2003)
- Top 6: Natasha Bell (1996)
- Top 10/11/12: Judy Hatula (1952), Pat Glannon (1971), Marilyn Ann Petty (1972), Diane Arabia (1982), Kimberly Mexicotte (1983), Johnelle Ryan (1998), Shannon Clark (1999), Jillian "Jill" Dobson (2000), Kenya Howard (2001), Rashontae Wawrzyniak (2015)
- Top 15/16: Barbara Sias (1956), Judith Richards (1960), Patricia Squires (1961), Pamela Lee Sands (1963), Susan Pill (1965), Virginia Clift (1968), Crystal Hayes (2005), Kelly Best (2007), Kristen Danyal (2012), Elizabeth Johnson (2018)

Michigan holds a record of 26 placements at Miss USA.

=== Awards ===
- Miss Congeniality: Taylor Hale (2021), Amber Uhler (2026)

== Winners ==
Color key

- Declared as Winner
- Ended as runner-up
- Ended as one of the finalists or semifinalists

Year	Name	Hometown	Age^{1}	Local title	Placement at Miss USA	Special awards at Miss USA	Notes
2026	Amber Uhler	Tampa, FL	41				
2025	Michele Lewandoski	Norton Shores	23	Miss Norton Shores			
2024	Alma Oralia Minerva Cooper	Okemos	22	Miss Okemos	Miss USA 2024		Non-semi-finalist at Miss Universe 2024
2023	Alexis Fagan-Williams	Detroit	22	Miss Motown			
2022	Aria Hutchinson	Plymouth	23	Miss Plymouth			Daughter of Chris Hutchinson and Melissa Sinkevics Hutchinson, Miss Michigan Teen USA 1988; and sister of Detroit Lions defensive end Aidan Hutchinson
2021	Taylor Hale	Detroit	26	Miss Spirit of Detroit		Miss Congeniality	Shortest reigning Miss Michigan USA (9 months and 21 days); Winner of Big Brother 24 and America's Favorite Houseguest.
2020	Chanel Johnson	Southfield	25	Miss Southfield			Longest reigning Miss Michigan USA (1 year, 10 months, and 17 days); Second longest reigning Miss USA state titleholder in the organization's history
2019	Alyse Madej	Garden City	25	Miss Garden City			
2018	Elizabeth Johnson	Plymouth	25	Miss Wayne County	Top 15		
2017	Krista Ferguson	Detroit	23	Miss North Shore Bay			
2016	Susie Leica	Livonia	25	Miss Livonia			
2015	Rashontae Wawrzyniak	Detroit	24	Miss St. Clair Lake	Top 11		
2014	Elizabeth Ivezaj	Macomb	24	Miss Macomb			Born in Albania
2013	Jaclyn Schultz	Wyandotte	24	Miss Wyandotte			Runner-up on Survivor: San Juan del Sur
2012	Kristen Danyal	Sterling Heights	21	Miss Blue Water	Top 16		Previously Miss Michigan Teen USA 2009 and top 15 at Miss Teen USA 2009
2011	Channing Pierce	Royal Oak	23	Miss Royal Oak			
2010	Rima Fakih	Dearborn	24	Miss Wayne County	Miss USA 2010		Born in Lebanon; Non-semi-finalist at Miss Universe 2010
2009	Lindsey Tycholiz	Sterling Heights	26	Miss Great Lakes			
2008	Elisabeth Crawford	Canton	25	Miss East Michigan			
2007	Kelly Best	Troy	20	Miss Troy	Top 15		Later Miss U.S. International 2008; Non-finalist at Miss International 2008
2006	Danelle Gay	Lapeer	24	Miss Lapeer			
2005	Crystal Hayes	Rock	20	Miss Northville	Top 15		
2004	Stacey Lee	Rochester Hills	26	Miss Oakland County			
2003	Elisa Schleef	St. Joseph	23	Miss Great Lakes	3rd runner-up		
2002	Rebekah Lynn Decker	Ferndale	24				
2001	Kenya Howard	Detroit	24		Top 10		
2000	Jillian Susan "Jill" Dobson	Quincy	22		Top 10		Michigan's Junior Miss 1995
1999	Shannon Grace Clark	Troy	26		Top 10		Semi-finalist at Miss World America 1993
1998	Johnelle Ryan	Cassopolis	25		Top 10		
1997	Jennifer Reed	Taylor	25				Later Mrs. Michigan America 2001
1996	Natasha Bell	Berrien Springs	20		Top 6 finalist		
1995	Keisha Eichelberger	Detroit					
1994	Kelly Richelle Pawlowski	Allen Park					
1993	Kenya Summer Moore	Detroit	22		Miss USA 1993		Top 6 at Miss Universe 1993
1992	Lainie Lu Howard	St. Joseph					1st runner-up at Miss World America 1994
1991	Leann Rothi		18				
1990	Carole Anne Marie Gist	Detroit	20		Miss USA 1990		1st runner-up at Miss Universe 1990
1989	Karen Finucan	Birmingham					
1988	Anthonia Dotson	Detroit					
1987	Elizabeth Puleo	Grosse Pointe					
1986	Lisa Bernardi	Carleton					
1985	Nancy Mazuro	Washington					
1984	Adriana Krambeck	Dearborn Heights					
1983	Kimberly Mexicotte	Livonia			Semi-finalist		
1982	Diane Marie Arabia	Warren			Semi-finalist		4th runner-up in Miss Oktoberfest 1981 Previously Miss Michigan World 1980 and Top 15 semi-finalist at Miss World America 1980.
1981	Karen Eidson	Hazel Park					
1980	Teena Hammonds	Detroit					
1979	Susan James	Hazel Park					
1978	April Patrick	Detroit					
1977	Jenny Pinks	Trenton					
1976	Kevin Gale	Dearborn Heights			1st runner-up		
1975	Debra Holland	Detroit					
1974	Patricia Loftis	Detroit					
1973	Linda East	Warren					
1972	Marilyn Ann Petty	Roseville			Semi-finalist		Represented Michigan in Miss World USA 1974, 2nd runner-up
1971	Pat Glannan	Detroit			Semi-finalist		
1970	Duane Marie Bergen	Detroit	19				
1969	Lisa Brenner	Reed City					
1968	Virginia Clift	Novi			Top 15	Top 15 Best in Swimsuit	
1967	Sonja Dunson	Detroit					
1966	Kathlene Blascak	Allen Park					
1965	Susan Lynne Pill				Top 15		represented Michigan in the Miss USA World 1964, 3rd runner up
1964	Johneane Teeter						Represented Michigan in the Miss USA World 1966
1963	Pamela Lee Sands	Ludington			Top 15		
1962	Judith Lamparter						
1961	Patricia Squires				Top 15		
1960	Judith Richards				Top 15		
1959	Susan Westergaard						
1958	Shirley Ann Black	Flint	19				
1957	Sharon Moore						
1956	Barbara Sias				Top 15		
1955	Martha Smith						
1954	Gerri Hoffman						
1953	Jo Ann Page						
1952	Judy Hatula				Top 10		

^{1} Age at the time of the Miss USA pageant
