= Marianne Gaba =

American beauty queen, model, and actress (1939–2016)

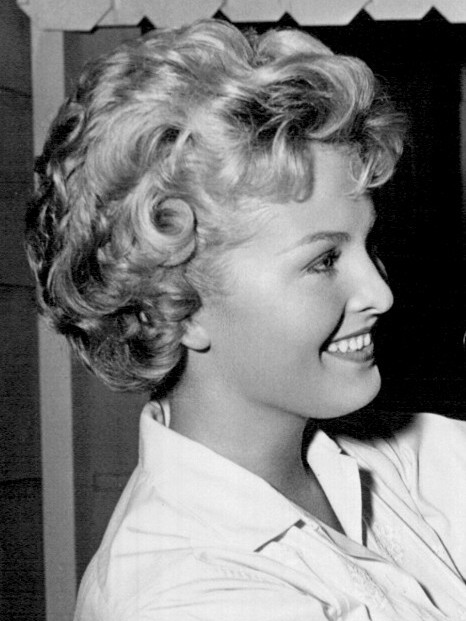
- Gaba as a guest star on 77 Sunset Strip in 1960

Playboy centerfold appearance
- September 1959
- Preceded by: Clayre Peters
- Succeeded by: Elaine Reynolds

Personal details
- Born: November 13, 1939 Chicago, Illinois, U.S.
- Died: May 3, 2016 (aged 76) Los Angeles, California, U.S.
- Height: 5 ft 6 in (1.68 m)

Marianne Gaba (November 13, 1939 – May 3, 2016) was an American actress, model and beauty pageant titleholder who was crowned Miss Illinois USA 1957 and Playboy magazine's Playmate of the Month for its September 1959 issue.

== Personal life and death ==
Gaba was born in Chicago, Illinois. She was fluent in three languages—Bohemian (Czech), Polish, and Spanish—in addition to English.

On June 11, 1960, she married Michael Eugene Starkman in Las Vegas, Nevada. Her son, Gregory C., was born in 1962 and her daughter, Wendy M. was born in 1966.

Gaba died on May 3, 2016, from brain cancer in Los Angeles, California, aged 76.

== Filmography ==
- Dr. Goldfoot and the Bikini Machine (1965) .... Robot
- How to Stuff a Wild Bikini (1965) .... Animal
- The Beverly Hillbillies
  - "Cool School Is Out" (1965) .... Squirrel
  - "Big Daddy, Jed" (1965) .... Squirrel
- Burke's Law - "Who Killed the Fat Cat?" (1965) .... Beautiful Blonde
- The Patsy (1964) (uncredited) .... Waitress
- Island of Love (1963) (uncredited)
- The Choppers (1961) .... Liz
- Checkmate - "The Button-Down Break" (1961) .... Lucille, Devlin's Girl Friend
- 77 Sunset Strip
  - "The Affairs of Adam Gallante" (1960) .... Peaches Schultz
  - "Sing Something Simple" (1959) .... Lita Ladoux
- G.I. Blues (1960) (uncredited) .... Bargirl
- Raymie (1960) .... Second Girl
- Please Don't Eat the Daisies (1960) (uncredited) .... Young Girl
- Mike Hammer (1959) .... Doris' daughter
- Johnny Staccato - "A Piece of Paradise" (1959) .... Gaba Gaba Hey
- Missile to the Moon (1958) .... Moon Girl
- The George Burns and Gracie Allen Show - “Too Much Pot Roast” (1957) ….. Miss Illinois
- You Bet Your Life Contestant (1957)

== See also ==
- List of people in Playboy 1953–1959
- List of Playboy Playmates of 1959

Preceded by Mickey Blair	Miss Illinois USA; 1957	Succeeded by June Pickney

Virginia Gordon	Eleanor Bradley	Audrey Daston	Nancy Crawford	Cindy Fuller	Marilyn Hanold
Yvette Vickers	Clayre Peters	Marianne Gaba	Elaine Reynolds	Donna Lynn	Ellen Stratton
