= Miss USA 1964 =

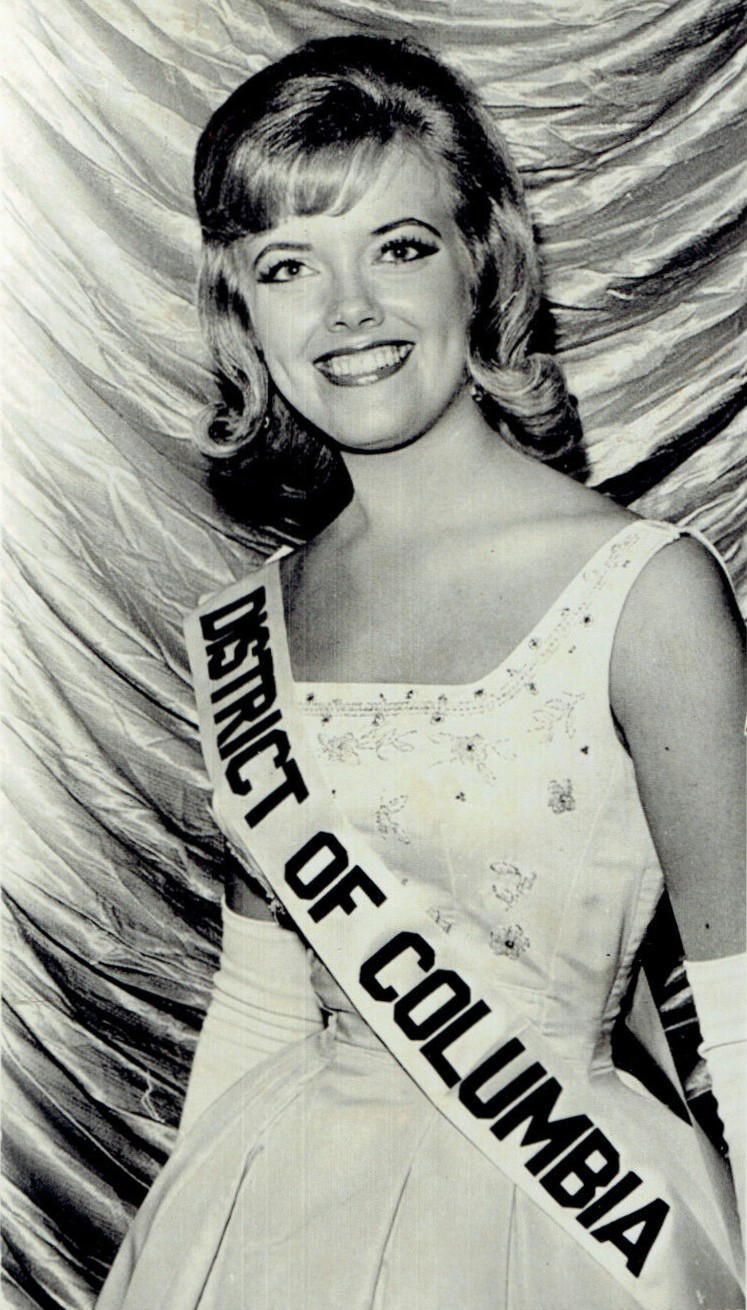
- Bobbi Johnson
- Date: July 29, 1964
- Venue: Miami Beach, Florida
- Broadcaster: CBS, WTVJ
- Entrants: 41
- Placements: 15
- Winner: Bobbi Johnson; District of Columbia
- Congeniality: Jeanne Venables; California
- Best State Costume: Pat Kerr; Tennessee

Miss USA 1964 was the 13th Miss USA pageant, held in Miami Beach, Florida on July 29, 1964. This was the last Miss USA pageant to be held as an inclusive part of the Miss Universe event.

At the end of the event, Marite Ozers of Illinois crowned Bobbi Johnson of the District of Columbia as Miss USA 1964. Johnson was the first woman from Washington D.C. to win the title. Johnson later competed at Miss Universe and was named one of the fifteen semi-finalists.

Contestants from forty-one states and the District of Columbia competed in the pageant.

== Results ==
=== Placements ===
Placement	Contestant
Miss USA 1964	District of Columbia – Bobbi Johnson
1st runner-up	Texas – Diane Balloun
2nd runner-up	Alaska – Susan "Suzy" Marlin
3rd runner-up	Utah – Janet Erickson
4th runner-up	Kentucky - Johnna Reid
Top 15	Alabama – Pamela Borgfeldt; California – Jeanne Venables; Idaho – Dorothy Johnson; Maryland – Royette Tarry; Mississippi – Patricia Turk; New Jersey – Barbara Richartz; New York – Dorothy Langhans; Ohio – Gail Krielow; Oklahoma – Jackie Maloney; Oregon – Toye Esch

== Contestants ==
Forty-one contestants competed for the title.

State/District	Contestant	Age (Note: Ages at the time of the pageant)	Hometown	Notes
Alabama	Pamela Borgfeldt	21	Anniston	
Alaska	Susan "Suzy" Marlin	21	Fairbanks	
Arizona	Diane Reutter	19	Phoenix	
Arkansas	Barbara McGlothlin	20	Little Rock	
California	Jeanne Venables	23	Sacramento	Awarded as Miss Amity at Miss Universe 1964
Connecticut	Patricia Powell	21	Hartford	
Delaware	Christina Klose	20	Wilmington	
District of Columbia	Bobbi Johnson	19	Washington, D.C.	Top 15 at Miss Universe 1964
Florida	Candace Davenport	20	Miami	
Georgia	Lynda Tatum	18	Cave Spring	
Hawaii	Wanda Byrd	18	Honolulu	
Idaho	Dorothy Johnson	18	Pocatello	First African-American to enter the semi-finals
Illinois	Karen Sue Weisbrook	18	Wheaton	
Indiana	Charlene Kratochvil	19	Kokomo	
Iowa	Barbara Rogers	18	Bouton	
Kansas	Barbara Ford	18	Derby	
Kentucky	Johnna Reid	18	Paducah	
Louisiana	Linda Graves	20	Shreveport	
Maine	Corneille Edwards	19	Mechanic Falls	
Maryland	Royette Tarry	19	Baltimore	Later Miss Delaware World 1970
Massachusetts	Barbara Robery		Boston	
Michigan	Johneane Teeter	20	Dearborn	Later Miss Michigan World 1966
Mississippi	Patricia Turk	22		
Missouri	Sandy Bawol		Florissant	4th runner-up at Miss USA World 1963
Nebraska	Georgia Merriam			
Nevada	Pamela Morris		Las Vegas	
New Hampshire	Beverly Hebert			
New Jersey	Barbara Richartz	19	Stratford	
New York	Dorothy Langhans	20	Wantagh	4th runner up at Miss USA World 1965
Ohio	Gail Krielow	20	Richmond Heights	1st runner up at Miss International 1965
Oklahoma	Jackie Maloney	18	Oklahoma City	2nd runner-up at the 1965 Maid of Cotton pageant
Oregon	Toye Esch	20	Salem	
Pennsylvania	Maryann Reilly		Philadelphia	
Rhode Island	Carol Tantimonico		Johnston	
South Carolina	Judy Kennedy			
Tennessee	Pat Kerr	19	Nashville	
Texas	Diane Balloun	19	Houston	
Utah	Janet Erickson	22	Salt Lake City	
Vermont	Freda Betts		Bennington	
Virginia	Heidi Smith		Fort Lee	
Wisconsin	Carolyn Linquist	26	Milwaukee	
