= Marite Ozers =

American model

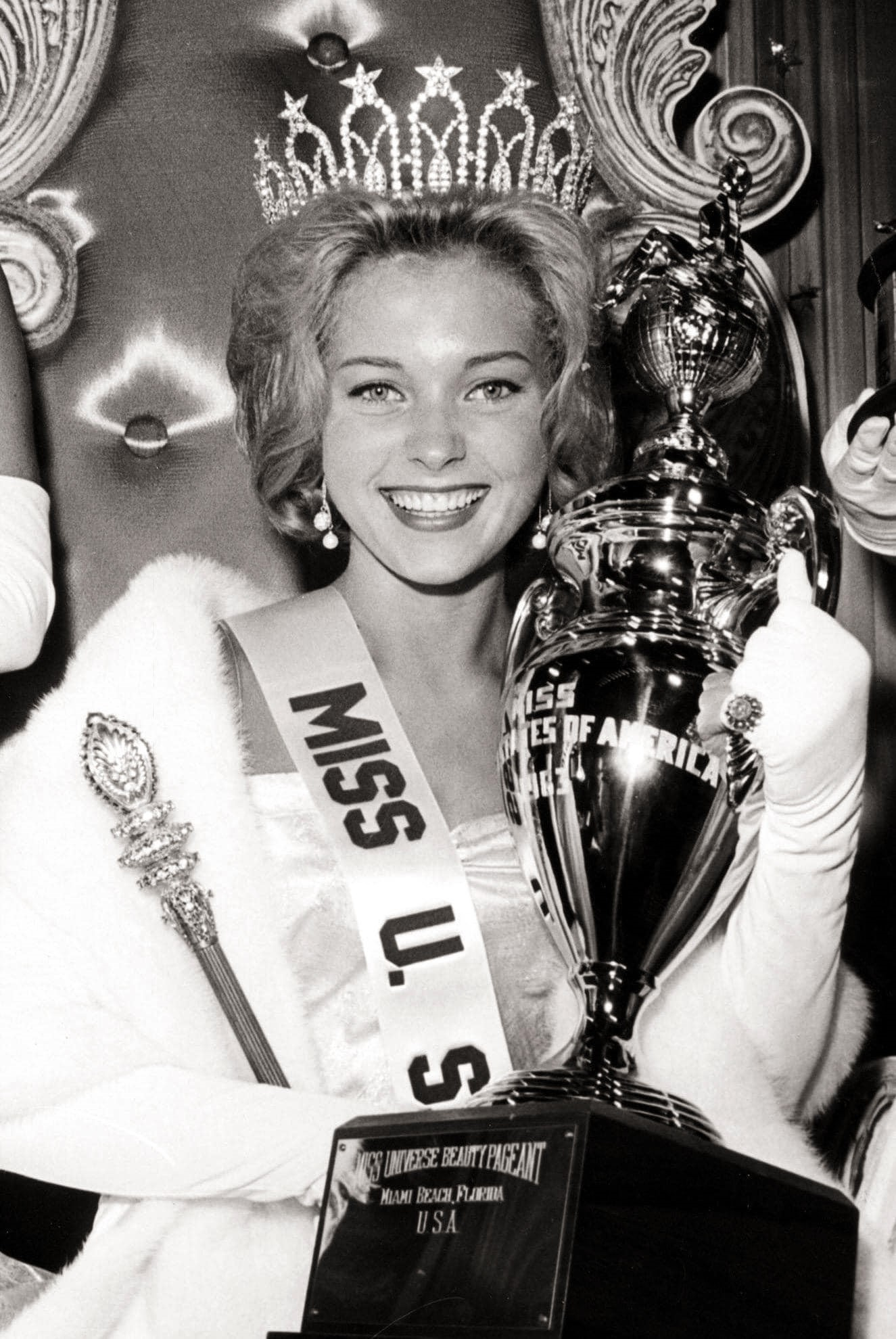
- Ozers as Miss USA 1963
- Born: Mārīte Ozere; April 9, 1944 (age 82); Riga, Latvia
- Beauty pageant titleholder
- Title: Miss Illinois USA 1963; Miss USA 1963
- Hair color: Blonde
- Eye color: Blue
- Major competitions: Miss USA 1963 (Winner); Miss Universe 1963 (Top 15)

Marite Ozers (born Mārīte Ozere; April 9, 1944) is a Latvian American model and beauty pageant titleholder who was crowned Miss USA 1963.

Ozers was born in Riga, Latvia and immigrated with her family to Chicago as refugees amidst World War II. Her father was Maksis Ozers, while she had an elder sister Spulga, elder brother Alnis, and six younger siblings. Ozers began competing in pageantry in order to earn money for university, later winning Miss Illinois USA 1963. As Miss Illinois USA, she was crowned Miss USA 1963, becoming the first naturalized citizen to win the title. She later represented the United States at Miss Universe 1963, where she placed in the Top 15.

In a 2011 interview, Ozers revealed that she had initially planned to compete in Miss America, but felt discouraged from doing so due to her naturalized status and Latvian origin. She instead opted to compete for Miss USA because of its connection to Miss Universe, where she felt a candidate with an international background would be more easily accepted.
