= Amanda Jones (Miss USA) =

American model

Amanda Clara Jones
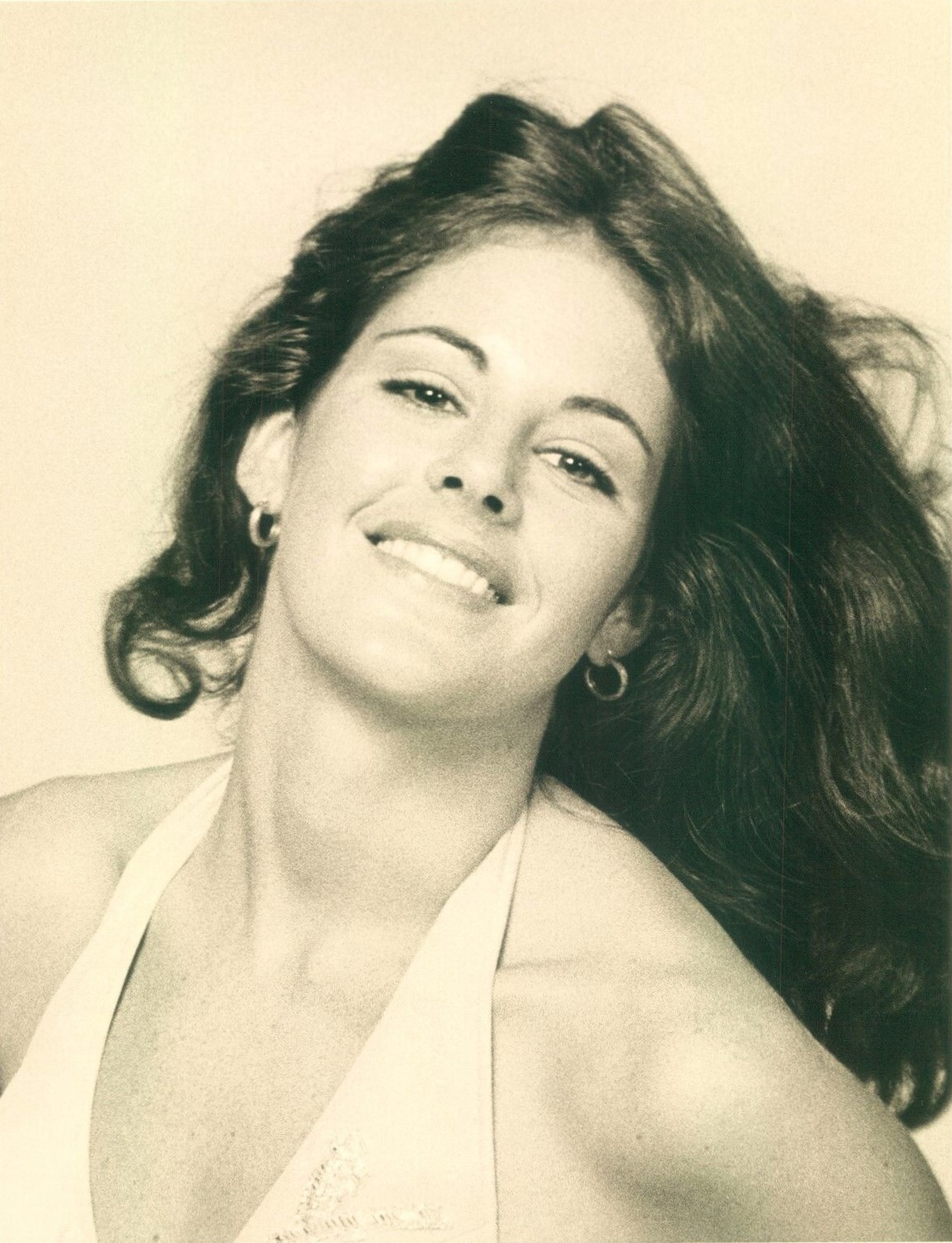
- Jones in 1974
- Born: Amanda Clara Jones; October 28, 1950 (age 75); Evanston, Illinois U.S.
- Height: 5 ft 8 in (1.73 m)
- Beauty pageant titleholder
- Title: Miss Illinois USA 1973 Miss USA 1973
- Hair color: Brown
- Eye color: Brown (right lighter)
- Major competitions: Miss Illinois USA 1973; (Winner); Miss USA 1973; (Winner); Miss Universe 1973; (1st Runner-Up)

Amanda Clara Jones (born October 28, 1950) is an American actress, former model and beauty pageant titleholder who won Miss USA 1973 and then represented the United States at Miss Universe 1973 where she placed 1st Runner-Up.

With no prior pageant experience, Jones was crowned Miss Illinois USA 1973, earning the right to represent Illinois in the Miss USA 1973 pageant held in New York City. She eventually won the Miss USA title and was crowned by outgoing titleholder Tanya Wilson. Her prize money included a $7,500 cash prize and a $7,500 appearance contract. She was the third of four delegates from Illinois to win the Miss USA title. She wore a custom designed white chiffon dress designed by Alyce Hamm of Alyce Designs. The year following her win she crowned fellow Illinois' titleholder Karen Morrison as the new Miss USA, only the second time that a state had won consecutive titles.

In July, Jones competed in the Miss Universe 1973 pageant in Athens, Greece where she placed 1st runner-up to Margarita Moran of the Philippines.

Jones was an aspiring local commercial model, and only applied for the Miss Illinois USA pageant at the behest of her modelling agent. Despite her attempts to get out of this pageant, Jones not only competed but won. As Miss Illinois, she again was reluctant to compete in the Miss USA pageant, which she also won. Jones took on her responsibilities on her terms. Unlike previous titleholders, Jones was an outspoken supporter of Women's Lib and had marched in peace rallies. She declared she was pro-choice on abortion and against the Vietnam War.

She appears under a pseudonym in Studs Terkel's 1980 book American Dreams: Lost & Found where she recalled

One of the big execs from General Motors asked me to do a speech in Washington, D. C., on the consumer and the energy crisis. It was the fiftieth anniversary of the National Management Association. The White House, for some reason, sent me some stuff on it. I read it over, it was nonsense. So I stood up and said: "The reason we have an energy crisis is because we are, industrially and personally, pigs." Oh, they weren't real pleased.... Several times during my year as what's-her-face I had seen the movie The Sting. There's a gesture the characters use which means the con is on: they rub their nose. In my last fleeting moments as Miss USA, as they were playing that silly farewell speech and I walked down the aisle and stood by the throne, I looked right into the camera and rubbed my fingers across my nose. The next day, the pageant people spent all their time telling people that I hadn't done it....

Jones studied at the University of Colorado but dropped out in 1971 to pursue an acting career.
