= Miss USA 1972 =

21st Miss USA pageant

- Date: May 20, 1972
- Presenters: Bob Barker; Helen O'Connell
- Entertainment: Everly Brothers
- Venue: Cerromar Beach Hotel, Dorado, Puerto Rico
- Broadcaster: CBS
- Entrants: 51
- Placements: 12
- Winner: Tanya Wilson; Hawaii
- Congeniality: Peggy Moore; Utah
- Photogenic: Susan Peters; Texas

Miss USA 1972 was the 21st Miss USA pageant, held at Cerromar Beach Hotel in Dorado, Puerto Rico, on May 20, 1972. Tanya Wilson of Hawaii was crowned by outgoing titleholder Michele McDonald of Pennsylvania. This was the second time Hawaii has won the pageant.

Bob Barker (who later that year would begin a 35-year run as host of The Price Is Right on CBS) and singer Helen O'Connell hosted the pageant and the Everly Brothers were the guest entertainers.

Prior to the final competition contestants participated in a number of public appearances, including an official parade held in Ponce and a televised ceremony with Governor Luis Ferre.

This was the first time the pageant was held outside the continental United States. The event was marred by two bomb blasts at the hotel during the pageant, thought to have been caused by anti-American activists. There was severe property damage but no injuries were reported. Earlier that day the venue had been picketed by the Puerto Rican Socialist Party.

== Results ==
Final results	Contestant
Miss USA 1972	Hawaii – Tanya Wilson
1st Runner-Up	(New York (state)) New York – Alberta Phillips
2nd Runner-Up	California – Kim Christina Hobson
3rd Runner-Up	Florida – Coni Ensor
4th Runner-Up	Ohio – Kathleen Kehlmier
Top 12	Alaska – Patricia Lane; (Washington, D.C.) District of Columbia – Janet Gail Greenawalt; Louisiana – Bonnie Martin; Michigan – Marilyn Ann Petty; New Mexico – Donna Reel; North Carolina – Deborah Falls; South Carolina – Susan Gordon

== Special awards ==
Award	Contestant(s)
Miss Amity (Congeniality)	Utah – Peggy Moore
Miss Pixable (Photogenic)	Texas – Susan Peters
Best State Costume	Alaska – Patricia Lane
Miss Hospitality	Deloris Cantu

== Delegates ==
The Miss USA 1972 delegates were:

- Alabama – Elaine Barnhill
- Alaska – Patricia Lane
- Arizona – Marcia Banks
- Arkansas – Susan Tichenor
- California - Kim Christina Hobson
- Colorado – Patricia Cadigan
- Connecticut – Diane Stevens
- Delaware – Michele Voyer
- (Washington, D.C.) District of Columbia – Janet Gail Greenawalt
- Florida – Coni Ensor
- (Georgia (U.S. state)) Georgia – Kaye Ayers
- Hawaii – Tanya Wilson
- Idaho – Lianne Fulmer
- Illinois – Jani Hall
- Indiana – Julie Clifford
- Iowa – Jennifer Jo Owen
- Kansas – Mona Guesnier
- Kentucky – Tamara Branstetter
- Louisiana – Bonnie Martin
- Maine – Cynthia Luce
- Maryland – Patty Townsend
- Massachusetts – Dale Carder
- Michigan – Marilyn Ann Petty
- Minnesota – Darlene Koskiniemi
- Mississippi – Debbie Pawlik
- Missouri – Janet Potter
- Montana – Mitriann Popovich
- Nebraska – Theresa Engels
- Nevada – Tracey Whitney
- New Hampshire – Cathy Davis
- New Jersey – Leila DeSantis
- New Mexico – Donna Reel
- (New York (state)) New York – Alberta Phillips
- North Carolina – Deborah Falls
- North Dakota – Gail Schmeichel
- Ohio – Kathleen Kehlmier
- Oklahoma – Pam Vennerberg
- Oregon – Yvonne Philes
- Pennsylvania – Jeanie Zadrozny
- Rhode Island – Jeanne LeMay
- South Carolina – Susan Gordon
- South Dakota – Kathy Baky
- Tennessee – Linda Thompson
- Texas – Susan Peters
- Utah – Peggy Moore
- Vermont – Stacey Becker
- Virginia – Diane Elizabeth "Dede" Moore
- (Washington (state)) Washington – Connie Ambrose
- West Virginia – Diane McCutcheon
- Wisconsin – Suzan Nass
- Wyoming – Tamara Tulley

== Judges ==
A panel of 11 celebrities was chosen to judge the competition.

- Cindy Adams - broadcaster and columnist
- Cleveland Amory - author, critic, President of the Fund for Animals
- Connie Francis - singer
- Walt Frazier - New York Knicks basketball player
- Halston - designer
- Dong Kingman - artist
- William Knight - Senior Vice-President for Avis Rent a Car System
- Bob Lardine - feature writer for New York Sunday News
- Rita Moreno - Puerto Rican actress
- Ed Sullivan - entertainer
- Jacqueline Susann - author

== See also ==
- Miss Universe 1972
