= Miss Universe 1963 =

12th Miss Universe pageant

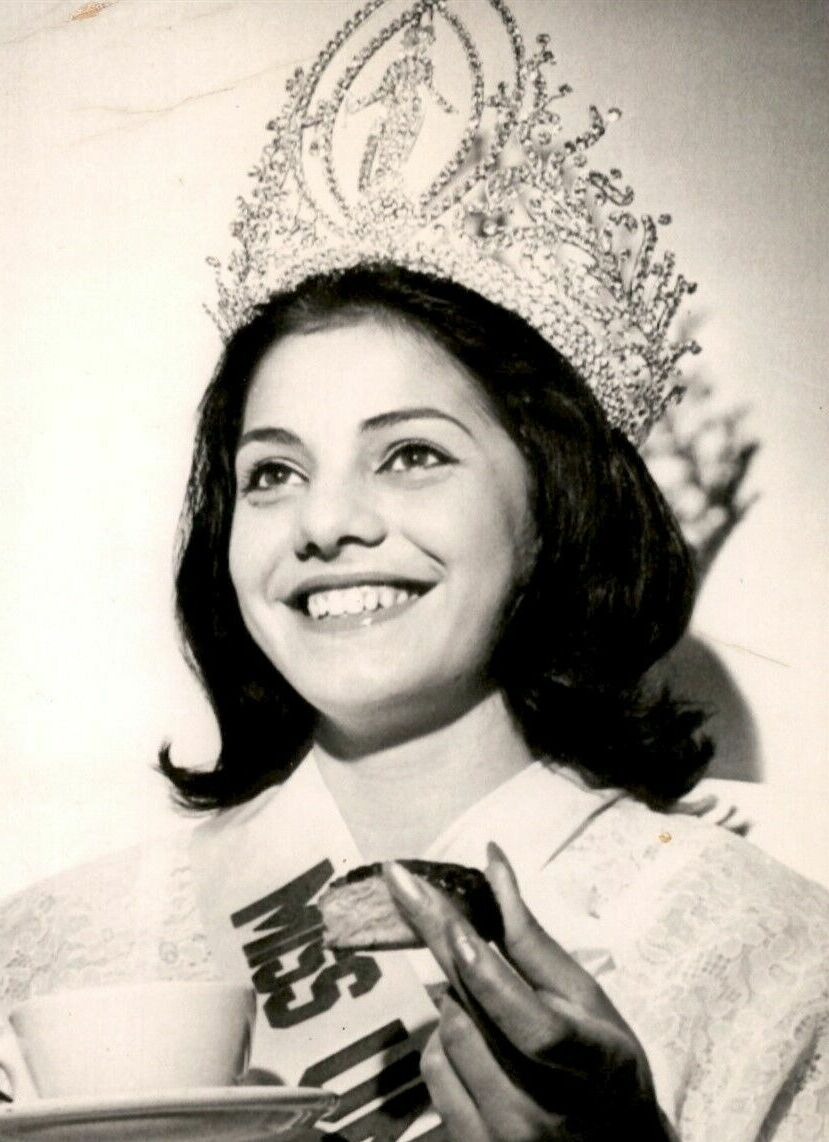
- Iêda Maria Vargas
- Date: 20 July 1963
- Hosts: John Charles Daly; Arlene Francis; Gene Rayburn
- Venue: Miami Beach Auditorium, Miami Beach, Florida, United States
- Broadcaster: CBS
- Entrants: 50
- Placements: 15
- Debuts: Bahamas; Curaçao; Okinawa; Trinidad and Tobago
- Withdrawals: Dahomey; England; Haiti; Hong Kong; Lebanon; Malaya; Portugal; Republic of China; Singapore; Tahiti; United States Virgin Islands
- Returns: British Guiana; Denmark; Jamaica; Nicaragua; Suriname
- Winner: Iêda Maria Vargas; Brazil
- Congeniality: Grace Taylor (Scotland)
- Best National Costume: Sherin Ibrahim (Israel)
- Photogenic: Marlene McKeown (Ireland)

Miss Universe 1963 was the 12th Miss Universe pageant, held at the Miami Beach Auditorium in Miami Beach, Florida, on 20 July 1963.

At the end of the event, Norma Nolan of Argentina crowned Iêda Maria Vargas of Brazil as Miss Universe 1963. It is the first victory of Brazil in the history of the pageant.

Contestants from fifty countries and territories competed in this edition. The pageant was hosted by John Charles Daly, while Arlene Francis and Gene Rayburn served as backstage correspondents.

== Background ==
=== Selection of participants ===
Contestants from fifty countries and territories were selected to compete in the pageant. Two candidates were appointed to represent their countries after being a runner-up at their respective national pageants, while one candidate was appointed to represent her country to replace the original dethroned winner.

==== Replacements ====
Maureen Thomas, first runner-up of Miss Wales 1963, was appointed to represent Wales because Miss Wales 1963 Pat Finch was not "Welsh enough" according to pageant organizers. Miss Turkey 1963, Gülseren Esen Kocaman, did not participate for unknown reasons, she was replaced by Miss Turkey 1961, Güler Samuray.

==== Debuts, returns, and withdrawals ====
This edition saw the debuts of The Bahamas, Curaçao, Okinawa, and Trinidad and Tobago, and the returns of Nicaragua, which last competed in 1955; the British Guiana in 1958; Suriname in 1960; and Denmark and Suriname last competed in 1961.

Francine Marcos of Dahomey withdrew after arriving late to the competition. Susan Pratt of England on the other hand, withdrew after being involved in a car accident which left her with a broken leg.

Nik Azizah Yahya of Malaya withdrew after not reaching the minimum age requirement. Yen-Ping Cheung of Hong Kong, Mona Slim of Lebanon, Maria Penedo of Portugal, and Noela Bernardino of Tahiti withdrew for undisclosed reasons. Haiti, the Republic of China, Singapore, and the United States Virgin Islands withdrew after their respective organizations failed to hold a national competition or appoint a delegate.

Beatriz Martínez of Mexico was supposed to compete but withdrew after not reaching the minimum age requirement. Enid Marugg of Aruba, Hazel Eastmond of Barbados, Yun-Hiu Ying of Macau, Ana Cecilia Maruri of Panama, and Ruby Thelma Bacot of the Panama Canal Zone were all set to compete, but withdrew for undisclosed reasons.

== Results ==
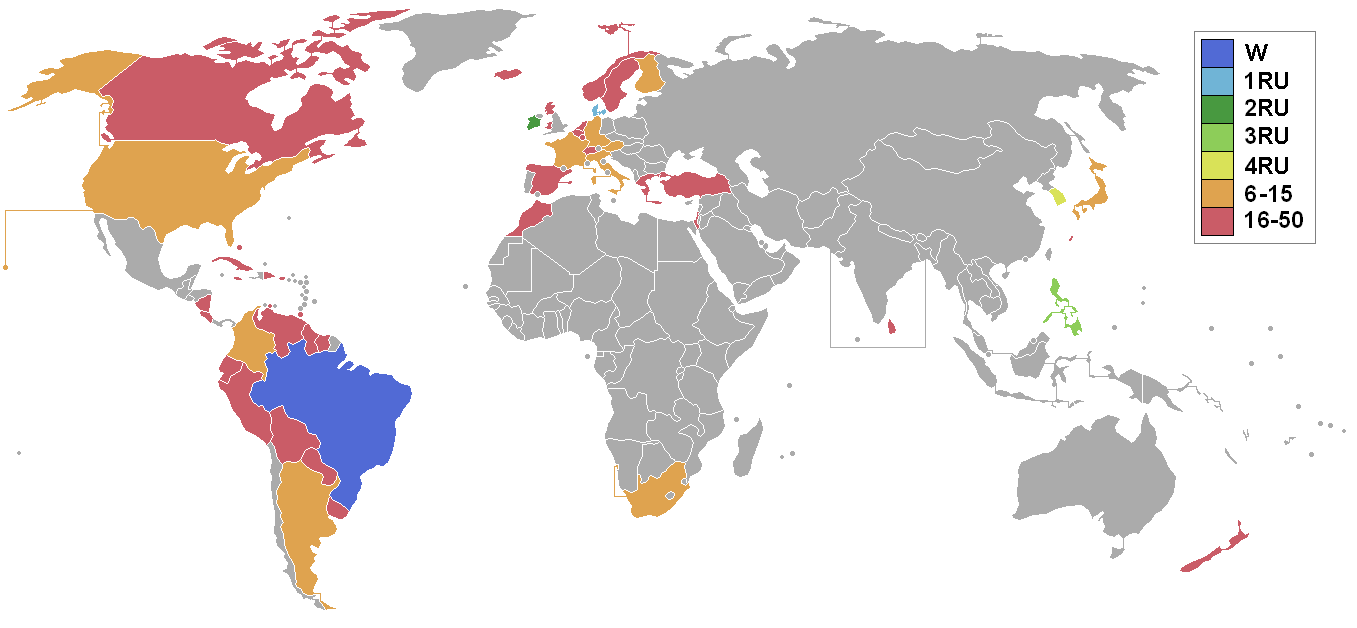
Miss Universe 1963 participating countries and territories

=== Placements ===
Placement	Contestant
Miss Universe 1963	Brazil – Iêda Maria Vargas
1st Runner-Up	Denmark – Aino Korva
2nd Runner-Up	Ireland – Marlene McKeown
3rd Runner-Up	Philippines – Lalaine Bennett
4th Runner-Up	South Korea – Myoung-ja Kim
Top 15	Argentina – Olga Galuzzi; Austria – Gertrude Bergner; Colombia – María Cristina Álvarez; Finland – Riitta Kautiainen; France – Monique Lemaire; Italy – Gianna Serra; Japan – Noriko Ando; South Africa – Ellen Liebenberg; United States – Marite Ozers; West Germany – Helga Ziesemer

=== Special awards ===
Award	Contestant
Miss Amity	Scotland – Grace Taylor
Miss Photogenic	Ireland – Marlene McKeown
Best National Costume	Israel – Sherin Ibrahim

== Pageant ==
=== Format ===
Same with 1955, fifteen semi-finalists were chosen at the preliminary competition that consists of the swimsuit and evening gown competition. Each of the fifteen semi-finalists gave a short speech during the final telecast using their native languages. Afterwards, the fifteen semi-finalists paraded again in their swimsuits and evening gowns, and the five finalists were eventually chosen.

== Contestants ==
Fifty contestants competed for the title.

Country/Territory	Contestant	Age (Note: Ages at the time of the pageant)	Hometown
Argentina	Olga Galuzzi	23	Buenos Aires
Austria	Gertrude Bergner	19	Vienna
Bahamas	Sandra Young	19	Nassau
Belgium	Irene Godin	19	Liège
Bolivia	Ana María Velasco	21	Santa Cruz de la Sierra
Brazil	Iêda Maria Vargas	18	Porto Alegre
British Guiana	Desiree Blackman	19	Georgetown
Canada	Jane Kmita	24	Regina
Ceylon	Manel de Silva	24	Kandy
Colombia	María Cristina Álvarez	18	Bogotá
Costa Rica	Sandra Morúa	18	San José
Cuba	Alicia Chía	19	Havana
Curaçao	Philomena Zielinski	18	Willemstad
Denmark	Aino Korva	20	Copenhagen
Dominican Republic	Carmen Abinader	19	Santiago de los Caballeros
Ecuador	Patricia Córdova	19	Quito
Finland	Riitta Kautiainen	18	Helsinki
France	Monique Lemaire	18	Paris
Greece	Despina Orgeta	20	Athens
Holland	Else Onstenk	21	Arnhem
Iceland	Theódóra Þórðardóttir	18	Reykjanesbær
Ireland	Marlene McKeown	18	Belfast
Israel	Sherin Ibrahim	19	Tel Aviv
Italy	Gianna Serra	19	Rome
Jamaica	June Maxine Bowman	20	Kingston
Japan	Noriko Ando	23	Tokyo
Luxembourg	Mia Dahm	23	Mertert
Morocco	Selma Rahal	20	Casablanca
New Zealand	Regina Scandrett	18	Christchurch
Nicaragua	Leda Sánchez	20	Carazo
Norway	Eva Carlberg	20	Oslo
Okinawa	Reiko Uehara	25	Okinawa
Paraguay	Amelia Benítez	18	Asunción
Peru	Dora Toledano	18	Iquitos
Philippines	Lalaine Bennett	19	Quezon City
Puerto Rico	Jeanette Biascoechea	18	San Juan
Scotland	Grace Taylor	20	Motherwell
South Africa	Ellen Liebenberg	20	Cape Town
South Korea	Myoung-ja Kim	20	Seoul
Spain	María Rosa Pérez	18	Santa Cruz de Tenerife
Suriname	Brigida Hagens	18	Paramaribo
Sweden	Kerstin Jonsson	21	Stockholm
Switzerland	Diane Tanner	25	Geneva
Trinidad and Tobago	Jean Stoddart	18	San Fernando
Turkey	Güler Samuray	22	Istanbul
United States	Marite Ozers	19	Chicago
Uruguay	Graciela Pintos	–	Montevideo
Venezuela	Irene Morales	18	Achaguas
Wales	Maureen Thomas	22	Pontypool
West Germany	Helga Ziesemer	19	Nuremberg
