= Miss Universe 1961 =

10th Miss Universe pageant

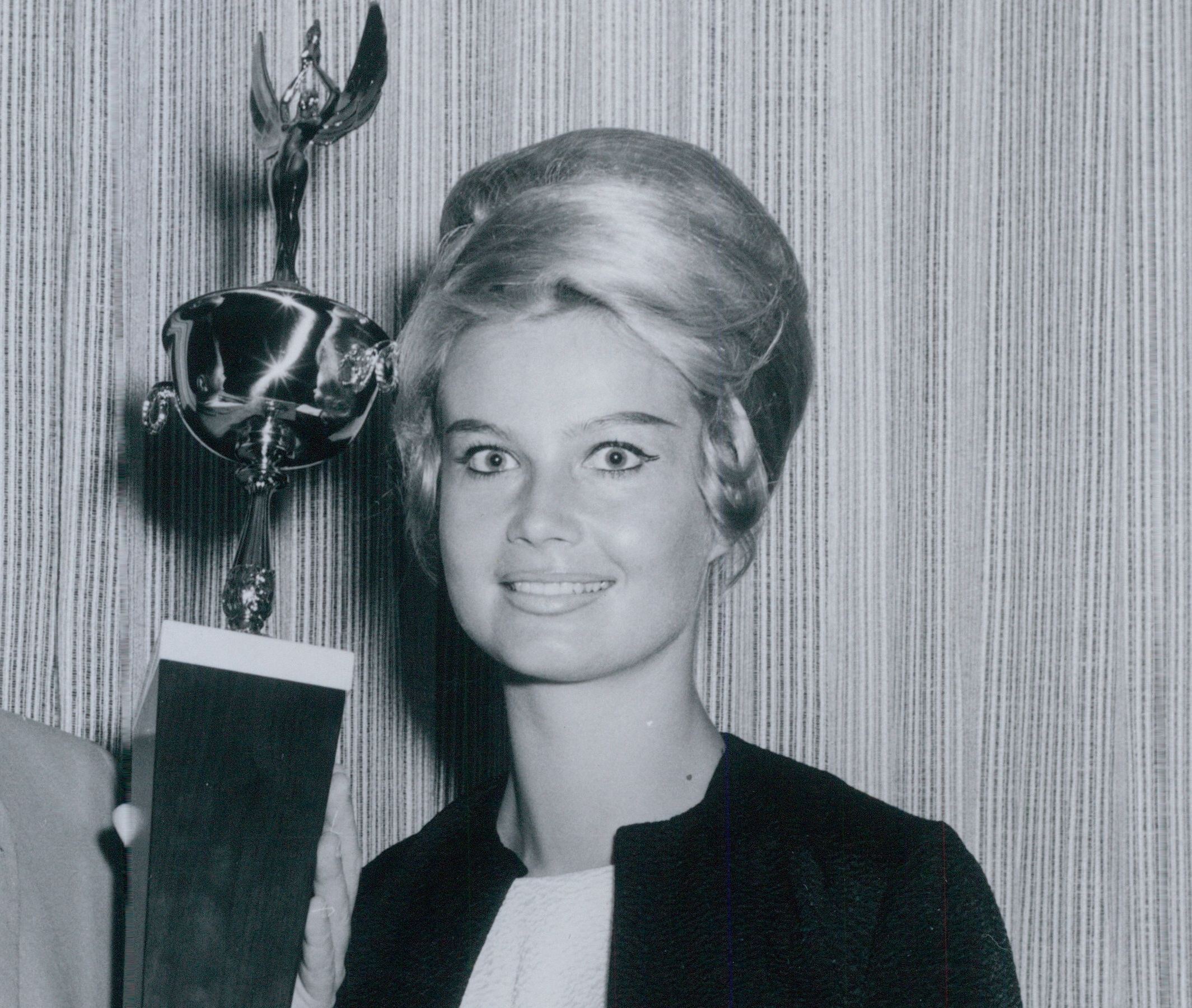
- Marlene Schmidt
- Date: 15 July 1961
- Presenters: Johnny Carson
- Venue: Miami Beach Auditorium, Miami Beach, Florida, United States
- Broadcaster: CBS
- Entrants: 48
- Placements: 15
- Debuts: Ireland; Jamaica; Madagascar; Republic of China; Rhodesia and Nyasaland; Scotland; United States Virgin Islands; Wales
- Withdrawals: Costa Rica; Hong Kong; Jordan; New Zealand; Portugal; Suriname; Tunisia
- Returns: Ceylon; Guatemala; Puerto Rico; Turkey
- Winner: Marlene Schmidt; West Germany
- Congeniality: Eleftheria Deloutsi (Greece)
- Photogenic: Sharon Brown (United States)

Miss Universe 1961 was the 10th Miss Universe pageant, held at the Miami Beach Auditorium in Miami Beach, Florida, on 15 July 1961.

At the conclusion of the event, Linda Bement of the United States crowned Marlene Schmidt of the West Germany as Miss Universe 1961. Schmidt was the first representative of the West Germany to win the contest.

Contestants from forty-eight countries and territories competed in this year's pageant. The pageant was hosted by Johnny Carson.

== Background ==
=== Selection of participants ===
Contestants from forty-eight countries and territories were selected to compete in the pageant. Two candidates were appointed to replace the original winner.

==== Replacements ====
Both, Ana Griselda Vegas of Venezuela and Pilar Ramos of Spain replaced Gloria Lilue and María del Carmen Cervera, respectively, as the latter chose to compete at Miss International 1961.

==== Debuts, returns, and withdrawals ====
This edition saw the debuts of Ireland, Jamaica, Madagascar, the Republic of China, Rhodesia and Nyasaland, Scotland, the United States Virgin Islands, and Wales, and the returns of Ceylon, Guatemala, Puerto Rico, and Turkey. Ceylon and Puerto Rico last competed in 1957, while the others last competed in 1959. Costa Rica, Hong Kong, Jordan, New Zealand, Portugal, Suriname, and Tunisia withdrew after their respective organizations failed to hold a national competition or appoint a delegate.

Helen Tan of Malaya and Julie Koh of Singapore were supposed to compete in the pageant. However, they chose to compete at Miss International in Long Beach, California instead. Koh eventually competed at Miss Universe the following year.

== Results ==
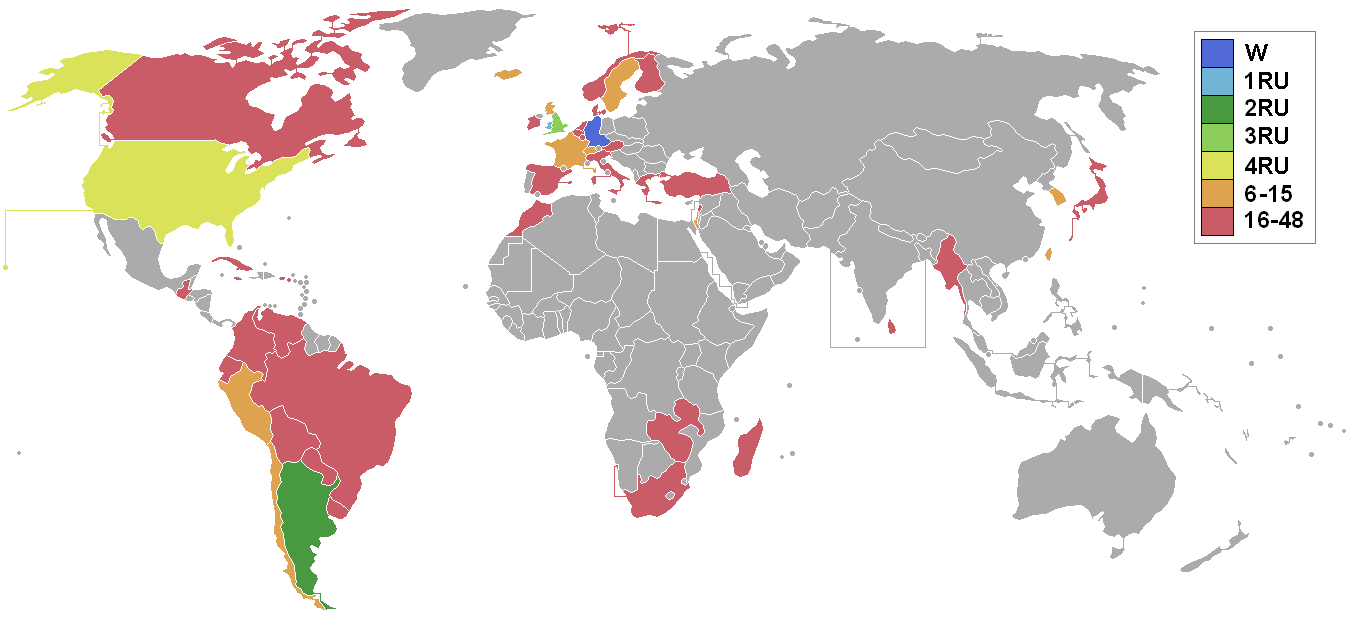
Miss Universe 1961 participating countries and territories

=== Placements ===
Placement	Contestant
Miss Universe 1961	West Germany – Marlene Schmidt
1st Runner-Up	Wales – Rosemarie Frankland
2nd Runner-Up	Argentina – Adriana Gardiazábal
3rd Runner-Up	England – Arlette Dobson
4th Runner-Up	United States – Sharon Brown
Top 15	Chile – Gloria Silva; France – Simone Darot; Iceland – Kristjana Magnúsdóttir; Israel – Atida Pisanti; Peru – Carmela Stein; Republic of China – Li-Ling Wang; Scotland – Susan Jones; South Korea – Yang-hee Seo; Sweden – Gunilla Knutsson; Switzerland – Liliane Burnier

=== Special awards ===
Award	Contestant
Miss Congeniality	Greece – Eleftheria Deloutsi
Miss Photogenic	United States – Sharon Brown

== Pageant ==
=== Format ===
Same with 1955, fifteen semi-finalists were chosen at the preliminary competition that consists of the swimsuit and evening gown competition. Each of the fifteen semi-finalists gave a short speech during the final telecast using their native languages. Afterwards, the fifteen semi-finalists paraded again in their swimsuits and evening gowns, and the five finalists were eventually chosen.

=== Selection committee ===
- Peter Demaerel – Director of the Belgian-American Tourist Office in the United States
- Gustavo Lorca Rojas – Former mayor of Viña del Mar
- Raul Manteola – Argentinian painter
- Russell Patterson – American cartoonist
- Michel Tapié – French painter
- Earl Wilson – American journalist and columnist
- Miyoko Yanagita – Japanese fashion designer

== Contestants ==
Forty-eight contestants competed for the title.

Country/Territory	Contestant	Age (Note: Ages at the time of the pageant)	Hometown
Argentina	Adriana Gardiazábal	18	Buenos Aires
Austria	Ingrid Bayer	20	Vorarlberg
Belgium	Nicole Ksinozenicki	18	Saint-Gilles
Bolivia	Gloria Soruco	19	Santa Cruz de la Sierra
Brazil	Staël Abelha	19	Caratinga
Burma	Khin Myint Myint	18	Daik-U
Canada	Wilda Reynolds	19	Toronto
Ceylon	Ranjini Jayatilleke	19	Colombo
Chile	Gloria Silva	22	Santiago
Colombia	Patricia Whitman	21	Medellín
Cuba	Martha García Vieta	25	Miami
Denmark	Jette Nielsen	18	Copenhagen
Ecuador	Yolanda Palacios	18	Guayaquil
England	Arlette Dobson	18	Surrey
Finland	Ritva Wächter	20	Naantali
France	Simone Darot	19	Paris
Greece	Eleftheria Deloutsi	18	Athens
Guatemala	Anabelle Sáenz	19	Guatemala City
Holland	Gita Kamman	22	Amsterdam
Iceland	Kristjana Magnúsdóttir	21	Reykjanesbær
Ireland	Jean Russell	21	Lisburn
Israel	Atida Pisanti	19	Haifa
Italy	Vivianne Romano	21	Lazio
Jamaica	Marguerite LeWars	20	Kingston
Japan	Akemi Toyama	20	Tokyo
Lebanon	Leila Antaki	22	Beirut
Luxembourg	Vicky Schoos	18	Luxembourg City
Madagascar	Jacqueline Robertson	22	Antananarivo
Morocco	Irene Gorsse	–	Rabat
Norway	Rigmor Trengereid	19	Bergen
Paraguay	María Cristina Osnaghi	18	Asunción
Peru	Carmela Stein	20	Lima
Puerto Rico	Enid del Valle	20	Aguadilla
Republic of China	Li-Ling Wang	19	Taipei
Rhodesia and Nyasaland	Jonee Sierra	19	Salisbury
Scotland	Susan Jones	20	Aberdeen
South Africa	Marina Christelis	20	Johannesburg
South Korea	Yang-hee Seo	21	Seoul
Spain	Pilar Ramos	19	Madrid
Sweden	Gunilla Knutsson	20	Ystad
Switzerland	Liliane Burnier	19	Geneva
Turkey	Gülseren Uysal	18	Istanbul
United States	Sharon Brown	18	Minden
United States Virgin Islands	Priscila Bonilla	18	Charlotte Amalie
Uruguay	Susanna Ferrari	–	Montevideo
Venezuela	Ana Griselda Vegas	20	Caracas
Wales	Rosemarie Frankland	18	Lancashire
West Germany	Marlene Schmidt	24	Stuttgart
