= Miss USA 1959 =

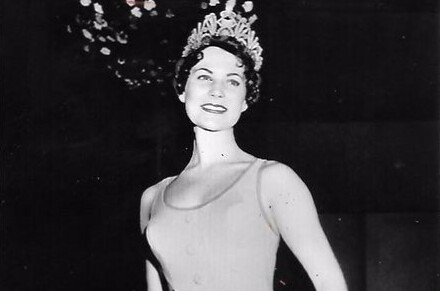
- Terry Lynn Huntingdon, Miss USA 1959
- Date: July 22, 1959
- Venue: Long Beach, California
- Entrants: 46
- Placements: 15
- Winner: Terry Huntingdon; California

Miss USA 1959 was the eighth Miss USA pageant, held at the Long Beach Municipal Auditorium, Long Beach, California on 22 July 1959.

At the end of the event, Eurlyne Howell of Louisiana crowned Terry Huntingdon of California as Miss USA 1959. It is the first victory of California in the pageant's history. Huntingdon later competed at Miss Universe and was named as second runner-up to eventual winner, Akiko Kojima.

Contestants from 46 states and cities competed in the pageant.

== Results ==
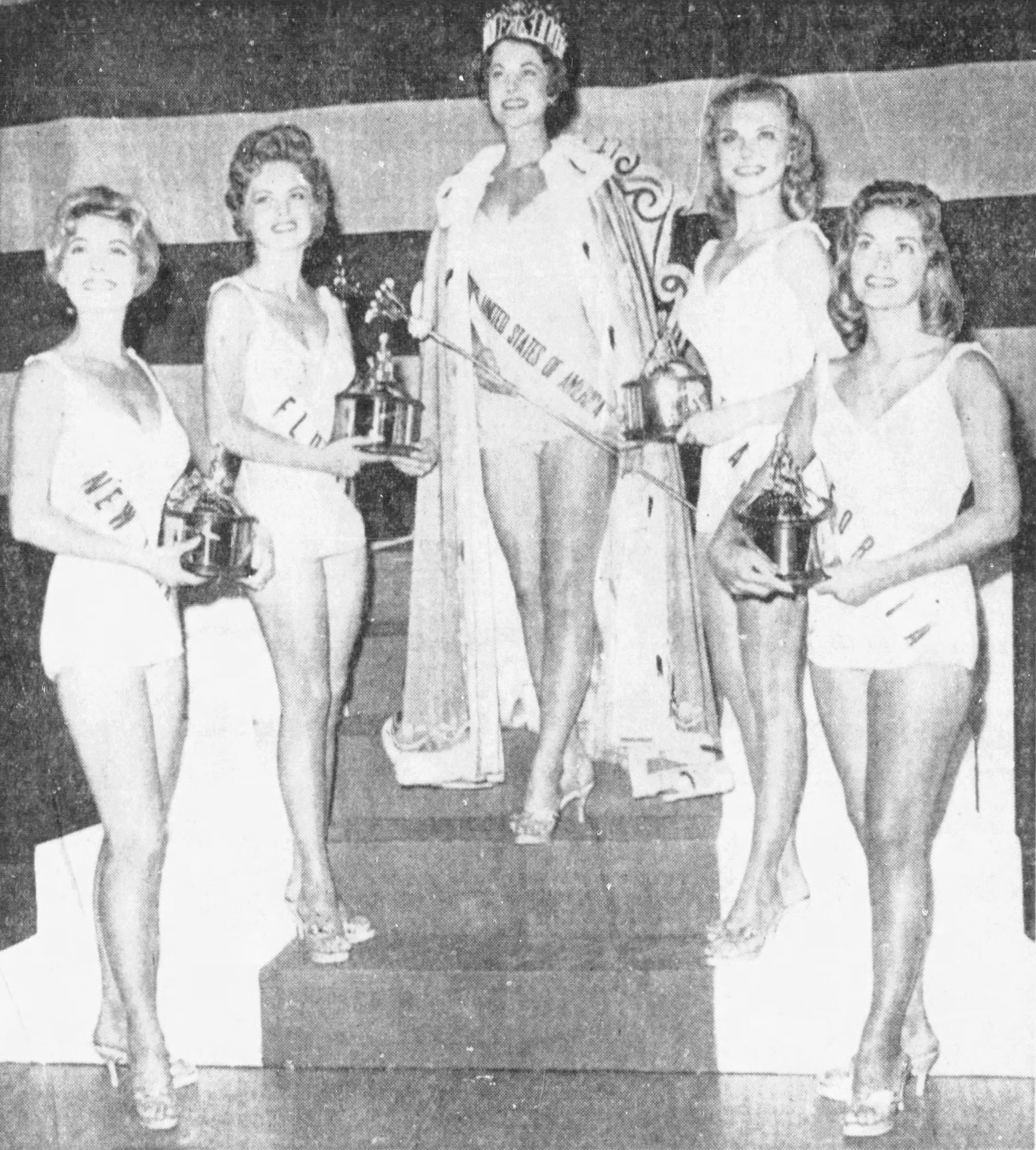
Miss USA 1959 and her court (from left to right): Arlene Nesbitt, Nanita Greene, Carelgean Douglas, and Dorothy Gladys Taylor.

=== Placements ===
Placement	Contestant
Miss USA 1959	California – Terry Lynn Huntingdon
1st runner-up	Texas – Carelgean Douglas
2nd runner-up	Florida – Nanita Greene
3rd runner-up	Georgia – Dorothy Taylor
4th runner-up	New York — Arlene Nesbitt
Top 15	Alabama – Pat Sullivan; Arkansas – Donna Needham; Colorado – Dianne Gardner; Iowa – Kay Nielson; Louisiana – Mary LoBianco; Maine – Carolyn Komant; Maryland – Diane White; Missouri – Barbara Stell; Nevada – Joy Blaine; West Virginia – Wilda Estep

== Contestants ==
46 contestants competed for the title.

State	Contestant	Age (Note: Ages at the time of the pageant)	Hometown	Notes
Alabama	Pat Sullivan	21	Birmingham	
Alaska	Anna Lekanof	23	Fairbanks	
Arizona	Patricia June Varga	18	Phoenix	
Arkansas	Donna Sue Needham	19	Berryville	
California	Terry Lynn Huntingdon	19	Mount Shasta	2nd runner-up at Miss Universe 1959
Colorado	Dianne Lee Gardner	20	Denver	
Connecticut	Jayne Burghardt	21	Hartford	
Delaware	Linda E. Humes	18	Harrington	
District of Columbia	Shirley Ann Hobbs	20	Washington, D.C.	
Florida	Nanita Greene	21	Coral Gables	
Georgia	Dorothy Gladys Taylor	18	Valdosta	
Idaho	Pat Sherburne	19	Pocatello	
Illinois	Arlene Kay	19	Western Springs	
Indiana	Anita Watkins	18	Monticello	
Iowa	Kay Nielson	22	Council Bluffs	Former Miss Nebraska 1957
Kentucky	Sherree Owens	22	Louisville	
Louisiana	Mary LoBianco	19	Baton Rouge	
Maine	Carolyn Komant	18	Kittery	
Maryland	Diane Dolores White	24	Baltimore	3rd runner up at Miss World USA 1961; Mother of Miss Georgia USA 1989, Michele Nemeth
Massachusetts	Beatrice Lee Duprey	20	Weymouth	Competed in the 1960 Miss Sun Fun USA Pageant
Michigan	Susan Westergaard	20	Detroit	
Minnesota	Muriel Fairbanks	23	Minneapolis	
Missouri	Barbara Jayne Stell	23	Kansas City	
Montana	Bar-Beth Smith	18	Butte	
Nebraska	Priscilla Eckrich	21	Lincoln	
Nevada	Joy Blaine	23	Reno	
New Hampshire	Nancy Jeanne Gray	20	Somersworth	
New Jersey	Geraldine Binder	18	Irvington	
New Mexico	Carol Jones	23	Albuquerque	Replaced Sue Ingersoll after she withdrew
New York	Arlene Nesbitt	21	Mineola	2nd runner-up in the 1960 Miss Sun Fun USA Pageant
North Carolina	Peggy Anne Brown	20	Sunbury	
North Dakota	Patricia Ann McGinley	18	Minot	
Ohio	Marie di Carlo	18	Poland	
Oklahoma	Sondra Osborne	18	Oklahoma City	
Pennsylvania	Rhoda Mae Kachiko	19	Delmont	
Rhode Island	Gloria Ryder	18	Providence	
South Carolina	Mary Anne Powell	20	Union	
South Dakota	Jeannine Kay Stratton	19	Sioux Falls	
Tennessee	Marcia Daniel	19	Memphis	
Texas	Carelgean Douglas	20	Corpus Christi	
Utah	Melanie Canfield	18	Tremonton	
Vermont	Sandra Jean Laquerre	21	Barre	
Virginia	Pat Poindexter	18	Salem	
Washington	Leah Jo Robinson	20	Bellingham	
West Virginia	Wilda Sue Estep	18	Elkview	
Wisconsin	Charlene Krause	19	Milwaukee	
