= Miss USA 1960 =

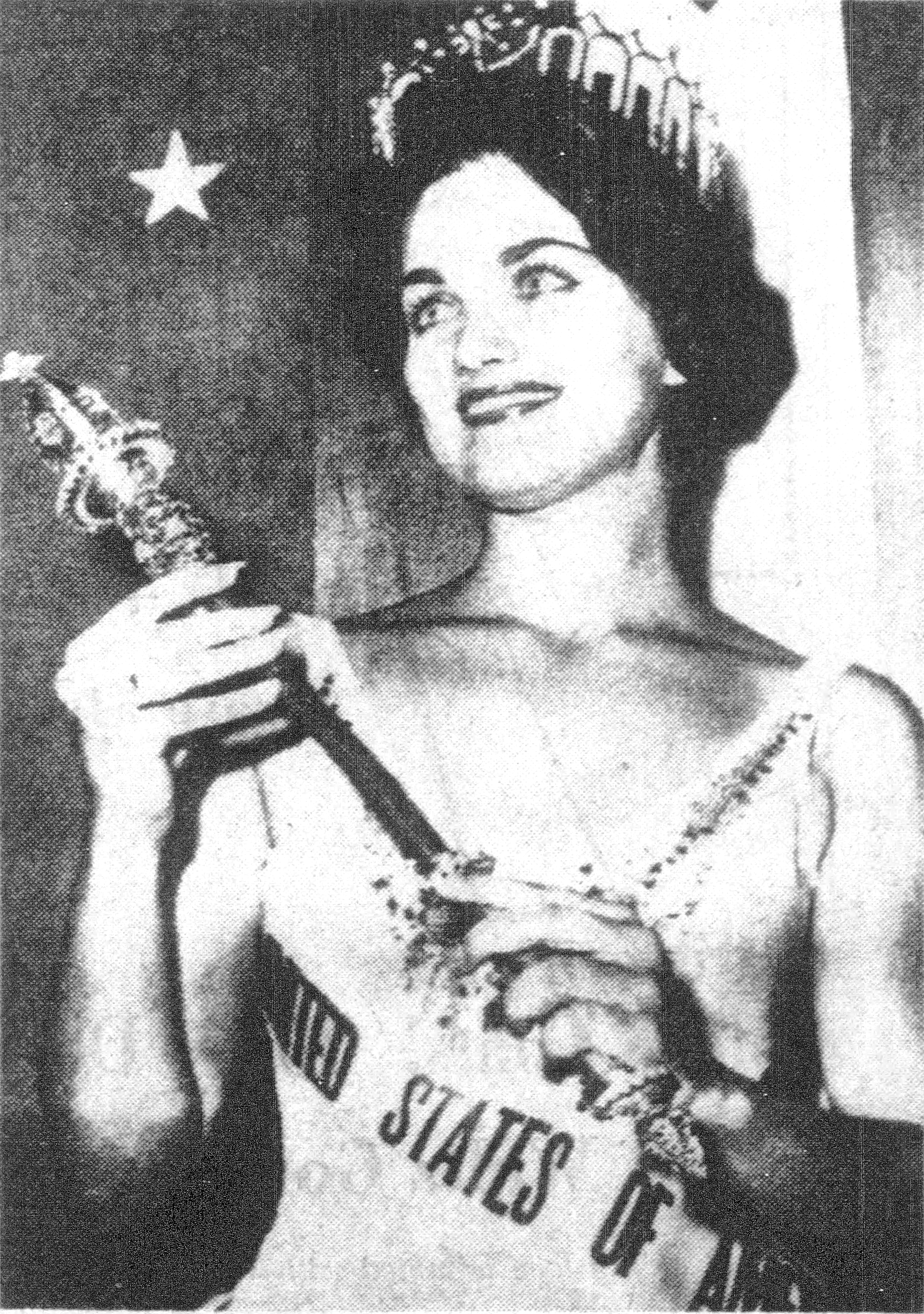
- Linda Bement, Miss USA 1960
- Date: July 7, 1960
- Presenters: Charles Collingwood
- Venue: Miami Beach Auditorium, Miami Beach, Florida
- Entrants: 45
- Placements: 15
- Withdrawals: Minnesota; Mississippi; Nebraska; Nevada; Oregon; Washington
- Winner: Linda Bement; Utah

Miss USA 1960 was the ninth Miss USA pageant, held at the Miami Beach Auditorium, Miami Beach, Florida on July 7, 1960.

At the end of the event, Linda Bement of Utah was crowned by Terry Huntingdon of California as Miss USA 1960. It is the second victory of Utah in the pageant's history. Bement later competed at Miss Universe and won.

Contestants from 45 states and cities competed in this year's pageant. The competition was hosted by Charles Collingwood.

== Results ==
=== Placements ===
Placement	Contestant
Miss USA 1960	Utah – Linda Bement
1st runner-up	New York – Mary Rodites
2nd runner-up	Alabama – Margaret Jo Gordon
3rd runner-up	North Carolina – Lyndia Ann Tarleton
4th runner-up	Florida – Nancy Wakefield
Top 15	California – Teri Janssen; Connecticut – Joyce Trautwig; Iowa – Trudy Shulkin; Louisiana – Judy Fletcher; Massachusetts – Barbara Feldman; Michigan – Judith Richards; Missouri – Marilyn Jean Stalcup; New Jersey – Sandra "Sandy" Chudy; Ohio – Corrine Huff; West Virginia – Garnett Pugh

== Contestants ==
45 contestants competed for the title.

State/City	Contestant	Age (Note: Ages at the time of the pageant)	Hometown	Notes
Alabama	Margaret Jo Gordon	22	Homewood	Competed in the Miss United States 1960 pageant
Alaska	Evelyn Bly	23	Fairbanks	
Arizona	Virginia Crook	18	Phoenix	
Arkansas	Gene Chambers	18	Danville	Married to Jerry Jones, owner of the Dallas Cowboys
California	Teri Janssen	18	Los Angeles	
Colorado	Karen Eickermann	19	Littleton	
Connecticut	Joyce Elain Trautwig	19	Hartford	
Delaware	Rose Anne Reed	–	Wilmington	
District of Columbia	Doris Lee Jones	–	Washington, D.C.	
Florida	Nancy Wakefield	19	Winter Haven	
Georgia	Cecilia Upton	19	Rockmart	
Idaho	Margie Davis	22	Pocatello	
Illinois	Patricia Thompson	21	Chicago	
Indiana	June Cochran	18	Indianapolis	Later Miss Indiana World 1962; Competed in the Miss USA World 1962 pageant Later Playboy Playmate of the Year 1963
Iowa	Trudy Shulkin	21	Sioux City	
Kansas	Peggy Patterson	21	Kansas City	
Kentucky	Barbara Joan Lovins	19	Alexandria	
Louisiana	Judy Rebecca Fletcher	18	Alexandria	
Maine	Terry Tripp	–	Lewiston	Previously Miss Maine 1958
Maryland	Jerri Fiorilli	–	Baltimore	
Massachusetts	Barbara Gale Feldman	20	Natick	
Michigan	Judith Richards	19	Dearborn	
Missouri	Marilyn Jean Stalcup	20	Normandy	
Montana	Joanne Lane	–	–	
New Hampshire	Joan Joyce Chesleing	–	Hampstead	
New Jersey	Sandra "Sandy" Chudy	20	Bound Brook	
New Mexico	Kaye Smith	18	Albuquerque	
New York	Mary Rodites	19	Port Jefferson	
North Carolina	Lyndia Ann Tarleton	19	Wingate	
North Dakota	Twila Fleckton	19	Drayton	
Ohio	Corrine Huff	19	Youngstown	Replaced Kathy Justice as Miss Ohio; First African-American representing an American state in the pageant
Oklahoma	Suzanna Moore	18	Oklahoma City	
Pennsylvania	Betsy Reeves	18	Newtown	
Rhode Island	Lorelei White	20	Cranston	
South Carolina	Margaret Thompson	–	Sumter	
South Dakota	Patricia Klith	20	Sioux Falls	
Tennessee	Christine McSwain	22	Memphis	
Texas	Pat Cloud	20	Houston	
Utah	Linda Jeanne Bement	18	Salt Lake City	Miss Universe 1960
Vermont	Carole Mary Demas	–	Burlington	
Virginia	Elizabeth Noreen Fulford	18	Norfolk	
West Virginia	Carole Garnett Pugh	18	Queen Shoals	
Wisconsin	Sharyn Chalik	19	Milwaukee	
Wyoming	Anita Simon	–	Cheyenne	
