= Miss Burma (1947–1962) =

Historical beauty pageant in Myanmar

Miss Burma မယ်ဗမာ
- Formation: 1947; 79 years ago
- Defunct: 1961; 65 years ago
- Type: Beauty Pageant
- Location: Union of Burma
- Official language: Burmese, English

Miss Burma was the national beauty pageant in Burma (now Myanmar) from 1947 to 1962. The winner of Miss Burma also represented her country at the Miss Universe.

In 1962, the pageant was banned by the Union Revolutionary Council government because it was considered against Burmese culture.

== History ==
The term Miss Burma was introduced in Myanmar through the MISS ORGANIZATION and held the Miss Burma 1959 Local Beauty Pageant Competition. At the end of the event, Than Than Aye was competed in Miss Burma 1959. She was the Burma's first contestant in the Miss Universe pageant.

In 1960, the Miss Burma Organization competed for Burma beauty pageants to Big Four international beauty pageants. That year, Myint Myint May competed in Miss Universe 1960 and received the Miss Congeniality Award, a Special Award and Ma Sen Aye competed in Miss World 1960. After that year, Khin Myint Myint won the Miss Burma beauty pageant and represented her country at the Miss Universe 1961 event held at Miami Beach, Florida and Manie Pu also completed in Miss International 1961. In 1962, the Miss Burma was the golden era of the Myanmar. But, the Burmese government abolished the Miss Burma pageant because they thought it was against the Burmese culture.

== Titleholders ==
The winner of Miss Burma also represented her country at the Miss Universe competition.

| Year | Edition | Miss Burma | Runners up | |
| Year | Edition | Miss Burma | First | Second |
|---|---|---|---|---|
| 1947 | 1st | Daw Li Cho (Dolly Cho) (Mandalay Region) May Myo | Hteik Su Phaya Htwe; Rangoon | Unknown |
| 1948 | 2nd | Khin San Kywe (Ayeyarwady Region) Pyapon | Yin Yin Mya (Mandalay Region) Mandalay | Le Le Win (Ayeyarwady Region) Hinthada |
| 1949 | 3rd | Phyu Phyu Shein; Rangoon | Unknown | Unknown |
| 1950-1952 | 4th | Ma Sein Aye; Rangoon | Unknown | Unknown |
| 1955 | 5th | Nu Nu Yi (Bago Region) Taungoo | Khin Thein Thein; Rangoon | Ma Sein Aye; Rangoon |
| 1956-1958 | 6th | Louisa Benson Craig; Rangoon | Unknown | Unknown |
| 1959 | 7th | Than Than Aye; Rangoon | Unknown | Unknown |
| 1960 | 8th | Myint Myint May; Rangoon | Unknown | Unknown |
| 1961 | 9th | Khin Myint Myint (Bago Region) Daik-U | Unknown | Unknown |

=== Miss Mandalay ===
| Year | Edition | Miss Mandalay | Note |
|---|---|---|---|
| 1948 | 1st | Yin Yin Mya | 1st runner-up of Miss Burma 1948 |
| 1949 | 2nd | Khin Nyunt Yi | |
| 1952 | 3rd | Kyu Kyu Cho | Sister of Daw Li Cho, Miss Burma 1947 |
| 1954 | 4th | Kyi Kyi Mya | |
| 1961 | 5th | Khin Than Nu | |

== Major International competitions ==
- : Declared as Winner
- : Ended as runner-up or top 5/6 qualification
- : Ended as one of the finalists or semifinalists
- : Ended as special awards winner

=== Miss Universe ===
| Year | Representative's Name | Division | Title | Placement | Special Awards |
|---|---|---|---|---|---|
| 1958 | Louisa Benson Craig | Rangoon | Miss Burma 1958 | Did not compete | |
| 1959 | Than Than Aye | Rangoon | Miss Burma 1959 | Unplaced | |
| 1960 | Myint Myint May | Rangoon | 1st runner up of Miss Burma 1960 | Unplaced | Miss Congeniality |
| 1961 | Khin Myint Myint | (Bago Region) Daik-U | Miss Burma 1961 | Unplaced | |

=== Miss World ===
| Year | Representative's Name | Division | Title | Placement | Special Awards |
|---|---|---|---|---|---|
| 1960 | Ma Sein Aye | Rangoon | Miss Burma 1960 | Unplaced | |

=== Miss International ===
| Year | Representative's Name | Division | Title | Placement | Special Awards |
|---|---|---|---|---|---|
| 1961 | Minnie Pu | (Mandalay Region) Mandalay | Top 5 at Miss Burma 1960 | Unplace | |

== See also ==
- List of beauty pageants
