= Myint Myint May =

Burmese model and beauty queen

- မြင့်မြင့်မေ
- Born: Burma
- Beauty pageant titleholder
- Title: Miss Burma 1960
- Major competitions: Miss Burma 1960 (Winner); Miss Universe 1960; Miss Congeniality Award

Myint Myint May (Burmese: မြင့်မြင့်မေ) was a Burmese model and beauty pageant titleholder who was crowned Miss Burma 1960. She died in December 2004.

As a Miss Universe 1960 contestant representing Burma, she won the award of Miss Congeniality. This was the first time Myanmar won that title, but she was unplaced in Miss Universe 1960.

Awards and achievements
Preceded by Than Than Aye	Miss Burma; Miss Burma 1960	Succeeded by Khin Myint Myint
