= Miss Utah USA =

US beauty pageant

- Formation: 1952
- Type: Beauty pageant
- Headquarters: Salt Lake City
- Location: Utah
- Official language: English
- Exec. Director: Shanna Moakler
- Affiliations: Miss USA
- Website: Official website

The Miss Utah USA competition is the pageant that selects the representative for the state of Utah for the Miss USA pageant. From 2001 to 2007, it was produced by Red Curtain Productions. Casting Crowns Productions directed the pageant from 2007 to 2018 under the directorship of former Miss Missouri USA Britt Boyse. Smoak Productions became the new director for Miss and Teen pageants in 2019 under executive director and Miss USA 1995 Shanna Moakler.

Utah has been successful at Miss USA, with 23 placements as of 2024. The most consistent period was in the 1950s and 1960s. Utah has produced two Miss USA winners, in 1960 (Linda Bement, who went on to win the Miss Universe 1960 title) and in 2023. Miss Utah USA 1957, Charlotte Sheffield, also won the Miss USA 1957 crown after the original titleholder (Leona Gage, Miss Maryland USA) was dethroned. Utah has a strong recent record, having placed in four out of five pageants between 2005 and 2009. The most recent placement and win was Venezuelan-American Noelia Voigt in 2023.

Five Miss Utah USAs are former Miss Utah Teen USAs who competed at Miss Teen USA. Three placed at Miss USA, which eclipsed their Teen performances. They are also very similar to the Miss North Carolina USA titleholders who also placed at Miss USA rather than Miss Teen USA. Two also competed in Miss Utah.

The current titleholder is Alayzia Christopher of Park City, was crowned Miss Utah USA 2026 on June 7, 2026, at Rose Wagner Performing Arts Center Jeanné Wagner Theatre in Salt Lake City, Utah. She represented Utah at Miss USA 2026, finishing as 4th runner-up.

== Gallery of titleholders ==
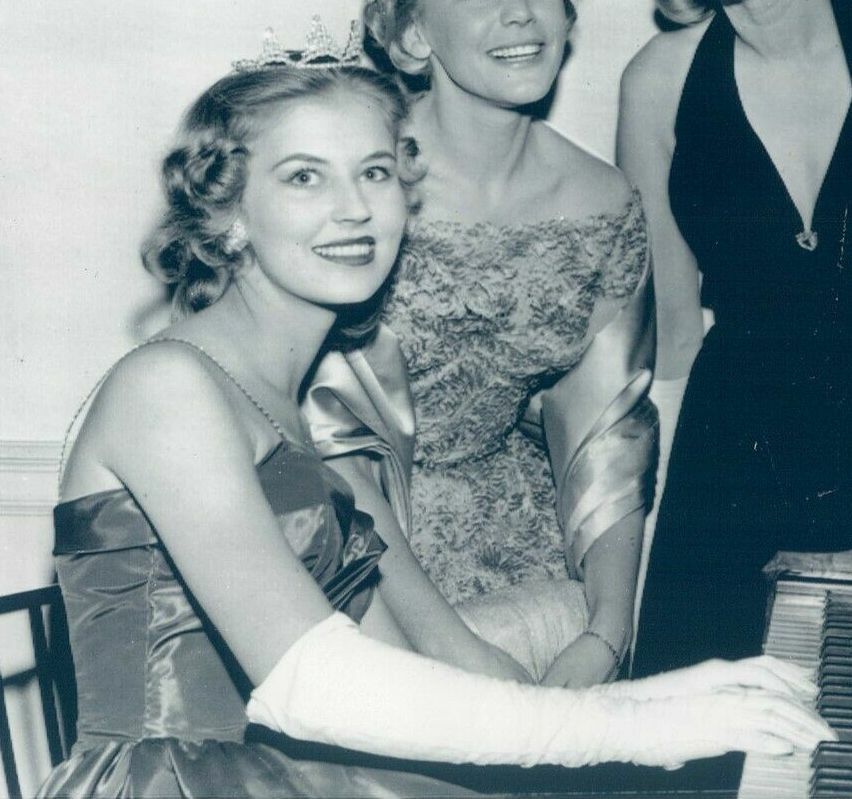
Charlotte Sheffield, Miss Utah USA 1957, Miss USA 1957.

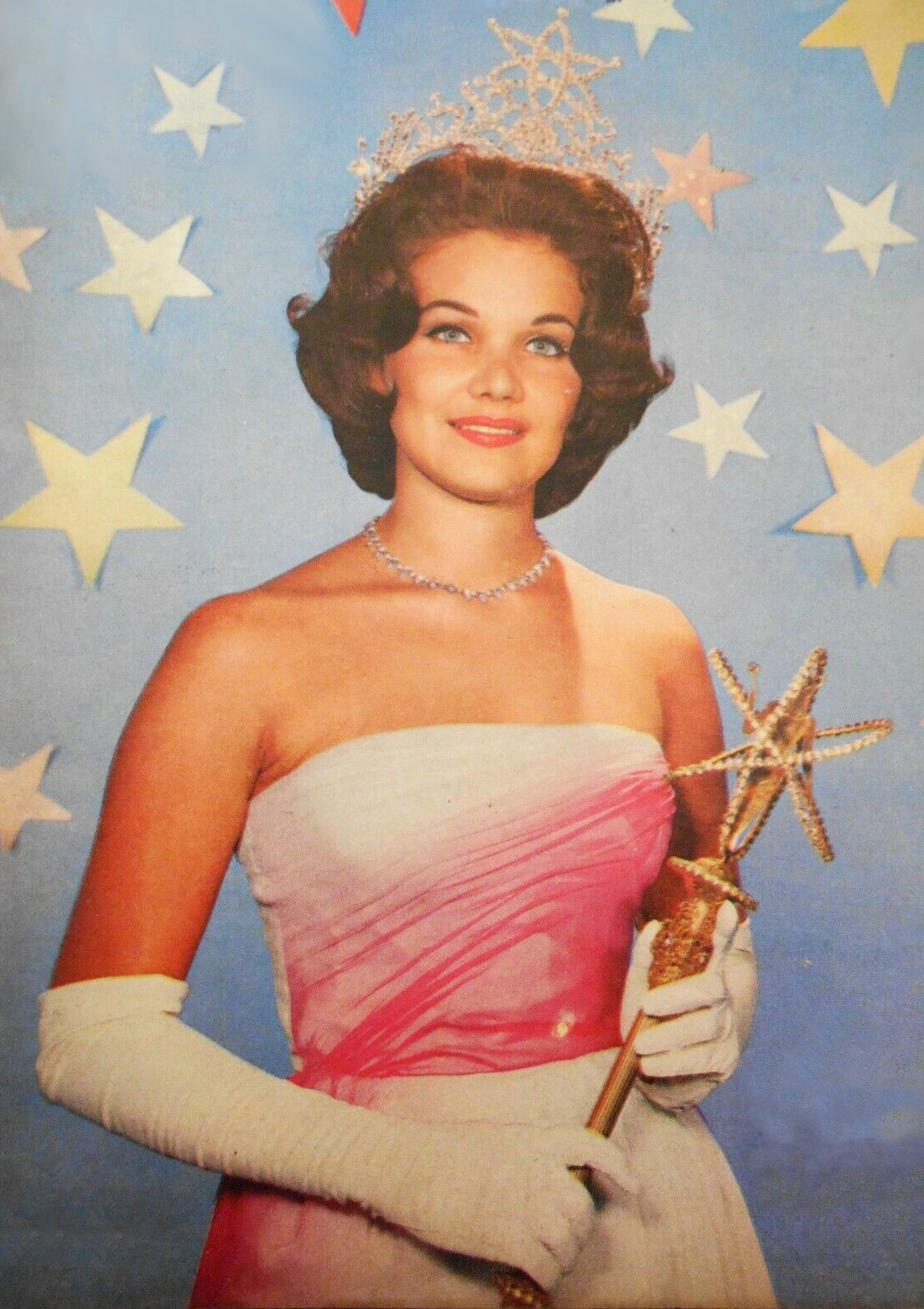
Linda Bement, Miss Utah USA 1960, Miss USA 1960 & Miss Universe 1960

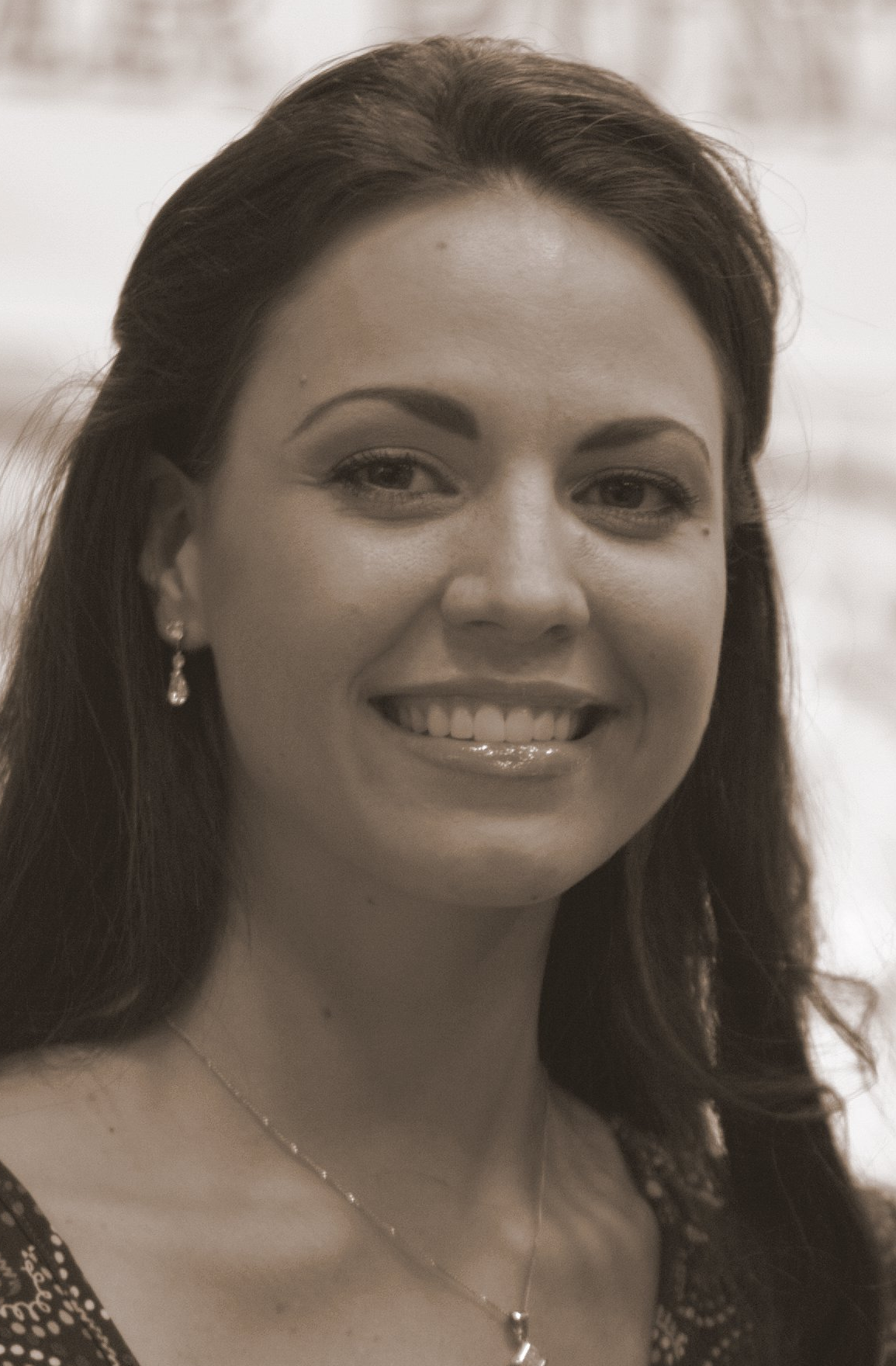
Heather Anderson, Miss Utah USA 2007

== Results summary ==
=== Placements ===
- Miss USA: Linda Bement (1960), Noelia Voigt (2023)
- 1st runner-up: Charlotte Sheffield (1957) (Note: Charlotte Sheffield was 1st runner-up at Miss USA, but succeeded the title when Mary Leona Gage was dethroned.)
- 2nd runner-up: Susan Gasser (1982)
- 3rd runners-up: Janet Joy Erikson (1964), Laura Chukanov (2009), Marissa Powell (2013)
- 4th runners-up: Shauna Wood (1953), Alayzia Christopher (2026)
- Top 5/6: Temple Taggart (1997), Melissa Leigh Anderson (1998)
- Top 10/12: Tracy Kennick (1996), Margo Flynn (1978), Heather Anderson (2007)
- Top 15/16: Cheryl Brown (1956), Sandra Puch (1958), Janet Marie Hawley (1961), Patricia Profaizer (1962), Janice Sadler (1965), Denice Blair (1966), Marin Poole (2005), Julia Bachison (2008), Jamie Crandall (2011), JessiKate Riley (2021)

Utah holds a record of 23 placements at Miss USA.

=== Awards ===
- Miss Congeniality: Peggy Moore (1972)
- Miss Photogenic: Marissa Powell (2013)
- Best State Costume 2nd Place: JessiKate Riley (2021)

== Winners ==
Color key

- Declared the Winner
- Finished as a runner-up
- Finished as one of the finalists or semifinalists

Year	Name	Hometown	Age (Note: Age at the time of the Miss USA pageant)	Local title	Placement at Miss USA	Special awards at Miss USA	Notes
2026	Alayzia Christopher	Park City	22	Miss Park City	4th runner-up		
2025	Elle Hinojosa	Salt Lake City	24	Miss Central Utah			
2024	Alyssa Chandler	American Fork	21	Miss Timpanogos			
2023	Mariluz Cook	Salt Lake City	25	Miss Salt Lake	Originally 1st runner-up, later assumed title after Voigt won Miss USA 2023		
2023	Noelia Voigt	Park City	23	Miss Park City	Miss USA 2023		Top 20 in Miss Universe 2023
2022	Madison Jonely	Salt Lake City	25	Miss Topaz State	Originally 1st runner-up, later assumed title after Bradley resigned		
2022	Elisabeth Bradley	Salt Lake City	27	Miss Utah County			Resigned
2021	JessiKate Riley	Beaver	24	Miss Utah County	Top 16	Best State Costume – 2nd Place	Previously Miss Utah's Outstanding Teen 2014; Previously Miss Utah 2017; Shortest reigning Miss Utah USA at 9 months and 7 days
2020	Rachel Slawson	Park City	25	Miss Park City			Previously Miss Utah Earth 2019; First openly LGBT person to compete in Miss USA; Longest reigning Miss Utah USA at 1 year, 7 months and 3 days; Later Miss Grand Ireland 2023
2019	Amanda Renée Giroux	Riverdale	22	Miss Riverdale			
2018	Narine Ishhanov	Bluffdale	24	Miss Utah County			Born in Turkmenistan
2017	Baylee Lynn Jensen	South Jordan	22	Miss South Jordan			Daughter of Miss USA 1989 Gretchen Polhemus
2016	Teale Shawn Murdock	Salt Lake City	26	Miss City Creek			Joining under the Miss USA system on her 9th consecutive year, including 1 appearance in Miss Texas Teen USA and 8 straight appearances in Utah as Miss, before winning the title in 2016
2015	Nicol Elizabeth Powell	Salt Lake City	21	Miss Mount Olympus			Sister of Marissa Powell, Miss Utah USA 2013
2014	Angelia Nichole Layton	Salt Lake City	22	Miss Salt Lake			Previously Miss Utah Teen USA 2010 and 3rd runner-up at Miss Teen USA; Contestant on Survivor: Philippines
2013	Marissa Powell	Salt Lake City	20	Miss Mount Olympus	3rd runner-up	Miss Photogenic	Sister of Nicol Powell, Miss Utah USA 2015
2012	Kendyl Carol Bell	Sandy	25	Miss Sandy			
2011	Jamie Lynn Crandall	Salt Lake City	23	Miss Salt Lake County	Top 16		
2010	Katya Dmitrievna Feinstein	Centerville	19	Miss Davis County			Previously Miss Utah Teen USA 2008
2009	Laura Chukanov	Salt Lake City	22	Miss Sandy	3rd runner-up		
2008	Julia Marie Bachison	North Ogden	24	Miss North Ogden	Top 15		Previously Miss Utah 2005 and Preliminary Swimsuit Winner at Miss America
2007	Heather Anderson	Sandy	26		Top 10		Top 10 in Miss Utah MAO 2001
2006	Soben Huon	Provo	23				
2005	Marin Poole	Provo	21		Top 15		Previously Miss Utah Teen USA 2002; Previously Miss Days of '47 (Utah's Pioneer Days Royalty) 2004
2004	Kyla Faye Dickerson	Midvale	23				
2003	Kelly Chapman	South Jordan	24				
2002	Abbie Jane Smith	West Jordan	19				
2001	Tiffany Seaman	Salt Lake City	21				
2000	Keri Hatfield	Bountiful	22				
1999	Rachel Rasmussen	Salt Lake City	21				
1998	Melissa Leigh Anderson	Provo	24		Top 5		Previously Miss Utah Teen USA 1990, Won Miss Teenage California 1986
1997	Temple Marie Taggart	Centerville	21		Top 6		
1996	Tracy Kennick	Price	24		Top 10		Previously Miss Utah Teen USA 1989
1995	Melanie Mitton	Salt Lake City	21				
1994	Vanessa Munns	Provo	23				
1993	Natalie Pyper	Salt Lake City	24				
1992	Nichelle Mickelson	West Valley City	26				
1991	Patti Jo Bender	Sandy	26				
1990	Debra Linn Tingey	Centerville	25				
1989	Zanetta van Zyverden	South Jordan	24				
1988	Suzie Lundell	Park City	20				
1987	Patty Thorpe	Clawson	20				
1986	Stephanie Reber	Salt Lake City	23				Mother of Jessica Richards, Miss Utah's Outstanding Teen 2013
1985	Kim Thompson	Salt Lake City	19				
1984	Michele Lynn Brown	Roy	18				
1983	Launa Lewis	Heber City	18				
1982	Susan Lorraine Gasser	Salt Lake City	22		2nd runner-up		
1981	Tonya Anderson	Orem	19				
1980	Tamara Parsons	Salt Lake City	20				
1979	Victoria Scott	Salt Lake City	25				
1978	Margo Flynn	Salt Lake City	25		Semi-finalist		
1977	Maria Michele Miner	Provo	23				
1976	Debbie Drecksel	Salt Lake City	22				
1975	Andrea Felt	Logan	24				
1974	Halene Petersen	Riverton	20				
1973	Julia Nebeker	Nephi	20				
1972	Peggy Moore	Provo	21			Miss Congeniality	
1971	Janey Montgomery	Hooper	19				
1970	Tamina Roark	Salt Lake City	25				
1969	Anne Meuller	Salt Lake City	23				
1968	Shelle Cannon	Salt Lake City	24				
1967	Marilyn Christiansen	Salt Lake City	21				
1966	Denice Blair	Salt Lake City	19		Semi-finalist		Miss World USA 1966; 6th runner-up at Miss World 1966
1965	Janis Sadler	Salt Lake City	18		Semi-finalist		represented Utah in Miss World USA 1965, did not place
1964	Janet Joy Erikson	Salt Lake City	22		3rd runner-up		
1963	Carla Ann Dinius	Salt Lake City	22				
1962	Patricia Profaizer	Salt Lake City	26		Semi-finalist		
1961	Janet Marie Hawley	Salt Lake City	25		Semi-finalist		
1960	Linda Bement	Salt Lake City	18		Miss USA 1960		Miss Universe 1960
1959	Melanie Canfield	Salt Lake City	20				
1958	Sandra Puch	Salt Lake City	19		Semi-finalist		
1957	Charlotte Sheffield	Salt Lake City	20		1st runner-up		Later Miss USA 1957 after Leona Gage was disqualified.; Competed at Miss World 1957.
1956	Cheryl Brown	Salt Lake City	24		Semi-finalist		
1955	Myrna J. Rasmussen	Salt Lake City	21				
1954	Laverna Laub	Salt Lake City	22				
1953	Shauna Wood	Salt Lake City	23		4th runner-up		
1952	Carol Jean Isbell	Salt Lake City	20				
