= Miss Burma =

Miss Burma is a national beauty pageant in Myanmar (Burma), and may mean:

- Miss Burma (1947–1962), the national beauty pageant in Burma
- Miss Universe Myanmar (2013–present), the beauty pageant in Myanmar
- Miss Burma (2020), the new beauty pageant in 2020
