= Linda Bement =

Miss USA 1960 and Miss Universe 1960

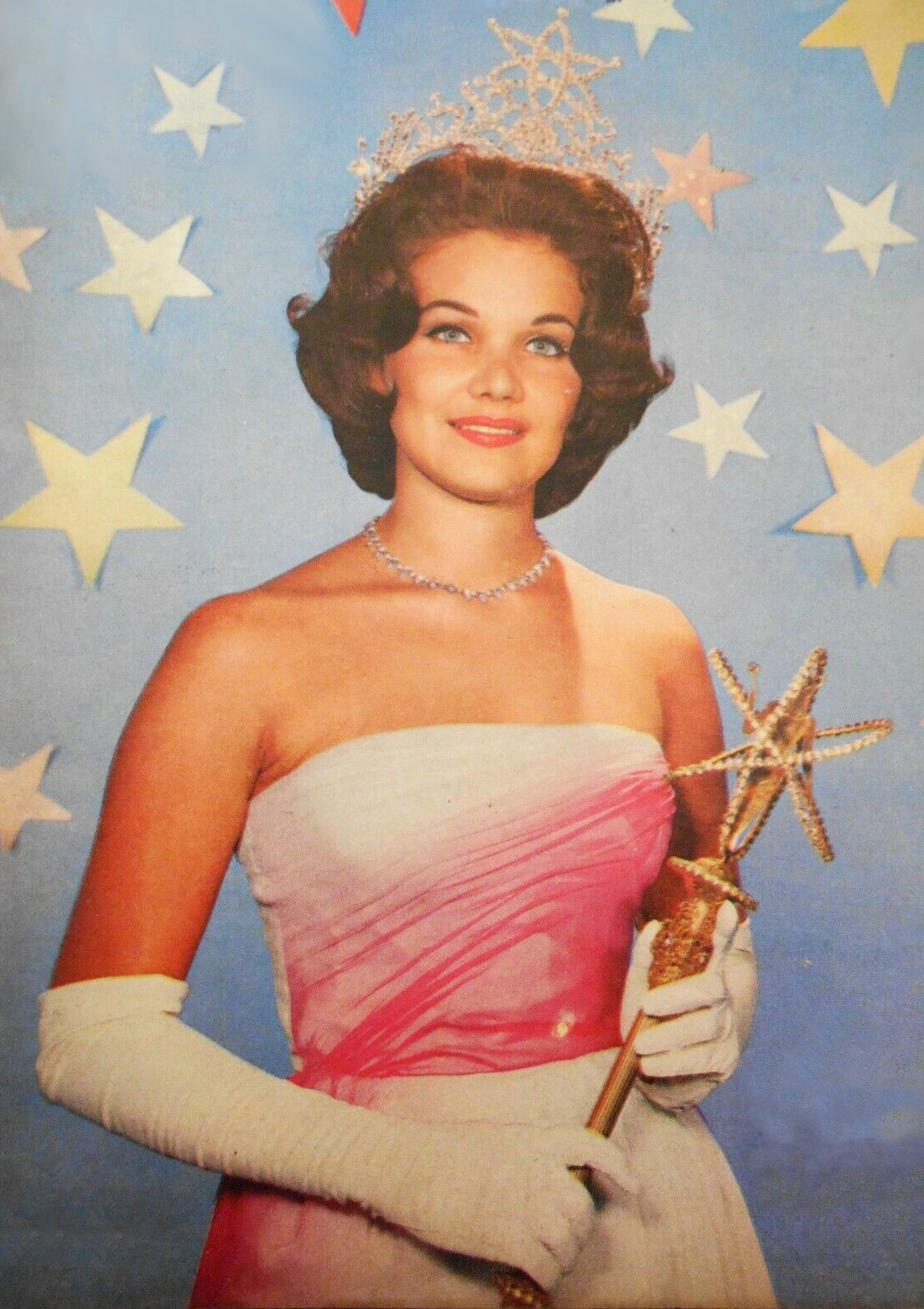
- Bement as Miss Universe 1960
- Born: Linda Jeanne Bement; November 2, 1941; Salt Lake City, Utah, U.S.
- Died: March 19, 2018 (aged 76); Salt Lake City, Utah, U.S.
- Height: 1.68 m (5 ft 6 in)
- Spouses: Manuel Ycaza (m. 1962; div. 1969): Rob Sharp
- Children: 2
- Beauty pageant titleholder
- Title: Miss Utah USA 1960; Miss USA 1960; Miss Universe 1960
- Hair color: Brown
- Eye color: Green
- Major competitions: Miss Utah USA 1960 (Winner); Miss USA 1960 (Winner); Miss Universe 1960 (Winner)

Linda Jeanne Bement (November 2, 1941 – March 19, 2018) was an American model and beauty queen who became the third Miss USA to be crowned Miss Universe.

== Miss Universe 1960 ==
A member of the Church of Jesus Christ of Latter-day Saints, Bement was the second woman from Utah to be crowned Miss USA. She represented the United States in the Miss Universe 1960 pageant, broadcast from Miami Beach, Florida, where she was crowned the winner of the title by Miss Universe 1959 Akiko Kojima of Japan. The 1960 pageant was the first Miss Universe pageant to be televised nationwide.

== Life after Miss Universe ==
In 1962, she married Panamanian-born and future U.S. Racing Hall of Fame Thoroughbred racing jockey Manuel Ycaza. The couple had two children, then divorced in November 1969. She died of natural causes on March 19, 2018, at her home in Salt Lake City.

Awards and achievements
Preceded by (Japan) Akiko Kojima	Miss Universe; 1960	Succeeded by (West Germany) Marlene Schmidt
