= Ingrun Helgard Moeckel =

German model

Ingrun Helgard Möckel
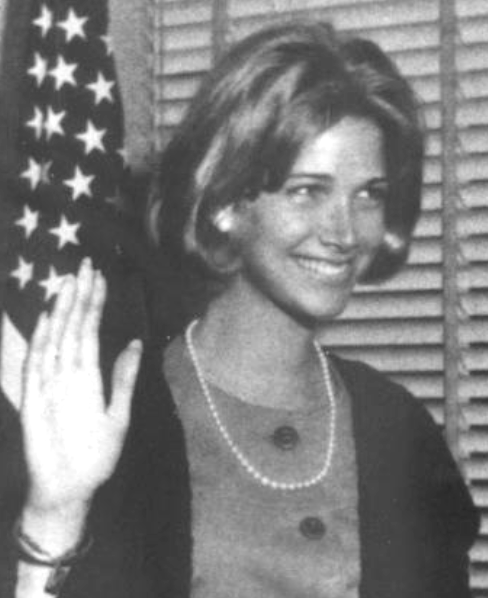
- Ingrun Helgard Möckel, from a 1964 publication of the US Department of State
- Born: 1941
- Died: October 1977 (aged 35–36)
- Other names: Ingrun Moeckel, Ingrun Neckermann
- Occupation: Model
- Known for: Miss Germany (1960), Miss Europe (1961)
- Relatives: Josef Neckermann (father-in-law); Eva Maria Pracht (sister-in-law); Martina Pracht (niece)
- Beauty pageant titleholder
- Title: Miss Germany 1960
- Major competitions: Miss Germany 1960 (Winner); Miss World 1960 (Unplaced); Miss Europe 1961 (Winner)

Ingrun Helgard Möckel (1941 – October 1977), later Ingrun Neckermann, was a German model and beauty pageant titleholder who was crowned Miss Germany 1960 and placed 3rd Runner-Up at Miss World 1960. Later, she was crowned Miss Europe 1961.

== Early life ==
Möckel was from Düsseldorf. At age 9, she immigrated to New Zealand with her mother. She attended Epsom Girls' Grammar School in Auckland. She was a music student in Baden-Baden when she found fame in beauty pageants.

== Career ==
Möckel was crowned Miss Rheinland and Miss Germany in 1960, and Miss Europe in 1961, in Beirut. She was a runner-up at the Miss Universe pageant held in Miami, Florida, in 1960, and at the Miss World pageant that same year, held in London. She worked as a fashion model with the Ford agency in New York.

== Personal life ==
While in New York, Möckel met businessman Johannes Neckermann, son of Josef Neckermann, they married in 1966. They had three children. She died in a car accident in 1977, aged 35 years. Her grave is in the Frankfurt Main Cemetery. In 2001, her three children appeared with singer Billy Joel in a documentary, Die Akte Joel by filmmaker Beate Thalberg.
