= Miss Europe 1961 =

International beauty pageant

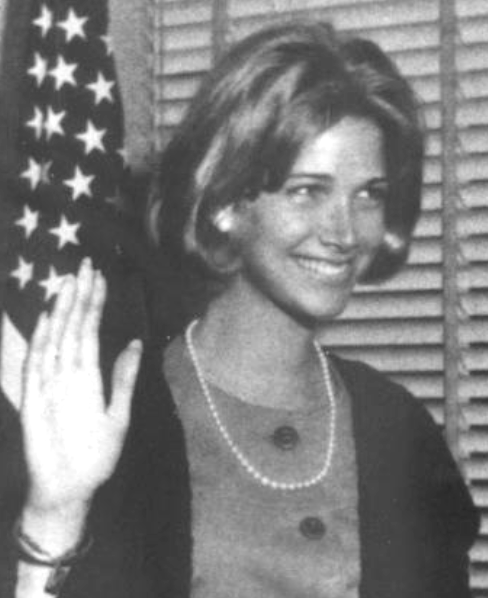
- Ingrun Helgard Möckel
- Date: 6 June 1961
- Venue: Beirut, Lebanon
- Entrants: 17
- Placements: 5
- Winner: Ingrun Helgard Möckel; Germany

Miss Europe 1961 was the 24th edition of the Miss Europe pageant and the 13th edition under the Mondial Events Organization. It was held in Beirut, Lebanon on 6 June 1961. Ingrun Helgard Möckel of Germany was crowned Miss Europe 1961 by outgoing titleholder Anna Ranalli of Italy.

== Results ==
=== Placements ===
Final results	Contestant
Miss Europe 1961	West Germany – Ingrun Helgard Möckel
1st runner-up	England – Arlette Dobson
2nd runner-up	Sweden – Ingrid Andersson
3rd runner-up	Spain – Maria Del Carmen Cervera Fernández Núñez
4th runner-up	France – Yvette Suzanne Dégremont

== Contestants ==
- Austria – Heidi Fischer
- Belgium – UNKNOWN
- Denmark – Sonja Menzel
- England – Arlette Dobson
- Finland – Ritva Tuulikki Wächter
- France – Yvette Suzanne Dégremont
- West Germany – Ingrun Helgard Möckel†
- Greece – Kalliopi Geralexi
- Holland – Anne Marie Brink
- Iceland – Sigrún Ragnarsdóttir
- Italy – Erika Spaggiari
- Luxembourg – Vicky Schoos
- Norway – Rigmor Trengereid
- Spain – Maria Del Carmen Cervera Fernández Núñez
- Sweden – Ingrid Andersson
- Switzerland – Liliane Burnier
- Turkey – Neşe Durukan
