= Norma Cappagli =

Argentine model and Miss World 1960 (1939–2020

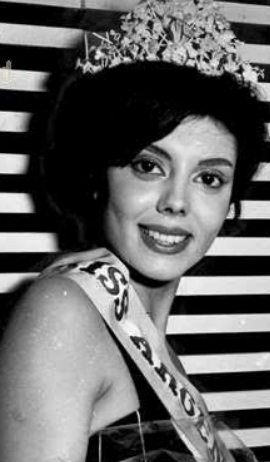
- Born: 20 September 1939; Buenos Aires, Argentina
- Died: 22 December 2020 (aged 81); Buenos Aires, Argentina
- Occupation: Model
- Known for: Winner of Miss World 1960

Norma Gladys Cappagli (20 September 1939 – 22 December 2020) was an Argentine model and beauty queen who won the 1960 Miss World contest, after being crowned Miss Argentina World 1960. She was the first model from Argentina to win the title. The pageant was held in London, United Kingdom. Her prize was £500 and a sports car. After her reign as Miss World ended, Cappagli worked as a model. In 1962, she recorded the song "Sexy World" with Armando Sciascia. The song is featured in the T.V. show Velvet. She died in Fernández Hospital in Buenos Aires on 22 December 2020 after being run over by a bus on 17 December.

Awards and achievements
Preceded by (Netherlands) Corine Rottschäfer	Miss World; 1960	Succeeded by (United Kingdom) Rosemarie Frankland
