= Than Than Aye =

Burmese model and beauty queen

- သန်းသန်းအေး
- Born: Burma
- Beauty pageant titleholder
- Title: Miss Burma 1959
- Major competitions: Miss Burma 1959 (Winner); Miss Universe 1959 (Unplace)

Than Than Aye (Burmese: သန်းသန်းအေး) was a Burmese model and beauty pageant titleholder who was crowned Miss Burma 1959. She was Burma's first contestant in the Miss Universe pageant.

In 1959, the term Miss Burma was introduced in Myanmar through MISS ORGANIZATION and the Miss Burma pageant was held. At the end of the event, Than Than Aye competed in Miss Burma 1959. In that year, she represented Myanmar as the first contestant in the Miss Universe pageant. She competed in the Miss Universe 1959 which was held on 24 July 1959 at Long Beach Municipal Auditorium in Long Beach, California, United States. At the end of the event, she was unplaced.

Awards and achievements
Preceded by	Miss Burma; Miss Burma 1959	Succeeded by Myint Myint May
