= Sodsai Pantoomkomol =

Thai academic and actress (born 1934)

- สดใส พันธุมโกมล
- Born: Sodsai Vanijvadhana; 18 March 1934 (age 92); Bangkok, Siam
- Other name: Sondi Sodsai
- Occupations: Actress; associate professor
- Known for: Pioneering modern theater education in Thailand
- Spouse: Trong Pantoomkomol
- Awards: National Artist (2011)

Academic background
- Education: Chulalongkorn University; UCLA

Academic work
- Discipline: Dramatic arts
- Sub-discipline: Theater
- Institutions: Chulalongkorn University

Sodsai Pantoomkomol (Thai: สดใส พันธุมโกมล; RTGS: Sotsai Phanthumkomon; pronounced [sòt.sǎj pʰān.tʰūm.kōː.mōn]) née Vanijvadhana (วานิชวัฒนา; RTGS: Wanitwatthana;[wāː.nít.wáttʰanāː]; born 18 March 1934) is a Thai actress, beauty pageant titleholder, and teacher of dramatic arts. Also known as Sondi Sodsai from her acting career in the United States during her studies, she returned to Thailand to become a lecturer and associate professor at the Faculty of Arts of Chulalongkorn University, where she founded the Dramatic Arts Department, the first such school in the country. She produced numerous theatrical works throughout her career, and was named National Artist in 2011.

== Early life and education ==
Sodsai Vanijvadhana was born on 18 March 1934 in Bangkok, Siam, to Subhajaya Vanijvadhana, professor and head of the Biology Department at Chulalongkorn University, and Prayongsi Vanijvadhana (née Laksanasut). She attended Mater Dei School, and enrolled at Chulalongkorn's Faculty of Arts. She graduated Bachelor of Arts with honors, and subsequently received a Fulbright scholarship to study teaching English as a foreign language in the United States. However, with encouragement from her advisor Prince Prem Purachatra, she asked to study dramatic arts instead. She enrolled at the University of North Carolina at Chapel Hill, where she caught up on drama courses including acting, directing and playwriting.

== Career in the United States ==
In the course of her study, she was often selected for leading parts in plays, from which she became noticed, and was subsequently invited to appear on television shows such as Tonight Starring Jack Paar and multiple appearances on You Bet Your Life. She also received a record offer with Liberty Records and released an exotica album Sondi in 1959.

She transferred to the University of California, Los Angeles upon the suggestion of her advisers, to be able to pursue more career opportunities. She was then offered a seven-year contract with 20th Century-Fox Television, which she declined, settling for a two-year scholarship and training program instead. During her acting career in Hollywood she was a semi-regular on ABC's Adventures in Paradise with Gardner McKay, and also guest starred on CBS's The Lucy–Desi Comedy Hour. She also appeared in Mickey Spillane's Mike Hammer and The Case of the Dangerous Robin. She went by the alias "Sondi Sodsai" in her acting career because her last name "was too difficult for foreigners to pronounce."

She represented Thailand in the Miss Universe 1959 beauty pageant, where she won the Miss Friendship Award.

== Career in Thailand ==
Upon completing her studies, Sodsai returned to Thailand and became a lecturer at her alma mater, Chulalongkorn University's Faculty of Arts. At the time, formal education in dramatic arts did not exist in Thailand. Sodsai pioneered the field, establishing the Faculty's Department of Dramatic Arts in 1970. She developed curricula based on the theories and practices of Western theater, and helped lay out the foundations of drama education in both tertiary and secondary institutions, as well as in professional circles. Of the initial difficulties of establishing the school, she noted in an interview of how she and her students lacked a theater in which to perform: "We were like nomads, we performed under the trees, on the verandah, in the attic. Practically wherever they allowed us."

Sodsai produced many works, writing and directing numerous plays, as well as editing, acting and composing. Her plays include Yankee Don't Go Home, Tukkata Kaew ("Glass doll"), Yot Pratthana ("Dearest"), Koet Pen Tua Lakhon ("Born a play character"), Phu Phae–Phu Chana ("Loser–winner"), Phrai Nam, Khon Di Thi Sechuan ("Samaritan at Sichuan") and her latest production Lam Di ("the Good Interpreter"), which was released in 2009. She translated and presented works of Western drama, including The Glass Menagerie and Hedda Gabler, for the Thai audience. She also directed television dramas, winning a Mekhala Award for her 1984 adaptation of Chart Korbjitti's novel Kham Phiphaksa ("The Judgement"), which she applied Western technics in directing.

== Personal life and honours ==
Sodsai was married to Trong Pantoomkomol, former head of the Orthopedics Department at the Faculty of Medicine, Chulalongkorn University, with three children. In recognition of her contributions to the field, Sodsai was named a National Artist in performing arts (theatrical and television plays) for 2011, and received the Dushdi Mala Medal in 2014. Thailand's first playwriting competition, the Sodsai Award, and Chulalongkorn University's Sodsai Pantoomkomol Center for Dramatic Arts, which opened in 2011, are named in her honor. Many of her students have gone on to become key figures in the show business, and Ying Thai Magazine has called her the most influential woman in the Thai entertainment industry.
