= Daik-U Township =

Township in the Nyaunglebin district of Bago, Myanmar

Coordinates: 17°47′44″N 96°40′01″E

- Township
- Location in Bago district
- Country: Myanmar
- Region: Bago Region
- District: Nyaunglebin District
- Capital: Daik-U

Population (2014)
  - Total: 202,530
- Time zone: UTC+6.30 (MMT)

Daik-U Township is a township in Nyaunglebin District in the Bago Region of Myanmar. The principal town is Daik-U.

== History ==
Prior to the Second Anglo-Burmese War, the area around Daik-U was composed of small villages. After the British built a railway between Rangoon (now Yangon) and Pyuntaza in 1878, with a railway station at Daik-U, a bustling village emerged, accelerated by the construction of a highway between Rangoon and Mandalay in 1923.

== Demographics ==
Historical population
Year	Pop.	±%
1973	124,474	—
1983	153,210	+23.1%
2014	202,530	+32.2%
Source: ,

The 2014 Myanmar census reported that Daik-U Township had a population of 202,530. The population density was 157.3 people per km^{2}. The census reported that the median age was 25.9 years, and a sex ratio of 91 males per 100 females. There were 45,753 households; the mean household size was 4.3.

=== Ethnic makeup ===
Ethnic composition of Daik-U Township
Ethnic group	Percentage
Bamar	97.6%
Kayin	1.7%
Chin	0.4%
Pa-O	0.3%
Source: 2019 GAD township reports

The Bamar make up the majority of the township's population, while the Karen form the largest minority group.

== Landmarks ==
- Phayagyi, Waso Ward
- Shin Mothti Pagoda, Waso Ward
- Maha Wizitarama Monastery, Thandada Ward
- Seinpan Monastery, Waso Ward
- Kandaw Mingala Monastery, Thandada Ward
- Myo-u Monastery, Waso Ward
- Lawka Yanaung Pagoda, Shweindon Village-tract
- Clear of Conceit all around Pagoda, Taung Galay Village near Mile 74 (Yangon-Mandalay Exp.)

== Notable residents ==
- Khin Myint Myint, Miss Burma 1961 winner and businesswoman
- Moe Moe (Inya), female writer
