= Daik-U =

- Town
- Location in Burma
- Coordinates: 17°47′0″N 96°40′0″E
- Country: Myanmar
- Region: Bago Region
- District: Bago
- Township: Nyaunglebin
- Time zone: UTC+6.30 (MST)
- Area code: 55

Daik-U (Burmese: ဒိုက်ဦး) is a town in Daik-U Township, Bago District, Pegu region in Burma (Myanmar).
