= Terry Huntingdon =

American beauty queen

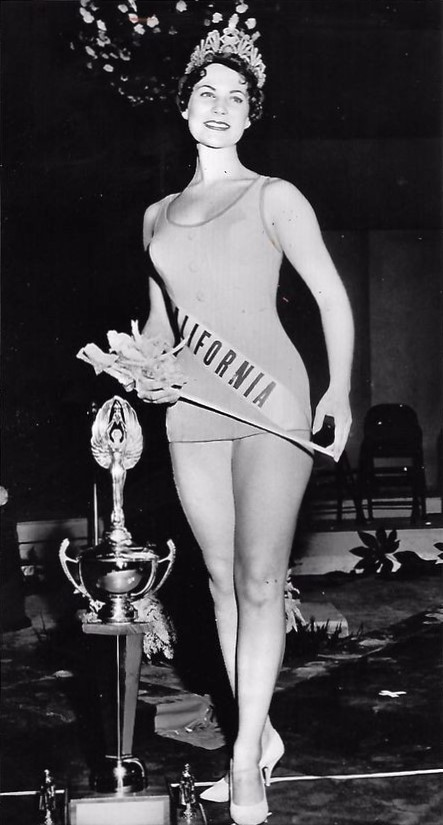
- Huntingdon as Miss California USA 1959
- Born: Terry Lynn Huntingdon; Mount Shasta, California, U.S.
- Education: UCLA
- Spouse: Joseph Tydings (m. 1975; div. 1988)
- Children: Paige Crowly; Alexandra Tydings
- Beauty pageant titleholder
- Title: Miss California USA 1959; Miss USA 1959
- Major competitions: Miss California USA 1959; (Winner); Miss USA 1959; (Winner); Miss Universe 1959; (2nd Runner-Up)

Terry Lynn Huntingdon is an American actress and beauty pageant titleholder who was crowned Miss USA 1959. She represented the United States at Miss Universe 1959, where as finished 2nd Runner-Up.

== Early years ==
Huntingdon comes from a family of five-generation Californians. She attended Mt. Shasta High School, where she was a majorette and went from there to the University of California, Los Angeles, where she majored in dance.

== Beauty contests ==
One of Huntingdon's first beauty pageant titles was Miss Mount Shasta in 1954–1955.

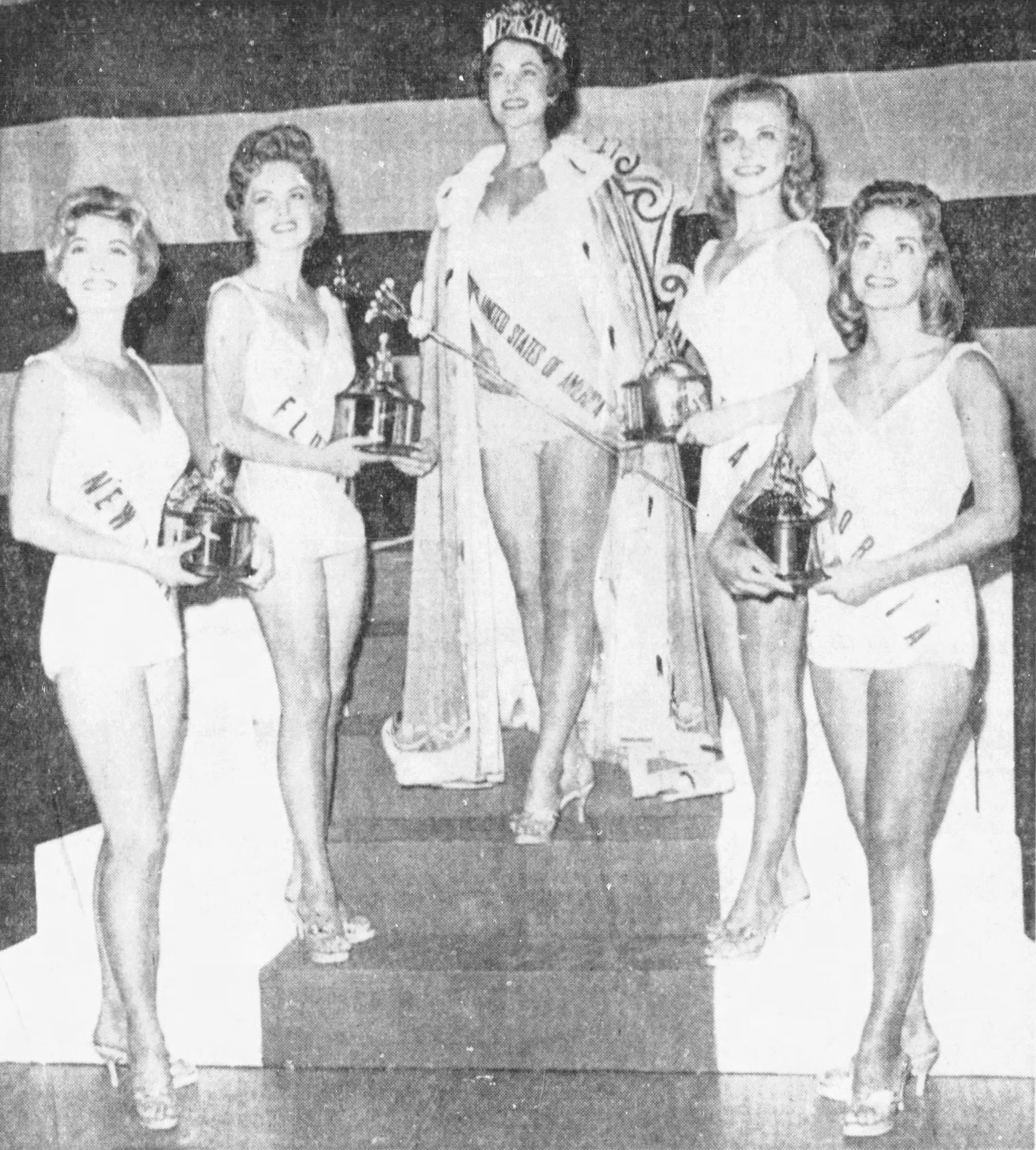
Huntingdon (center) as Miss USA 1959, with runners-up (from left) Arlene Nesbitt, Nanita Greene, Carelgean Douglas, and Dorothy Gladys Taylor

After winning the Miss California USA crown, Huntingdon went on to become California's first representative to achieve the title of Miss USA. She was the first Miss USA to win the title at a pageant held in her home state.

She was second runner-up in the Miss Universe 1959 pageant.

== Acting ==
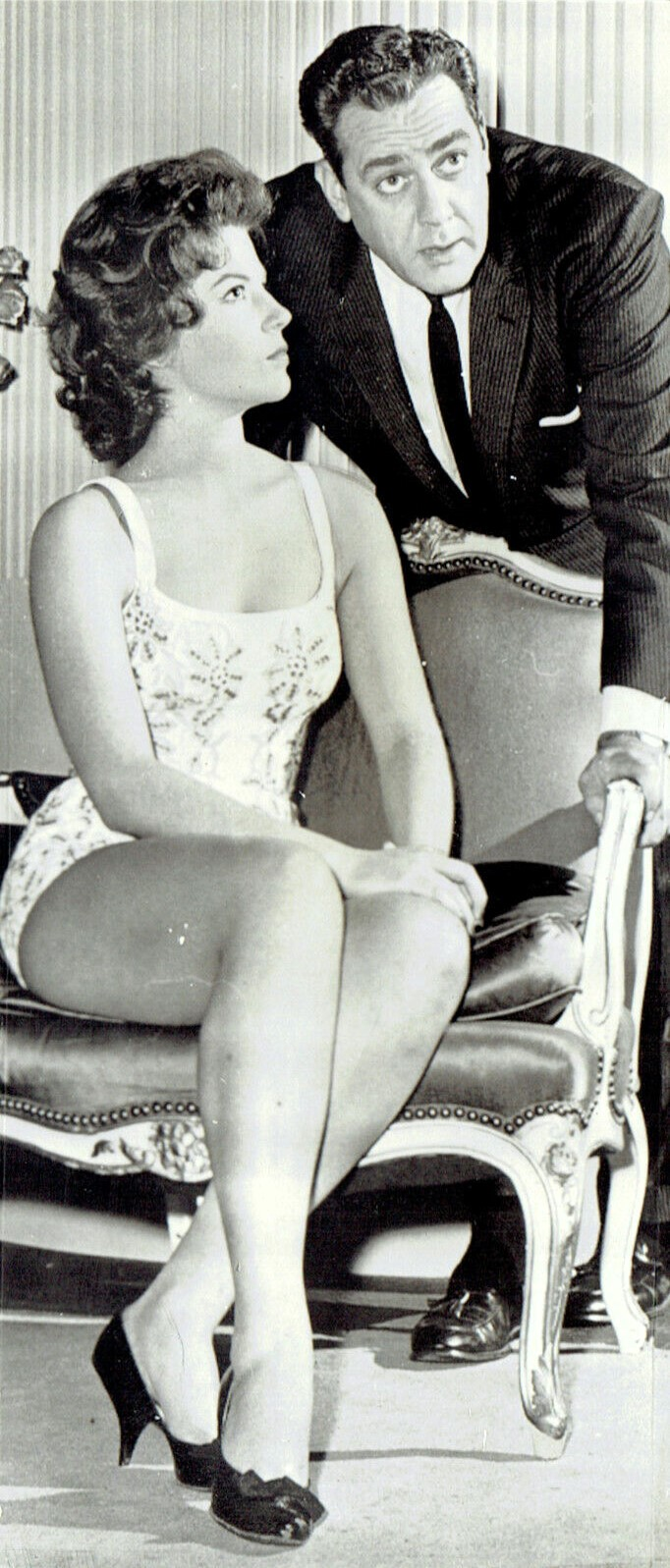
Huntingdon (left), with Raymond Burr in a 1959 press photo promoting her Perry Mason episode

Huntingdon made occasional television and film appearances. In her first television role in 1959 she appeared on Perry Mason as defendant Kitty Wynne in "The Case of the Bartered Bikini." She was a contestant on the television quiz show You Bet Your Life, hosted by Groucho Marx, in 1960. She also appeared as Hecuba in the Three Stooges feature film The Three Stooges Meet Hercules.

== Paternity suit ==
Huntingdon was involved in a paternity suit in 1963 when attorney Arthur Crowley denied being the father of her daughter, who was then a year old. In 1965, California's 2nd District Court of Appeal reversed the Superior Court's verdict, which went in Crowley's favor, and ordered a new trial. In 1966, the California Supreme Court reversed the verdict in which Crowley was absolved, and it ordered a new trial.

== Other activities ==
After leaving acting, Huntingdon worked in a variety of jobs including being a production manager for a women's clothing business, modeling, working in the office of U.S. Senator Alan Cranston, and being a photographer for the Office of Economic Opportunity in the early 1970s.

In 1980, she was appointed to the board of Women's National Bank.

== Personal life ==
On April 19, 1975, Huntingdon married former U.S. Senator Joseph Tydings of Maryland, with whom she had one daughter, actress Alexandra Tydings. They divorced in 1988.

== Filmography ==
Film and television
Year	Title	Role	Notes
1959	Miss USA 1959	Herself	Winner - Contestant/Representing California State.
1959	Miss Universe 1959	Herself	2nd Runner-up - Contestant/Representing USA.
1959	Perry Mason	Kitty Wynne	Episode: "The Case of the Bartered Bikini"
1960	The Untouchables	Flo Ingalls	Episode: "The Waxey Gordon Story"
1960	The Law and Mr. Jones	Model	Episode: "No sale"
1961	The Adventures of Ozzie & Harriet	Joyce	Episode: "The Chaperone"
1962	The Three Stooges Meet Hercules	Hecuba	Film debut
1962	Five Finger Exercise	Helen	

== Published works ==
- "California Girl: Miss USA 1959"
