= Khin Myint Myint =

Burmese businessperson and beauty pageant titleholder (1944–2009)

Khin Khin Myint
- ခင်မြင့်မြင့်
- Born: 1944; Daik-U Township, Myanmar
- Died: September 19, 2009 (aged 64–65)
- Occupations: Businesswoman, philanthropist
- Spouse: Myat Thin Aung
- Children: 6
- Beauty pageant titleholder
- Title: Miss Burma 1961
- Major competitions: Miss Burmar 1961 (Winner); Miss Universe 1961 (Unplaced)

Khin Myint Myint (Burmese: ခင်မြင့်မြင့်; 1944–19 September 2009) was a Burmese beauty pageant titleholder, businesswoman and philanthropist. She was president of the Myanmar Women Entrepreneurs Association. She was crowned Miss Burma 1961 and represented her country at Miss Universe 1961.

== Early life ==
Khin Myint Myint was born in the Daik-U Township, Bago Division in 1944, and attended Myoma High School, where she distinguished herself in throwing sports.

== Career ==
At age 17, Khin Myint Myint won the Miss Burma beauty pageant in 1961 and represented her country at the Miss Universe event held at Miami Beach, Florida. Later she became a businessperson and established a name for herself in the food industry. Also known for her philanthropy, she reportedly donated more than Ks.300 million for humanitarian causes which earned her the Agga Maha Thiri Thudhamma Theingi title.

In 2008, Khin Myint Myint received the ASEAN Award of the Vietnam Chamber of Commerce and Industry. She was the president of Myanmar Women Entrepreneurs Association and vice-chairperson of AA Medical Products.

== Personal life ==
Khin Myint Myint was married to Myat Thin Aung. Together the couple had six children. She died on 19 September 2009 from a heart attack; she was 65.
