= Miss Universe 1960 =

9th Miss Universe pageant

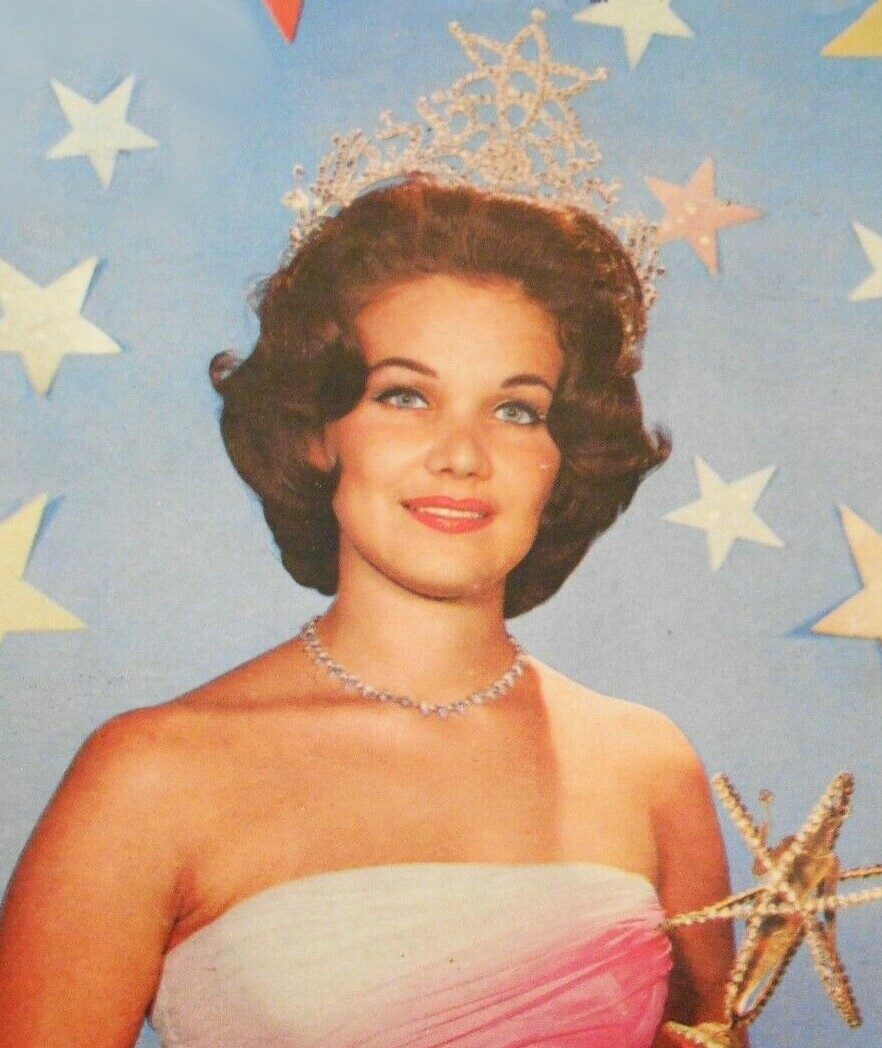
- Linda Bement
- Date: 7 July 1960
- Presenters: Charles Collingwood
- Venue: Miami Beach Auditorium, Miami Beach, Florida, United States
- Broadcaster: CBS
- Entrants: 43
- Placements: 15
- Debuts: Jordan; Portugal; Spain; Tunisia
- Withdrawals: Guatemala; Hawaii; Mexico; Poland; Thailand; Turkey
- Returns: Chile; Finland; Hong Kong; Lebanon; Morocco; New Zealand; Paraguay; South Africa; Suriname; Switzerland; Venezuela
- Winner: Linda Bement; United States
- Congeniality: Myint Myint May (Burma)
- Photogenic: Daniela Bianchi (Italy)

Miss Universe 1960 was the ninth Miss Universe pageant, held at the Miami Beach Auditorium in Miami Beach, Florida, on 9 July 1960.

At the end of the event, Akiko Kojima of Japan crowned Linda Bement of the United States as Miss Universe 1960. Bement was the third representative of the United States to win the contest.

Contestants from forty-three countries and territories competed in this year's pageant. The pageant was hosted by Charles Collingwood.

== Background ==
=== Selection of participants ===
Contestants from forty-three countries and territories were selected to compete in the pageant. Two contestants were appointees to their national titles and two other were selected to replace the original dethroned winner. (Note: Mary Quiróz, Miss Yaracuy 1957, was appointed as the representative of Venezuela at Miss Universe as the Miss Venezuela pageant was held weeks after Miss Universe.)

==== Replacements ====
Sonja Menzel was originally set to represent Denmark but withdrew for undisclosed reasons, and was replaced by Lizzie Hess.

Miss Luxembourg 1960, Liliane Müller, was also set to represent Luxembourg at the pageant, but was replaced by Miss Elegance Josée Venturi for undisclosed reasons.

==== Debuts, returns, and withdrawals ====
This edition saw the debuts of Jordan, Portugal, Spain, and Tunisia, and the returns of Chile, Finland, Hong Kong, Lebanon, Morocco, New Zealand, Paraguay, South Africa, Suriname, Switzerland, and Venezuela. South Africa and Switzerland, which last competed in 1953, Hong Kong and New Zealand in 1954, Finland and Lebanon in 1955, Morocco in 1957, while the others last competed in 1958.

Hawaii withdrew after becoming a U.S. state on 21 August 1959, resulting in the Miss Hawaii Universe pageant being downgraded from a national Miss Universe qualifier to a Miss USA state pageant.

Lorena Velázquez of Mexico withdrew for personal reasons. Marzena Malinowska of Poland withdrew to compete in another international pageant. Miss Turkey 1959, Figen Özgür, was replaced by Miss Turkey 1960, Nebahat Çehre, who also withdrew and later competed at Miss World 1960 instead. Guatemala, and Thailand withdrew after their respective organizations failed to hold a national competition or appoint a delegate.

Julienne Ayissi Eyenga Fouda of Cameroon was disqualified for being underage and replaced by Sale Assouen, who subsequently withdrew for undisclosed reasons. Cluadinette Fouchard of Haiti withdrew due to marriage plans. Madagascar and Martinique intended to participate but did not appear.

== Results ==
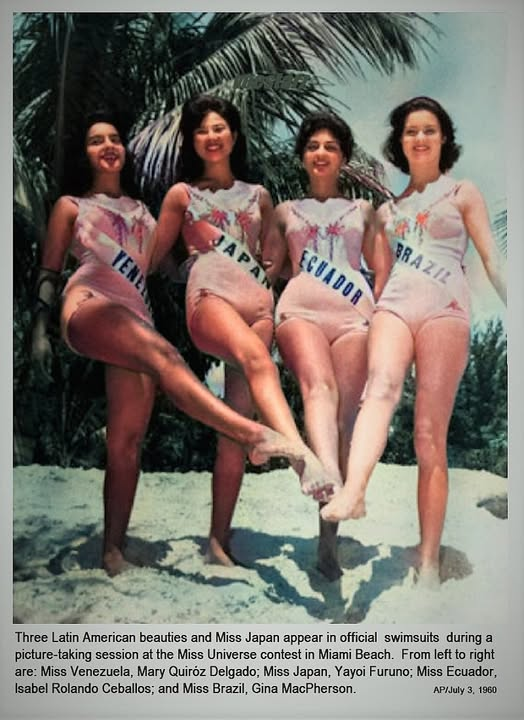
Contestants from Venezuela, Japan, Ecuador and Brazil during the swimsuit parade.

=== Placements ===
Placement	Contestant
Miss Universe 1960	United States – Linda Bement
1st Runner-Up	Italy – Daniela Bianchi
2nd Runner-Up	Austria – Elizabeth Hodacs
3rd Runner-Up	South Africa – Nicolette Caras
4th Runner-Up	Spain – Teresa del Río
Top 15	Brazil – Gina MacPherson; Colombia – Stella Márquez; England – Joan Boardman; Greece – Magda Passaloglou; Israel – Aliza Gur; Japan – Yayoi Furuno; Norway – Ragnhild Aass; South Korea – Miheeja Sohn; Switzerland – Eliane Maurath; West Germany – Ingrun Möckel

=== Special awards ===
Award	Contestant
Miss Amity	Burma – Myint Myint May; Louisiana – Judy Fletcher
Miss Photogenic	Italy – Daniela Bianchi

== Pageant ==
=== Format ===
Same with 1955, fifteen semi-finalists were chosen at the preliminary competition that consists of the swimsuit and evening gown competition. Each of the fifteen semi-finalists gave a short speech during the final telecast using their native languages. Afterwards, the fifteen semi-finalists paraded again in their swimsuits and evening gowns, and the five finalists were eventually chosen.

=== Selection committee ===
- Maxwell Arnow – American film producer
- Fernando Botero – Colombian painter and sculptor
- Jane Fisher – Wife of American businessman and philanthropist, Max Fisher
- Irwin Hasen – American cartoonist
- Dr. M.M. Hollander – American physician and cosmetic specialist
- Russell Patterson – American cartoonist
- Vuk Vuchinich – Yugoslavian-American painter and sculptor
- Miyoko Yanagita – Japanese fashion designer
- Roger Zeiler – An official from the Mondial Events Organization through the Miss Europe Committee

== Contestants ==
Forty-three contestants competed for the title.

Country/Territory	Contestant	Age (Note: Ages at the time of the pageant)	Hometown
Argentina	Rose Marie Lincke	22	Buenos Aires
Austria	Elizabeth Hodacs	18	Vienna
Belgium	Huberte Box	19	Brussels
Bolivia	Nancy Aguirre	19	La Paz
Brazil	Gina MacPherson	19	Guanabara
Burma	Myint Myint May	18	Rangoon
Canada	Edna McVicar	19	Galt
Chile	Marinka Polhammer	19	Santiago
Colombia	Stella Márquez	21	Pasto
Costa Rica	Leila Rodríguez	18	San José
Cuba	Flora Lauten	18	Havana
Denmark	Lizzie Hess	20	Copenhagen
Ecuador	Isabel Rolando	21	Quito
England	Joan Boardman	22	Wallasey
Finland	Maija-Leena Manninen	21	Helsinki
France	Florence Eyrie	21	Paris
Greece	Magda Passaloglou	24	Athens
Holland	Carina Verbeek	19	The Hague
Hong Kong	Vivian Cheung	20	Hong Kong
Iceland	Svanhildur Jakobsdóttir	19	Reykjavík
Israel	Aliza Gur	19	Haifa
Italy	Daniela Bianchi	18	Rome
Japan	Yayoi Furuno	19	Fukuoka
Jordan	Helen Giatanapoulus	19	Amman
Lebanon	Gladys Tabet	18	Beirut
Luxembourg	Josée Venturi	21	Luxembourg City
Morocco	Marilyn Escobar	19	Rabat
New Zealand	Lorraine Jones	21	Wellington
Norway	Ragnhild Aass	19	Oslo
Paraguay	Mercedes Ruggia	22	Asunción
Peru	Medallit Gallino	19	Lambayeque
Portugal	Maria Teresa Cardoso	19	Lisbon
South Africa	Nicolette Caras	19	Johannesburg
South Korea	Miheeja Sohn	19	Seoul
Spain	Teresa del Río	21	Madrid
Suriname	Christine Jie Sam Foek	21	Paramaribo
Sweden	Birgitta Öfling	22	Uppsala
Switzerland	Eliane Maurath	19	Geneva
Tunisia	Marie-Louise Carrigues	21	Tunis
United States	Linda Bement	18	Salt Lake City
Uruguay	Iris Ubal	22	Montevideo
Venezuela	Mary Quiróz	21	Caracas
West Germany	Ingrun Möckel	18	Düsseldorf
