= Akiko Kojima =

Japanese model and beauty queen (born 1936)

- 児島 明子
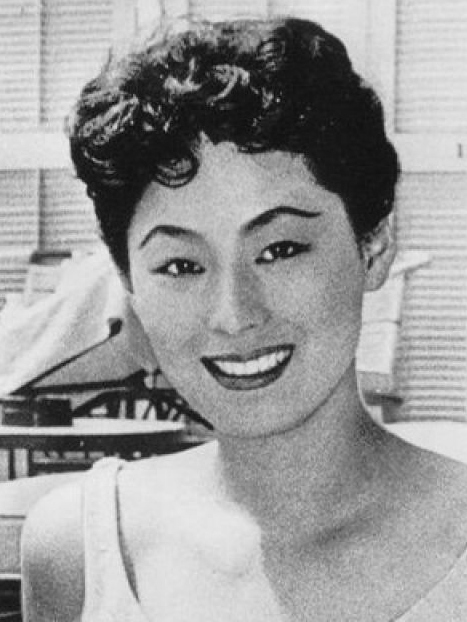
- Kojima in 1959
- Born: October 29, 1936 (age 89); Tokyo, Japan
- Height: 1.68 m (5 ft 6 in)
- Spouse: Akira Takarada (m. 1966; div. 1984)
- Children: 3, including Michiru Kojima (daughter)
- Beauty pageant titleholder
- Title: Miss Japan 1959; Miss Universe 1959
- Hair color: black
- Eye color: brown
- Major competitions: Miss Japan 1959 (Winner); Miss Universe 1959 (Winner)

Akiko Kojima (児島 明子, Kojima Akiko; born October 29, 1936) is a Japanese model and beauty queen. She was crowned Miss Universe 1959, making her the first Japanese and Asian woman to win the title, as well as the first Asian person to win a major beauty pageant title.

== Biography ==
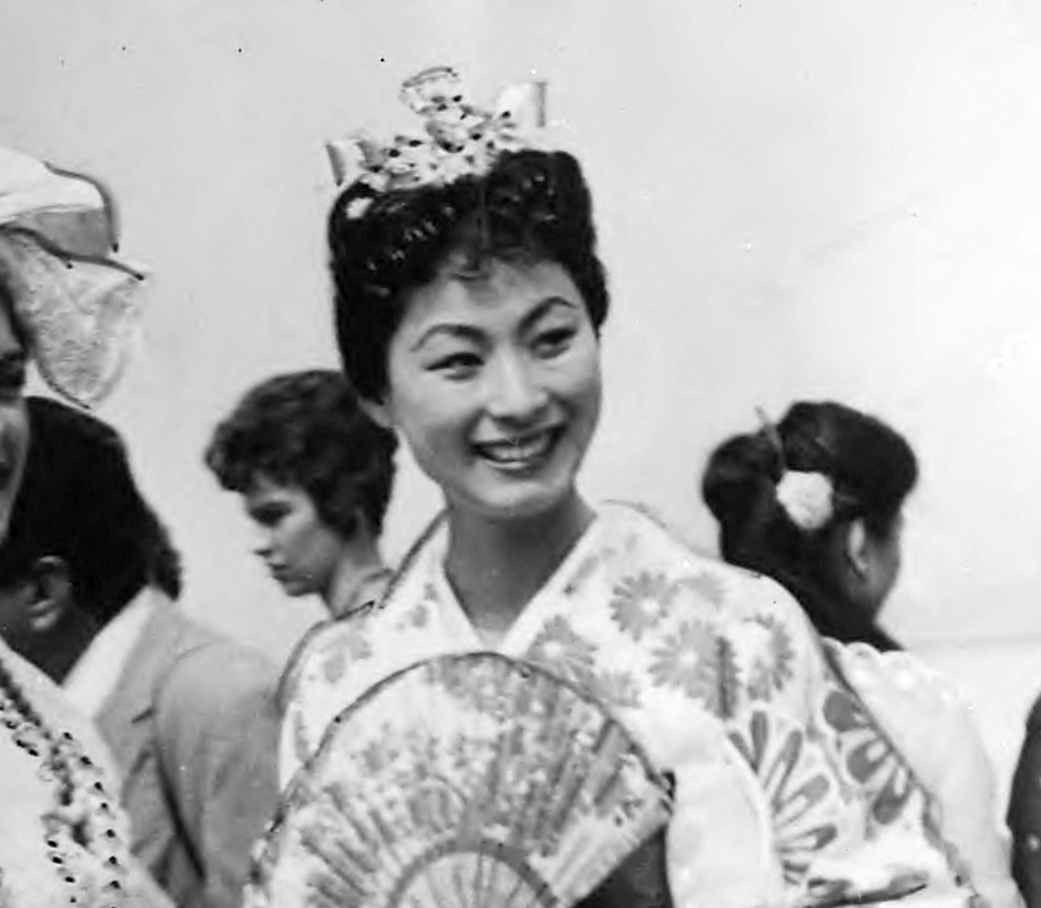
Akiko Kojima, Miss Universe 1959

Kojima was a 22-year-old model from Tokyo, Japan, when she won over four other finalists from Norway, the U.S., England, and Brazil for the 1959 Miss Universe crown in Long Beach, California. At 5 ft 6 in (167.6 cm), Akiko measured 37–23–38 inches (94.0–58.4–96.5 cm). She denied press reports on having undergone breast surgery. A year later, Akiko crowned Linda Bement from the United States in 1960.

In 1966, Kojima was married to Japanese actor Akira Takarada, who rose to fame in the Toho movie studios doing the Godzilla movies since 1954. Kojima settled into a quiet married life. They later had a daughter, Michiru Kojima, in 1967 and two sons. They divorced in 1984, and Kojima left with their daughter and sons.

Forty eight years later after her reign, Japanese Riyo Mori won the Miss Universe pageant in 2007.

Awards and achievements
Preceded by (Colombia) Luz Marina Zuluaga †	Miss Universe; 1959	Succeeded by (United States) Linda Bement
Preceded by Tomoko Moritake	Miss Japan; 1959	Succeeded by Yayoi Foruno
