= Miss World 1960 =

10th Miss World pageant

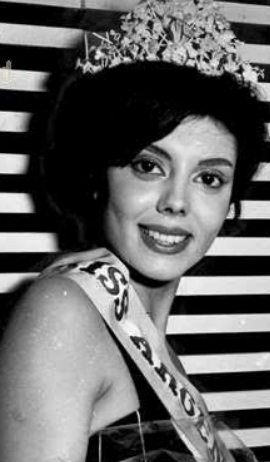
- Norma Cappagli
- Date: 8 November 1960
- Presenters: Bob Hope; Peter West
- Venue: Lyceum Ballroom, London, United Kingdom
- Broadcaster: BBC
- Entrants: 39
- Placements: 18
- Debuts: Bolivia; Burma; Cyprus; Ecuador; French Polynesia; Kenya; Lebanon; Madagascar; Nicaragua; Spain; Tanganyika
- Withdrawals: Austria; Ghana; Gibraltar; Hawaii; Honduras; Hong Kong; Jamaica; Paraguay; Peru; Portugal; Puerto Rico
- Returns: Australia; Turkey
- Winner: Norma Cappagli; Argentina

Miss World 1960 was the 10th edition of the Miss World pageant, held at the Lyceum Ballroom, London, United Kingdom, on 8 November 1960.

At the conclusion of the event, racing driver Stirling Moss, one of the judges, crowned Norma Cappagli of Argentina as Miss World 1960. This is the first victory of Argentina in the history of the pageant.

Contestants from thirty-nine countries and territories participated in this year's pageant. The pageant was hosted by Bob Hope, while Peter West provided commentary all throughout the competition.

== Background ==
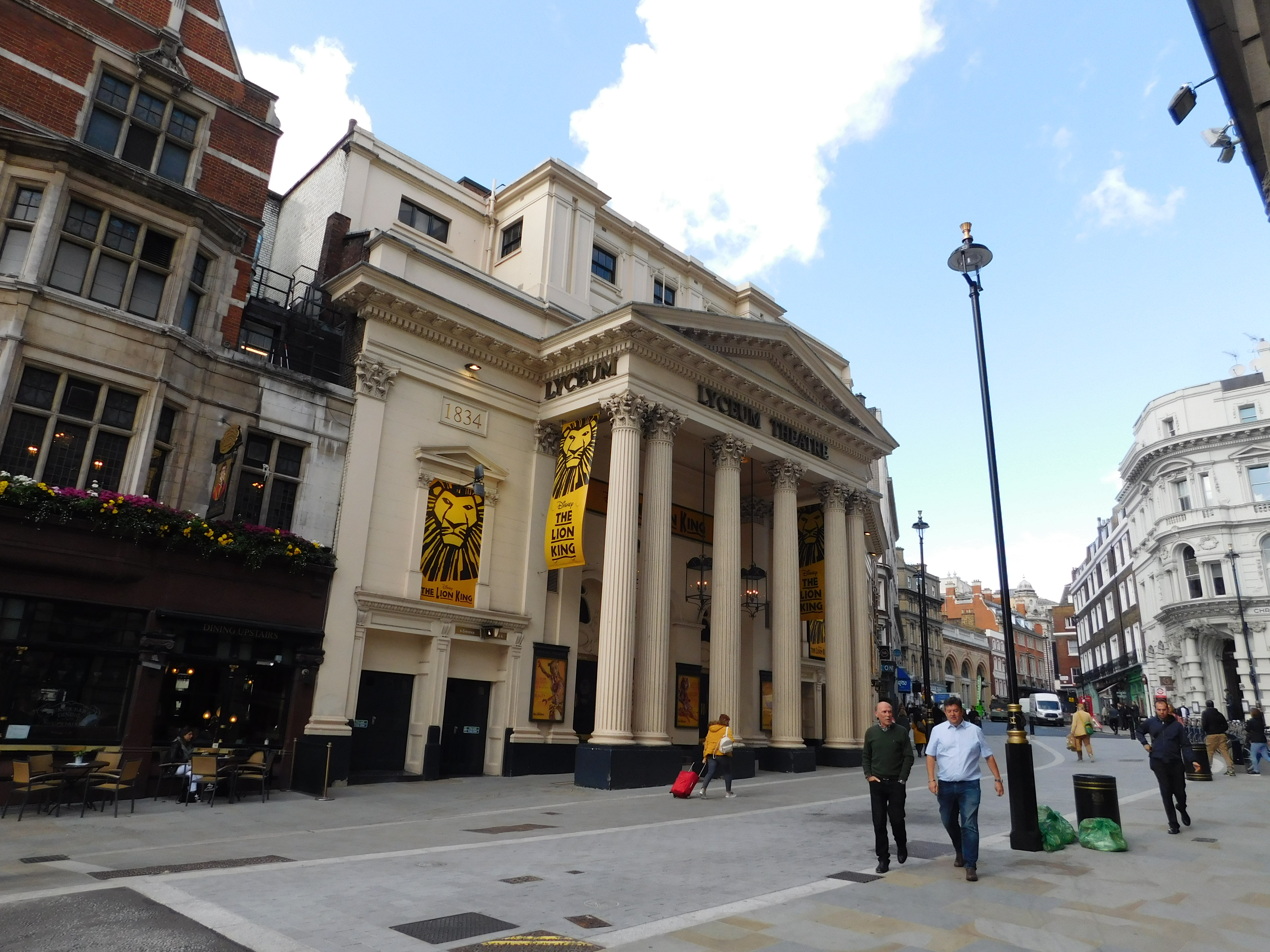
Lyceum Ballroom, venue of Miss World 1960

=== Selection of participants ===
Thirty-nine contestants were selected to compete in the pageant. Three contestants were appointed to represent their countries after being a runner-up in their national pageants.

==== Replacements ====
Diane Medina was appointed to represent France after Yolanda Biecosai withdrew from the competition for undisclosed reasons. The first runner-up of Miss United States 1960, Judith Ann Achter, was appointed to represent her country, after it was discovered that Annette Driggers, the original winner, was married and only fifteen years old. The third runner-up of Miss Holland 1960, Carina Verbeek, was appointed to represent her country, as Miss Holland 1960, Ans Schoon, was abroad when the registration forms arrived.

==== Debuts, returns and withdrawals ====
This edition marked the debut of Bolivia, Burma, Cyprus, Ecuador, French Polynesia, (Note: Competed as Tahiti in the pageant) Kenya, Lebanon, Madagascar, Nicaragua, Spain, and Tanganyika, and the return of Australia, which last competed in 1957 and Turkey, last competed in 1958.

Luise Kammermair of Austria chose not to participate in the competition after becoming a runner-up at Miss Europe 1960. Comfort Kwamena of Ghana withdrew after choosing to make her flight to London in August 1960 instead of November of the same year. Judith Willoughby of Jamaica, Lena Woo of Hong Kong, Mercedes Ruggia of Paraguay, Maricruz Gómez of Peru, and Maria Josebate Silva Santos of Portugal withdrew for undisclosed reasons. Gibraltar and Puerto Rico withdrew after their respective organizations failed to hold a national competition or appoint a delegate.

Marinka Polhammer of Chile, Marilyne Escobar of Morocco, Lorraine Nawa Jones of New Zealand, and Elaine Maurath of Switzerland were all set compete in this edition, but all withdrew for undisclosed reasons.

== Results ==
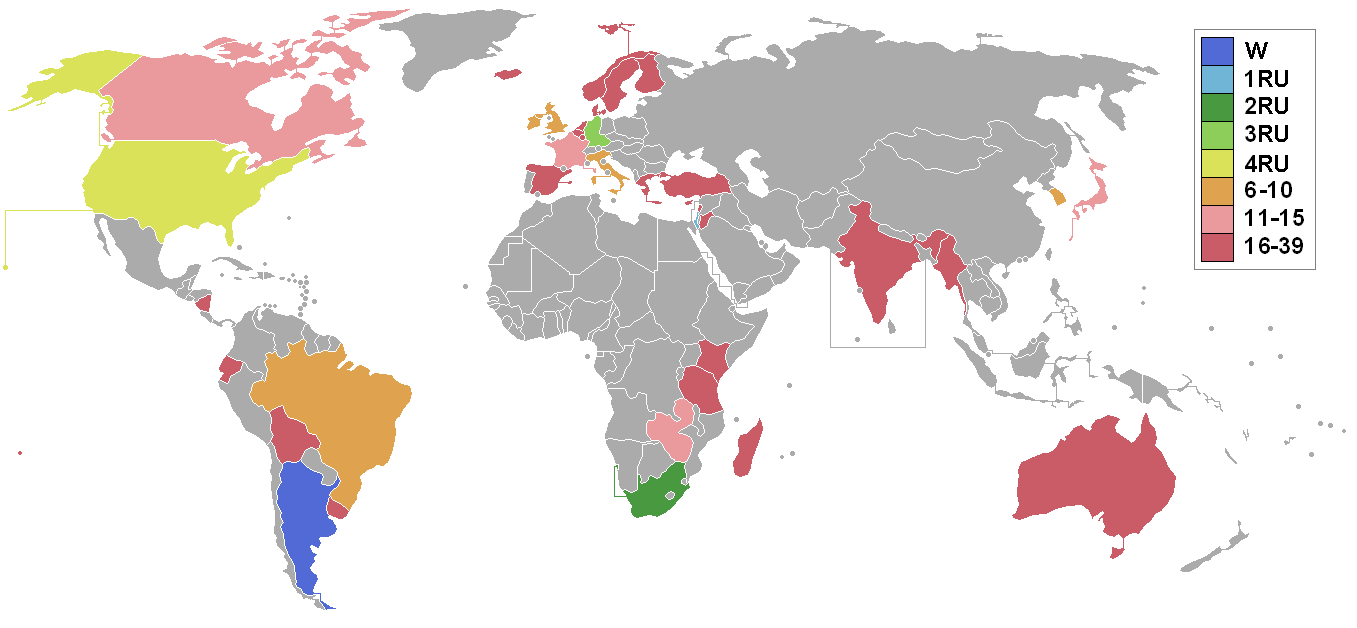
Miss World 1960 participating countries and territories.

=== Placements ===
Placement	Contestant
Miss World 1960	Argentina – Norma Cappagli
1st runner-up	Israel – Gila Golan
2nd runner-up	South Africa – Denise Muir
3rd runner-up	West Germany – Ingrun Helgard Moeckel
4th runner-up	United States – Judith Ann Achter
Top 10	Brazil – Maria Edilene Torreão; Ireland – Irene Ruth Kane; Italy – Layla Rigazzi; South Korea – Lee Young-hee; United Kingdom – Hilda Fairclough
Top 18	Canada – Danica d'Hondt; Cyprus – Mary Mavropoulos; Denmark – Lise Bodin; India – Iona Pinto; Kenya – Jasmine Batty; Norway – Grethe Solhoy; Rhodesia and Nyasaland – Jenny Lee Scott; Sweden – Barbro Olsson

== Pageant ==
=== Format ===
The number of placements in this edition has been increased to eighteen from eleven in the previous edition. The eighteen semi-finalists were selected through a preliminary competition held on the day of the final competition, consisting of a swimsuit and evening gown competition. The eighteen semifinalists competed in the swimsuit competition, and ten semi-finalists were eventually selected. The ten semi-finalists were interviewed by Bob Russell and paraded in front of the judges, and the five finalists were eventually selected to compete in the final interview.

=== Selection committee ===
- Rajah Gunsekard – Ceylon diplomat
- Oliver Messel – British artist
- Lady F. Asafu-Adjaye – Wife of the Ambassador of Ghana to Great Britain
- Stafford Somerfield – British newspaper editor
- Fredericka Ann "Bobo" Sigrist – Wife of British film producer Kevin McClory
- Stirling Moss – English Formula One racer
- Bernard Delfont – Russian-born British theatrical impresario

== Contestants ==
Thirty-nine contestants competed for the title.

Country	Contestant	Age (Note: Age at the time of the pageant)	Hometown
Argentina	Norma Cappagli	21	Buenos Aires
Australia	Margaret Nott	19	Victoria Harbor
Belgium	Huberte Bax	19	Brussels
Bolivia	Dalia Monasteros	20	La Paz
Brazil	Maria Edilene Torreão	18	São José do Egito
Burma	Ma Sen Aye	24	Yangon
Canada	Danica d'Hondt	21	Vancouver
Cyprus	Mary Mavropoulos	20	Limassol
Denmark	Lise Bodin	19	Copenhagen
Ecuador	Toty Rodríguez	23	Guayaquil
Finland	Margaretha Schauman	18	Helsinki
France	Diane Medina	19	Paris
French Polynesia	Teura Bouwens	27	Teahupo'o
Greece	Kalliopi Geralexi	–	Athens
Holland	Carina Verbeek	19	The Hague
Iceland	Kristín Þorvaldsdóttir	18	Reykjavík
India	Iona Pinto	24	Bombay
Ireland	Irene Ruth Kane	18	Derry
Israel	Gila Golan	20	Tel Aviv
Italy	Layla Rigazzi	18	Milan
Japan	Eiko Murai	24	Niigata
Jordan	Eriny Emile Sebella	22	Amman
Kenya	Jasmine Batty	21	Nairobi
Lebanon	Giséle Naser	21	Beirut
Luxembourg	Liliane Müller	18	Luxembourg City
Madagascar	Rajaobelina Bedovoahangy	24	Antananarivo
Nicaragua	Carmen Isabel Recalde	18	León
Norway	Grethe Solhoy	20	Oslo
Rhodesia and Nyasaland	Jenny Lee Scott	18	Kwekwe
South Africa	Denise Muir	19	Johannesburg
South Korea (Note: Competed as Korea in the pageant)	Lee Young-hee	20	Busan
Spain	Concepción Molinera	23	Barcelona
Sweden	Barbro Olsson	20	Umeå
Tanganyika	Carmen Lesley Woodcock	18	Dar es Salaam
Turkey	Nebahat Çehre	17	Samsun
United Kingdom	Hilda Fairclough	23	Lancashire
United States	Judith Ann Achter	18	St. Louis
Uruguay	Beatriz Benítez	20	Montevideo
West Germany	Ingrun Helgard Moeckel	18	Düsseldorf
