= Miss Universe 1959 =

8th Miss Universe pageant

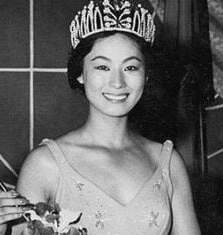
- Akiko Kojima
- Date: 24 July 1959
- Presenters: Byron Palmer
- Venue: Long Beach Municipal Auditorium, Long Beach, California, United States
- Broadcaster: CBS
- Entrants: 34
- Placements: 15
- Debuts: Bolivia; Burma; Luxembourg
- Withdrawals: Alaska; Australia; British Guiana; Chile; Paraguay; Singapore; Suriname; Venezuela; West Indies
- Returns: Austria; Costa Rica; Iceland; Thailand; Turkey
- Winner: Akiko Kojima; Japan
- Congeniality: Sodsai Vanijvadhana (Thailand)
- Photogenic: Pamela Searle (England)

Miss Universe 1959 was the eighth Miss Universe pageant, held at the Long Beach Municipal Auditorium in Long Beach, California, on 24 July 1959. This was the last year that the pageant was held in Long Beach, before moving to Miami Beach, Florida in 1960.

At the conclusion of the event, Luz Marina Zuluaga of Colombia crowned Akiko Kojima of Japan as Miss Universe 1959. Kojima was the first representative of Japan, and the first Asian woman to win the contest.

Contestants from thirty-four countries and territories competed in this year's pageant. The pageant was hosted by Byron Palmer.

== Background ==
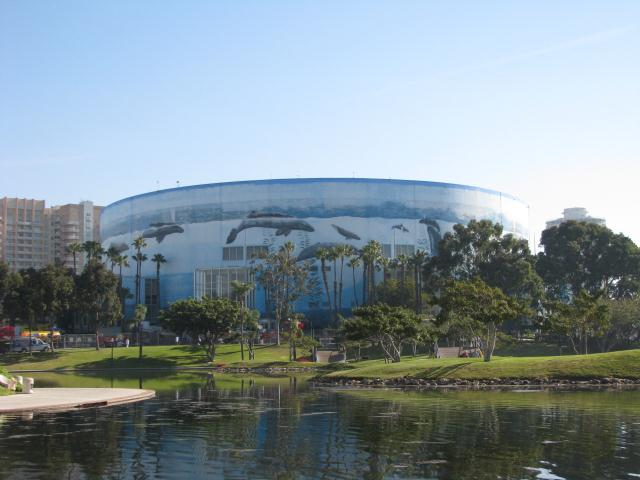
Long Beach Municipal Auditorium, the venue of Miss Universe 1959

=== Selection of participants ===
Contestants from thirty-four countries and territories were selected to compete in the pageant.

==== Debuts, returns, and withdrawals ====
This edition saw the debuts of Bolivia, Burma, and Luxembourg, and the returns of Austria, Costa Rica, Iceland, Thailand, and Turkey. Thailand last competed in 1954, while Austria, Costa Rica, Iceland, and Turkey last competed in 1957. Australia, the British Guiana, Chile, Paraguay, Singapore, Suriname, Venezuela, and the West Indies withdrew after their respective organizations failed to hold a national competition or appoint a delegate. Alaska withdrew due to the former Territory of Alaska becoming a state of the United States and was thus demoted from a Miss Universe national pageant to a Miss USA state pageant.

Christine Matias of the Philippines was set to compete at Miss Universe, but was barred by her university, the Philippine Women's University, as they do not allow their students to wear a swimsuit in front of the public. Aida Kadamani was supposed to represent the United Arab Republic at Miss Universe, but withdrew after refusing to wear a swimsuit in front of the judges. She was then replaced by Nawal Ramli, but she also did not push through with the competition as the pageant organizers failed to answer her queries whether she could substitute Kadamani. Indonesia was supposed to compete for the first time, but was not able to send a candidate due to protests in Jakarta against the creation of Miss Indonesia. Other countries who would not sanction their people to appear in swimsuits according to Oscar Reinhardt, then-executive producer of Miss Universe Inc., include Ireland, Portugal, and Spain. Spain and Portugal would send their first representatives in the following year.

== Results ==
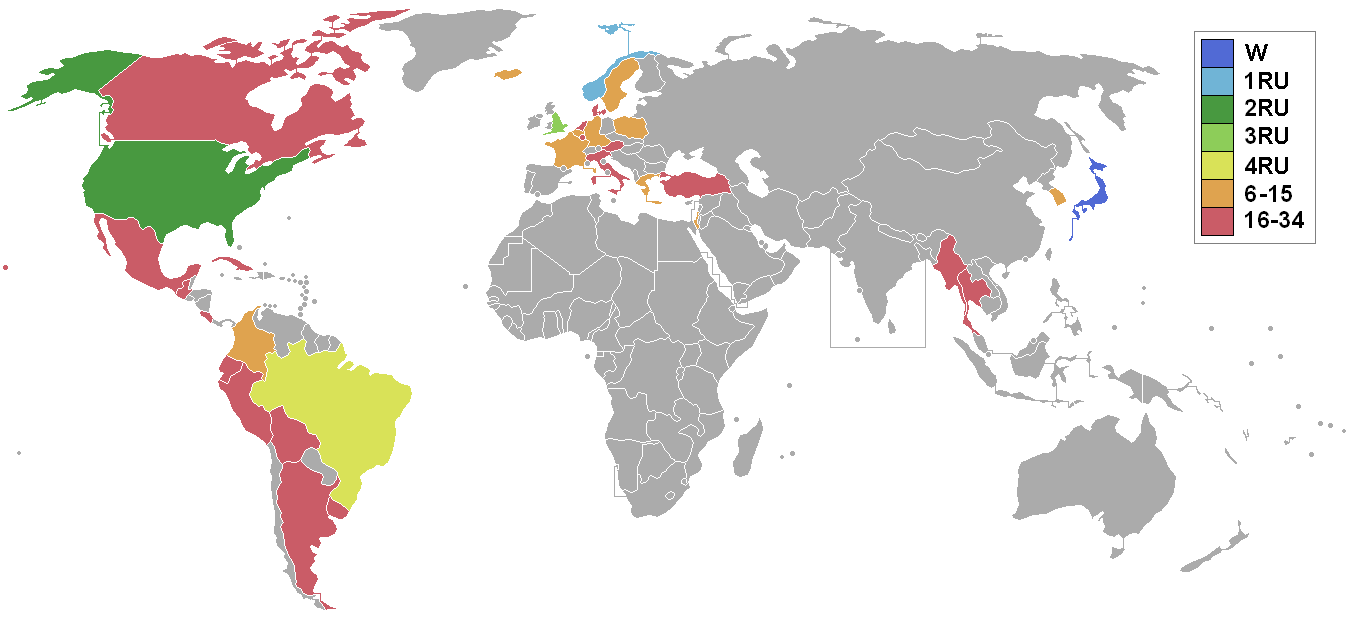
Miss Universe 1959 participating countries and territories

=== Placements ===
Placement	Contestant
Miss Universe 1959	Japan – Akiko Kojima
1st Runner-Up	Norway – Jorunn Kristjansen
2nd Runner-Up	United States – Terry Huntingdon
3rd Runner-Up	England – Pamela Searle
4th Runner-Up	Brazil – Vera Ribeiro
Top 15	Belgium – Hélène Savigny; Colombia – Olga Pumarejo; France – Françoise Saint-Laurent; Greece – Zoitsa Kouroukli; Iceland – Sigríður Þorvaldsdóttir; Israel – Rina Issacov; Poland – Zuzanna Cembrowska; South Korea – Hyun-joo Oh; Sweden – Marie Ekström; West Germany – Carmela Künzel

=== Special awards ===
Award	Contestant
Miss Friendship	Thailand – Sodsai Vanijvadhana
Miss Photogenic	England – Pamela Searle
Miss Popular Girl	South Korea – Hyun-joo Oh

== Pageant ==
=== Format ===
Same with 1955, fifteen semi-finalists were chosen at the preliminary competition that consists of the swimsuit and evening gown competition. Each of the fifteen semi-finalists gave a short speech during the final telecast using their native languages. Afterwards, the fifteen semi-finalists paraded again in their swimsuits and evening gowns, and the five finalists were eventually chosen.

=== Selection committee ===
- Maxwell Arnow – American director
- Claude Berr – French director, writer, producer, actor and film distributor
- Ghislaine R. de Amador – Ecuadorian judge
- Vion Papamichalis - film producer
- Joseph Ruttemberg - Ukrainian-American photojournalist and cinematographer
- Vincent Trotta – American artist
- Paul Wellmann - American journalist

== Contestants ==
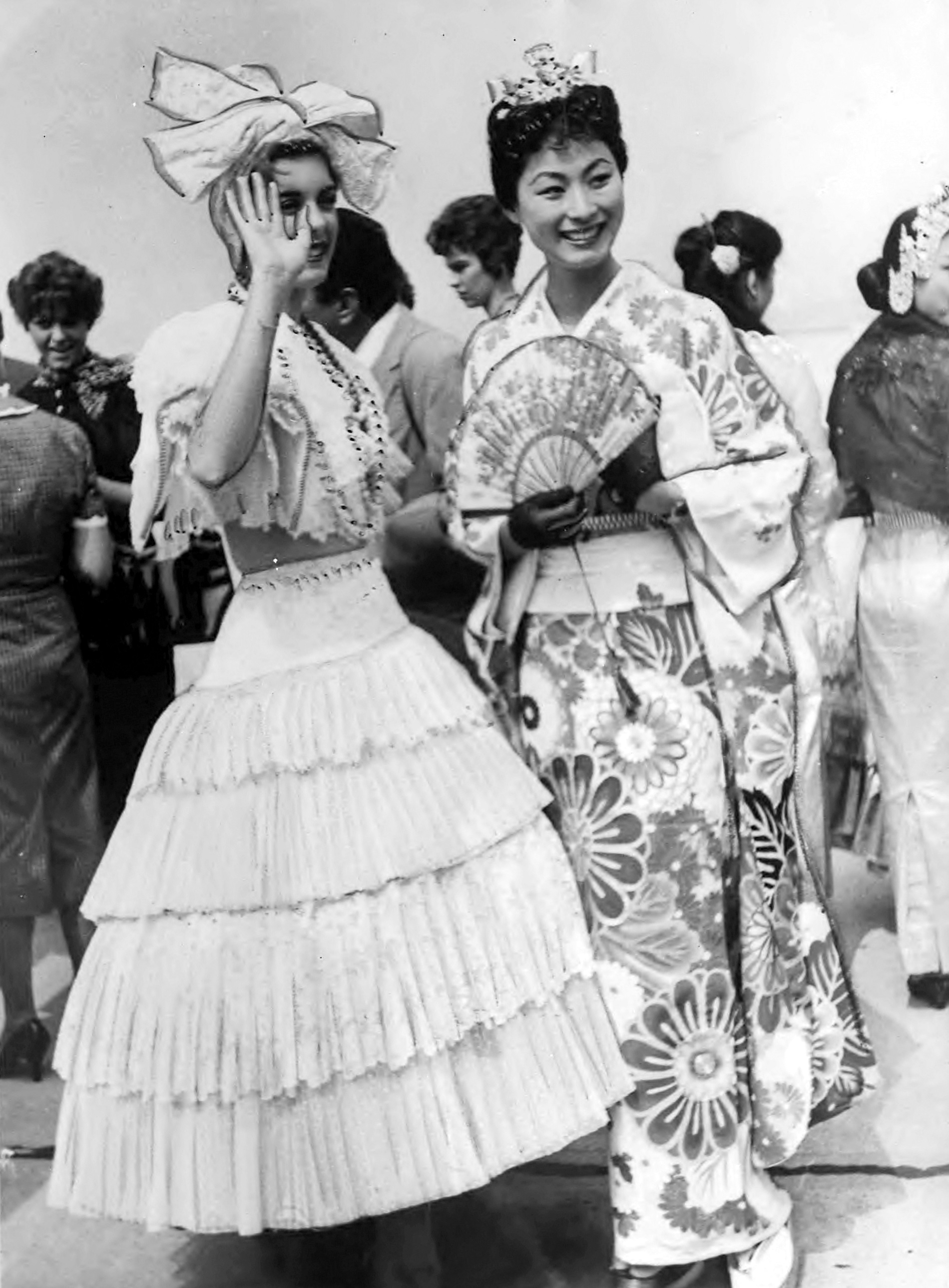
Miss Brazil 1959 Vera Ribeiro and Miss Japan 1959 Akiko Kojima during the national costume parade in Miami Beach, Florida.

Thirty-four contestants competed for the title.

Country/Territory	Contestant	Age (Note: Ages at the time of the pageant)	Hometown
Argentina	Liana Cortijo	20	Buenos Aires
Austria	Christine Spatzier	19	Vienna
Belgium	Hélène Savigny	24	Brussels
Bolivia	Corina Taborga	19	La Paz
Brazil	Vera Ribeiro	19	Rio de Janeiro
Burma	Than Than Aye	19	Rangoon
Canada	Eileen Butter	25	Ancaster
Colombia	Olga Pumarejo	20	Barranquilla
Costa Rica	Zianne Monturiol	20	Heredia
Cuba	Irma Buesa	19	Havana
Denmark	Lisa Stolberg	18	Copenhagen
Ecuador	Carlota Ayala	19	Guayaquil
England	Pamela Searle	21	Surrey
France	Françoise Saint-Laurent	18	Neuilly-Plaisance
Greece	Zoitsa Kouroukli	18	Athens
Guatemala	Rogelia Cruz	18	Guatemala City
Hawaii	Patricia Visser	21	Honolulu
Holland	Peggy Erwich	22	Rotterdam
Iceland	Sigríður Þorvaldsdóttir	18	Reykjavík
Israel	Rina Issacov	19	Tel Aviv
Italy	Maria Buccella	18	Trento
Japan	Akiko Kojima	22	Tokyo
Luxembourg	Josée Pundel	19	Grevenmacher
Mexico	Mirna García Dávila	18	Mexico City
Norway	Jorunn Kristjansen	18	Moss
Peru	Guadalupe Hawkins	18	Callao
Poland	Zuzanna Cembrowska	19	Warsaw
South Korea	Hyun-joo Oh	19	Seoul
Sweden	Marie Ekström	20	Sundsvall
Thailand	Sodsai Vanijvadhana	22	Phra Nakhon
Turkey	Ezel Olcay	19	Istanbul
United States	Terry Huntingdon	19	Mount Shasta
Uruguay	Claudia Bernat	20	Montevideo
West Germany	Carmela Künzel	19	Berlin
