= Cheslie Kryst =

American television correspondent, model, Miss USA 2019 (1991–2022)

- Kryst as Miss USA 2019
- Born: Cheslie Corrinne Kryst; April 28, 1991; Jackson, Michigan, U.S.
- Died: January 30, 2022 (aged 30); New York City, U.S.
- Cause of death: Suicide by jumping
- Education: University of South Carolina (BS); Wake Forest University (JD; MBA)
- Beauty pageant titleholder
- Title: Miss North Carolina USA 2019; Miss USA 2019
- Major competitions: Miss North Carolina USA 2019; (Winner); Miss USA 2019; (Winner); Miss Universe 2019; (Top 10)
- Website: whitecollarglam.com

Cheslie Corrinne Kryst (/krɪst/; April 28, 1991 – January 30, 2022) was an American television correspondent, model, and beauty pageant titleholder. She was also an attorney and a correspondent for the TV show Extra from October 2019 until her death. For her work on Extra, she was nominated for two Daytime Emmy Awards. As Miss USA 2019, Kryst represented the United States at Miss Universe 2019, where she placed in the Top 10. She was the third woman from North Carolina to win Miss USA.

== Early life and education ==
Cheslie Corrinne Kryst was born on April 28, 1991, in Jackson, Michigan, to an African-American mother and a Polish-American father. She had four brothers and a sister. Her mother, April Simpkins, competed in pageantry and was crowned Mrs. North Carolina US when Kryst was a child. The family moved from Michigan to Charlotte, North Carolina, when Kryst was young, and later settled in Rock Hill, South Carolina, where Kryst attended Northwestern High School. The family later moved to Fort Mill, South Carolina, with Kryst transferring to Fort Mill High School, and graduating in 2009; both cities are suburbs in the Charlotte metropolitan area.

After high school, Kryst moved to Columbia, South Carolina, and attended the Honors College at the University of South Carolina. She graduated cum laude from the Darla Moore School of Business with a degree in marketing and human resource management in 2013. She was also a member of the Alpha Lambda Delta honor society, Gamecocks women's track and field team, and the mock trial.

After finishing her undergraduate degree, Kryst enrolled in Wake Forest University School of Law in Winston-Salem, North Carolina, graduating with a Juris Doctor and Master of Business Administration in 2017.

== Law career ==
Following her graduation, Kryst became licensed to practice law in both North Carolina and South Carolina, and began working as an attorney in civil litigation at Poyner Spruill LLP. She also worked pro bono not only for clients who were low-level drug offenders, but also with Brittany K. Barnett of the Buried Alive Project, to free a client sentenced to life imprisonment. She was the founder of the fashion blog White Collar Glam, dedicated to helping women dress professionally in white-collar jobs.

== Pageantry ==
Kryst first entered pageants as a teenager, winning Miss Freshman at Northwestern High School in Rock Hill, South Carolina, and later Miss Fort Mill High School in Fort Mill, South Carolina. After taking several years off from pageantry, Kryst made two attempts to win the Miss North Carolina title within the Miss America Organization, placing in the top ten on her first attempt and first runner-up on her second attempt.

=== Miss North Carolina USA 2019 ===
In 2016, Kryst competed in Miss North Carolina USA 2017, where she was the fourth runner-up to Katie Coble. She returned the following year and reached the top ten, before returning again for Miss North Carolina USA 2019, where she won the title, representing Metrolina. She was crowned by Kaaviya Sambasivam, Miss North Carolina Teen USA 2018.

=== Miss USA 2019 ===
As Miss North Carolina USA, Kryst represented North Carolina at Miss USA 2019, at the Grand Sierra Resort in Reno, Nevada. She won the competition and became the third woman from North Carolina to win the title, following Chelsea Cooley and Kristen Dalton, who were crowned Miss USA 2005 and Miss USA 2009, respectively. At 28 years and 4 days old, she broke the previous record of the oldest woman to be crowned Miss USA. After winning Miss USA, Kryst crowned Laura Little as her successor for the Miss North Carolina USA title. As Miss USA, Kryst took a one-year leave of absence from law to fulfill her pageantry duties. Kryst's reign was scheduled to end on spring 2020, but due to the COVID-19 pandemic, she became the longest reigning Miss USA titleholder on June 5, 2020, surpassing Nia Sanchez's previous record of 399 days. Her reign ended with a total of 557 days on November 9, 2020, and she crowned Asya Branch of Mississippi as her successor at Miss USA 2020.

=== Miss Universe 2019 ===
She represented the United States at Miss Universe 2019, and placed top 10 on December 8, 2019. Her national costume was inspired by four American female icons: Rosie the Riveter, the Statue of Liberty, Maya Angelou, and Lady Justice.

== Television hosting ==
In October 2019, Kryst became a New York City correspondent for the TV show Extra. She interviewed actor Terrence Howard and broke the news that he was retiring from acting after the final season of the TV series Empire.

In 2020, Kryst was nominated for the Daytime Emmy Award for Outstanding Entertainment News Program as correspondent on Extra. She was nominated again for the same award in 2021.

== Death ==
On January 30, 2022, Kryst died by suicide by jumping from The Orion, a 60-story high-rise apartment building in Midtown Manhattan, where she lived, and was last seen on the 29th floor. On January 31, the coroner ruled her death as suicide. Kryst's mother April Simpkins released a statement, stating that Kryst had "high-functioning depression".

Her death was mourned by many, including her former classmates and professors at Wake Forest University School of Law who remembered her intelligence, warmth, and service of others. Her former contracts professor and dean, Suzanne Reynolds, stated, "She always brought out the human side of the cases we studied, a gift that led her after graduation into pro bono work on death penalty cases. I grieve with her beloved family, classmates, and the thousands she touched, especially for the pain she must have endured before we lost her."

Awards and achievements
Preceded by Caelynn Miller-Keyes	Miss North Carolina USA; 2019	Succeeded by Laura Little
Preceded by Sarah Rose Summers, Nebraska	Miss USA; 2019	Succeeded by Asya Branch, Mississippi
