= Cristina Nardozzi =

American model (born 1983)

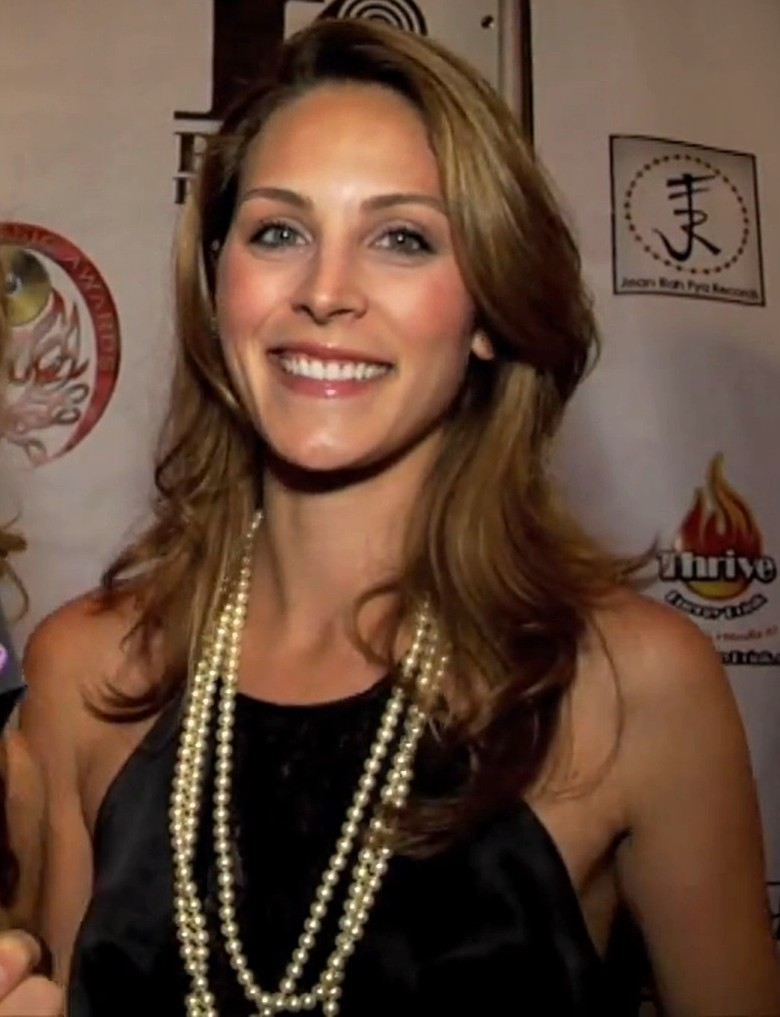
- Nardozzi in 2009
- Born: April 18, 1983 (age 43); Seekonk, Massachusetts, U.S.
- Beauty pageant titleholder
- Title: Miss Massachusetts USA 2005
- Major competition: Miss USA 2005

Cristina Nardozzi is an American model, actress, television personality, and beauty pageant titleholder who has competed in the Miss USA 2005 pageant but Unplaced.

In late 2004, Nardozzi won the Miss Massachusetts USA 2005 title in Quincy, Massachusetts. She represented her state at the Miss USA 2005 pageant held in Baltimore, Maryland in April 2005 but failed to place. The nationally televised pageant was won by Chelsea Cooley of North Carolina.

Nardozzi, a Communications major at Bridgewater State College was a three-year member of the women's indoor track and field program and holds their high jump record at 5'4". In August 2003, she was one of forty finalists selected to compete in the Sports Illustrated Fresh Faces Swimsuit Model Search. Nardozzi has worked as an intern in the sports department at WHDH 7 in Boston and aspires for a career in television broadcasting.

Nardozzi, Jennifer Fairbank (Miss Hawaii USA 2005), Kristen Berset (Miss Florida USA 2004), Tamiko Nash (Miss California USA 2006), Ellen Chapman (Miss California USA 2004), Angelique Breux (Mis California USA 1999) and Lindsay Douglas (Miss Kansas USA 2002 appeared on NBC's new show 1 vs. 100 which aired September 2006. She was a contestant on Fear Factor in 2005 on the Miss USA episode #5.29.

| Preceded by Maria Lekkakos | Miss Massachusetts USA; 2005 | Succeeded by Tiffany Kelly |
