= Marin Poole =

American model

- Born: Marin Morgan Poole; February 1, 1984 (age 41); Logan, Utah U.S.
- Height: 5 ft 9 in (1.75 m)

Marin Morgan Poole is an American teacher and beauty queen from Logan, Utah who has competed in the Miss Teen USA and Miss USA pageants.

Poole won the Miss Utah Teen USA 2002 title in a state pageant held in December 2001, competing as Miss Cache Valley Teen USA. She also won the Miss Congeniality and Miss Photogenic awards in that pageant. Her first runner up was Jessica Dawn Black, who later won the Miss Utah Teen USA 2003 title. Poole represented Utah in the Miss Teen USA 2002 pageant held in South Padre Island, Texas in August 2002 but did not place. The pageant was won by Vanessa Marie Semrow of Wisconsin.

In March 2003, less than six months after passing on her title, Poole won the Miss Cache Valley pageant and competed in the Miss Utah 2004 pageant. She placed fourth runner-up.

In late 2004, Poole won the Miss Utah USA 2005 title, becoming the 3rd former teen titleholder to win this crown. She competed in the Miss USA 2005 pageant broadcast live from Baltimore, Maryland in April 2005, and placed in the top fifteen. The pageant was won by Chelsea Cooley of North Carolina. Poole competed alongside fellow Miss Teen USA 2002 delegate Jessica Fjerstad in the pageant, as well as four other former Miss Teen USA delegates.

In 2006, Poole won another Miss Utah local title, Miss Salt Lake Valley, and competed in the Miss Utah pageant for a second time, this time hoping to win the Triple Crown, an informal title given to those who have held state titles in the Miss Teen USA, Miss USA and Miss America systems. As of 2006, only six women have achieved this status. Poole placed in the top ten in the Miss Utah state pageant, and won a talent preliminary award.

In March 2001, Poole was one of six teenagers named a Youth Advocate Of The Year for her work as a tobacco control advocate. She maintained tobacco prevention education as her platform for both the Miss Utah 2004 and 2006 pageants. She graduated from Logan High School (Utah) and Brigham Young University with Bachelor of Science in Health Science and Master of Public Health degrees. She currently teaches at Brigham Young University.

Preceded by Kyla Faye Dickerson	Miss Utah USA; 2005	Succeeded by Soben Huon
