= Ashley Love-Mills =

American fashion model and actress

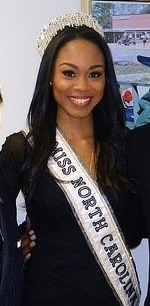
- Mills at the North Carolina National Guard black history celebration in 2013
- Born: Ashley Nicole Love-Mills; September 19, 1988 (age 38); Orlando, Florida, U.S.
- Education: North Carolina State University (BA)
- Height: 1.79 m (5 ft 10 in)
- Beauty pageant titleholder
- Hair color: Black
- Eye color: Brown
- Major competitions: Miss North Carolina USA 2011 (Top 10); Miss North Carolina USA 2013 (Winner); Miss USA 2013 (Top 10)

Ashley Love-Mills (born September 19, 1988 in Orlando, Florida) is an American actress, fashion model and beauty pageant titleholder who won the titles of Miss North Carolina USA 2013 and placed top 10 at Miss USA 2013.

== Personal life ==
Ashley is originally from Orlando, Florida. The daughter of James and Gloria Mills, she moved with her family to Raleigh, North Carolina in high school. She graduated in 2010 with a BA in Media Communications from North Carolina State University with a minor in TV/film production.

She makes her home in the Atlanta, Georgia area, and was named by Jezebel magazine (the city's lifestyle publication) as one of Atlanta's "50 Most Attractive People" in 2015 and was most recently named by Rolling Out Magazine as one of Atlanta's Top 25 Women in November 2016.

== Miss North Carolina USA ==
Ashley competed for the title of Miss North Carolina USA in 2010 and placed in the top 10. On November 10, 2012, she was crowned Miss North Carolina USA. During her tenure as Miss North Carolina USA, she created an anti-bullying campaign and, with help from the North Carolina Department of Public Instruction, she has been able to speak with over 25,000 students statewide about the serious problems of bullying. She is bicoastal between Los Angeles and Atlanta, and works full-time in entertainment as an actress and model.

== Miss USA ==
Ashley represented the state of North Carolina at the Miss USA 2013 pageant held at the Planet Hollywood Resort and Casino in Las Vegas, Nevada. She placed in the top 10, becoming the first North Carolina woman to place at the Miss USA pageant since Kristen Dalton won the title in 2009. The eventual winner was Erin Brady of Connecticut.

== After the pageants ==
Following her time as Miss North Carolina USA, Ashley worked in fashion as a catalog and runway model, and acted in small parts on television and in commercials. In 2015, she caught the attention of independent filmmaker Rick Prince (of the SyFy TV competition series FaceOff) who cast her as the lead in his first feature film. Soon thereafter, she landed a major recurring role on Tyler Perry's scripted drama for TLC, Too Close to Home. She announced in 2019 that she will have a role in the upcoming ABC TV series The Baker & The Beauty, an adaptation of a highly successful scripted musical comedy TV series in Israel. Ashley mostly recently starred in A Jenkins Family Christmas as Simone on BET+ which premiered in December 2021.

== Filmography ==
Year	Title	Role	Notes
2015	Lwa: All Saints' Eve	Monique Valliere	Independent film (as yet unreleased)
2016–2017	Tyler Perry's Too Close to Home	Valerie	The first scripted TV series for TLC
2019	The Baker & The Beauty	Zara	Based on the successful Israeli TV series
2021	A Jenkins Family Christmas	Simone	Directed By Robin Givens for BET+
2024	Toxic Harmony	Simone	Directed By Kevin Arbouet for TUBI
2025	Tempted	Andrea	Directed By Lindsay Hartley for TUBI
