= Kristen Dalton =

Kristen Dalton may refer to:

- Kristen Dalton (actress) (born 1966), American actress
- Kristen Dalton (Miss USA) (born 1986), American beauty pageant titleholder
