= Miss USA 2009 =

58th Miss USA pageant

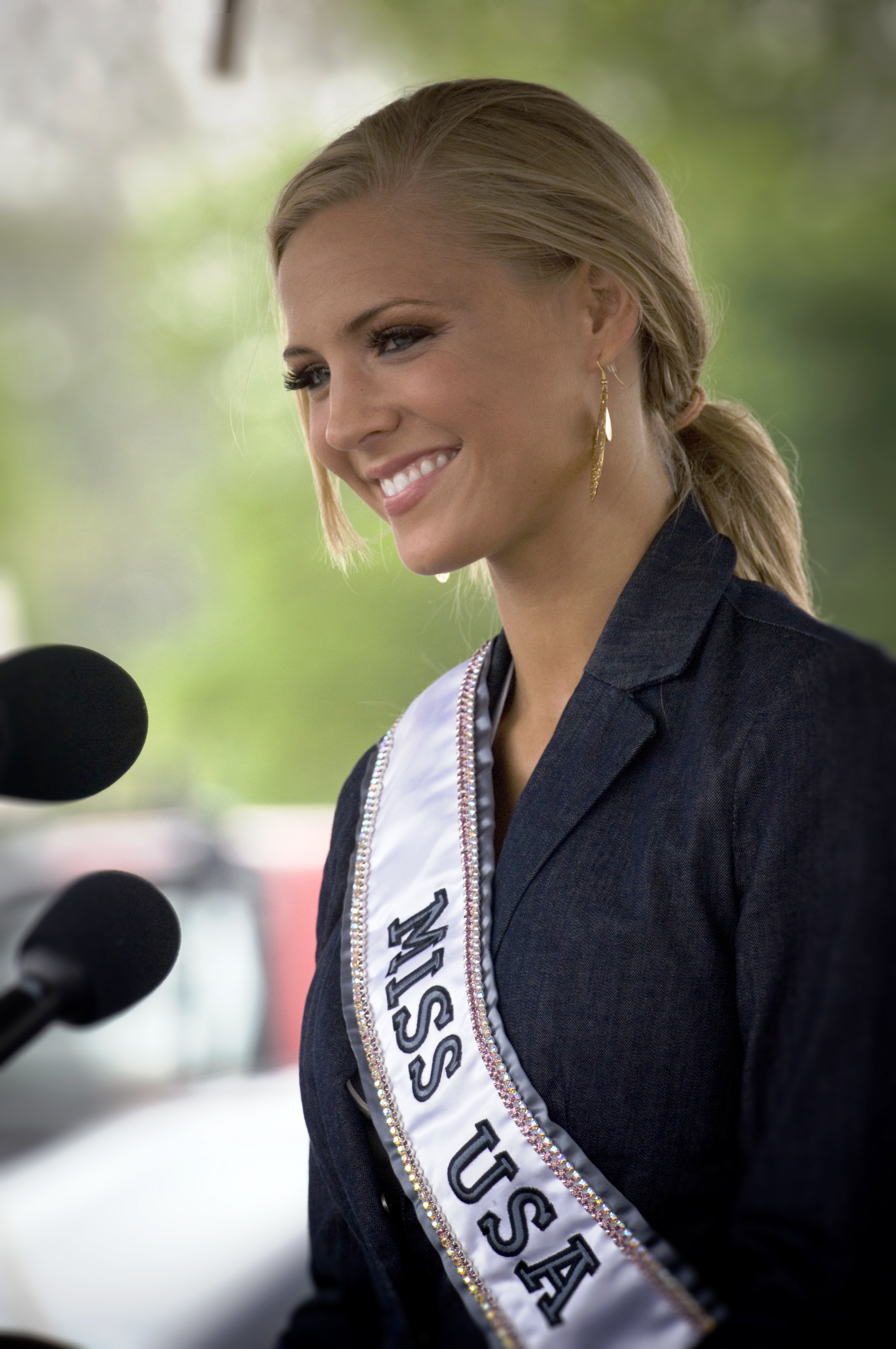
- Miss USA 2009 Kristen Dalton
- Date: April 19, 2009
- Presenters: Billy Bush; Nadine Velazquez
- Entertainment: Kevin Rudolf; The Veronicas
- Venue: Planet Hollywood Theatre for the Performing Arts, Paradise, Nevada
- Broadcaster: NBC (KVBC); Telemundo (KBLR)
- Entrants: 51
- Placements: 15
- Winner: Kristen Dalton; North Carolina
- Congeniality: Cynthia Pate (Wyoming)
- Photogenic: Jessi Pierson (West Virginia)

Miss USA 2009 was the 58th Miss USA pageant, held at the Planet Hollywood Theatre for the Performing Arts in Paradise, Nevada, on April 19, 2009. At the conclusion of the final night of competition, Kristen Dalton of North Carolina was crowned by outgoing titleholder Crystle Stewart of Texas.

The event was hosted by Billy Bush of Access Hollywood and actress Nadine Velazquez; Bush returned to host the pageant which he last emceed in 2005. He had previously co-hosted Miss USA 2003 with Daisy Fuentes and Miss USA 2004–2005 with Nancy O'Dell. Entertainment was provided by Kevin Rudolf who performed "Let It Rock" during the swimsuit competition and The Veronicas performed "Untouched" during the evening gown competition.

The competition was broadcast in High Definition for only the second time in history.

Delegates representing the fifty states plus the District of Columbia competed in the pageant, and arrived in Las Vegas on April 2. Miss USA Kristen Dalton represented the US at the Miss Universe 2009 pageant, where she reached the Top 10.

Pageants were held from June 2008 to January 2009 to select the representative for each state. During the final show on April 19, the fifteen delegates with the highest average scores from the preliminary competition were announced. The top fifteen competed in the swimsuit competition. The top ten delegates from swimsuit competed in evening gown. The top five delegates from the evening gown competition (not averaged composite scores from both competitions) competed in the final question round to determine the winner. The judges' composite score was shown after each round of competition for only the third time since 2002.

Miss USA 2009 Titlecard

== Results ==
=== Placements ===
Map showing placings by state.

Final results	Contestant
Miss USA 2009	North Carolina – Kristen Dalton
1st Runner-Up	California – Carrie Prejean
2nd Runner-Up	Arizona – Alicia-Monique Blanco

== Delegates ==
The Miss USA 2009 delegates were:

State/district	Contestant	Hometown	Age (Note: Ages at the time of the pageant)	Height	Placement	Award	Notes
Alabama	Rachel Philippona	Dothan	20				
Alaska	Jessica Irene Nolin	Palmer	22				
Arizona	Alicia-Monique Blanco	Phoenix	22	5'8"	2nd runner-up		
Arkansas	Chanley Painter	Conway	24	5'9"	Top 10		
California	Carrie Prejean	La Jolla	21	5'10"	1st runner-up		Later dethroned due to same-sex marriage controversy after the conclusion of the pageant
Colorado	Patrice Williams	Colorado Springs	22	5'7"			
Connecticut	Monica Mary Pietrzak	Manchester	25	5'11"	Top 15		
Delaware	Kate Banaszak	Middletown	24				
District of Columbia	Nicole White	Washington, D.C.	20	5'8"			Previously Miss District of Columbia Teen USA 2004
Florida	Anastagia Pierre	Fort Lauderdale	20	5'9"			Previously Miss Florida Teen USA 2004; Later Miss Bahamas Intercontinental 2010 and Miss Bahamas 2011
Georgia	Kimberly Gittings	Lilburn	20		Top 15		
Hawaii	Aureana Tseu	Mililani Town	25	5'7"			Previously Miss Hawaii Teen USA 1999
Idaho	Melissa Weber	Boise	27		Top 15		
Illinois	Ashley Bond	Chicago	24				
Indiana	Courtni Hall	Crawfordsville					Previously Miss Indiana Teen USA 2004
Iowa	Chelsea Lynn Gauger	Ankeny	20				
Kansas	Courtney Courter	Olathe	23	5'9"			
Kentucky	Maria Elizabeth Montgomery	Danville	19	5'10"	4th runner-up		
Louisiana	Lacey Minchew	Baton Rouge	25	5'7"			Previously Miss Teen America 2002, represented Georgia
Maine	Ashley Underwood	Benton	24	5'8"			Later contestant in Survivor: Redemption Island
Maryland	Gabrielle Carlson	Marion Station	24				
Massachusetts	Alison Cronin	Weymouth	21				Previously Miss Massachusetts Teen USA 2005
Michigan	Lindsey Tycholiz	Sterling Heights	26				
Minnesota	Erica Nego	Plymouth	24		Top 15		Later Miss Universe Ghana 2011
Mississippi	Jessica Lauren McRaney	Terry	23				Previously Miss Mississippi Teen USA 2004
Missouri	Stacey Smith	Florissant	23	5'9"			
Montana	Misti Vogt	Kalispell	23	5'11"			
Nebraska	Meagan Winings	Atkinson	23				Previously Miss Nebraska Teen USA 2004
Nevada	Georgina Vaughan	Las Vegas	21	5'10"			Previously Miss Nevada Teen USA 2006
New Hampshire	Christy Dunn	Laconia	26				
New Jersey	Kaity Rodriguez	Clifton	24				
New Mexico	Bianca Matamoros-Koonce	Albuquerque	23				
New York	Tracey Chang	New York City	26	5'7"			
North Carolina	Kristen Dalton	Wilmington	22	5'7"	Miss USA 2009		Daughter of Jeannie Boger, Miss North Carolina USA 1982; Sister of Julia Dalton, Miss North Carolina Teen USA 2008 and Miss North Carolina USA 2015
North Dakota	Kelsey Erickson	Grand Forks	22				
Ohio	Natasha Vivoda	Champion	21				
Oklahoma	Lauren Lunday	Altus	25				
Oregon	Sylvie Tarpinian	Eugene	24				
Pennsylvania	Lindsey Nelsen	Dallastown	21	5'7"			
Rhode Island	Alysha Castonguay	Woonsocket	22	5'6"			Previously Miss Rhode Island Teen USA 2002; Previously Miss Teen America 2003; Previously Miss Teen Galaxy 2005
South Carolina	Stephanie Murray Smith	Goose Creek	21	5'7"	Top 10		Later contestant in The Amazing Race 17
South Dakota	Jessica Rowell	Sioux Falls	22	5'7"			
Tennessee	Kristen Motil	Franklin	24	5'9"	Top 10		
Texas	Brooke Daniels	Tomball	22	5'9"	Top 10		
Utah	Laura Chukanov	Salt Lake City	22	5'9"	3rd runner-up		
Vermont	Brooke Werner	Granville	22				
Virginia	Maegan Phillips	Quantico	22		Top 15		
Washington	Tara Turnure	Seattle	23				Sister of Tracy Turnure, Miss Washington USA 2010
West Virginia	Jessi Pierson	Milton	21	5'7"	Top 10	Miss Photogenic	
Wisconsin	Alexandra Wehrley	Pewaukee	21	5'8"			Later worked as a television host
Wyoming	Cynthia Pate	Casper	22			Miss Congeniality	

== Controversy ==
During the 2009 Miss USA pageant, Miss California Carrie Prejean, was asked by openly gay pageant judge, Perez Hilton, whether she believed every state should legalize same-sex marriage. She responded that she did not. After the pageant Hilton made negative comments about the contestant and told ABC News: "She lost it because of that question. She was definitely the front-runner before that," leading some to believe that the answer directly had caused her to lose the competition. Prejean stated that Miss California USA officials had pressured her to apologize for her statement and "not talk" about her Christian faith.

Several politicians and commentators assailed Hilton and defended Prejean for honestly stating her personal beliefs.

Following the pageant, Prejean hired a Christian public relations firm, and appeared in a television advertisement by the National Organization for Marriage. However, on June 10, 2009, Prejean again stated that her question caused her to lose her title when she learned she was fired by Donald Trump. Miss California USA officials state that her answer had nothing to do with her termination, citing continued breach of her contract instead.

== New crown ==
In keeping with co-owner NBC Universal's "Green is Universal" environmental initiative, the Miss Universe Organization announced that Diamond Nexus Labs would become the official jewelry sponsor for the Miss Universe, Miss USA and Miss Teen USA pageants. DNL 's man-made gemstones are "all synthesized in clean labs using environmentally friendly processes". Diamond Nexus Labs will create a custom-designed crown for Miss USA 2009, as well as for the Miss Universe and Miss Teen USA pageants later this year.
