= Too Close to Home (TV series) =

2016 American drama television series by Tyler Perry

- Genre: Drama
- Created by: Tyler Perry
- Starring: Danielle Savre; Heather Locklear; Brock O'Hurn; Kelly Sullivan; Brad Benedict; Brooke Anne Smith; Alpha Trivette; Trisha Rae Stahl; Robert Craighead; Annie Thrash; Courtney Burrell; Curran Walters; Crystle Stewart; Justin Gabriel; Nick Ballard; Charles Justo
- Country of origin: United States
- Original language: English
- No. of seasons: 2
- No. of episodes: 16

Production
- Executive producer: Tyler Perry
- Running time: 42 minutes
- Production company: Tyler Perry Studios

Original release
- Network: TLC
- Release: August 22, 2016 – February 22, 2017

Too Close to Home is an American television drama series, created, executive produced, written and directed by Tyler Perry that debuted on TLC on August 22, 2016. It is the first scripted series for TLC. TLC renewed the show for a second season on September 1, 2016, which premiered on January 4, 2017. Reruns of the show often aired on OWN where all of Tyler Perry's other shows regularly air.

It was officially ordered as a series on March 31, 2016 with an eight-episode order. Danielle Savre was cast as the series' lead, and Heather Locklear and Matt Battaglia make guest appearances.

On November 2, 2017, it was confirmed that the show had been cancelled and would not be renewed for a third season.

== Plot ==
The series follows a young woman, Anna, from a working class life who, after having an affair with the President of the United States, becomes the center of a political scandal. When the scandal erupts, she returns to her old life. As soon as she arrives, she is met with several unresolved issues from family members and past lovers.

== Cast and characters ==
=== Main ===
- Danielle Savre as Annie Belle "Anna" Hayes, a woman who works in the White House, but after her affair with the President is revealed she resorts to a safe place, which is her hometown in Happy, Alabama
- Brock O'Hurn as Brody Allen, Anna's former love interest who currently has feelings for Bonnie
- Kelly Sullivan as Bonnie Hayes, Anna's eldest sister, who has natural love for Anna. She takes care of Anna's daughter Rebel, Shelby's son Mac, and her mother Jolene. She also helps Brody take care of his father, Dr Allen. She also works at the May Sally's Diner
- Brad Benedict as J.B., Brody's estranged half-brother and Bonnie's ex-boyfriend
- Brooke Anne Smith as Michelle "Shelby" Hayes, the youngest Hayes sister and Mac's mother, who is a drug and alcohol addict
- Alpha Trivette as Doctor Allen, Brody's father who has dementia
- Trisha Rae Stahl as Jolene, Anna, Bonnie and Shelby's mother who is suffering from morbid obesity and hoarding
- Robert Craighead as Sheriff Mobley
- Annie Thrash as Rebel, Anna's 15-year-old daughter
- Curran Walters as Mac, Shelby's teenage son
- Crystle Stewart as Frankie (season 2), a licensed therapist and the Hayes' neighbor who knows about Regina and Elm's affair
- Justin Gabriel as Rick (season 2; recurring, season 1), Shelby's love interest
- Nick Ballard as Dax (season 2; recurring, season 1), Anna's friend who works with her in the White House
- Charles Justo as Victor (season 2; recurring, season 1), Anna's friend and Dax's boyfriend

=== Recurring ===
- Christian Ochoa as John (season 1), a news reporter
- Ashley Love-Mills as Valerie, Anna's former best friend who works with her in the White House
- Jason Vendryes as Agent Larry (season 1)
- Matt Battaglia as President Thomas Christian (season 2; guest, season 1), Anna's love interest
- Heather Locklear as First Lady Katelynn Christian (season 2; guest, season 1)
- Angela Rigsby as Octavia (season 2; guest, season 1), Bonnie's neighbor and coworker
- Azur-De Johnson as Regina (season 2), Nelson's wife who has an affair with his best friend, Elm
- Courtney Burrell as Nelson (season 2), Octavia's older brother and Regina's husband who returns after serving time in the army
- Nelson Estevez as Elm (season 2), Nelson's friend and Tina's husband
- K. D. Aubert as Tina (season 2), Elm's wife
- James Shanklin as Eli (season 2), Rebel and Mack's father

== Episodes ==
=== Series overview ===
Season	Episodes	Originally released	
Season	Episodes	First released	Last released
1	8	August 22, 2016	October 10, 2016
2	8	January 4, 2017	February 22, 2017

=== Season 1 (2016) ===
No. overall	No. in season	Title	Original release date	US viewers (millions)
1	1	"Dangerously Close"	August 22, 2016	0.77
Anna, who works at the White House, has her closely guarded secret revealed. Special guest stars: Heather Locklear and Matt Battaglia.
2	2	"Alabama"	August 22, 2016	0.77
In order to protect herself, Anna searches for a safe haven after her secret gets found out and soon finds that home is the only place to go. Special guest star: Heather Locklear.
3	3	"Highway 16"	August 29, 2016	0.81
While she's with Bonnie, Shelby unknowingly puts their lives in danger
4	4	"Have You Heard?"	September 5, 2016	0.60
Anna's recent controversy sparks questions
5	5	"A Surprise Visit"	September 12, 2016	0.63
Anna introduces her co-worker's partner Victor to Happy, Alabama
6	6	"Hard Feelings"	September 19, 2016	0.68
Anna's arrival home comes with unhappy results.
7	7	"In My Sister's Shoes"	October 3, 2016	0.66
Bonnie shares a memorable moment with Anna.
8	8	"The Evil Dragon"	October 10, 2016	0.76
In the season 1 finale, J.B. meets up with Shelby.

=== Season 2 (2017) ===
No. overall	No. in season	Title	Original release date	US viewers (millions)
9	1	"The Mysterious Man"	January 4, 2017	1.027
The town is abuzz following a catastrophic event. Special guest stars: Heather Locklear and Matt Battaglia.
10	2	"A Family Affair"	January 11, 2017	1.032
Mack reveals troubling news about Rebel.
11	3	"Blocked In"	January 18, 2017	1.6555
Regina and Elm take precautions to keep their secret, and an unexpected guest arrives in Happy. Special guest stars: Heather Locklear and Matt Battaglia.
12	4	"A Happy Invasion"	January 25, 2017	1.177
Outsiders invade Happy, Alabama. Special guest star: Heather Locklear
13	5	"Car Trouble"	February 1, 2017	1.179
Frankie's car trouble leads to a shocking revelation for Octavia.
14	6	"A Game of Chess"	February 8, 2017	1.027
Octavia fights to keep a family secret; Bonnie tries to keep her family safe. Special guest star: Heather Locklear
15	7	"Mercury"	February 15, 2017	0.979
Tempers flare when the community comes together to clean Jolene's trailer. Special guest stars: Heather Locklear and Matt Battaglia.
16	8	"Blurred Lines"	February 22, 2017	1.174
Confrontation and chaos surround everyone amid a joyful occasion. Special guest stars: Heather Locklear and Matt Battaglia.
