= Miss North Carolina's Teen =

- Formation: 2005
- Type: Scholarship pageant
- Location: Raleigh, North Carolina
- Members: Miss America's Teen
- Official language: English
- Key people: John Norris
- Website: Official website

The Miss North Carolina's Teen competition is the pageant that selects the representative for the U.S. state of North Carolina in the Miss America's Teen pageant.

Hanley House of Cleveland, North Carolina was the first contestant from North Carolina to win the national title on January 13, 2024.

In January 2023, the official name of the pageant was changed from Miss North Carolina's Outstanding Teen, to Miss North Carolina's Teen, in accordance with the national pageant.

Camdyn Lee of Catawba was crowned Miss North Carolina's Teen on June 27, 2026, at the High Point Theater in High Point, North Carolina. She competed for the title of Miss America's Teen 2027 on September 5, 2026, at the Kravis Center for the Performing Arts in West Palm Beach, Florida.

== Results summary ==
The following is a visual summary of the past results of Miss North Carolina's Teen titleholders presented in the table below. The year in parentheses indicates year of the Miss America's Teen competition in which the placement and/or award was garnered.

=== Placements ===
- Miss America's Teen: Hanley House (2024)
- 1st runners-up: Catherine White (2017)
- 3rd runners-up: Katherine Puryear (2010)
- Top 8: Emili McPhail (2014)
- Top 11: Camdyn Lee (2027)
- Top 15: McKenzie Faggart (2012)

=== Awards ===
==== Preliminary awards ====
- Preliminary Fitness: Hanley House (2024)
- Preliminary Evening Gown: Hanley House (2024), Camdyn Lee (2027)
- Preliminary Evening Wear/On-Stage Question: Catherine White (2017)

==== Other awards ====
- America's Choice: McKenzie Faggart (2012)
- Outstanding Achievement in Academic Life Award: Emili McPhail (2014)
- Outstanding Instrumental Talent Award: Emili McPhail (2014)
- Scholastic Excellence Award: Karson Fair (2015)

== Winners ==
- Declared as winner
- Ended as a runner-up
- Ended as a finalist or semi-finalist

Year	Name	Hometown	Age	Local title	Talent	Placement at MAO Teen	Special scholarships at MAO Teen	Notes
2026	Camdyn Lee	Catawba	17	Miss Cabarrus County's Teen	Lyrical Dance	Top 11	Preliminary Evening Gown	
2025	Kate Ward	Kenansville	18	Miss Johnston County's Teen	Lyrical Dance			Previously Miss High School America 2023
2024	Kamryn Hollowell	Clayton	17	Miss Statesville's Teen	Dance			
2023	Annika Schneider	Stanfield	18	Miss Metrolina's Teen	Dance	Did not compete; originally 3rd runner-up, later assumed the title after House was named Miss America's Teen 2024		Later Miss Puerto Rico 2026
2023	Hanley House	Cleveland	16	Miss Cleveland's Teen	Lyrical Dance, "Don't Stop Believing"	Winner	Preliminary Evening Gown Preliminary Fitness	
2022	Kerrigan Brown	Spivey's Corner	17	Miss Zebulon's Outstanding Teen	Dance			
2021	Harley Tilque	Charlotte	17	Miss Metrolina's Outstanding Teen	Lyrical Dance, "Rescue"			
2019-20	Karlee Sanderford	Wendell	16	Miss Garner's Outstanding Teen	Jazz Dance, "Proud Mary" by Tina Turner			
2018	Caroline Credle	Clayton	17	Miss Clayton's Outstanding Teen	Ballet en Pointe, La Esmeralda			
2017	Marissa Garrison	Mount Holly	15	Miss Queen City's Outstanding Teen	Contemporary Dance			
2016	Catherine White	Clayton	17	Miss Clayton's Outstanding Teen	Tap Dance, "Feet Don’t Fail Me Now"	1st runner-up	Preliminary Evening Wear/OSQ Award	
2015	McKenzie Hansley	Hampstead	16	Miss Spivey Corner's Outstanding Teen	Acro-Jazz Dance			Later Miss North Carolina Teen USA 2017 Later Miss North Carolina Collegiate America 2019 Later Miss District of Columbia Collegiate America 2020 Later Miss North Carolina USA 2024
2014	Karson Fair	Benson	17	Miss Greater Cape Fear's Outstanding Teen	Tap Dance, "Smooth Criminal"		Scholastic Excellence Award	3rd runner-up at Miss Alabama 2017 pageant 2nd runner-up at Miss Alabama 2018 pageant
2013	Emili McPhail	Roseboro	17	Miss Fayetteville's Outstanding Teen	Piano, "All Of Me"	Top 8	Outstanding Achievement in Academic Life Award Outstanding Instrumental Talent Award	Later Miss Virginia 2018
2012	Alexandra Badgett	Reidsville	15	Miss Lake Norman's Outstanding Teen	Tap Dance			Later Miss North Carolina 2019
2011	McKenzie Faggart	Concord	16	Miss Cabarrus County's Outstanding Teen	Dance	Top 15	America's Choice	Later Miss North Carolina 2016
2010	Kayla Hollingsworth	Randleman	17	Miss Thomasville's Outstanding Teen	Dance			
2009	Katherine Puryear	Thomasville	16	Miss Thomasville's Outstanding Teen	Acrobatic Dance	3rd runner-up		Later Miss North Carolina Teen USA 2012; Top 16 at Miss Teen USA 2012 pageant Current NFL cheerleader for the Dallas Cowboys
2008	Mya Hipps	Gastonia	17	Miss Gastonia's Outstanding Teen	Vocal, "Half a Moment" from By Jeeves			
2007	BrieAnna Hester	Henderson	16	Miss Central Carolina's Outstanding Teen	Lyrical Dance			4th runner-up at Miss North Carolina 2013 pageant
2006	Ciara Newman	Hendersonville		Miss Hendersonville's Outstanding Teen	Lyrical Dance			
2005	Kayla Moran	Mount Holly	15	Miss Mount Holly's Outstanding Teen	Vocal			
