= Vickie Sutton =

American law professor

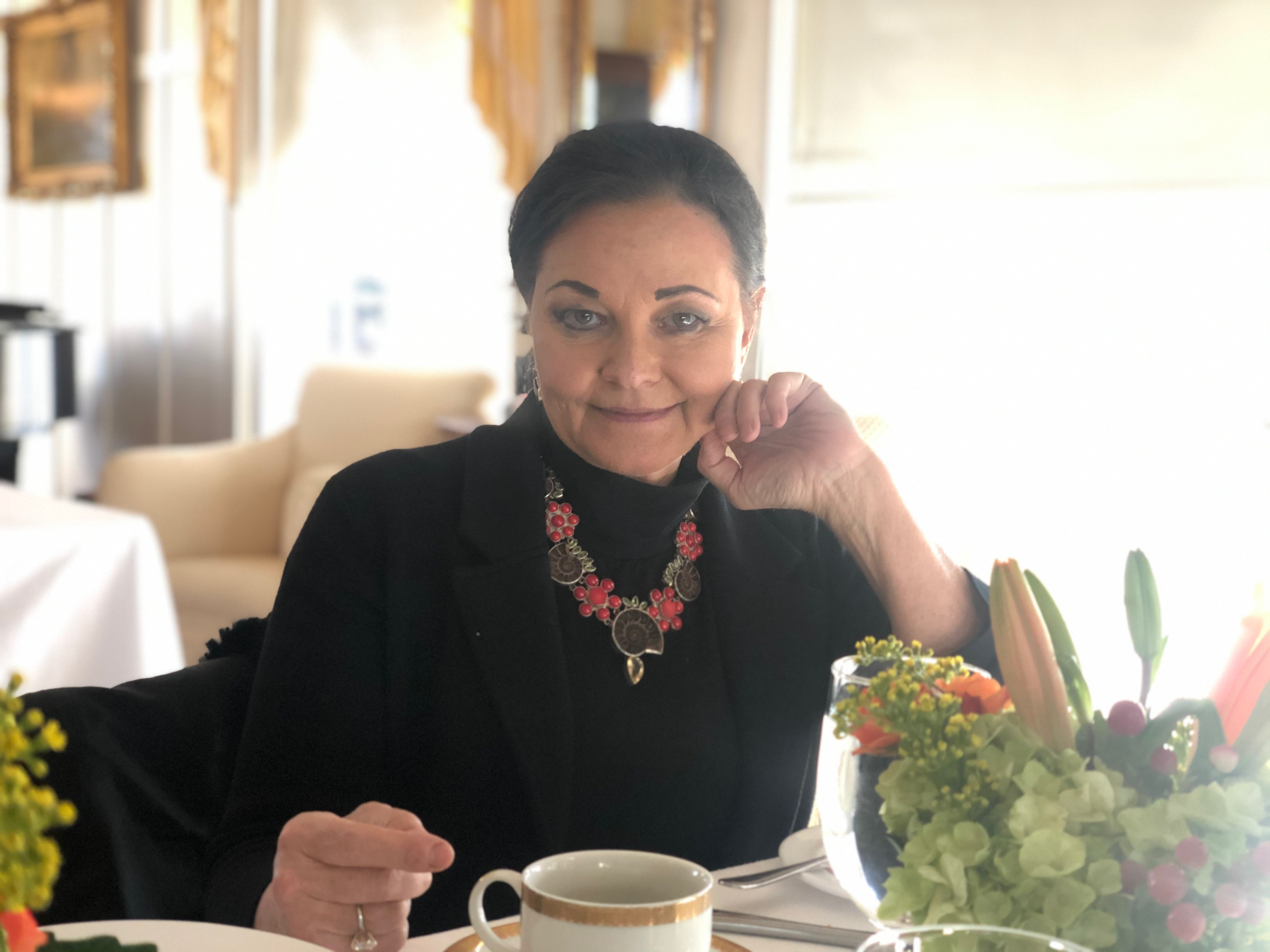
- Vickie Sutton, 2019
- Born: Vickie Verbyla; 9 April 1956 (age 70); Lenoir, North Carolina, USA
- Occupations: academic, political appointee
- Known for: Chief Counsel, Research and Innovative Technology Administration, U.S. Department of Transportation, 2005-2007; Assistant Director, Office of Science and Technology Policy, also known as the White House Science Office, 1991-1993

Academic background
- Education: North Carolina State University; Old Dominion University; The University of Texas at Dallas; Washington College of Law

Academic work
- Discipline: Law
- Sub-discipline: Biosecurity Law, Environmental Law
- Institutions: Texas Tech University

Vickie Sutton (born 1956) (née Vickie Verbyla) is an American law professor currently on the faculty of Texas Tech University. Since 2014, Sutton has been on the Texas Task Force on Infectious Disease Preparedness and Response.

== Life ==
Sutton grew up in Lenoir, North Carolina, and she is a member of the Lumbee Indian Tribe in North Carolina. She was Miss North Carolina USA in 1977 (under the pseudonym Vikki Verbyla).

She received her master's degree in public administration from Old Dominion University. She received her Ph.D. in environmental sciences at the University of Texas at Dallas while working as a legal assistant in Dallas, Texas.

After her Ph.D. she worked at the U.S. Environmental Protection Agency (U.S. EPA) headquarters in Washington, D.C. as special assistant to J. Clarence Davies, the assistant administrator for policy, planning and evaluation. Climate change was the environmental issue rising to the top of the White House's agenda at the time, which led to Sutton taking a position at the Office of Science and Technology Policy (OSTP) as the U.S. EPA liaison. She eventually left EPA to work for OSTP on the climate change framework convention meetings led by OSTP and the State Department as senior policy analyst.

She rose to be assistant director of FCCSET, which is now called the National Science and Technology Council, coordinating more than 2,000 federal scientists in research programs focusing on climate change, high performance computing and communications, biotechnology and advanced materials (later nanotechnology). She oversaw the President's Council of Advisors on Science and Technology, organizing monthly meetings with the president of the United States.

Sutton pursued a J.D. degree at American University, Washington College of Law, magna cum laude in 1999. During her time in law school, she interned in the U.S. Department of Justice, Environment and Natural Resources, Indian Resources Section in 1996 and in the U.S. Court of Appeals for the Federal Circuit, for Judge Plager.

Vickie Sutton started her tenure-track career in fall 1999 at Texas Tech University School of Law.

Sutton was the first woman to run for U.S. Congress in the 2003 Texas's 19th Congressional District special election.

In 2004, she was a visiting lecturer at the Yale Law School and the Yale School of Public Health. In 2005, became the co-PI with the Centers of Excellence for Biodefence and Emerging Infectious Diseases. At that time, she established the first journal of law in the field of Law, Policy and Biodefence.

In 2005, Sutton joined the Policy Advisory Board of the National Congress of American Indians.

In 2005, Vickie Sutton served as the first chief counsel (2005-2007) for the Research and Innovative Technology Administration (RITA) of U.S. Department of Transportation. She served as the co-chair for the U.S. DOT Climate Change Council and as the U.S. DOT representative to the U.S. Coral Reef Task Force.

In 2007, Sutton returned to her academic position at Texas Tech University and in 2013, she served as associate dean for research and faculty development.

== Academic work ==
=== Bioterrorism and law ===
Sutton was one of only a few law scholars in the U.S. working on biosecurity and bioterrorism and law when the anthrax attacks of 2001 occurred. She developed expertise in the regulation of scientists in biosecurity and biosafety, and the area of federalism in managing public health emergencies between state and federal governments. In 2002, she published "Law and Bioterrorism" with Carolina Academic Press.

In 2007, Vickie Sutton developed a casebook, "Law and Biotechnology".

In 2011, she published her book on "Nanotechnology Law and Policy", noted as the most popular casebook in this field for law schools.

"Introduction to Emerging Technologies Law" was published in 2015.

=== Environmental Law ===
Vickie Sutton was part of a NOAA grant through the Texas Sea Grant program where she crafted ordinances to respond to aesthetic opinions about wind energy on the coast, which became a model for ordinances for local governments along the Texas Gulf Coast.

== Awards ==
Sutton was honored as a Distinguished Alumni of Old Dominion University in 2005 for her service in government.

Vickie Sutton was awarded the Paul Whitfield Horn Professorship, the highest honor that can be bestowed on a faculty member of Texas Tech University, for international and national recognition of her scholarly work.

In 2010, President Obama cited her research in a Press Release of an Executive Order to review a regulatory program that has an effect on policymaking.
