= Miss USA 2013 =

62nd Miss USA pageant

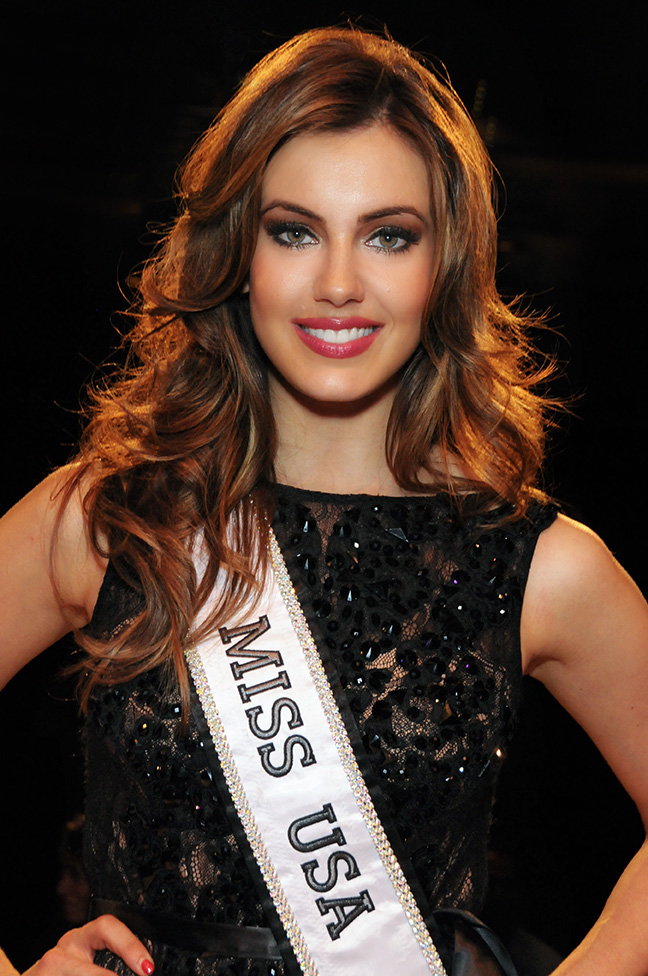
- Erin Brady, Miss USA 2013
- Date: June 16, 2013
- Presenters: Nick Jonas; Giuliana Rancic; Jeannie Mai
- Entertainment: Jonas Brothers; Pauly D
- Venue: The AXIS, Paradise, Nevada
- Broadcaster: NBC (KSNV-DT); Telemundo (KBLR)
- Entrants: 51
- Placements: 15
- Winner: Erin Brady; Connecticut

Miss USA 2013 was the 62nd Miss USA pageant, held on June 16, 2013, at The AXIS in Paradise, Nevada. The 50 states and the District of Columbia competed for the title and the pageant was televised live on NBC. Outgoing titleholder Nana Meriwether of Maryland crowned her successor Erin Brady of Connecticut at the end of the event. This was Connecticut's first ever Miss USA crown.

Viewers were able to interact with the pageant via Twitter and Zeebox. Fans were able to vote for their favorite contestant through the Miss USA website, from May 15 to June 15. Jessica Billings, Miss Pennsylvania USA, winner of this fan vote won top 15 placement on the final night. Miss Texas USA, Alexandria Nugent, won the most Twitter votes among the top 10, winning her a place in the top 6.

== Background ==
=== Selection of contestants ===
One delegate from each state and the District of Columbia was chosen in state pageants held which began in July 2012 and ended in January 2013. The first state pageant was Florida, held on July 14, 2012, as scheduled. The final pageants were Maine and Nevada, both held on January 27, 2013.

Ten delegates are former Miss Teen USA state winners, while two are former Miss America state winners and the other two are also former Miss America's Outstanding Teen state winners. Courtney Gifford became the first former Miss America's Outstanding Teen contestant winning the Miss USA state title.

=== Preliminary round ===
Prior to the final telecast, the delegates competed in the preliminary competition, which involves private interviews with the judges and a presentation show where they compete in swimsuit and evening gown. The preliminary competition took place on June 12, 2013, at 10 pm (ET) hosted by Chet Buchanan and Nana Meriwether, and was broadcast online on the official Miss USA website via stream.

=== Finals ===
During the final competition, the top fifteen competed in swimsuit, while the top ten competed evening gown, and the top six competed in the final question signed up by a panel of judges. The sixth finalist was determined by Twitter vote.

== Results ==
=== Placements ===
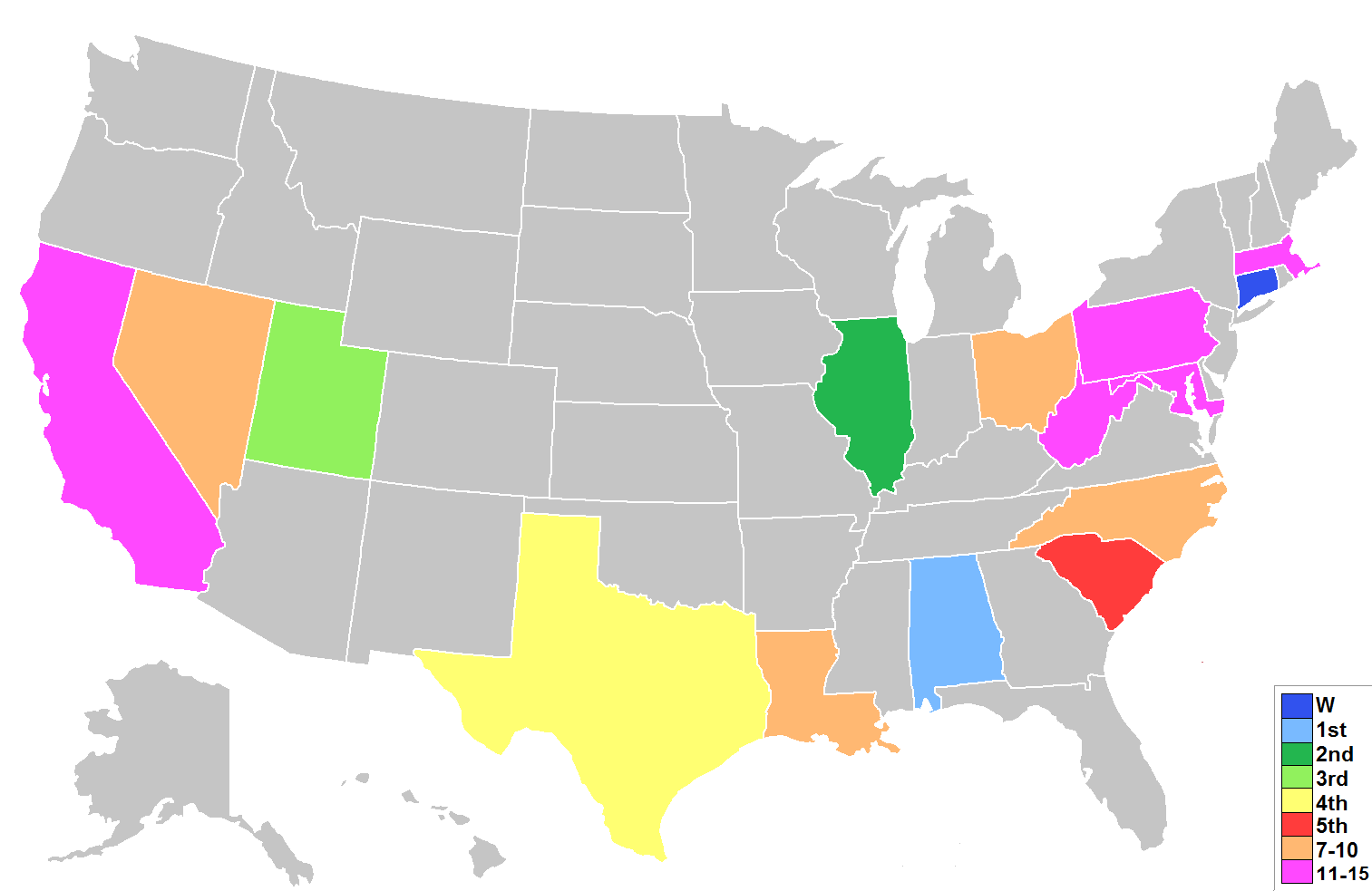
The state map results of Miss USA 2013, colors shaded in each state

Placement	Contestant
Miss USA 2013	Connecticut – Erin Brady
1st Runner-Up	Alabama – Mary-Margaret McCord
2nd Runner-Up	Illinois – Stacie Juris
3rd Runner-Up	Utah – Marissa Powell
4th Runner-Up	Texas – Alexandria Nugent §
5th Runner-Up	South Carolina – Megan Pinckney
Top 10	Louisiana – Kristen Girault; Nevada – Chelsea Caswell; North Carolina – Ashley Love-Mills; Ohio – Kristin Smith
Top 15	California – Mabelynn Capeluj; Maryland – Kasey Staniszewski; Massachusetts – Sarah Kidd; Pennsylvania – Jessica Billings ‡; West Virginia – Chelsea Welch

‡ Voted into Top 15 via Internet
§ Voted into Top 6 after the evening gown competition via Twitter

== Delegates ==
51 delegates participated:

State/district	Contestant	Hometown	Age (Note: Ages at the time of the pageant)	Height	Placement	Notes
Alabama	Mary Margaret McCord	Gadsden	23	5'7"	1st Runner-Up	
Alaska	Melissa McKinney	Anchorage	26	5'11"		
Arizona	Rachel Massie	Glendale	20	5'6"		
Arkansas	Hannah Billingsley	Franklin	22	5'7"		
California	Mabelynn Capeluj	San Diego	21	5'8"	Top 15	Later competed at Nuestra Belleza Latina 2015
Colorado	Amanda Wiley	Littleton	26	5'10"		
Connecticut	Erin Brady	East Hampton	26	5'7"	Miss USA 2013	Top 10 at Miss Universe 2013
Delaware	Rachel Baiocco	Bear	22	5'6"		
District of Columbia	Jessica Frith	Washington, D.C.	26	5'6"		
Florida	Michelle Aguirre	Hialeah	20	5'7"		
Georgia	Brittany Sharp	Roswell	22	5'10"		Previously Miss Georgia Teen USA 2006
Hawaii	Brianna Acosta	Waialua	21	5'10"		
Idaho	Marissa Wickland	Boise	21	5'6"		Previously Miss Idaho Teen USA 2009
Illinois	Stacie Juris	Chicago	22	5'7"	2nd Runner-Up	Previously Miss Illinois Teen USA 2009
Indiana	Emily Hart	Fort Wayne	26	5'9"		
Iowa	Richelle Orr	Hampton	21	5'3"		Previously Miss Iowa Teen USA 2011
Kansas	Staci Klinginsmith	Lenexa	26	5'8"		
Kentucky	Allie Leggett	McCreary County	19	5'7"		
Louisiana	Kristen Girault	New Orleans	22	5'8"	Top 10	
Maine	Ali Clair	South China	24	5'9"		
Maryland	Kasey Staniszewski	Annapolis	22	5'9"	Top 15	Previously Miss Maryland's Outstanding Teen 2007; Previously Miss Maryland Teen USA 2009
Massachusetts	Sarah Kidd	Leominster	20	5'8"	Top 15	
Michigan	Jaclyn Schultz	Wyandotte	24	6'0"		Later contestant of Survivor: San Juan del Sur
Minnesota	Danielle Hooper	Inver Grove Heights	21	5'9"		
Mississippi	Paromita Mitra	Hattiesburg	22	5'3"		Previously Miss Mississippi Teen USA 2009
Missouri	Ellie Holtman	Montgomery City	21	5'11"		
Montana	Kacie West	Kalispell	24	5'8"		Previously Miss Montana 2010
Nebraska	Ellie Lorenzen	Omaha	23	5'7"		
Nevada	Chelsea Caswell	Summerlin	23	5'8"	Top 10	
New Hampshire	Amber Faucher	Pelham	22	5'6"		Previously Miss New Hampshire Teen USA 2009
New Jersey	Libel Duran	Keasbey	23	5'8"		
New Mexico	Kathleen Danzer	Rio Rancho	24	5'8"		
New York	Joanne Nosuchinsky	Hell's Kitchen	24	5'7"		
North Carolina	Ashley Love-Mills	Raleigh	24	5'9"	Top 10	
North Dakota	Stephanie Erickson	Fargo	23	5'9"		
Ohio	Kristin Smith	Dayton	22	5'8"	Top 10	
Oklahoma	Makenzie Muse	Yukon	21	5'8"		
Oregon	Gabrielle Neilan	Gresham	23	5'5"		Miss Congeniality
Pennsylvania	Jessica Billings	Philadelphia	26	5'9"	Top 15	Won top 15 semifinalist spot via online voting
Rhode Island	Brittany Stenovitch	Cranston	19	5'6"		
South Carolina	Megan Pinckney	North Charleston	22	5'8"	5th Runner-Up	Previously Miss South Carolina Teen USA 2010
South Dakota	Jessica Albers	Yankton	27	5'10"		
Tennessee	Brenna Mader	Nashville	26	5'9"		Previously Miss Wyoming Teen USA 2005; Sister of Jamie Mader, Miss Wyoming Teen USA 2002
Texas	Ali Nugent	Dallas	20	5'9"	4th Runner-Up	Won top 6 finalist spot via Twitter
Utah	Marissa Powell	Salt Lake City	21	5'8"	3rd Runner-Up	Miss Photogenic
Vermont	Sarah Westbrook	Burlington	25	5'7"		
Virginia	Shannon McAnally	Arlington	25	5'5"		
Washington	Cassandra Searles	Redmond	24	5'7"		
West Virginia	Chelsea Welch	West Union	22	5'10"	Top 15	Previously Miss West Virginia Teen USA 2007
Wisconsin	Chrissy Zamora	Milwaukee	26	5'8"		
Wyoming	Courtney Gifford	Sheridan	24	5'7"		Previously Miss Wyoming's Outstanding Teen 2005; Previously Miss Wyoming 2008

== Judges ==
Preliminary Judges:

- Andrea Calvaruso
- Fred Nelson
- Kristin Boehm
- Kristin Prowty
- Lynne Diamante
- Nick Light
- Rob Goldstone

Telecast Judges:

- Bob Harper - trainer and star of The Biggest Loser
- Betsey Johnson - fashion designer
- NeNe Leakes - reality show star, actress
- Wendie Malick - star of Hot in Cleveland
- Jessica Robertson - star of reality show Duck Dynasty
- Larry Fitzgerald - Arizona Cardinals wide receiver
- Nikki Bella - WWE Diva wrestler
- Mo Rocca - TV/radio/blog political satirist
