= 2003 Texas's 19th congressional district special election =

2003 Texas' 19th congressional district special election
- May 3, 2003 (first round); June 3, 2003 (runoff)
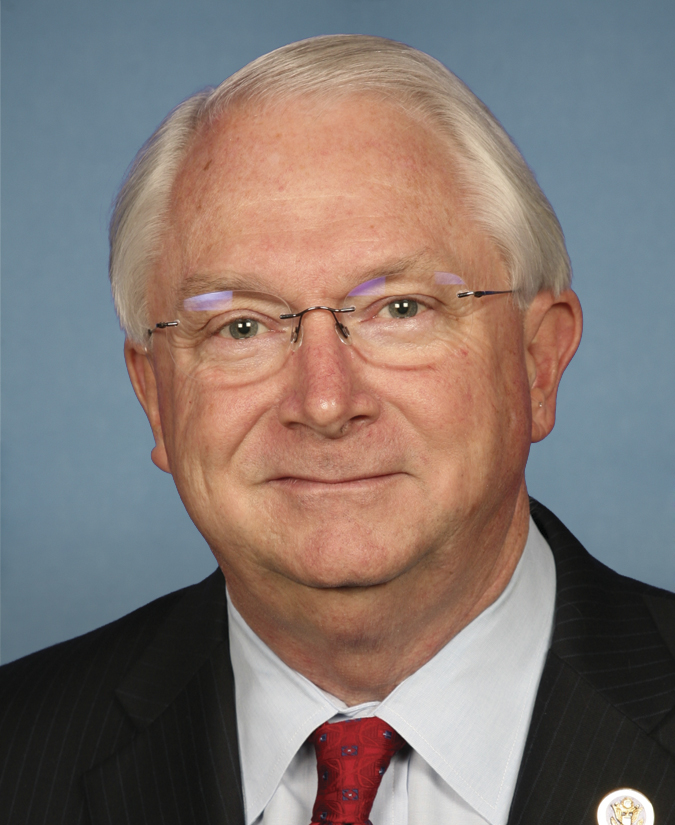

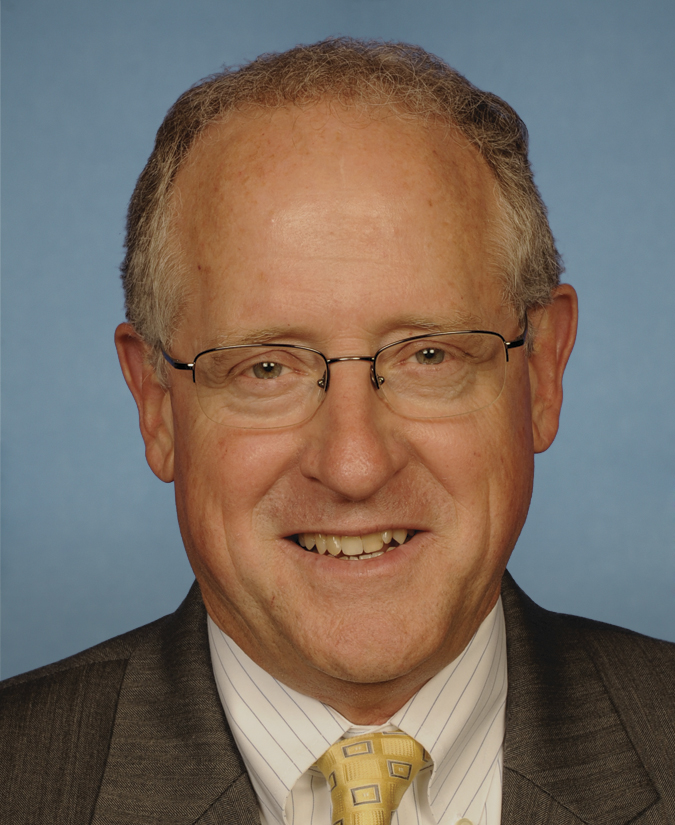
Nominee	Randy Neugebauer	Mike Conaway
Party	Republican	Republican
First round	13,091; 22.42%	12,270; 21.02%
Runoff	28,546; 50.52%	27,959; 49.48%
Candidate	Carl Isett	David Langston
Party	Republican	Republican
First round	11,015; 18.87%	8,053; 13.79%
Runoff	Eliminated	Eliminated
- Neugebauer: 20–30% 30–40% 40–50% 50–60% 60–70% 70–80% 80–90% Conaway: 20–30% 30–40% 50–60% 60–70% 70–80% 80–90% Bell: 70–80% Christian: 20–30% Bartlett: 20–30%
U.S. Representative before election
Larry Combest
Republican
Elected U.S. Representative
Randy Neugebauer
Republican

The 2003 United States House of Representatives special election in Texas's 19th congressional district was held on June 3, 2003 to select the successor to Larry Combest (R) who resigned to spend more time with his family. In accordance with Texas law, the special election was officially nonpartisan. This election took place during the highly controversial 2003 Texas Redistricting, during which the placement of the cities of Lubbock and Midland within the district were heavily debated. Though Randy Neugebauer of Lubbock won the special election, the new maps used for the 2004 elections put Midland in a separate district, allowing Mike Conaway to run in and win the open seat.

On May 3, seventeen candidates, including eleven Republicans, competed on the same ballot. However, as no candidate was able to achieve a majority, a runoff was held a month later.

2003 Texas 19th Special Primary
Party	Candidate	Votes	%
Republican	Randy Neugebauer	13,091	22.42
Republican	Mike Conaway	12,270	21.02
Republican	Carl Isett	11,015	18.87
Republican	David Langston	8,053	13.79
Republican	Stace Williams	2,609	4.46
Republican	Vickie Sutton	1,987	3.40
Republican	Jamie Berryhill Jr.	1,907	3.26
Republican	John D. Bell	1,883	3.22
Democratic	Kaye Gaddy	1,396	2.39
Republican	Richard Bartlett	1,046	1.79
Republican	Bill Christian	1,029	1.76
Democratic	Jerri Simmons-Asmussen	898	1.53
Republican	Donald May	629	1.07
Green	Julia Penelope	223	0.38
Libertarian	Chip Peterson	159	0.27
Constitution	Thomas Flournoy	93	0.15
Independent	Ed Hicks	81	0.13
Total votes		58,369	100

== Runoff ==
Former Mayor pro tempore of Lubbock Randy Neugebauer narrowly won in the runoff over Mike Conaway, the Chairman of the Texas Board of Public Accountancy, despite the latter's connections to then-President and former Governor of Texas George W. Bush.

2003 Texas 19th Special Run-off
Party	Candidate	Votes	%
Republican	Randy Neugebauer	28,546	50.52
Republican	Mike Conaway	27,959	49.48
Total votes		56,505	100.00
