= Crystle Stewart =

American model and beauty pageant titleholder

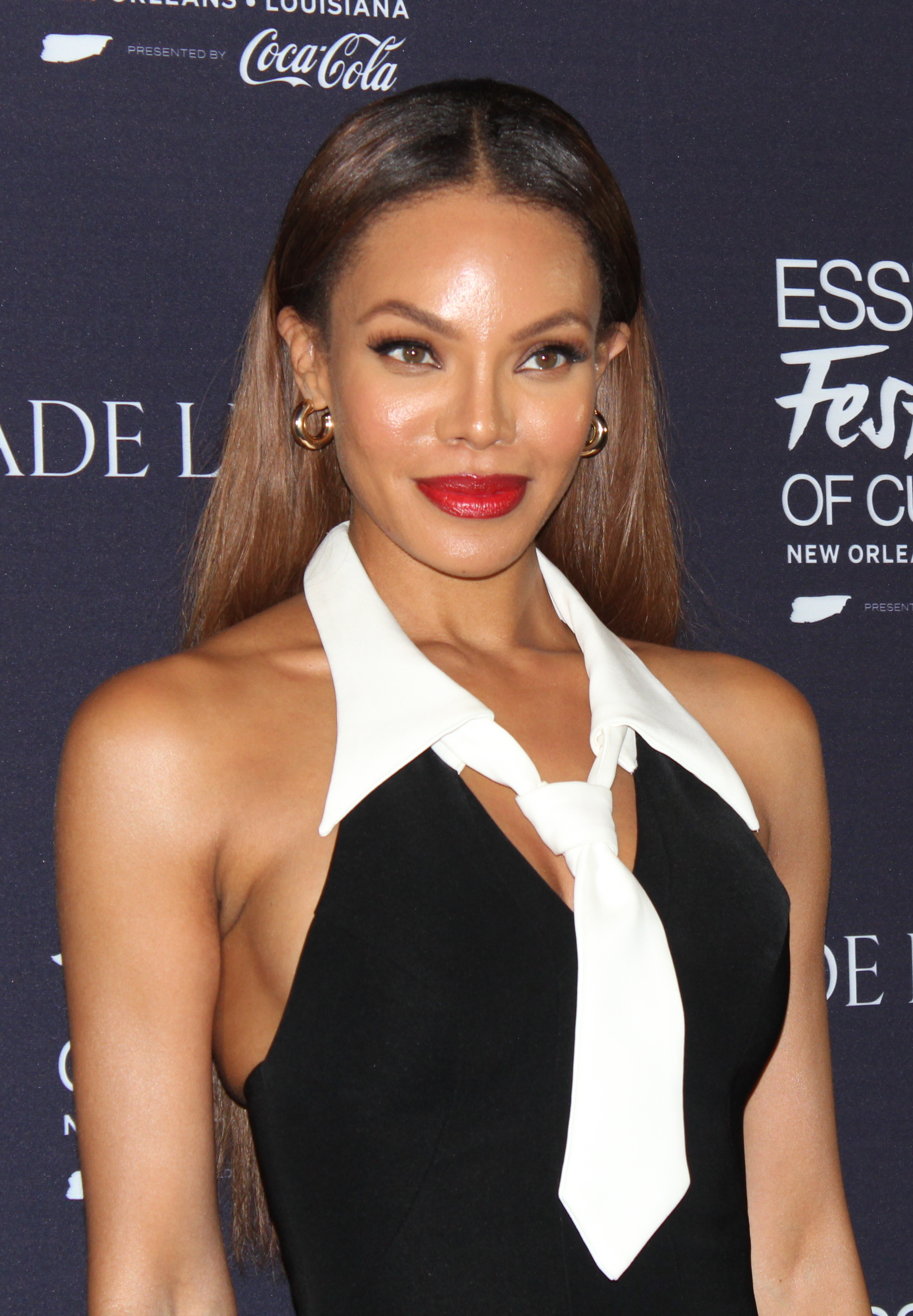
- Stewart at EssenceFest 2025 in July.
- Born: Crystle Danae Stewart; September 20, 1981 (age 45); Houston, Texas, U.S.
- Other name: Crystle Stewart Sebrechts
- Height: 5 ft 8 in (173 cm)
- Spouse: Max Sebrechts (m. 2014; div. 2024)
- Children: 2
- Beauty pageant titleholder
- Title: Miss Texas USA 2008; Miss USA 2008
- Years active: 2008-present
- Major competitions: Miss Texas USA 2008; (Winner); Miss USA 2008; (Winner); Miss Universe 2008; (Top 10)

Crystle Danae Stewart (born September 20, 1981) is an American actress and beauty pageant titleholder. Stewart began her acting career in 2011, when she played real estate agent Leslie Morris-Jetson on the OWN/TBS comedy-drama television series For Better or Worse until 2017. Shortly after, she appeared in the 2018 film Acrimony. She also won Miss Texas USA 2008, and Miss USA 2008, she represented the United States at Miss Universe 2008, where she reached in the placed Top 10.

From 2020 to 2023, Stewart was the national director of Miss USA and Miss Teen USA. She was suspended from the position following allegations of favoritism and rigging the results at Miss USA 2022, . She officially stepped down from the role in August 2023.

== Life and career ==
=== Early life ===
Crystle Danae Stewart is African American. Prior to her debut in acting proper, she appeared on the Rock ‘N Learn video Addition & Subtraction Rock.

=== Pageantry ===
Stewart won the Miss Texas USA 2008 title in a state pageant held in Laredo, Texas on July 1, 2007, after competing against 121 other contestants. At the time, she ran a party-planning and motivational speaking company and modeled professionally. She represented Texas in the Miss USA 2008 pageant held in April 2008. Stewart graduated from Elkins High School in Missouri City, and graduated from the University of Houston in 2007. Additionally, Stewart graduated from Barbizon Modeling and Acting School in Houston.

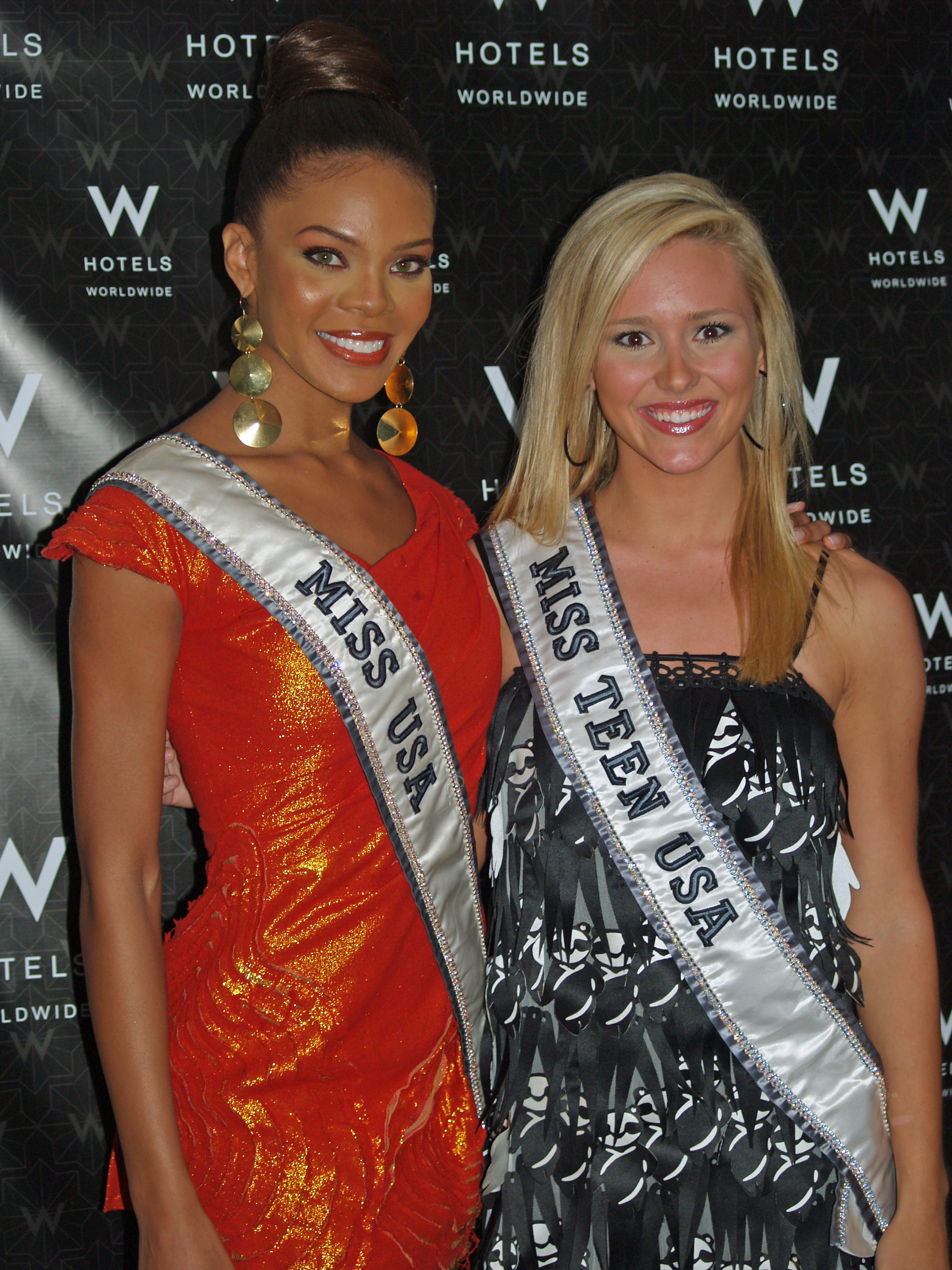
Stewart appearing with Miss Teen USA Stevi Perry at the Mercedes-Benz Fashion Week in New York, September 2008

This was Stewart's fifth attempt at the Miss Texas USA title; she had placed first runner-up in both the 2006 and 2007 events; third runner-up in 2005; and made the semi-finals in 2003. Her first appearance in the state pageant was in 2002 when she made the semi-finals of the Miss Texas USA 2003 pageant competing as Miss Fort Bend County. In 2004, Stewart again competed as Miss Fort Bend County and placed third runner-up to Tyler Willis at Miss Texas USA 2005. The following year, she competed in the Miss Houston local pageant and placed first runner-up to Lauren Lanning. She competed at Miss Texas USA 2006 as Miss Harris County, and placed first runner-up to Lanning for the second time. In 2006, she placed first runner-up to Miss Houston for a second time and, in a double repetition, placed first runner-up to Miss Houston, Magen Ellis, in the 2007 state pageant (competing as Miss Southeast Texas).

In 2007, she did not compete for a local title, and instead entered as an at large delegate for Miss Texas USA 2008, again holding the Miss Fort Bend County title. She made the final two in the state-televised pageant, alongside Miss Houston Brooke Daniels, who was also a runner-up at Miss Texas USA 2007. This time Stewart won the title and was crowned Miss Texas USA 2008. She also won the Everything but Water Swimsuit award, announced during the preliminary competition. Stewart is the second African American to win the crown at Miss Texas USA; Chelsi Smith was crowned Miss Texas USA 1995 (and later Miss USA and Miss Universe).

On April 11, 2008, Stewart represented Texas in the Miss USA 2008 pageant where she became the ninth Texan to win the Miss USA title. Throughout her reign she served for various charities, conducted media interviews and made other public appearances. On 26 April, she attended the White House Correspondents' Association dinner.

Stewart holds a degree in consumer science and merchandising from the University of Houston. Stewart is represented as a model by Neal Hamil Agency in Houston.

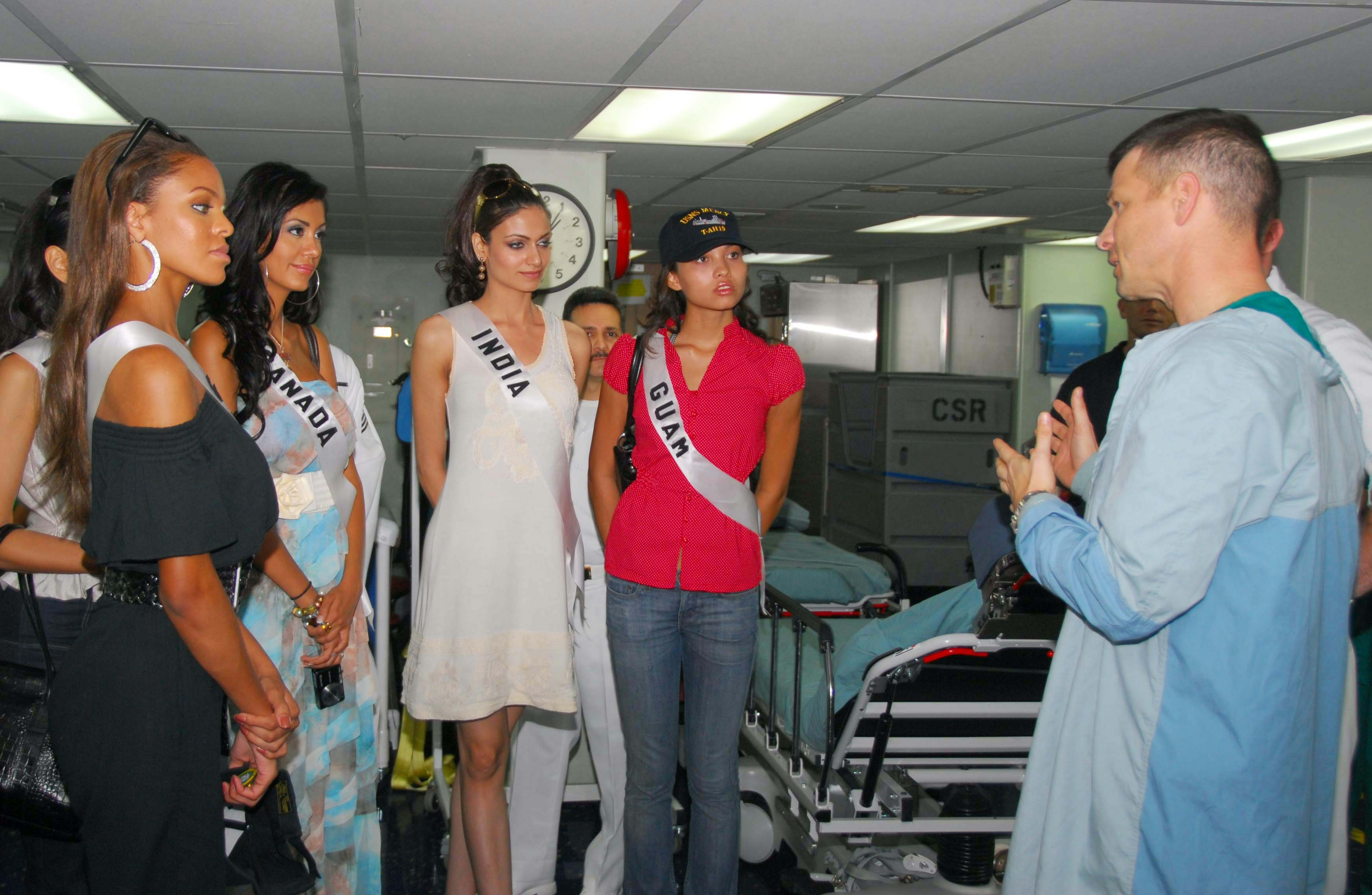
Stewart, with other Miss Universe contestants, tours USNS Mercy off the coast of Vietnam

On July 13, 2008, Stewart represented the US at the Miss Universe pageant Nha Trang, Vietnam, and advanced to the top 10. Her national costume was a star, inspired by the nickname of her home state of Texas, "The Lone Star State". Stewart became the second consecutive Miss USA, following Rachel Smith in 2007, to stumble and fall during the evening gown competition. After that, she encouraged the audience to applaud by clapping her hands. Unlike Smith, Stewart did not advance to the top five, finishing eighth overall.

In November 2020, Stewart became the national director of Miss USA and Miss Teen USA, splitting the pageants into a new independent organization away from the Miss Universe Organization. She was the first African American woman to hold this position.

In October 2022, Stewart and her company Miss Brand Corporation were suspended from their roles in organizing pageants after numerous allegations of favoritism, results rigging, and sexual harassment were leveled by former contestants. She officially stepped down from the position in August 2023.

=== Hosting ===
Stewart hosted the Miss Teen USA 2009 competition on July 31, 2009, along with Seth Goldman. On July 24, 2010, Goldman and Stewart once again hosted the Miss Teen USA pageant.

Stewart also co-hosted multiple Miss Texas USA pageants including some with her Belgian-born husband, model Max Sebrechts (married August 9, 2014), and she also co-hosted with Jason Feinberg.

Stewart served as a finals judge at the Miss USA 2016 pageant on June 5, 2016, in Las Vegas, Nevada.

=== Acting ===
In 2011, Stewart made her acting debut appearing in an episode of the sitcom House of Payne. That same year, Perry cast her as a series lead in the TBS/OWN comedy-drama series For Better or Worse playing the role of Leslie Morris for its six-season run. In 2012, Perry cast Stewart in her first film, playing the role of a secretary in Good Deeds. Again in 2017, cast her as a series regular in the short-lived TLC drama series Too Close to Home. In 2018, she was cast in Perry's thriller Acrimony. In addition to her roles in Tyler Perry productions, Stewart appeared in one episode of the television series The Exes.

In 2024, Stewart was cast as lead in the Netflix drama series, Beauty in Black.

== Personal life ==
She married Belgian model Max Sebrechts in August 2014. They have two children together. The couple divorced in 2024.

== Filmography ==
Year	Title	Role	Notes
2000	Addition & Subtraction Rock	Performer - Herself	Educational direct-to-video film for the company Rock ‘N Learn
2008	Days of Our Lives	Cameo - Herself	1 episode
2011	House of Payne	Vanessa	Episode "Payneful Visit"
2011–2017	For Better or Worse	Leslie Morris-Jetson	Main cast
2012	Good Deeds	Secretary	
2014	The Exes	Donna	Episode "Nothing in Common"
2017	Too Close to Home	Frankie	Main cast
2018	Acrimony	Diana Wells	
2024-present	Beauty in Black	Mallory Bellarie	Main cast

Awards and achievements
Preceded by Rachel Smith, Tennessee	Miss USA; 2008	Succeeded by Kristen Dalton, North Carolina
Preceded by Magen Ellis	Miss Texas USA; 2008	Succeeded by Brooke Daniels
