= Kristen Dalton (Miss USA) =

Miss USA 2009

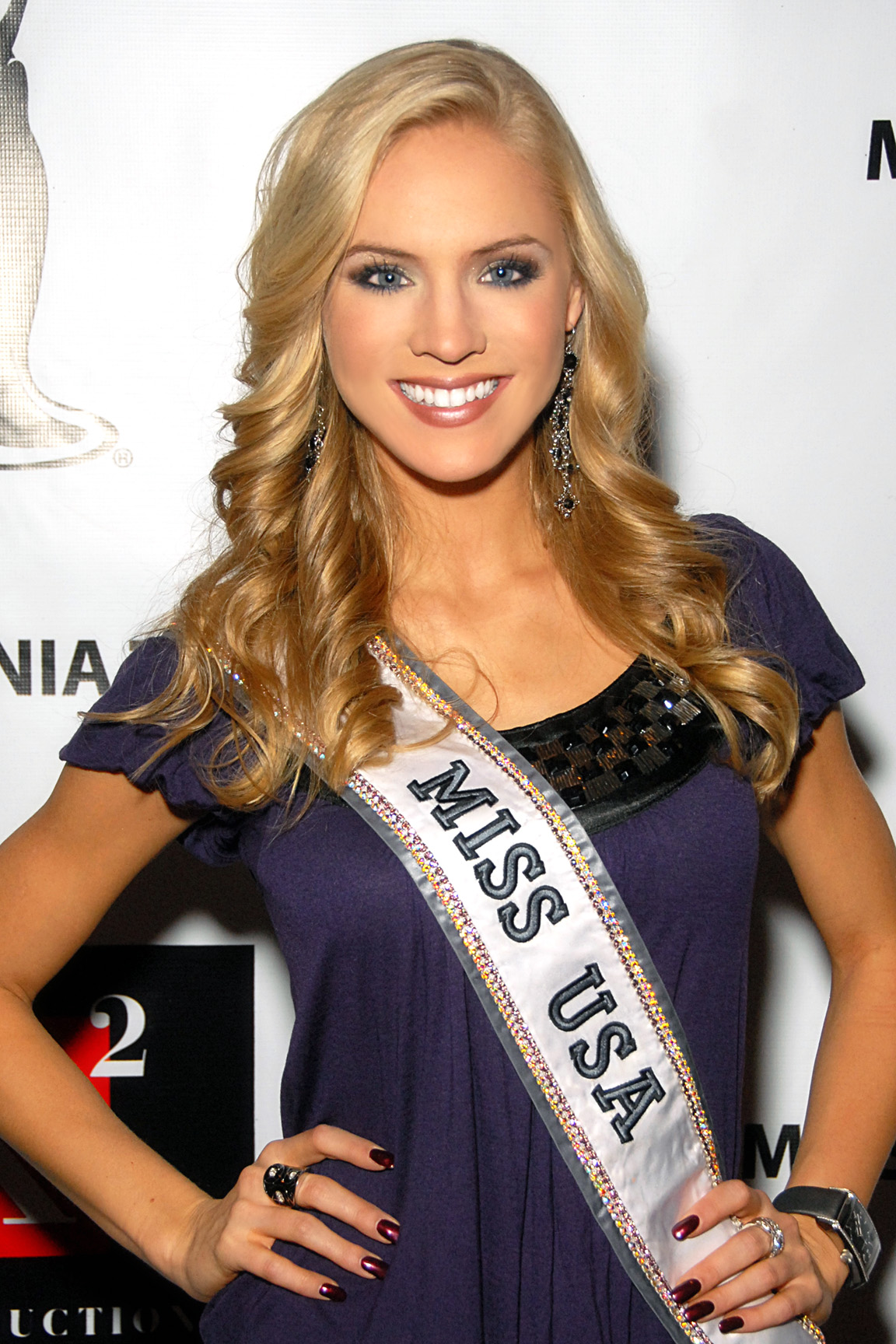
- Kristen Dalton (2009)
- Born: Kristen Jeannine Dalton; December 13, 1986 (age 39); Wilmington, North Carolina, U.S.
- Height: 5 ft 7 in (170 cm)
- Spouse: Kris Wolfe (m. 2013)
- Children: 3
- Beauty pageant titleholder
- Title: Miss North Carolina USA 2009; Miss USA 2009
- Hair color: Blonde
- Eye color: Blue
- Major competitions: Miss North Carolina Teen USA 2005 (1st Runner-Up); Miss North Carolina USA 2009 (Winner); Miss USA 2009 (Winner); Miss Universe 2009 (Top 10)

Kristen Jeannine Dalton-Wolfe (born December 13, 1986) is an American actress, model and beauty pageant titleholder who won Miss USA 2009 and represented the United States at the Miss Universe 2009 pageant.

== Pageants ==
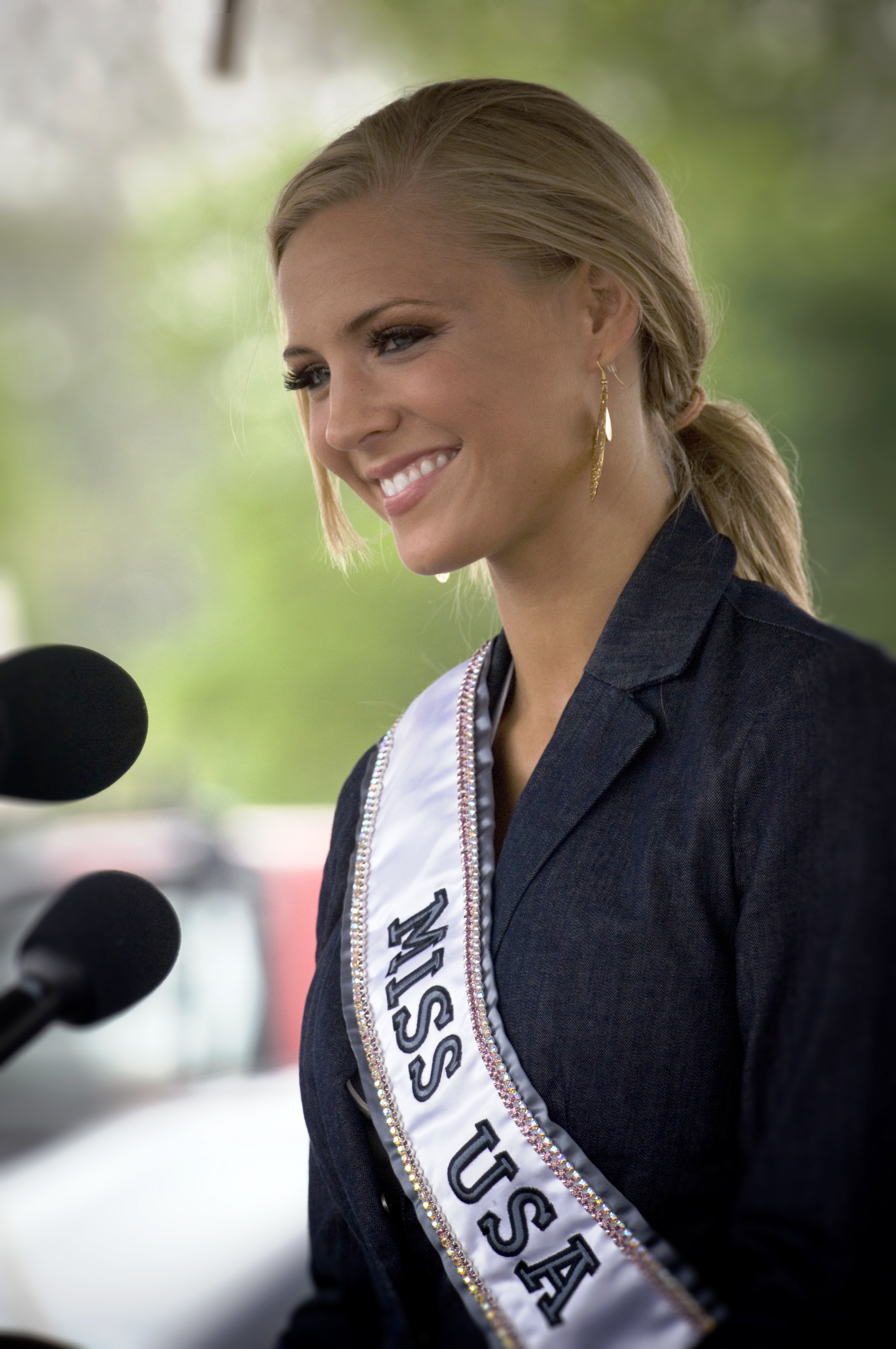
Dalton in 2009

=== Miss North Carolina USA 2009 ===
In November 2008, Dalton won the Miss North Carolina USA 2009 title in a state pageant held in High Point, North Carolina.

=== Miss USA 2009 ===
Dalton represented North Carolina in the Miss USA 2009 pageant broadcast live from Planet Hollywood in Las Vegas, Nevada, where she became the second Miss North Carolina USA to win the Miss USA title; the state's only prior winner was Chelsea Cooley, Miss USA 2005. Dalton won both the swimsuit and evening gown competitions during the final pageant competition, and was crowned by former titleholder Crystle Stewart of Texas.

=== Miss Universe 2009 ===
Dalton represented the United States in the Miss Universe 2009 pageant, held at the Atlantis Paradise Island Resort in the Bahamas. Her national costume was a NASCAR driver. She finished in 10th place overall.

== Other ventures ==
In 2009, Dalton appeared as a contestant on Are You Smarter Than a 5th Grader.

Dalton is a public advocate for Children International. Dalton is the founding editor of She is MORE, an faith-based online women's magazine. She is the author of Rise Up, Princess: 60 Days To Revealing Her Royal Identity and Rise Up With God: The Guided Journal. Dalton is the host of Hot Off the Press on JUCE TV, TBN's sister network for millennials. Her show was a reach of 90 million worldwide. She has also done international print and commercial campaigns.

== Personal life ==
Dalton is the daughter of Jeannine Dalton (née Boger), who was Miss North Carolina USA 1982. Her younger sister, Kenzie, also competed in the Miss North Carolina Teen USA 2005 pageant and was a runner-up. Her other sister, Julia, was Miss North Carolina Teen USA 2008, placed second runner-up at Miss Teen USA 2008, and competed at Miss USA 2015. The Daltons are the only family to have a mother and two daughters win the same title.

Dalton graduated from Hoggard High School in 2005. Dalton majored in psychology and Spanish at East Carolina University.

She dated Reid Rosenthal, who appeared in the fifth season of The Bachelorette. The couple broke up in March 2012. She is currently married to Kris Wolfe.

Awards and achievements
Preceded by Crystle Stewart	Miss USA; 2009	Succeeded by Rima Fakih
Preceded by Andrea Duke	Miss North Carolina USA; 2010	Succeeded by Nadia Moffett
