= Miss North Carolina Teen USA =

Beauty contest

- Formation: 1983
- Type: Beauty pageant
- Headquarters: Charlotte
- Location: North Carolina
- Members: Miss Teen USA
- Official language: English
- Website: Official website

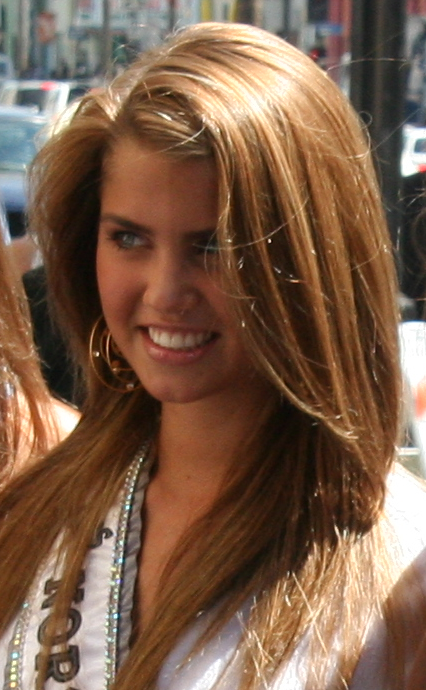
Katie Coble, Miss North Carolina Teen USA 2007 & Miss North Carolina USA 2017

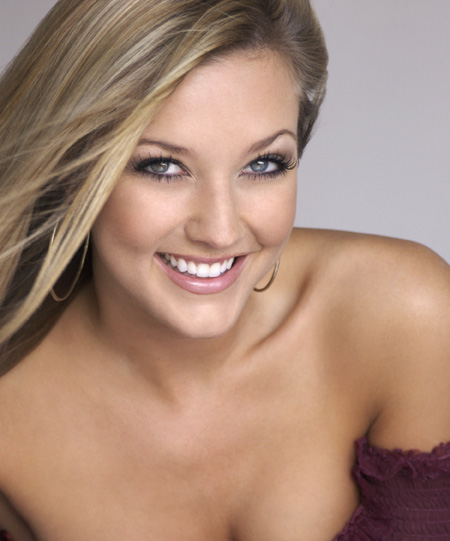
Erin O'Kelley, Miss North Carolina Teen USA 2001 & Miss North Carolina USA 2007

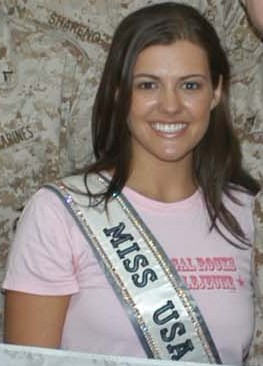
Miss USA 2005 Chelsea Cooley from North Carolina, also Miss North Carolina Teen USA 2000

The Miss North Carolina Teen USA competition is the pageant that selects the representative for the state of North Carolina in the Miss Teen USA pageant and is part of the RPM Productions group.

North Carolina has been moderately successful at Miss Teen USA, but has never won the title. Their best placement was in 1987, 2006 and 2016 when Peggy Blackwell, Melissa Lingafelt and Emily Wakeman placed first runner-up respectively. North Carolina's greatest success came from the mid-1980s to early 1990s. North Carolina, along with Illinois and Florida, has the most Miss Photogenic award winners in the pageant with three each.

Six Miss North Carolina Teen USA's has crossed over to win the Miss North Carolina USA title. The first was Chelsea Cooley, who went on to win the Miss USA title and place in the top 10 at Miss Universe. The second was Erin O' Kelley, Miss North Carolina Teen USA 2001 who made the top 15 at Miss USA 2007. The third was Julia Dalton who was a second runner up in Miss Teen USA 2008. However, she didn't place at Miss USA 2015. And the fourth was Katie Coble, a second runner up in Miss Teen USA 2007 and a non finalist in Miss USA 2017. The fifth was Jane Axhoj, a second runner up in Miss Teen USA 2015. The sixth was McKenzie Hansley in 2024 placing in the top 20.

Kristen Dalton, who came in first-runner up at the 2005 Miss North Carolina Teen USA pageant to Nikkie Groat, went on to win Miss North Carolina USA in 2009, and won the title of Miss USA 2009. She represented the United States at the Miss Universe pageant in August 2009. Her younger sister Kenzie Dalton, who was first-runner up at the 2006 Miss North Carolina Teen USA pageant, became engaged to actor Chad Michael Murray the same year she placed first-runner up to Melissa Lingafelt (who placed first-runner to Katie Blair of Montana at Miss Teen USA 2006.) Their mother, Jeannie Dalton (Boger) was Miss North Carolina USA 1982, and their sister Julia Dalton was Miss North Carolina Teen USA 2008, and placed second-runner up to Stevi Perry of Arkansas at Miss Teen USA 2008. Julia was Miss North Carolina USA in 2015 and didn't place at the Miss USA 2015 pageant.

Their most recent placement came in 2022, when Gabriela Ortega placed in the top 16.

Trinity Locklear of Lumberton was crowned Miss North Carolina Teen USA 2026 on June 28, 2026, at The Spartanburg Marriott Hotel in Spartanburg. She will represent North Carolina at Miss Teen USA 2026.

== Results summary ==
=== Placements ===
- 1st runners-up: Peggy Blackwell (1987), Melissa Lingafelt (2006), Emily Wakeman (2016)
- 2nd runners-up: Katie Coble (2007), Julia Dalton (2008), Jane Axhoj (2015)
- 4th runner-up: Kaaviya Sambasivam (2018)
- Top 6: Holly Furman (1991), Rachel Adcock (1992), Ali Burr (1997)
- Top 10: Tracey Kaggell (1984), Kimberly Jordan (1985)
- Top 16: Kat Puryear (2012), Peyton Brown (2020), Gabriela Ortega (2022)

North Carolina holds a record of 15 placements at Miss Teen USA.

=== Awards ===
- Miss Congeniality: Holly Furman (1991)
- Miss Photogenic: Rachel Adcock (1992), Melissa Lingafelt (2006), Gabriela Ortega (2022)

== Winners ==
Color key

- Declared as Winner
- Ended as runner-up
- Ended as one of the finalists or semifinalists

Year	Name	Hometown	Age^{1}	Local title	Placement at MTUSA	Special awards at MTUSA	Notes
2026	Trinity Locklear	Lumberton	16	Miss Lumberton Teen			
2025	Caroline Holmes	Chattanooga, TN	17	Miss Mount Olive Teen			Later 2026 America's Ideal Miss Teen
2024	Kaylee Stavlas	Smithfield	17	Miss City of Oaks Teen			
2023	Katie Setzer	Hickory	17	Miss Mountain View Teen			
2022	Gabriela Ortega	Raleigh	16	Miss Wake County Teen	Top 16		
2021	Madison Grace "Madi" Walker	Garner	18	Miss Garner Teen			Previously Miss Teen World America 2019
2020	Peyton Brown	Dunn	18	Miss Tri-County Teen	Top 16		1st runner-up at Miss North Carolina's Outstanding Teen 2018: Previously Miss North Carolina World 2019
2019	Eliza Minor	Harrisburg	15	Miss Harrisburg Teen			
2018	Kaaviya Sambasivam	Winston-Salem	18	Miss Forsyth County Teen	4th runner-up		
2017	McKenzie "Kenzie" Hansley	Hampstead	17	Miss Topsail Island Teen			Previously Miss North Carolina's Outstanding Teen 2015; Later Miss North Carolina Collegiate America 2019; Later Miss District of Columbia Collegiate America 2020; Later Miss North Carolina USA 2024; Top 20 at Miss USA 2024
2016	Emily Wakeman	Cornelius	18	Miss North Charlotte Teen	1st runner-up		4th runner-up at Miss South Carolina 2021
2015	Jane Madison Axhoj	Charlotte	16	Miss South Charlotte Teen	2nd runner-up		Later Miss North Carolina USA 2020
2014	Pamela Michelle "Pammy" Peters	Raleigh	17	Miss Charlotte Teen			
2013	Kelsey Barberio	Chapel Hill	18	Miss Chapel Hill Teen			
2012	Katherine "Kat" Puryear	Thomasville	18	Miss Thomasville Teen	Top 16		Previously Miss North Carolina's Outstanding Teen 2009; 3rd runner-up at the Miss America's Outstanding Teen 2010 pageant
2011	Vanessa McClelland	Fayetteville	18				
2010	Lauren Ashley Martz	Salisbury	16				
2009	Scarlett Howell	Ansonville	16				
2008	Julia Dalton	Wilmington	16		2nd runner-up		Later Miss North Carolina USA 2015; Daughter of Jeannie Dalton Boger, Miss North Carolina USA 1982; Sister of Kristen Dalton, Miss USA 2009
2007	Kaitlin "Katie" Coble	Matthews	17		2nd runner-up		Later Miss North Carolina USA 2017
2006	Melissa Gayle Lingafelt	Concord	16		1st runner-up	Miss Photogenic	
2005	Nikkie Groat	Matthews	17				
2004	Elizabeth Claire Carty	High Point	17				1st runner-up at Miss North Carolina Teen USA 2002; Later Miss United States Teen 2005
2003	Erin Elizabeth Hendricks	High Point	18				
2002	Brittany Davis Crews	Wake Forest	15				1st runner-up at Miss North Carolina USA 2008 pageant
2001	Erin O'Kelley	Asheville	15				Later Miss North Carolina USA 2007; Top 15 at Miss USA 2007
2000	Chelsea Scott Cooley	Charlotte	16				Later Miss North Carolina USA 2005; Miss USA 2005; 9th at Miss Universe 2005; Miss United States Teen 2001; 1st runner-up at Miss Teen International 2001
1999	Stephanie Holt	Albemarle	18				
1998	Lucy Parker	Denver	19				
1997	Alison "Ali" Burr	Stanfield	17		Finalist		4th runner-up at Miss North Carolina USA 2000
1996	Tammy Ashton	Gastonia	19				
1995	Meridith Jackson	High Point	18				
1994	Valarie Beasley	Dunn	16				
1993	Wendy Williams	Wade	15				Sister of Heidi Sue Williams, Miss North Carolina 1992
1992	Rachel Adcock	Conover	17		Top 6	Miss Photogenic	
1991	Holly Furman	Boone	17		Top 6	Miss Congeniality	
1990	Heather Simmons	Wilmington	16				
1989	Kelly Sheppard	Leicester	17				
1988	Michelle Moore	Fuquay-Varina	18				
1987	Peggy Blackwell	Fayetteville	17		1st runner-up		
1986	Denise Jenkins	Wilmington	16				
1985	Kimberly Jordan	Wilmington	17		Top 10		
1984	Tracey Kaggell	Waynesville	17		Top 10		
1983	Janet Elaine Freeman	Leicester	16				

^{1} Age at the time of the Miss Teen USA pageant
