= Miss North Carolina USA =

Beauty pageant competition

- Formation: 1952
- Type: Beauty pageant
- Headquarters: Aiken
- Location: South Carolina
- Members: Miss USA
- Official language: English
- Key people: Ariana Blaize
- Website: Official website

The Miss North Carolina USA competition is the pageant that selects the representative for the state North Carolina in the Miss USA pageant. This state is part of the RPM Productions group since 1992. In 2025 and onwards, the pageant is now produced and directed by Ariana Blaize, Miss Universe Guyana 2024, under A Blaize Productions alongside the rest of former RPM states.

In 2005, Miss North Carolina USA Chelsea Cooley won the Miss USA crown and placed in the top 10 at Miss Universe. Cooley is the first former Miss North Carolina Teen USA to win the Miss title, although not the first to have competed at Miss Teen USA. The second Miss North Carolina Teen USA to win the Miss title was Erin O'Kelley in 2007. She went on to place in the top 15 at Miss USA 2007. Similar to the Miss Utah USA titleholders, both Cooley and Kelley placed at Miss USA, eclipsing their teen performances. In 2009, Kristen Dalton became the second woman from North Carolina to be crowned Miss USA. In 2019, Cheslie Kryst became the third woman from the state to win Miss USA. In both occasions, they placed top 10 on their respective Miss Universe pageants. The most recent placement was Jordyn McKey placing Top 20 in 2023.

North Carolina is currently third tied with Idaho in number of former teens have competed in this pageant: eight, after Indiana and Virginia, including three competed at Rhode Island, Vermont and Virginia, respectively. In addition, two others have also competed at Miss America.

In 2019 (billed as 2020 pageant), Madeline Delp was the first woman in a wheelchair to win the top 10 finalists in a statewide Miss USA pageant.

Brittany Boltinhouse of Wilmington was crowned Miss North Carolina USA 2026 on June 28, 2026, at The Spartanburg Marriott Hotel in Spartanburg. She intended to represent North Carolina at Miss USA 2026. However, on August 5, 2026, she was dethroned due to a violation of conduct. Therefore, leaving Myla Hadley of Charlotte assuming the title of Miss North Carolina USA 2026.

== Gallery of titleholders ==
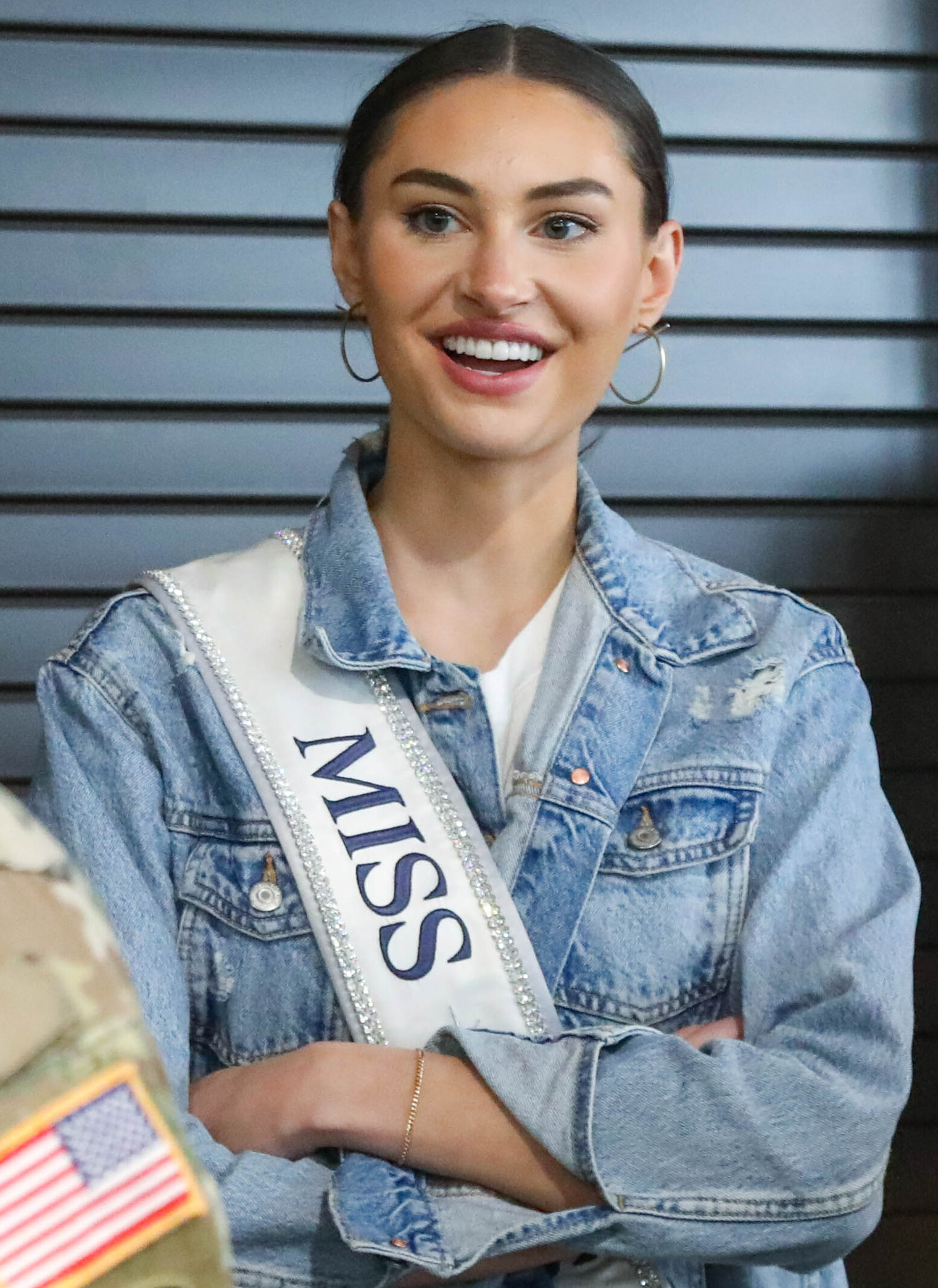
Morgan Romano, Miss North Carolina USA 2022 and became Miss USA 2022 after R'Bonney Gabriel became Miss Universe 2022

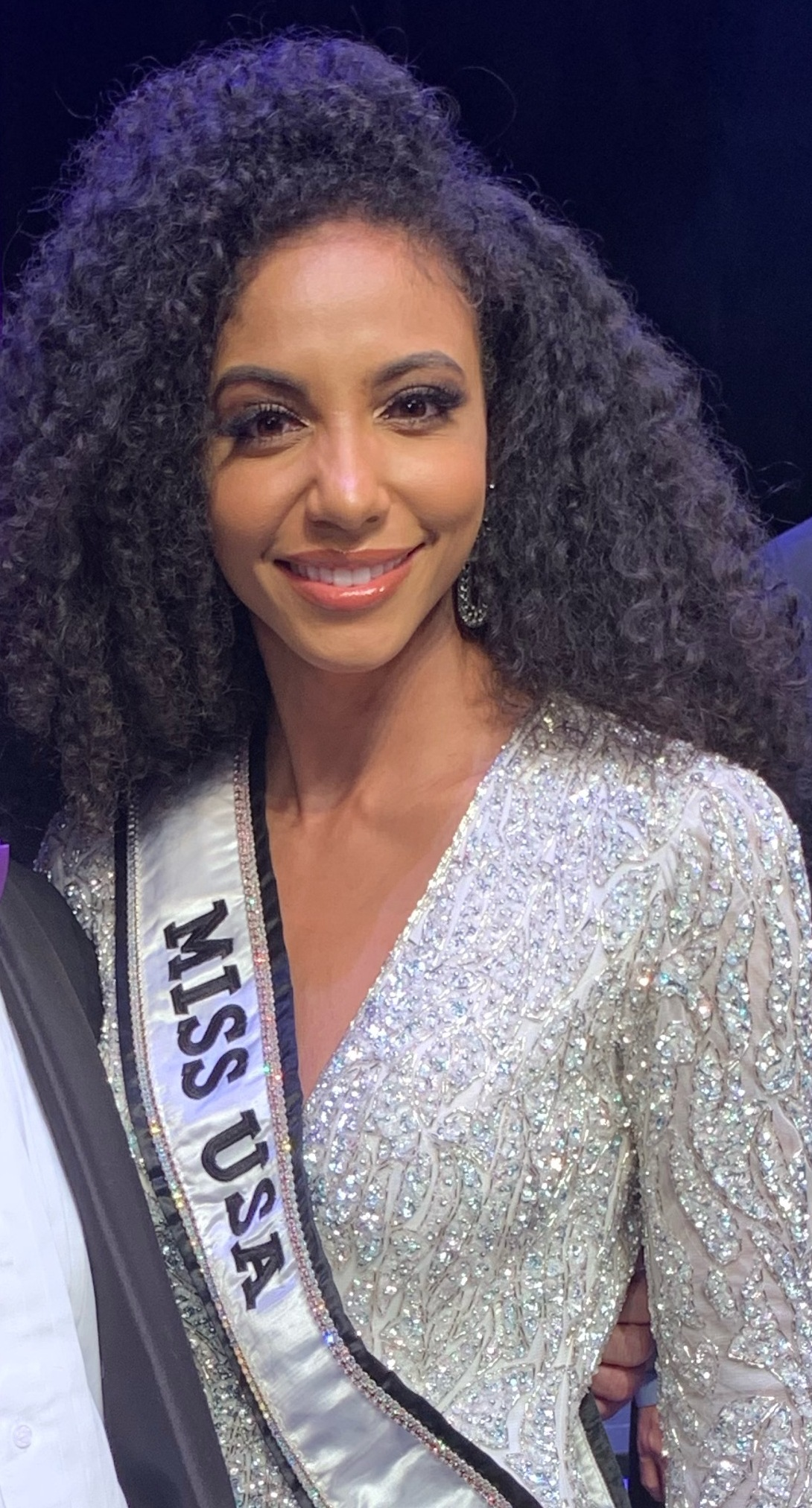
Cheslie Kryst, Miss North Carolina USA 2019 and Miss USA 2019

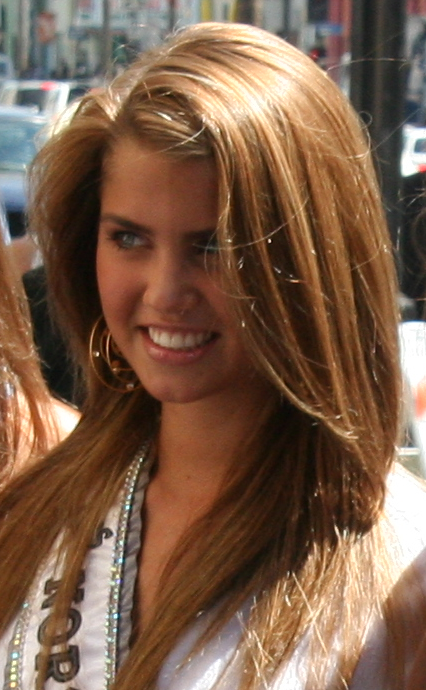
Katie Coble, Miss North Carolina USA 2017 and Miss North Carolina Teen USA 2007

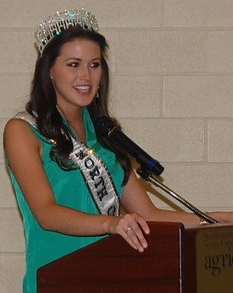
Sydney Perry, Miss North Carolina USA 2012

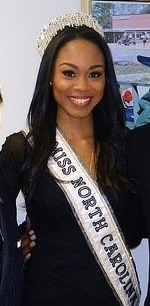
Ashley Love-Mills, Miss North Carolina USA 2013

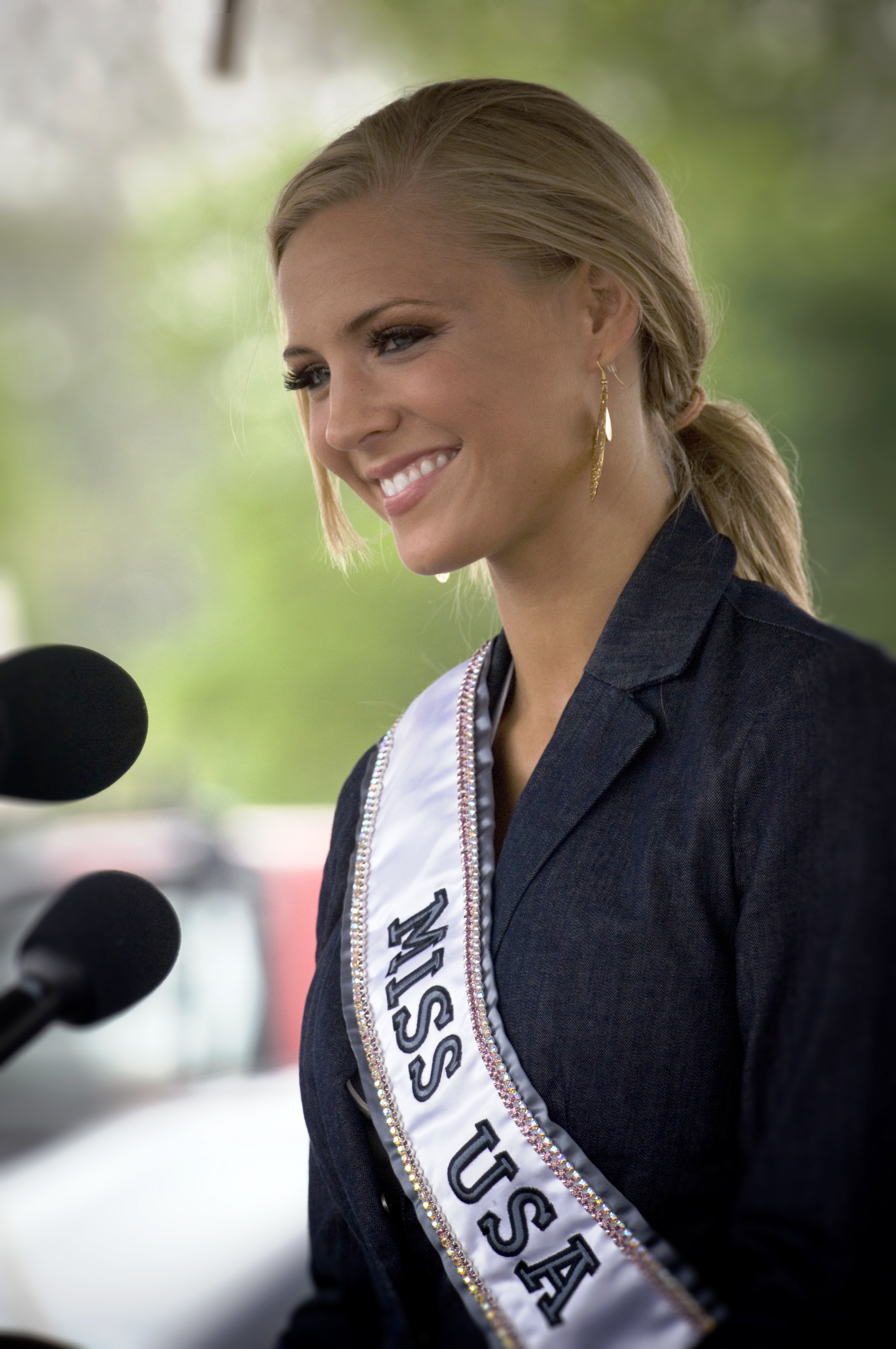
Kristen Dalton, Miss North Carolina USA 2009 and Miss USA 2009

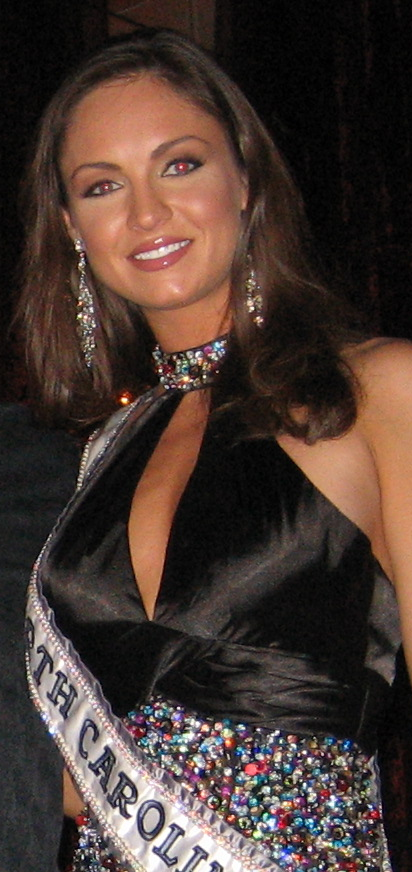
Andrea Duke, Miss North Carolina USA 2008

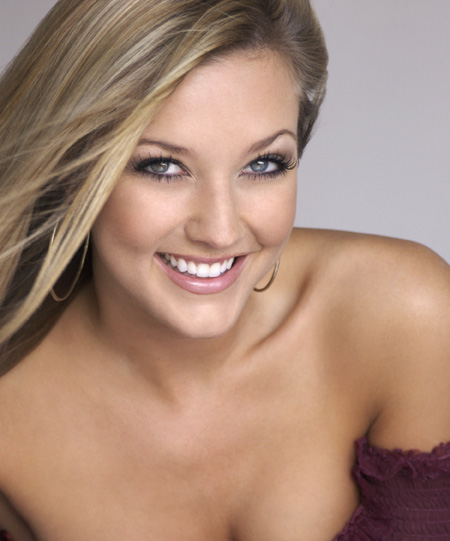
Erin O'Kelley, Miss North Carolina Teen USA 2001 and Miss North Carolina USA 2007

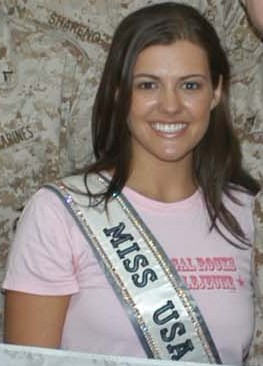
Chelsea Cooley, Miss North Carolina Teen USA 2000, Miss North Carolina USA 2005 and Miss USA 2005

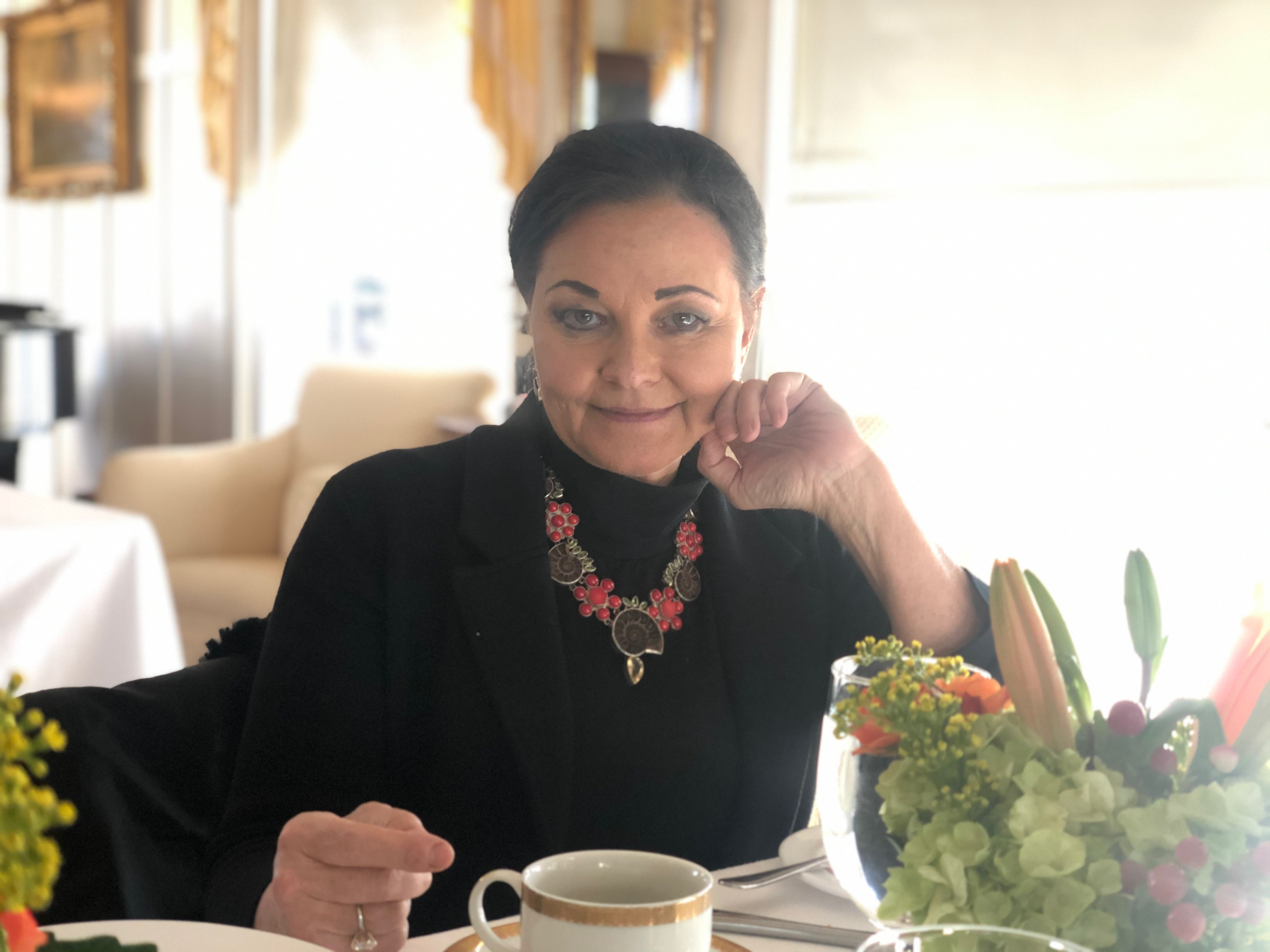
Vikki Verbyla, Miss North Carolina USA 1977

== Results summary ==
=== Placements ===
- Miss USAs: Chelsea Cooley (2005), Kristen Dalton (2009), Cheslie Kryst (2019)
- 1st runners-up: Caelynn Miller-Keyes (2018), Morgan Romano (2022) (Note: Morgan Romano was originally 1st runner-up in Miss USA 2022 but assumed title after the winner relinquished her title due to winning Miss Universe 2022.)
- 2nd runners-up: Constance Ann Dorn (1975), Lynn Jenkins (1994), Ashley Puleo (2004)
- 3rd runners-up: Lyndia Ann Tarlton (1960)
- 4th runners-up: Marcia Burton (1974)
- Top 6/8: Pat Arnold (1991), Madison Bryant (2021)
- Top 10/11/12: Deborah Ann Falls (1972), Dianne Jamerson (1979), Cookie Noak (1984), Rhonda Nobles (1986), Tess Elliott (1992), Ashley Love-Mills (2013)
- Top 15/20: Shirley Bagwell (1956), Erin O'Kelley (2007), Jordyn McKey (2023), Kenzie Hansley (2024)

North Carolina holds a record of 22 placements at Miss USA.

=== Awards ===
- Miss Photogenic: Pat Arnold (1991)
- Miss Congeniality: Vera Morris (1998), Monica Palumbo (2001)

== Winners ==
Color key

- Declared as Winner
- Ended as runner-up
- Ended as one of the finalists or semifinalists

Year	Name	Hometown	Age (Note: Age at the time of the Miss USA pageant)	Local title	Placement at Miss USA	Special awards at Miss USA	Notes
2026	Myla Hadley	Charlotte	24	Miss Charlotte			Originally 1st runner-up, assumed title after the emergence of past inflammatory social media posts created by Boltinhouse
2026	Brittany Boltinhouse	Beulaville	27	Miss Wilmington	Unable to compete; dethroned due to the emergence of past controversial social media posts		
2025	Lourdes "Lulu" Madera	Raleigh	39	Miss Raleigh			
2024	McKenzie "Kenzie" Hansley	Charlotte	24	Miss South Park	Top 20		Previously Miss North Carolina Teen USA 2017; Previously Miss North Carolina's Outstanding Teen 2015
2023	Jordyn Ashlee McKey	Charlotte	25	Miss Uptown	Top 20		
2022	Morgan Renee Romano	Concord	23	Miss Queen City	1st runner-up		Became Miss USA 2022 after R'Bonney Gabriel became Miss Universe 2022
2021	Madison Alexis Bryant	Fayetteville	24	Miss Metrolina	Top 8		
2020	Jane Madison Axhoj	Waxhaw	22	Miss Lake Wylie			Previously Miss North Carolina Teen USA 2015; 2nd runner-up at Miss Teen USA 2015; Later New England Patriots Cheerleader
2019	Laura Little	Charlotte	23	Miss Mount Holly	did not compete		Originally first runner-up, assumed the title when Cheslie Kryst won Miss USA; Charlotte Honey Bees dancer; Sister of Courtney Little, Miss Teen North Carolina United States 2017
2019	Cheslie Kryst	Charlotte	27	Miss Metrolina	Miss USA 2019		Top 10 at Miss Universe 2019
2018	Caelynn Miller-Keyes	Asheville	22	Miss Asheville	1st runner-up		Previously Miss Virginia Teen USA 2013; Reality TV contestant on The Bachelor (season 23) and Bachelor in Paradise (season 6)
2017	Kaitlin "Katie" Coble	Charlotte	26	Miss Weddington			Previously Miss North Carolina Teen USA 2007; 2nd runner-up at Miss Teen USA 2007
2016	Devin Gant	Charlotte	24	Miss Harrisburg			Originally 1st runner-up, assumed the title after Allie Dunn's resignation and competed in Miss USA
2016	Allison "Allie" Dunn	Stallings	21	Miss Stallings	did not compete		Resigned the title a couple of weeks before the Miss USA 2016 pageant due to illness
2015	Julia Dalton	Wilmington	23	Miss Wilmington			Previously Miss North Carolina Teen USA 2008; 2nd runner-up at Miss Teen USA 2008; Sister of Kristen Dalton, Miss USA 2009; Daughter of Jeannie Boger, Miss North Carolina USA 1982
2014	Olivia Olvera	Fayetteville	26	Miss Fayetteville			
2013	Ashley Love-Mills	Raleigh	24	Miss Raleigh Durham	Top 10		
2012	Sydney Perry	Wilmington	21	Miss Wilmington			Previously Miss Vermont Teen USA 2008
2011	Brittany York	Wilmington	22				
2010	Nadia Moffett	High Point	24				
2009	Kristen Dalton	Wilmington	21		Miss USA 2009		Top 10 at Miss Universe 2009; Sister of Miss North Carolina Teen USA 2008 and Miss North Carolina USA 2015, Julia Dalton; Daughter of Miss North Carolina USA 1982, Jeannie Boger; 1st runner-up at Miss North Carolina Teen USA 2005
2008	Andrea Duke	Hendersonville	25				Contestant at National Sweetheart 2006
2007	Erin O'Kelley	Asheville	21		Top 15		Previously Miss North Carolina Teen USA 2001
2006	Samantha Holvey	Buies Creek/ Glenville, WV	20				On Oct. 14, 2016 Holvey told CNN that Donald Trump personally inspected each woman prior to the contest
2005	Chelsea Cooley	Charlotte	21		Miss USA 2005		Top 10 at Miss Universe 2005; Previously Miss North Carolina Teen USA 2000; Miss United States Teen 2001; 1st runner-up at Miss Teen International 2001
2004	Ashley Puleo	Pinehurst	25		2nd runner-up		Sister of Laura Puleo, Miss Virginia USA 2015
2003	Kristen Luneberg	Durham	22				Previously Miss Rhode Island Teen USA 1998
2002	Alison English	Archdale	22				
2001	Monica Palumbo	Charlotte	19			Miss Congeniality	
2000	Portia Johnson	Greensboro	24				
1999	Joy Hall	Sanford	24				
1998	Vera Morris	Nashville	23			Miss Congeniality	
1997	Crystal McLaurin-Coney	Durham					
1996	Jessica McMinn	Tuxedo					
1995	Michelle Mauney	Stanley					Previously Miss North Carolina World 1994; Top 7 finalist in Miss World America 1994
1994	Lynn Jenkins	Gastonia	26		2nd runner-up		Mother of Juliana Morehouse, Miss Maine USA 2023
1993	Christa Tyson	Monroe					
1992	Tess Elliott	High Point	20		Top 11		Died in a sky-diving accident only weeks after the conclusion of her reign
1991	Pat Arnold	Chapel Hill	21		Top 6	Miss Photogenic	
1990	Altman Allen	Shelby					
1989	Jacqueline Padgette	Hobgood					
1988	Tammy Lynn Tolar	Fayetteville					Fourth runner-up at Miss North Carolina USA 1987
1987	Donna Leigh Wilson	Davidson	21				
1986	Rhonda Nobles	Fayetteville	20		Top 10		
1985	Kate Kenney	Raleigh					
1984	Cookie Noak	Hickory	23		Top 10		
1983	Allison Payge Pinson	Mooresville					
1982	Jeannie Boger	Sanford					Mother of Miss USA 2009 Kristen Dalton (Miss North Carolina USA 2009) and Miss North Carolina Teen USA 2008 Julia Dalton (second runner-up at Miss Teen USA 2008)
1981	Lisa Swift	Southport					
1980	Lori Boggs	Kannapolis					
1979	Dianne Jamerson	Asheville	24		Top 12		
1978	Kathryn Norman	Charlotte					
1977	Vikki Verbyla	Lenoir					
1976	Dianne Bowen	Windsor					
1975	Constance Dorn	Kinston	21		2nd runner-up		Previously Miss North Carolina 1972; 1st runner up to Miss America 1973
1974	Marcia Patrice Burton	Hickory	21		4th runner-up		
1973	Vivian Craig	Stanley					
1972	Deborah Falls	Vale	21		Top 12		
1971	Mary Elinor Rudroff	Winston-Salem	21				
1970	Susan Bodsford	Ramseur					
1969	Faye Bass	Durham	19				Received United Artist Special Talent Award
1968	Kelli Moore	Raleigh					
1967	Patti Effron	Jacksonville					
1966	Brenda Faye Moye	Raleigh	21				
1965	Sandra Farmer	Greensboro					
1964	Did not compete						
1963	Trudy Cauthen	Newton					
1962	Brenda Smith	Charlotte					
1961	Marie Clyburn	Charlotte					
1960	Lyndia Tarlton	Wingate	19		3rd runner-up		
1959	Peggy Brown	Sunbury					
1958	Carol Edwards	Elizabeth City					
1957	Peggy Dennis	Lilesville					
1956	Shirley Bagwell	Raleigh	18		Top 15		
1955	Mary Ratliffe	Wadesboro					
1954	Ann Pickett	Charlotte					
1953	Libby Walker	Wilton					
1952	Doris Stanley	Greensboro					
