= Miss USA 2005 =

54th Miss USA pageant

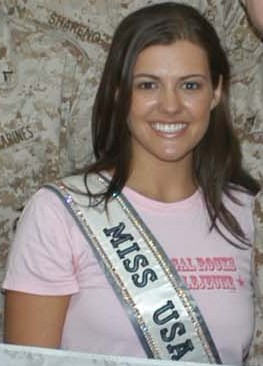
- Miss USA 2005 Chelsea Cooley
- Date: April 11, 2005
- Presenters: Nancy O'Dell; Billy Bush
- Venue: Hippodrome Theatre, Baltimore, Maryland
- Broadcaster: NBC; WBAL-TV
- Entrants: 51
- Placements: 15
- Winner: Chelsea Cooley; North Carolina

Miss USA 2005 was the 54th Miss USA pageant, held in Baltimore, Maryland on April 11, 2005. It was won by Chelsea Cooley of North Carolina.

Fifty-one state titleholders competed for the title of Miss USA in the Hippodrome Theatre on April 11, 2005. The hosts were Access Hollywood stars Nancy O'Dell and Billy Bush.

This was the first of two years the pageant was held in Maryland, as it was held in Los Angeles, California in 2004. The new location was announced in October 2004.

== Judges ==
The celebrity panel of final competition judges was announced on 10 March 2005. The judges were:

- Michael Phelps – Olympic gold medalist swimmer
- Molly Sims – Star of NBC show Las Vegas
- Sugar Ray Leonard – Boxer
- Frederic Fekkai – Beauty expert
- Pamela Dennis – Fashion designer
- Raj Bhakta – The Apprentice contestant
- Ksenia Maksimova – Model
- Brody Hutzler – Actor on Days of Our Lives

== Delegates ==
The Miss USA 2005 delegates were:

- Alabama – Jessica Tinney
- Alaska – Aleah Scheick
- Arizona – Mariana Loya
- Arkansas – Jessica Furrer
- California – Brittany Hogan
- Colorado – Lauren Cisneros
- Connecticut – Melissa Mandak
- Delaware – Sheena Benton
- District of Columbia – Sarah-Elizabeth Langford
- Florida – Melissa Witek
- Georgia – Tanisha Brito
- Hawaii – Jennifer Fairbank
- Idaho – Sade Aiyeku
- Illinois – Jill Gulseth
- Indiana – Kaitlyn Christopher
- Iowa – Joy Robinson
- Kansas – Rachel Saunders
- Kentucky – Kristen Johnson
- Louisiana – Candice Stewart
- Maine – Erica Commeau
- Maryland – Marina Harrison
- Massachusetts – Cristina Nardozzi
- Michigan – Crystal Hayes
- Minnesota – Carrie Lee
- Mississippi – Jennifer Adcock
- Missouri – Andrea Ciliberti
- Montana – Amanda Kimmel
- Nebraska – Jana Murrell
- Nevada – Shivonn Geeb
- New Hampshire – Candace Glickman
- New Jersey – Sylvia Pogorzelski
- New Mexico – Jacqueline Deaner
- New York – Meaghan Jarensky
- North Carolina – Chelsea Cooley
- North Dakota – Chrissa Miller
- Ohio – Aisha Berry
- Oklahoma – Laci Scott
- Oregon – Jessica Carlson
- Pennsylvania – Brenda Brabham
- Rhode Island – Allison Paganetti
- South Carolina – Sarah Medley
- South Dakota – Jessica Fjerstad
- Tennessee – Amy Colley
- Texas – Tyler Willis
- Utah – Marin Poole
- Vermont – Amanda Mitteer
- Virginia – Jennifer Pitts
- Washington – Amy Crawford
- West Virginia – Kristin Morrison
- Wisconsin – Melissa Ann Young
- Wyoming – Abby Norman

== See also ==
- Miss Teen USA 2005
- Miss Universe 2005
