= Chelsea Cooley =

American actress, singer, model and beauty pageant titleholder

Chelsea Cooley Altman
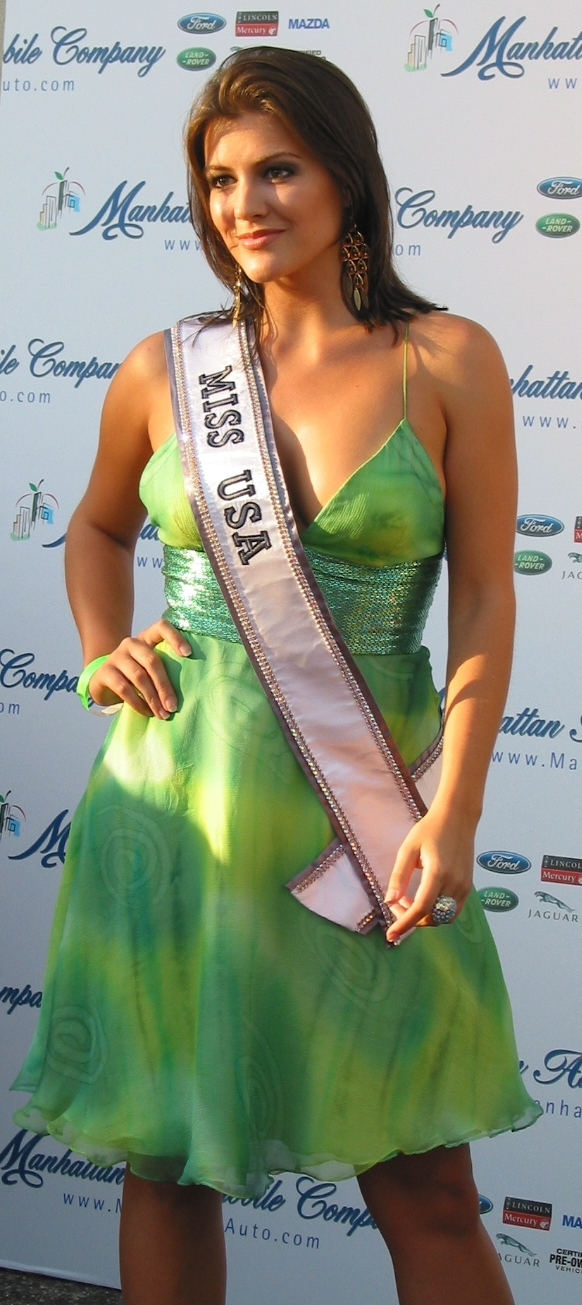
- Cooley in 2005
- Born: Chelsea Scott Cooley; October 30, 1983 (age 42); Charlotte, North Carolina, U.S.
- Height: 5 ft 7 in (1.70 m)
- Spouse: Heath Altman (m. 2008)
- Children: 2
- Beauty pageant titleholder
- Title: Miss North Carolina Teen USA 2000; Miss North Carolina USA 2005; Miss USA 2005
- Hair color: Brown
- Eye color: Brown
- Major competitions: Miss Teen USA 2000; Miss Teen International 2001 (1st runner-up); Miss Universe 2005 (Top 10)

Chelsea Scott Cooley Altman (born October 30, 1983) is an American actress, singer, model and beauty pageant titleholder who has competed in the Miss Teen USA, Miss USA and Miss Universe pageants and who has held the Miss USA 2005 title.

As Miss USA, Cooley represented the Miss Universe Organization. Her "sister" 2005 titleholders were Natalie Glebova (Miss Universe, of Canada) and Allie LaForce (Miss Teen USA, of Ohio). She raised $22.8 million for breast- and ovarian-cancer research during her time as Miss USA.

== Pageant competitions ==
=== Miss North Carolina Teen USA, Miss North Carolina USA ===
Cooley won the Miss North Carolina Teen USA 2000 title and represented North Carolina in the Miss Teen USA 2000 pageant, but did not place. Cooley first entered the Miss North Carolina USA pageant in 2004, where she placed first runner-up to Ashley Puleo. Puleo went on to place second-runner up at the Miss USA 2004 pageant. The following year, Cooley won the Miss North Carolina USA 2005 title on her second attempt.

=== Miss USA 2005 pageant ===
Cooley represented North Carolina in the Miss USA 2005 pageant broadcast live from Baltimore, Maryland on April 21, 2005. For her final question, Cooley drew the question of former Miss USA Shandi Finnessey. She was asked: "What famous person does your personality most parallel?" Her answer was: "I guess it would be Oprah. She has a passion for life. She loves what she does, and she works so hard to try to achieve everything in her life... I try to emulate myself after that."

=== Miss Universe 2005 pageant ===
Cooley competed as Miss USA in the Miss Universe pageant held in Bangkok, Thailand on May 31, 2005. Her national costume was Scarlett O'Hara from Gone with the Wind. Natalie Glebova of Canada won that pageant.

== As Miss USA ==
Within days of her pageant win in Baltimore, Cooley moved to a Trump Tower apartment in New York City that she shared with Miss Universe and Miss Teen USA. Cooley then traveled to Thailand to compete in the Miss Universe pageant, and she and newly crowned queen Natalie Glebova stayed in Thailand for a week after the competition.

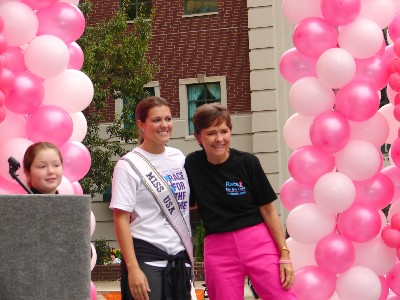
Cooley with North Carolina congresswoman Sue Myrick at the Charlotte Race for the Cure

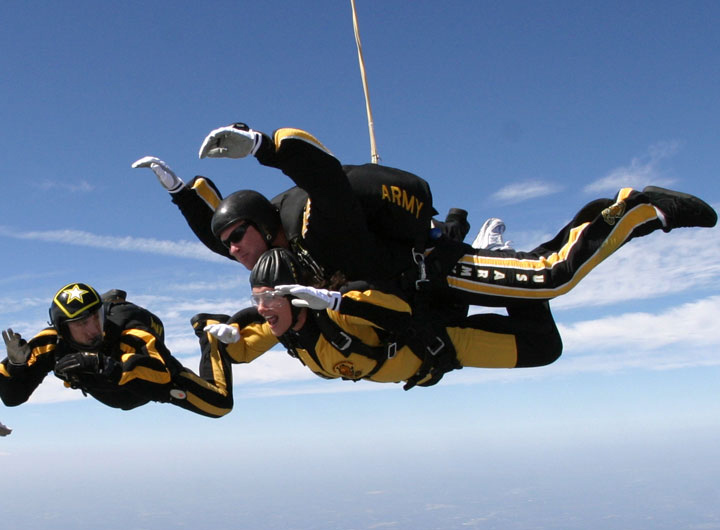
Chelsea Cooley skydives with the U.S. Army in March 2006

== Post-pageant ==
Cooley expressed a desire to move into the entertainment industry after passing on her crown.

Cooley is the president of an image consulting company, StandOut. Productions.

Awards and achievements
Preceded by Shandi Finnessey	Miss USA; 2005	Succeeded by Tara Conner
Preceded by Ashley Puleo	Miss North Carolina USA; 2005	Succeeded by Samantha Holvey
Preceded by Stephanie Holt	Miss North Carolina Teen USA; 2000	Succeeded by Erin O'Kelley
