= Candice Sanders =

American beauty pageant contestant

- Born: Candice Marie Sanders; February 21, 1977 (age 49); Brownsville, Tennessee, U.S.
- Height: 5 ft 10 in (1.78 m)
- Beauty pageant titleholder
- Title: Miss California USA 2003
- Hair color: Brown
- Eye color: Brown
- Major competition: Miss USA 2003

Candice Marie Sanders (born February 21, 1977) is a former beauty pageant contestant from Brownsville, Tennessee.

Sanders first competed in the Miss USA pageant system in 2000 when she placed first runner-up in the Miss Tennessee USA pageant. The following year she repeated that placement, placing first runner-up to Allison Alderson. In 2002, after moving to California to attend college, Sanders competed in California as Miss Greater Los Angeles USA and won the Miss California USA 2003 title in her first attempt in that state.

Sanders represented California in the Miss USA 2003 pageant broadcast live from San Antonio, Texas in March 2003, but did not place. The nationally televised event was won by Susie Castillo of Massachusetts.

On New Year's Eve, December 31, 2006, Sanders filed an action alleging domestic abuse against sportscaster Jim Lampley. She claims that she received "injuries to my head, neck and back from his throwing me against the walls and door" of her Encinitas, CA apartment, and that he had been drinking and smoking marijuana before attacking her. Lampley posted bail of $35,500. On February 22, 2007, Lampley pleaded no contest to a minor violation of a temporary restraining order and all charges of domestic violence were dissolved. San Diego County prosecutors found "insufficient evidence" to charge him. Lampley, however, issued a public apology to Sanders and her family.

At the time of her reign, Sanders was a student at Pepperdine University pursuing a double major in religion and creative writing. She was the second Pepperdine student to win the title, following Shannon Marketic who held the Miss California USA and Miss USA titles in 1992.

Preceded by Tarah Peters	Miss California USA; 2003	Succeeded by Ellen Chapman
