= Miss Teen USA 2003 =

21st edition of the Miss Teen USA competition

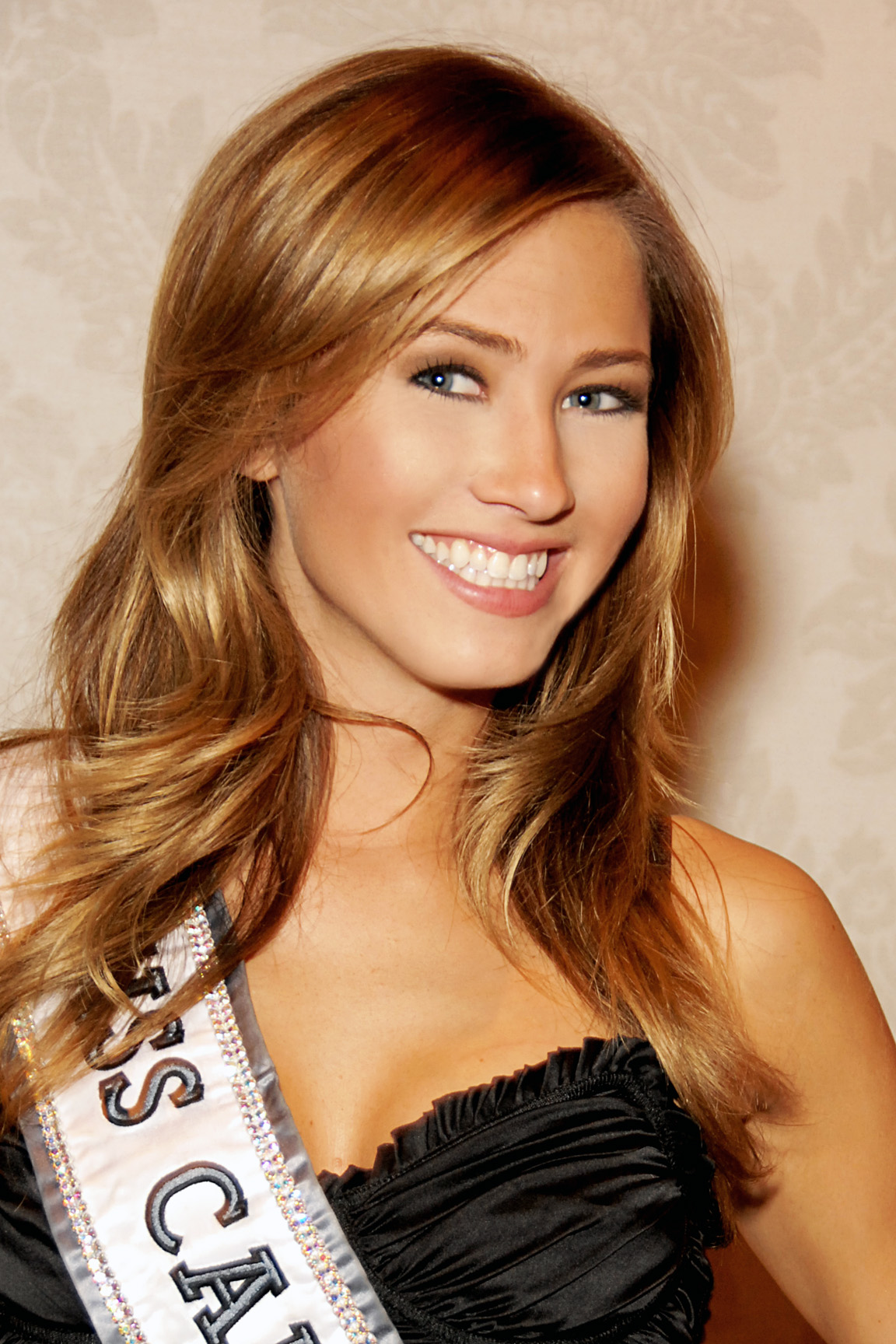
- Miss Teen USA 2003 – Tami Farrell attending the Miss California USA 2010 Pageant at the Agua Caliente Casino in Rancho Mirage, CA on Nov. 22, 2009
- Date: August 12, 2003
- Presenters: Mario Lopez; Brooke Burns
- Entertainment: Justin Guarini; Jessica Simpson
- Venue: Palm Springs Convention Center, Palm Springs, California
- Broadcaster: NBC; KMIR-TV
- Winner: Tami Farrell; Oregon
- Congeniality: Tami Farrell; Oregon
- Photogenic: Jacklyn Pezzotta; New Jersey

Miss Teen USA 2003, the 21st Miss Teen USA pageant, was televised live from Palm Springs Convention Center, Palm Springs, California on 12 August 2003. At the conclusion of the final competition, Miss Oregon Teen USA Tami Farrell was crowned by outgoing queen Vanessa Semrow of Wisconsin.

Prior to the live telecast, the 51 contestants competed in a preliminary presentation show where they were judged in swimsuits and evening gowns. Scores from this judging determined the top 15 for the final competition.

This was the first year that the pageant was held in Palm Springs, which would later host Miss Teen USA 2004 and Miss Teen USA 2006. The pageant location was announced on 17 July 2003. On 23 July 2003 it was announced that Jessica Simpson and Justin Guarini would appear as musical guests during the pageant. The event was hosted by Mario Lopez and Brooke Burns.

Farrell was the third titleholder from Oregon, the only state to win more than one Miss Teen USA title, other than Tennessee (who won in 2009) and their 1997 win.

== Results ==
=== Placements ===
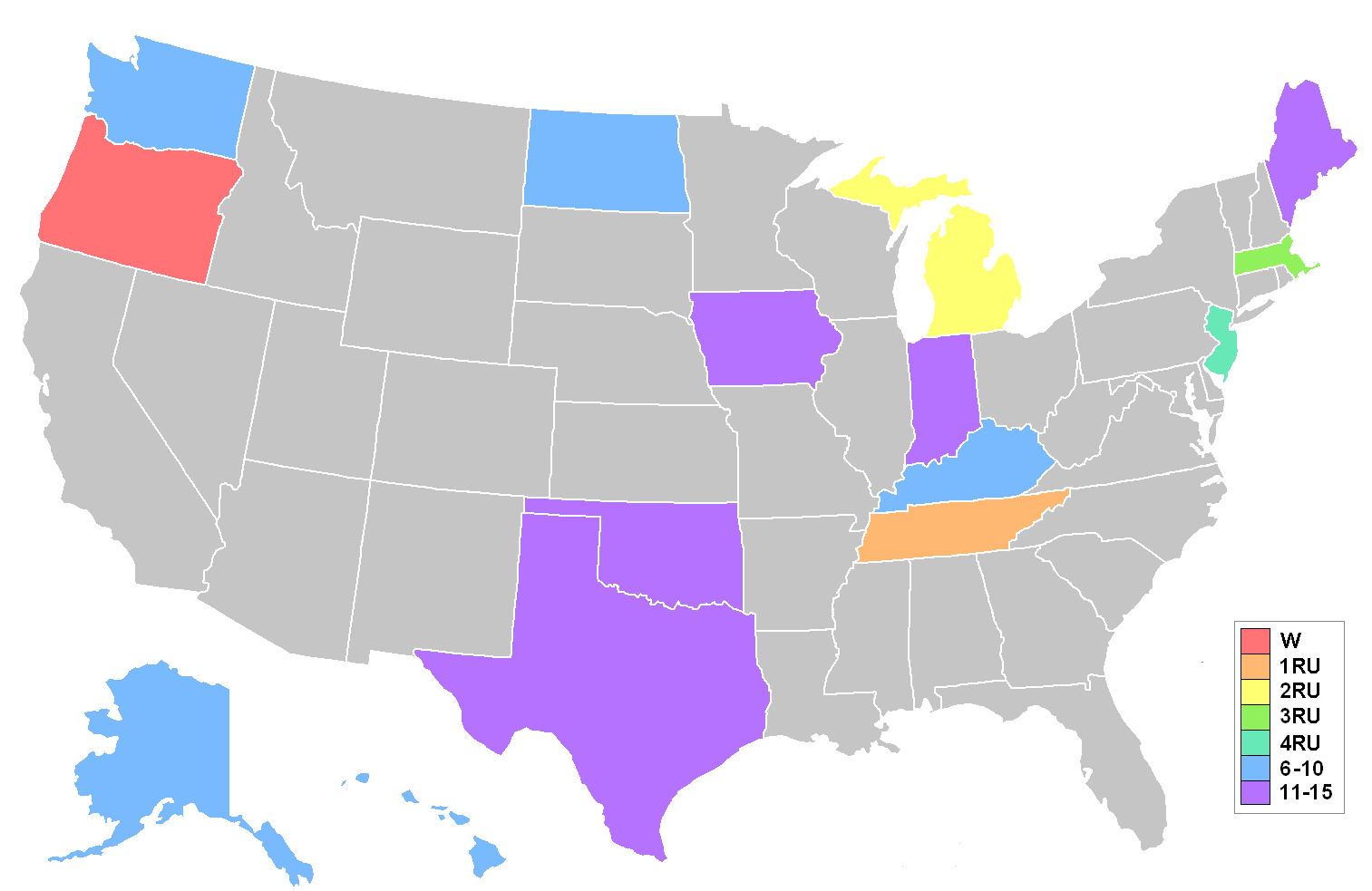
Map showing placements by state

Final results	Contestant
Miss Teen USA 2003	Oregon – Tami Farrell
1st Runner-Up	Tennessee – Alicia Selby
2nd Runner-Up	Michigan – Alicia Jaros
3rd Runner-Up	Massachusetts – Jacqueline Bruno
4th Runner-Up	New Jersey – Jacklyn Pezzotta
Top 10	Alaska – Brittany Ann Jackson; Hawaii – Camille Peraro; Kentucky – Amanda Nunneley; North Dakota – Marisa Field; (Washington (state)) Washington – Jasmine Jorgenson
Top 15	Indiana – Jami Stallings; Iowa – Alyssa Cook; Maine – Ashley Alden; Oklahoma – Nikki Carver; Texas – Tye Felan

=== Awards ===
Award	Contestant
Miss Congeniality	Oregon – Tami Farrell
Miss Photogenic	New Jersey – Jacklyn Pezzotta

== Notable features ==
- Alaska made the semi-finals for the first time since 1990 and is only the second placement in this history of the pageant.
- Maine made the semi-finals for the first time since 1995. This was only the third time that Maine made the cut.
- Iowa also placed in the semi-finals for the first time since 1995. This was also only their third placement in this history of the pageant.
- Oklahoma and North Dakota both placed for the first time since 1997.
- This was only the second time that the winner of Miss Congeniality also won the Miss Teen USA title. Previously, Vanessa Minnillo won both titles in 1998.
- This was the first time that the winners of both the Miss Congeniality and Miss Photogenic awards both placed in the top five.
- Tami Farrell also competed in the Miss California USA pageant where she was 1st runner up that was won by Carrie Prejean, last June 10, 2009. She became Miss California USA 2009 after Executive director Keith Lewis fired previous Miss California USA Carrie Prejean from the position after accusations of Carrie repeatedly breaching her contract. "...after our press conference in New York we had hoped we would be able to forge a better working relationship..." said Lewis "...it has become abundantly clear that Carrie was unwilling to fulfill her obligations under our contract and work together."
