= Miss Oregon Teen USA =

Beauty pageant competition

- Formation: 1983
- Type: Beauty pageant
- Headquarters: Puyallup
- Location: Washington
- Members: Miss Teen USA
- Official language: English
- Key people: Maureen Francisco
- Website: Official Website

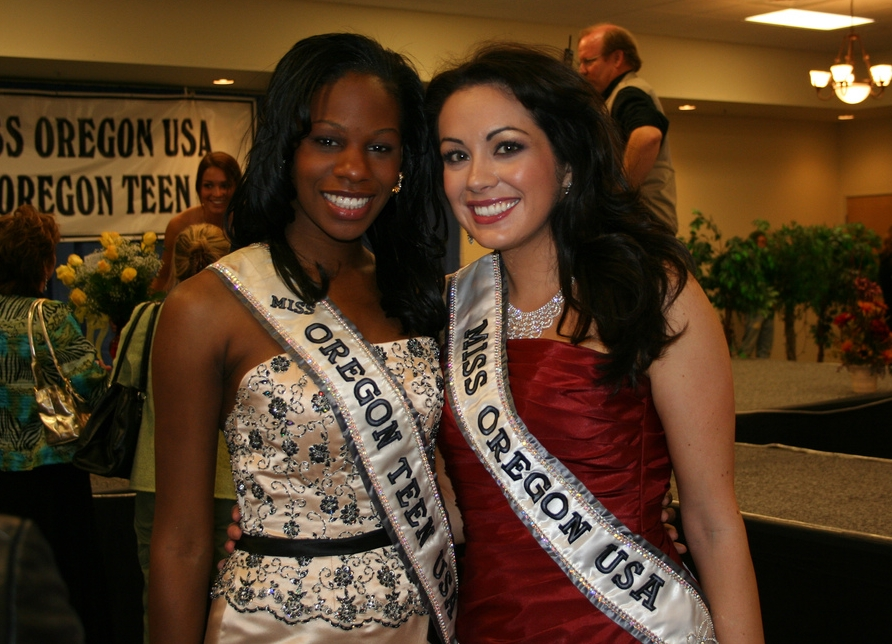
Kelci Flowers, Miss Oregon Teen USA 2006 and Allison Machado, Miss Oregon USA 2006 at the Miss Oregon USA 2007 pageant

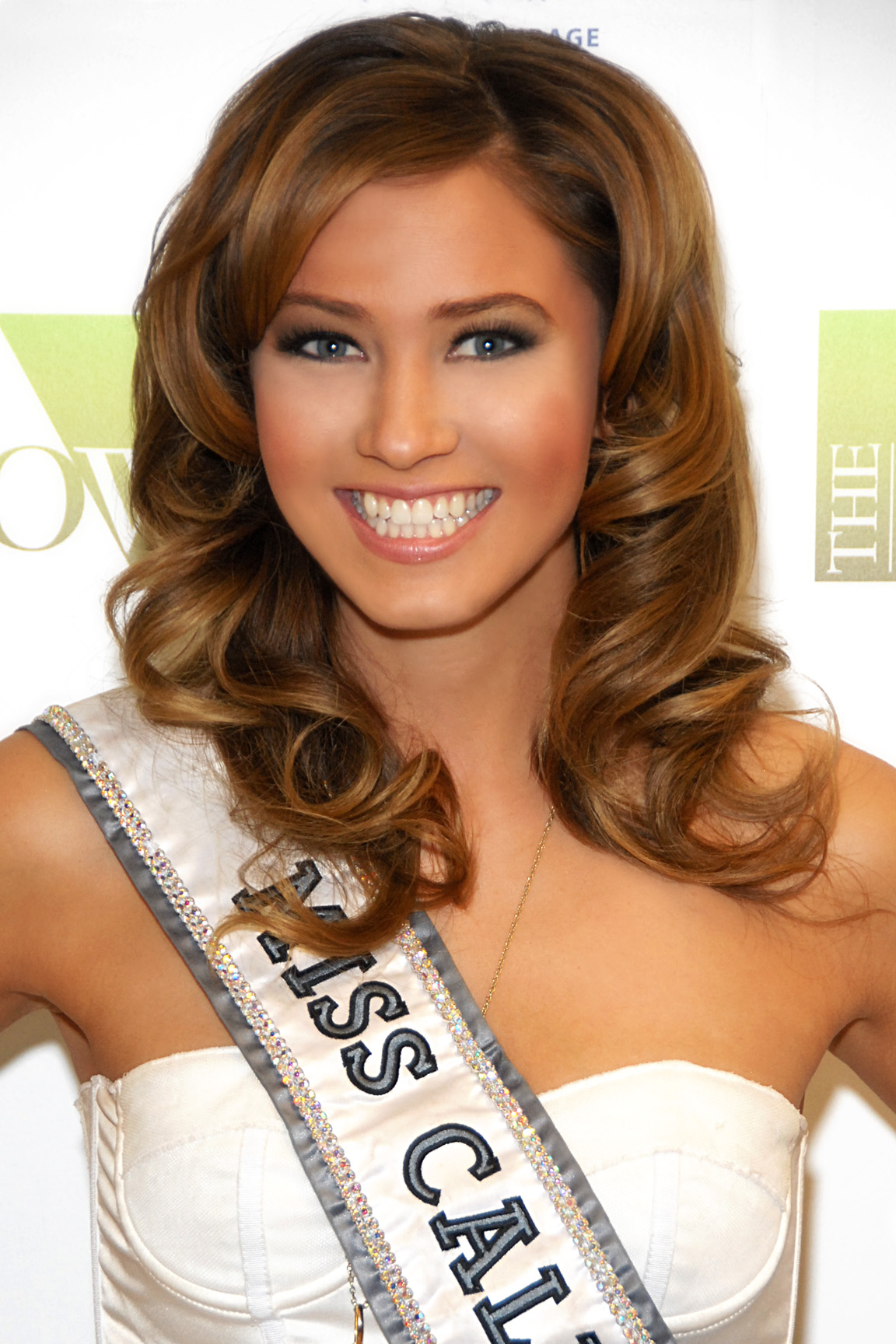
Tami Farrell - Miss Oregon Teen USA 2003 & Miss Teen USA 2003, photograph taken in 2009 when Farrell held the Miss California USA title

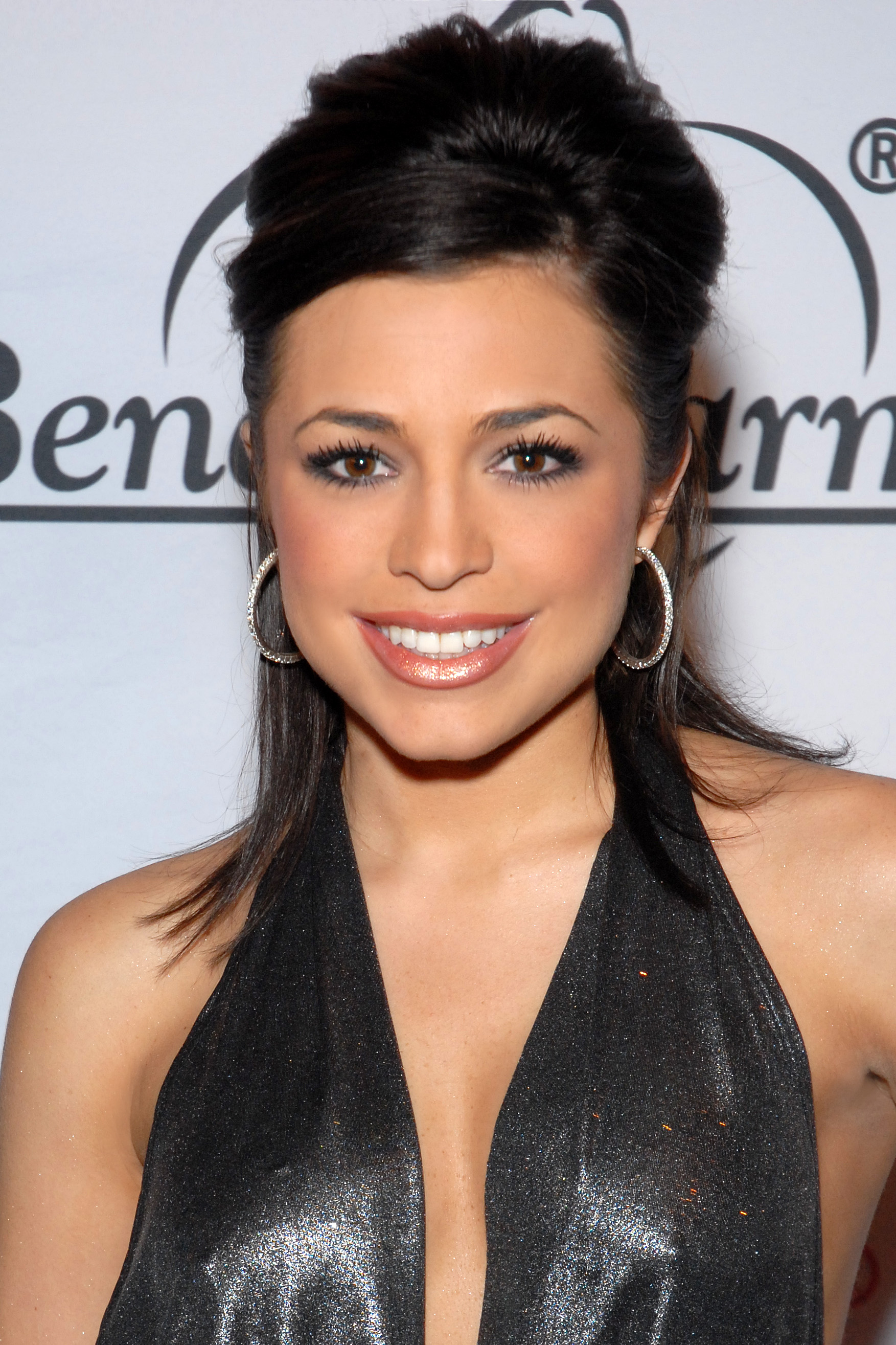
Kari Ann Peniche - Miss Oregon Teen USA 2002, photograph taken in 2008

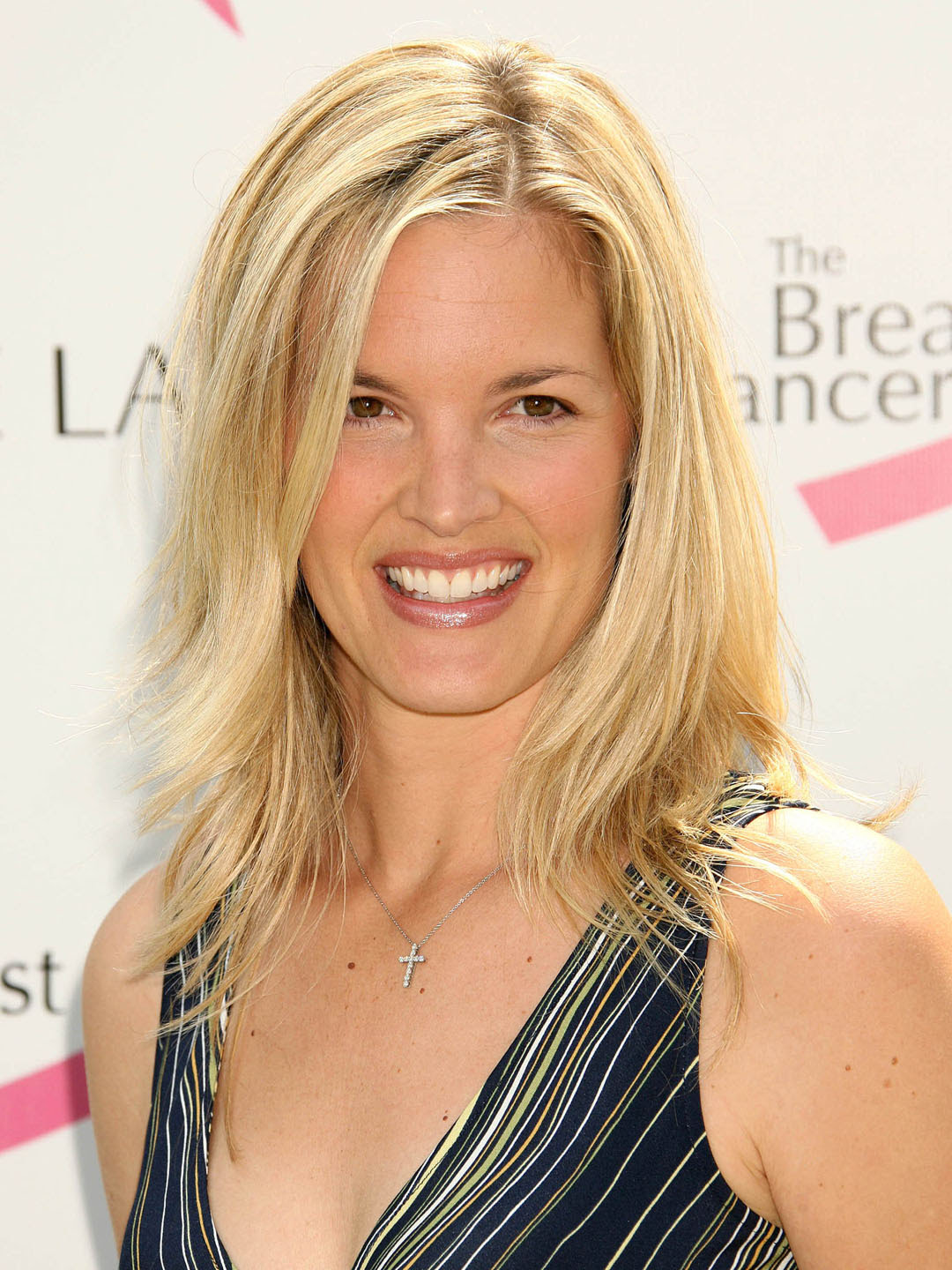
Bridgette Wilson - Miss Oregon Teen USA 1990 & Miss Teen USA 1990

The Miss Oregon Teen USA competition is the pageant that selects the representative for the state of Oregon in the Miss Teen USA pageant and the name of the title held by that winner.

The pageant is produced and directed by ABC Pageant Productions, based in Bend, Oregon, from 1989 until 2015 under Carol Jean Lukens as executive producer and state director, then in the same year saw their state director duties is handed to David Van Maren and Maureen Franchisco under directed by NW Productions, LLC. dba- Pageants NW Productions, based in Puyallup, Washington, which is continued for 9 years, their inclumbent franchise is unexpected ended on August 27, 2024 and the state director of this state is vacant.

Until Tennessee's victory in 2009, Oregon was the only state to win more than one Miss Teen USA title. Alongside Texas, they are the only two states to have produced three winners. The first two came within the years of each other, when Mindy Duncan won in 1988 becoming the 6th state that won the Miss Teen USA title for the first time and Bridgette Wilson won in 1990 who became the 8th Miss Teen USA titleholder, Wilson went on to become a successful actress and was awarded a special "Distinguished Achievement Award" in 1998. The third came over a decade later, when Tami Farrell won the crown in 2003, who became the 21st Miss Teen USA titleholder.

Oregon has received four other placements in Miss Teen USA history: 3rd runner-up in 1984, semi-finalist in 1993 and 1st runner-up in both 2017 and 2020, respectively. Oregon also won two Miss Congeniality awards, in 2001 and 2003.

Only three Miss Oregon Teen USAs have won the Miss Oregon USA title and competed at Miss USA. Tami Farrell placed first runner-up at and later assumed the Miss California USA 2009 title after the dethronement of Carrie Prejean but did not compete at Miss USA.

Heather and Jenna Jones, Miss Oregon Teen USA titleholders for 1996 and 2005 respectively, are sisters.

Reagan Strazzeri of Marina del Rey, CA was appointed Miss Oregon Teen USA on July 30th, 2026 after the open casting call from Thomas Brodeur, the new owner of the national pageant. She will represent Oregon at Miss Teen USA 2026.

== Results summary ==
=== Placements ===
- Miss Teen USAs: Mindy Duncan (1988), Bridgette Wilson (1990), Tami Farrell (2003)
- 1st runner-ups: Vanessa Matheson (2017), Shayla Montgomery (2020)
- 3rd runner-up: Dena Woodard (1984)
- Top 10: Reagan Strazzeri (2026)
- Top 12: Jill Chartier (1993)

Oregon holds a record of 8 placements at Miss Teen USA.

=== Awards ===
- Miss Congeniality: Sarah Warner (2001), Tami Farrell (2003)
- Best in Interview: Reagan Strazzeri

== Winners ==
- Declared as Winner
- Ended as runner-up
- Ended as one of the finalists or semifinalists

Year	Name	Hometown	Age^{1}	Local title	Placement at Miss Teen USA	Special awards at Miss Teen USA	Notes
2026	Reagan Strazzeri	Marina del Rey, CA	18	Miss Marina del Rey Teen	Top 10	Best in Interview	Semi-finalist, Miss Congeniality, and Miss Photogenic at Miss California Teen USA 2025
2025	Isabel Fulmer	Covina, CA	16	Miss San Gabriel Valley Teen			4th runner-up at Miss California Teen USA 2024
2024	Ashlyn Hart	Florence	17	Miss Florence Teen			
2023	Isabella Ellsworth	Happy Valley	18	Miss Happy Valley Teen			
2022	Alaina McClanen-Clemons	Portland	18				
2021	Mikaela Ochocki	Wilsonville	19				
2020	Shayla Montgomery	Happy Valley	18		1st runner-up		Later Miss Oregon USA 2024
2019	Mackenzie Peterson	Klamath Falls	17				
2018	Jaycie Forrester	Tualatin	16				
2017	Vanessa Matheson	Klamath Falls	19		1st runner-up		
2016	Mikaela Bruer	Dallas	17				
2015	Kenna Sloy	Boring	18				
2014	Alexandra Perry	Corvallis	17				
2013	Summer Piltcher	Milwaukie	18				
2012	Kiana Benion	Medford	17				
2011	Kayla Roush	Scio	18				
2010	Cara Nardini	Lake Oswego	17				
2009	Michelle Modey	Burns	18				
2008	Brittany Schwab	Milwaukie	17				
2007	Whitney Whitehouse	Redmond	17				
2006	Kelci Flowers	Portland	17				
2005	Jenna Jones	Scappoose	18				Sister of Heather Jones, Miss Oregon Teen USA 1996
2004	Lorie April Thompson	Eugene	18				
2003	Tami Farrell	Phoenix	18		Miss Teen USA 2003	Miss Congeniality	1st runner-up at Miss California USA 2009 and later assumed Miss California USA title after the dethronement of Carrie Prejean.
2002	Kari Ann Peniche	Gresham	18				Used to held as Miss United States Teen 2003 titleholder but was dethroned due to inappropriate photographs.
2001	Sarah Warner	Albany	18			Miss Congeniality	
2000	Kari Virding	Tigard	16				Later Miss Oregon 2007
1999	Tracy Hackenmiller	Bend	16				
1998	Melissa Maki	Portland	18				
1997	Stevie Ficker	Newberg	15				
1996	Heather Jones	Scappoose	18				Sister of Jenna Jones, Miss Oregon Teen USA 2005
1995	Kierra O'Brien	Hillsboro	17				
1994	Jodi Ann Paterson	Springfield	19				Playboy Playmate of the Year 2000. Married Michael Andretti in 2006.
1993	Jill Chartier	Roseburg	18		Semi-finalist		Later Miss Oregon USA 1996
1992	Maggie Molstrom	Portland	18				
1991	Delilah Anderson	Garibaldi	18				
1990	Bridgette Wilson	Gold Beach	16		Miss Teen USA 1990		Went on to become an actress in the soap Santa Barbara and in movies, like Last Action Hero. Married Pete Sampras in 2000.
1989	Catherine Dunnam	Lake Oswego	17				
1988	Mindy Duncan	Hillsboro	16		Miss Teen USA 1988		
1987	Kasey Weisiger	Jacksonville	18				
1986	Danna Christiansen	Oregon City	17				
1985	Olga Calderon	Beaverton	16				Later Miss Oregon USA 1991 and semifinalist at Miss USA 1991
1984	Dena Woodard	Eugene	17		3rd runner-up		
1983	Gretchen Thoma	Gresham	15				

^{1} Age at the time of the Miss Teen USA pageant
