= Miss USA 2009 same-sex marriage controversy =

Beauty pageant controversy

The Miss USA 2009 controversy centered on Miss California USA 2009 Carrie Prejean's answer to a question regarding same-sex marriage. On April 19, 2009, during the ceremony of Miss USA 2009 in Las Vegas, Nevada, the five finalists were all asked about political issues such as how to fight domestic violence, whether to use taxpayer money to bail out corporations, whether to give immigrants access to health care, and whether or not the United States should donate money to the government of Afghanistan to fund its elections. Kenya Moore, Miss USA 1993, has stated that the questions were "far too political and it's divisive as well".

== Background ==
At the time of the pageant same-sex marriage was legal in two US states. The California Supreme Court legalized same-sex marriage in the In re Marriage Cases ruling; voters subsequently passed Proposition 8 which made it illegal. The topic was a focus of controversy in American politics at the time of the pageant.

== The question ==
During the Q&A portion of the contest, pageant judge Perez Hilton's question came to Prejean. Hilton asked:

Vermont recently became the fourth state to legalize same-sex marriage. Do you think every state should follow suit? Why or why not?

Prejean responded:

Well I think it's great that Americans are able to choose one way or the other. We live in a land where you can choose same-sex marriage or opposite marriage. You know what, in my country, in my family, I think I believe that marriage should be between a man and a woman, no offense to anybody out there. But that's how I was raised and I believe that it should be between a man and a woman.

== Impact on the competition ==
After the pageant, Perez Hilton published derogatory comments about Prejean on his blog, and told ABC News "She lost [the crown] because of that question. She was definitely the front-runner before that," leading many to question Hilton's ethics and believe that her answer was counted heavily enough against her to make her lose the competition.

== Responses ==
=== Responses within the pageant organization ===
Hilton stated on April 20 that the pageant director, Keith Lewis, sent him a statement reading: "I am personally saddened and hurt that Miss CA USA 2009 believes marriage rights belong only to a man and a woman. Religious beliefs have no place in politics in the Miss CA family." This was denied by Lewis, who said he did not release such a statement. Lewis also said, "I support Carrie's right to express her personal beliefs even if they do not coincide with my own. I believe the subject of gay marriage deserves a great deal more conversation in order to heal the divide it has created."

Donald Trump, who owned most of the Miss Universe Organization at the time, defended Prejean's answer, saying that "Miss California has done a wonderful job" and that "It wasn't a bad answer, that was simply her belief." He then added that the question was "a bit unlucky" and that no matter which way she answered the question "she was going to get killed." He later stated: "It's the same answer that the president of the United States gave. She gave an honorable answer. She gave an answer from her heart." Miss Malibu Tami Farrell, who serves as the runner-up for Miss California, has said that "there is a lot of controversy right now. I commend her actually for taking a stance in something she believes in."

Former Miss USA Shanna Moakler defended Prejean's right to her opinion and also wrote that Miss USA is "an ambassador, a role model and needs to be able to show diplomacy on all issues". She stated that Prejean lost not because of her beliefs but because she "wasn't able to convey compassion for all the people that as Miss USA she would be representing."

=== Other responses ===
On conservative blogs and radio talk shows such as Michael Medved, Hilton was highlighted for what they viewed as an inappropriate expression of intolerance. Columnist Michelle Malkin commented that the "Celebrity leech/trash blogger" used the media to humiliate a beauty pageant contestant. She also compared Prejean's statement to a statement Barack Obama made against same-sex marriage. Malkin concluded, "The Miss USA pageant should be ashamed for providing Perez Hilton a platform for his intolerant bigotry and abuse of Carrie Prejean." Ann Coulter, wrote that "the Miss USA contest held a press conference to announce that Prejean had breast implants. Take a Christian position in public and Satan's handmaidens will turn all your secrets into front-page news." Regarding the release of "genuine 'semi-nude' photos," Coulter commented that "Liberals believe abortion is a sacrament, but smoking, wearing short skirts and modeling lingerie are mortal sins. (And if wearing women's underwear is a basis for being disqualified from the pageant, that's the end of Perez Hilton's judging career.)"

Liberal columnist Matt Littman wrote in The Huffington Post that Prejean's beliefs are the same as President Barack Obama and Secretary of State Hillary Clinton. He criticized the negative response to Prejean, stating that "Miss California will end up walking away from this with her head held high. Will the people who picked on her be able to say the same?" Gavin Newsom, mayor of San Francisco, defended Prejean's statement even though he disagrees with her position: "I want to challenge her on her point of view, but she spoke her conscience; I think she's being a little unfairly maligned".

On April 24, Fox News correspondent Bret Baier pointed out on the program, Special Report with Bret Baier, that Prejean's statements were very similar to President Barack Obama's previous statements regarding gay marriage, replaying a speech in which Obama said marriage should only be "between a man and a woman". Television personality Elisabeth Hasselbeck defended Prejean, saying that if the beauty queen was pro-gay marriage she would not be the source of relentless rumors and media coverage.

After the controversy, MSNBC commentator David Shuster remarked that, in his opinion, the type of people who participate in beauty pageants don't have anything to say worth listening to.

And on June 15, 2009, the Empowering Spirits Foundation, a national LGBT civil rights organization issued a press release asking for the LGBT community to "move forward and engage in respectful dialogue." A. Latham Staples, the foundation's executive director, was quoted as saying, "Demeaning Carrie Prejean or others by using terms such as bigot will not advance our cause of civil rights and social justice. The LGBT community must use this period of heightened attention on LGBT issues by engaging others in positive ways." Staples went on to wish Prejean "much success in her future endeavors."

== Aftermath ==
Prejean said she believes that God used Hilton's question to test her character. On The Sean Hannity Show she stated:

By having to answer that question in front of a national audience, God was testing my character and faith. I'm glad I stayed true to myself. It was not about being politically correct; for me, it was about being biblically correct. I am so proud of myself and I have so many people that are so proud of me. And [winning] wasn't what God wanted for my life that night. I was true to myself and I know that I can go out and speak to young people about standing up for what you believe in and never compromising anything for anyone or anything, even if it's the crown of Miss USA.

Hannity asked her about how she felt about Hilton's comments personally and Prejean replied: "I forgive him. I know that he's angry for whatever reason. I know there must be a bigger issue going on in his life. It just so happens that I'm used in this way. And I'm so happy; I'm so blessed. I'm happy to be here, and I'm -- I'm filled with joy. I really am."

She has stated that "I was representing California. I was representing the majority of people in California." On April 26, 2009, while speaking at Rock Church, where she is an active member, Prejean stated that Miss California USA officials had pressured her to apologize for her statement and "not talk" about her Christian faith. A spokesperson for the Miss California Pageant denied these claims.

Following the pageant, Prejean appeared in a television advertisement for the National Organization for Marriage's campaign against the legalization of same-sex marriage. The group had contacted her shortly after the ceremony. On May 1, she stated on On the Record w/ Greta Van Susteren that she did not have an opinion on civil unions for same-sex couples but that she supports rights of same-sex couples, such as hospital visitations, short of marriage. She has also stated that she would be willing to meet with representatives from California's largest gay rights group "as long as it's not political."

=== British MP Alan Duncan statement ===
On British news comedy panel show, Have I Got News For You, in Series 37: Episode 1, on the April 24, 2009, the panelists were discussing the headline "I think same sex marriages are wrong says Miss California". During the discussion, openly gay British Conservative Party MP and Shadow Leader of the House of Commons, Alan Duncan commented, "If you read that Miss California has been murdered, you will know it was me, won't you?" whilst also describing Miss California as a "silly bitch". The BBC and Ofcom received many complaints after the show. The minor Christian Party lodged a complaint with the Metropolitan Police, however no action was taken. Duncan later said, "Of course it was in jest ... It is a comedy show after all. I'm sure Miss Prejean's very beautiful and that if we were to meet we would love each other. I have no plans to kill her. I'll send her a box of chocolates - unpoisoned."
