= Tami Farrell =

American actress and beauty pageant titleholder

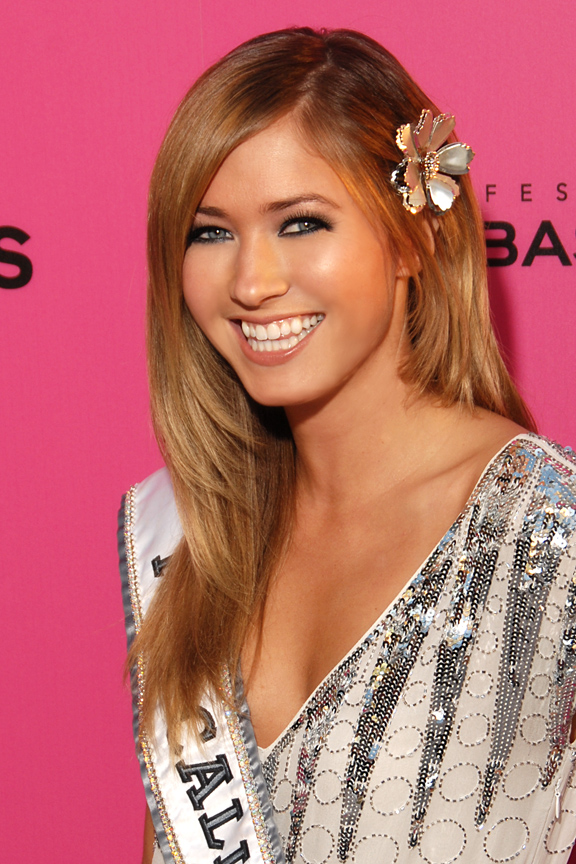
- Farrell attending "The 6th Annual Hollywood Style Awards" Beverly Hills, California in 2009
- Born: Tami Nichole Farrell; October 5, 1984 (age 42); Phoenix, Oregon, U.S.
- Beauty pageant titleholder
- Title: Miss Oregon Teen USA 2003; Miss Teen USA 2003; Miss California USA 2009
- Major competitions: Miss Teen USA 2003 (Winner)

Tami Nichole Farrell (born October 5, 1984) is an American actress, TV host and beauty queen who was crowned Miss Oregon Teen USA 2003, Miss Teen USA 2003 and Miss California USA 2009.

== Biography ==
Farrell is the daughter of a freight driver and a special education assistant. She has Vasovagal syncope.

Farrell graduated from Phoenix High School in 2003. She has supported Sparrow Clubs USA and American Heart Association since she was a student, continuing her associations throughout her reigns as Miss Teen USA and Miss California USA.

After holding the Miss Teen USA title, Farrell spent the summer of 2005 in New York City, attending the summer intensive program of the New York Conservatory for Dramatic Arts in New York City and then moved to Los Angeles, California to pursue a career in the entertainment industry.

Farrell has judged a number of state pageants, including Miss Washington USA 2006 and Miss California USA 2006.

== Miss Teen USA 2003 ==
Tami Farrell won her first title, Miss Oregon Teen USA in 2002 and went on to win the Miss Teen USA 2003 pageant in Palm Springs, California on August 12, 2003. She also won the Miss Congeniality award at the same pageant. Farrell was the third representative of Oregon to win the pageant.

As Miss Teen USA, Farrell represented the Miss Universe Organization. Her "sister" 2003 titleholders were Amelia Vega (Miss Universe, of the Dominican Republic) and Susie Castillo (Miss USA, of Massachusetts). She gave up her title to Shelley Hennig of Louisiana in Palm Springs on August 6, 2004.

== Miss California USA 2009 ==
In the summer of 2008, she won the title of Miss Malibu USA 2009 and competed at the 2009 Miss California USA Pageant where she finished as first runner up to the winner Carrie Prejean.

On June 10, 2009, she became Miss California USA 2009 after Prejean was sacked by Donald Trump. Prejean had created controversy by saying marriage should be reserved for a man and a woman during the interview portion of the Miss USA 2009 pageant.

When asked about the controversy in 2009, Farrell, who is a Christian, stated that she believes that marriage is between a man and a woman but added "I don't think that I have the right or anybody has a right to tell somebody who they can or can't love. And I think that this is a civil rights issue. And I think that the right thing to do is let the voters decide."

Awards and achievements
Preceded by Kari Ann Peniche	Miss Oregon Teen USA; 2003	Succeeded by Lorie Thompson
Preceded by (Wisconsin) Vanessa Semrow	Miss Teen USA; 2003	Succeeded by (Louisiana) Shelley Hennig
Preceded by Carrie Prejean	Miss California USA; 2009 (assumed)	Succeeded by Nicole Johnson
