= Miss USA 1992 =

41st Miss USA pageant

- Date: February 7, 1992
- Presenters: Dick Clark; Terry Murphy; Deborah Shelton
- Venue: Century II Convention Center, Wichita, Kansas
- Broadcaster: CBS, KWCH-TV
- Entrants: 51
- Placements: 11
- Winner: Shannon Marketic; California
- Congeniality: Alesia Prentiss (Nevada)
- Photogenic: Shannon Marketic (California)

Miss USA 1992 was the 41st Miss USA pageant, televised live from the Century II Convention Center in Wichita, Kansas on February 7, 1992.

At the conclusion of the final competition, Shannon Marketic of California was crowned by outgoing titleholder Kelli McCarty of Kansas. Marketic became the fifth Miss USA titleholder from California and also the second Miss California USA to win both the Photogenic award and Miss USA crown, making her state the first one to repeat this feat. She was also the 4th Miss Photogenic to be crowned as Miss USA after winning the award.

The pageant was hosted by Dick Clark, with color commentary by Terry Murphy and Deborah Shelton, Miss USA 1970.

This was the third of four years that the pageant was held in Wichita.

== Results ==
=== Placements ===
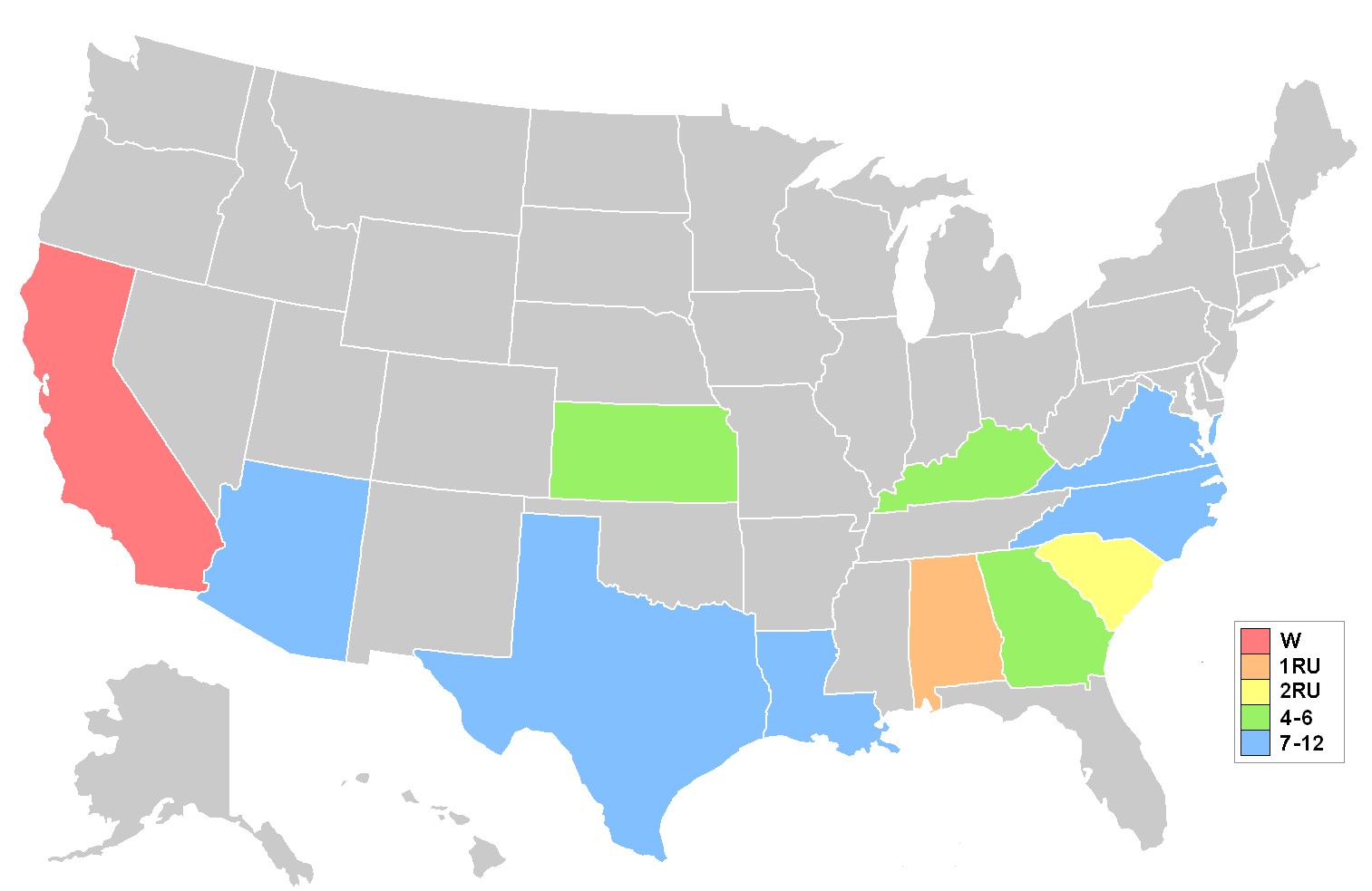
Map showing placements by state

Final results	Contestant
Miss USA 1992	California – Shannon Marketic
1st Runner-Up	Alabama – Candace Brown
2nd Runner-Up	South Carolina – Audra Wallace
Top 6	Kentucky – Angela Carole Hines; Kansas – Kimberlee Girrens; (Georgia (U.S. state)) Georgia – Jennifer Nell Prodgers
Top 11	Arizona – Dannis Tracey Shepherd; Texas – Katie Nicole Young; Virginia – Brandi Bottorff; North Carolina – Tess Elliott; Louisiana – Christy Lynn Saylor

=== Special awards ===
- Miss Congeniality: Alesia Prentiss (Nevada)
- Miss Photogenic: Shannon Marketic (California)
- Best State Costume: Heather Christine Gray (Indiana)
- Best in Swimsuit: Candace Brown (Alabama)

== Delegates ==
The Miss USA 1992 delegates were:

- Alabama – Candace Brown
- Alaska – Kelly Quirk
- Arizona – Dannis Tracey Shepherd
- Arkansas – Jona Garner
- California - Shannon Marketic
- Colorado – Laura Dewild
- Connecticut – Catherine Sanchez
- Delaware – Julie Ann Griffith
- (Washington, D.C.) District of Columbia – Wanda Jones
- Florida – Sharon Belden
- (Georgia (U.S. state)) Georgia – Jennifer Nell Prodgers
- Hawaii – Heather Elizabeth Hays
- Idaho – Cheryl Lin Myers
- Illinois – Leilani Magnussen
- Indiana – Heather Christine Gray
- Iowa – Pam Patrick
- Kansas – Kimberlee Girrens
- Kentucky – Angela Carole Hines
- Louisiana – Christy Lynn Saylor
- Maine – Linda Kiene
- Maryland – Renee Rebstock
- Massachusetts – Christine Netishen
- Michigan – Lainie Lu Howard
- Minnesota – Amber Rue
- Mississippi – Tammy Johnson
- Missouri – Tonya Snodgrass
- Montana – Joy Estrada
- Nebraska – Jeanna Margaret Blom
- Nevada – Alesia Prentiss
- New Hampshire – Rebecca Lee Lake
- New Jersey – Kathy Kasprak
- New Mexico – Charlotte Holland
- (New York (state)) New York – Christine Elizabeth Beachak
- North Carolina – Tess Elliott
- North Dakota – Camie Lynn Fladeland
- Ohio – Courtney Lea Baber
- Oklahoma – Maya Walker
- Oregon – Terrie House
- Pennsylvania – Catherine Weber
- Rhode Island – Yvette Hernandez
- South Carolina – Audra Wallace
- South Dakota – Shawn Christine Frerichs
- Tennessee – Natalie Ann Bray
- Texas – Katie Nicole Young
- Utah – Nichelle Mickelson
- Vermont – Bonnie Kittredge
- Virginia – Brandi Bottorff
- (Washington (state)) Washington – Stinha McLynne
- West Virginia – Vickie Myers
- Wisconsin – Kelly Bright
- Wyoming – Lisa Postle

== Contestant notes ==
- Three contestants had previously competed in the Miss Teen USA pageant.
  - Kimberlee Girrens (Kansas) - Miss Kansas Teen USA 1986
  - Linda Kiene (Maine) - Miss Maine Teen USA 1986
  - Renee Rebstock (Maryland) - Miss Maryland Teen USA 1987
- Sharon Belden (Florida) later competed as Miss United States in Miss World 1992 and placed as semi-finalist.
- Maya Walker (Oklahoma) had previously competed at Miss America 1989 as Miss Colorado, where she placed first runner-up.
- Tess Elliott (North Carolina) was killed seven months later in a freak sky-diving accident.
- Vickie Myers (West Virginia) was from 2005 to 2006 arrested three times in eighteen months for drunk driving and was found dead in her home in January 2007. No foul play was suspected in her death.
- Audra Wallace (South Carolina) later was Miss South Carolina World 1993 and competed in Miss World America 1993 and finished as 3rd Runner-Up.
