= Nicole Johnson (Miss California USA) =

American beauty queen (born 1985)

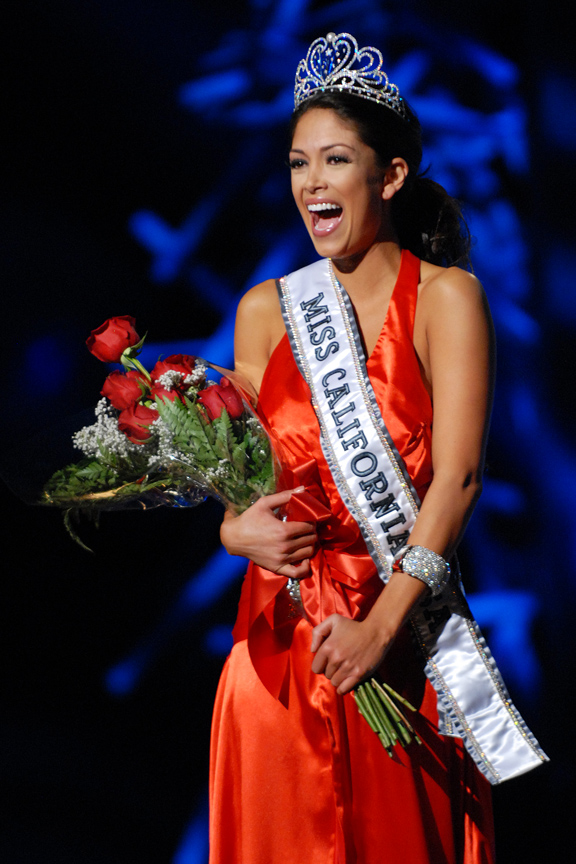
- Johnson at the Miss California USA pageant, November 22, 2009
- Born: Nicole Michele Johnson; July 12, 1985 (age 41); Colorado Springs, Colorado, U.S.
- Spouse: Michael Phelps (m. 2016)
- Children: 4
- Parents: Richard Johnson (father); Annette Johnson (mother)
- Beauty pageant titleholder
- Title: Miss California USA 2010
- Hair color: Brown
- Eye color: Brown
- Major competitions: Miss California USA 2010 (Winner); Miss USA 2010 (Top 10)

Nicole Michele Johnson Phelps (born July 12, 1985) is an American beauty queen who was Miss California USA 2010 and competed in the Miss USA pageant.

== Early life and education ==
Johnson, the daughter of Annette, a science teacher, and Richard, a pharmaceutical sales manager, was born in Colorado Springs, Colorado, spent her early childhood in Pennsylvania, and moved to Westlake Village, California, prior to starting middle school. She graduated from Westlake High School in 2003.

In 2007, Johnson graduated with honors from the University of Southern California with a Bachelor of Arts in Communication, concentrating in sports and entertainment.

== Career ==
When Johnson was 17, she read an advertisement in the Thousand Oaks Acorn for Miss California Teenager. Johnson, a student at Moorpark College, wanted to transfer to the University of Southern California and thought the scholarship would help pay her education. Out of 304 contestants Johnson took first runner-up.

After previously being first runner-up in the 2007 pageant, Johnson won the Miss California USA 2010 title in November 2009. She went on to compete in the Miss USA 2010 pageant held in Las Vegas where she placed ninth. She had been considered a favorite to win the title.

== Personal life ==
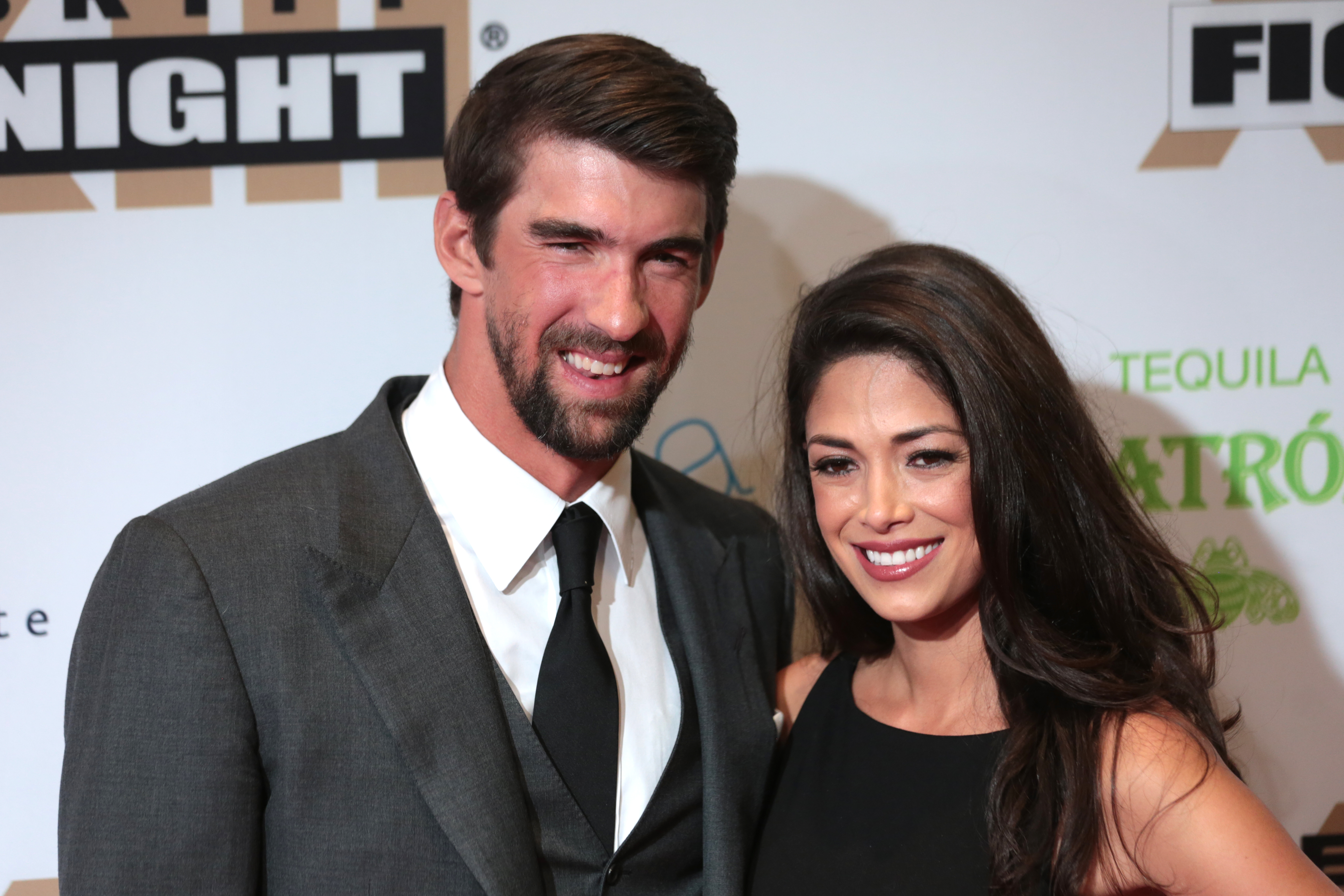
Johnson with husband Michael Phelps in March 2017.

On February 21, 2015, Johnson became engaged to swimmer Michael Phelps. Johnson and Phelps had first met at the 2007 ESPY Awards. They started dating in 2009 and temporarily broke up prior to the 2012 Summer Olympics before reuniting in 2014. On June 13, 2016, the couple wed in a private ceremony. The couple have four sons.

Honorary titles
| Preceded by Tami Farrell | Miss California USA; 2010 | Succeeded by Alyssa Campanella |
