= Miss California USA =

Beauty pageant competition

- Formation: 1952
- Type: Beauty pageant
- Headquarters: Santa Monica
- Location: California
- Members: Miss USA
- Official language: English
- Key people: Kristen Bradford
- Website: Official website

Miss California USA is the beauty pageant that selects the representative for the state of California in the Miss USA pageant, and the name of the title held by that winner. The pageant is directed by Crown Diva Productions.

California's most successful placements were in 1959, 1966, 1975, 1983, 1992, and 2011, when Terry Huntingdon, Maria Remenyi, Summer Bartholomew, Julie Hayek, Shannon Marketic, and Alyssa Campanella, respectively, were crowned Miss USA.

The current Miss California USA is Acacia McBride of Calabasas, who was crowned on July 12, 2026, at The Grand Hyatt Indian Wells in Indian Wells. McBride will represent California at Miss USA 2026.

== History ==
The Miss California USA Pageant was produced by Carolee Munger. Prior to Ms. Munger, Guyrex Productions held the franchise for a number of years and produced successful televised pageants with over 100 participants. Before Guyrex, the pageant was produced by Dr. Leanord Stallcup, who took over the directorship after Faye Smith successfully led the way through the 1970s and 1980s. Also was produced by Top 10 Productions, Inc. based in San Diego. Top 10 was led by Pam Wilson and Alex Kuty, who have been involved in pageant and fashion production for many years. Top 10 took over for K2 Productions in 2013. K2 had a number of controversies but during its 9 years producing the pageant, it managed to be the top placing state at Miss USA, growing the entry numbers to the largest state pageant in the history of Miss USA and doing the first live television airing in over 10 years. In the beginning, K2 Productions was directed by former Miss Teen USA 1995, Keylee Sue Sanders and Keith Lewis. K2 Productions was later directed by Lewis and briefly co-produced by Miss USA 1995, Shanna Moakler. From 2018 until 2021, Chrisley Productions held the franchise alongside Miss Florida USA under directed by the Chrisley family. In October 2021, Kristen Bradford of Crown Diva Productions took over the directorship for California pageants.

In 2009, Carrie Prejean was forced to resign after placing 1st runner-up at Miss USA 2009 after a controversy developed regarding the answer she gave to her final interview question at the national pageant. Pageant organizers claimed she was fired due to contractual violations.

California has produced a Miss USA every decade (except the 2000s) and is ranked second highest among states in terms of placements, after Texas.

Shauna Gambill, who won the Miss Teen USA crown in 1994, is the only Miss California USA who has previously held the Miss California Teen USA title. As Miss California USA in 1998, Gambill placed 1st Runner-Up to Shawnae Jebbia of Massachusetts. Three Miss California USA titleholders have also competed in the Miss America pageant while two were former winners of the Miss Teenage California Scholarship Pageant.

== Gallery of titleholders ==
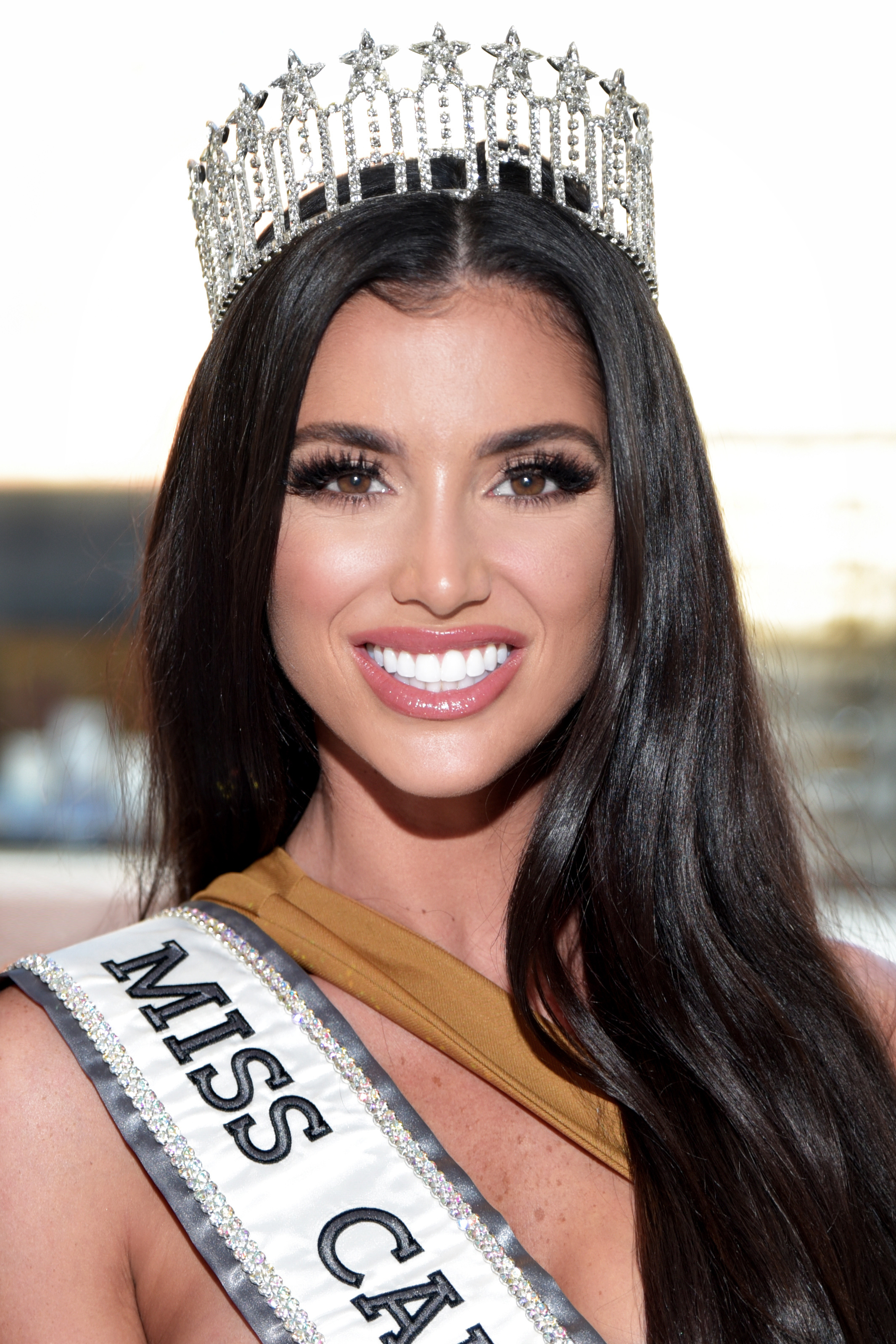
Erica Dann, Miss California USA 2019

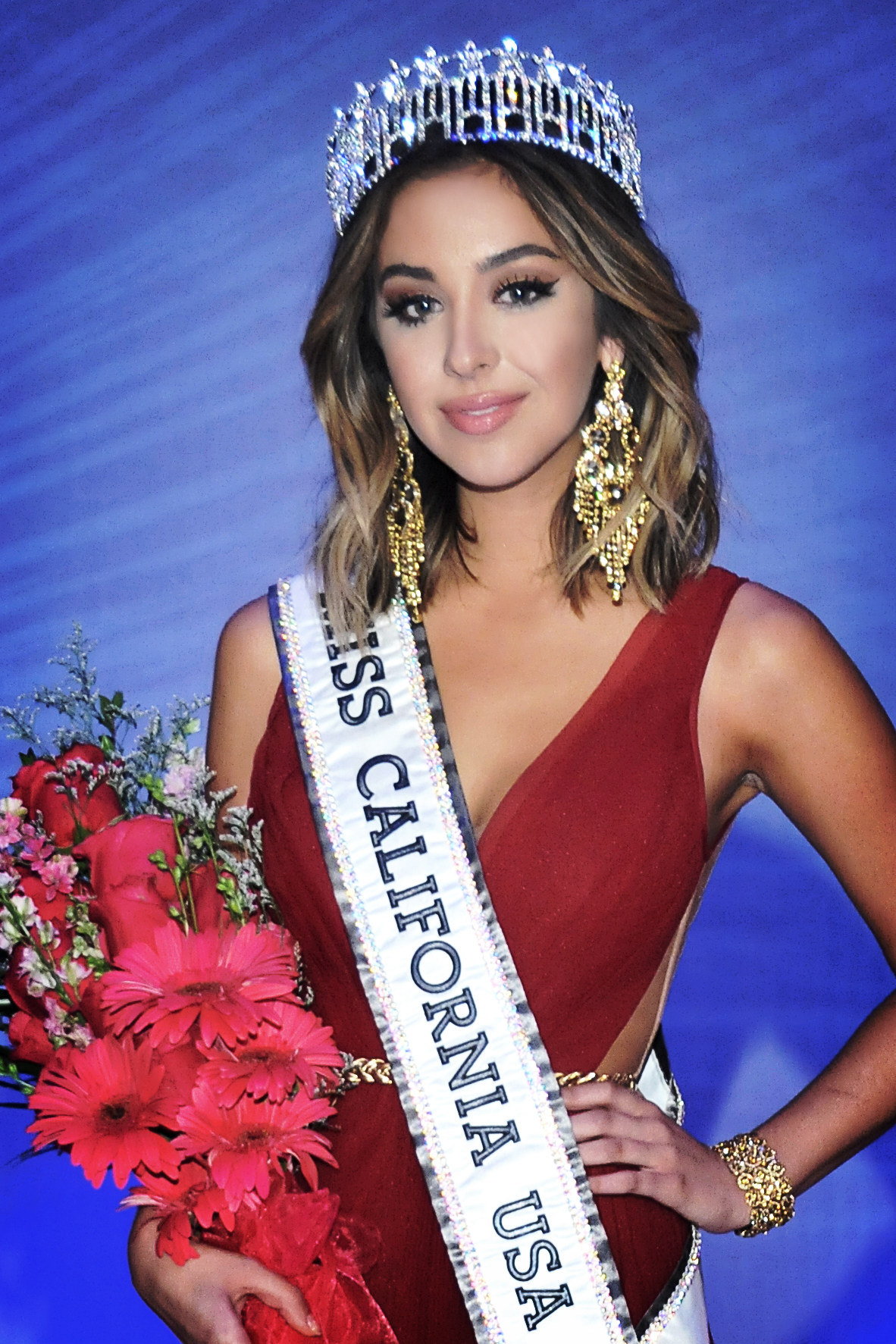
Nadia Mejia, Miss California USA 2016

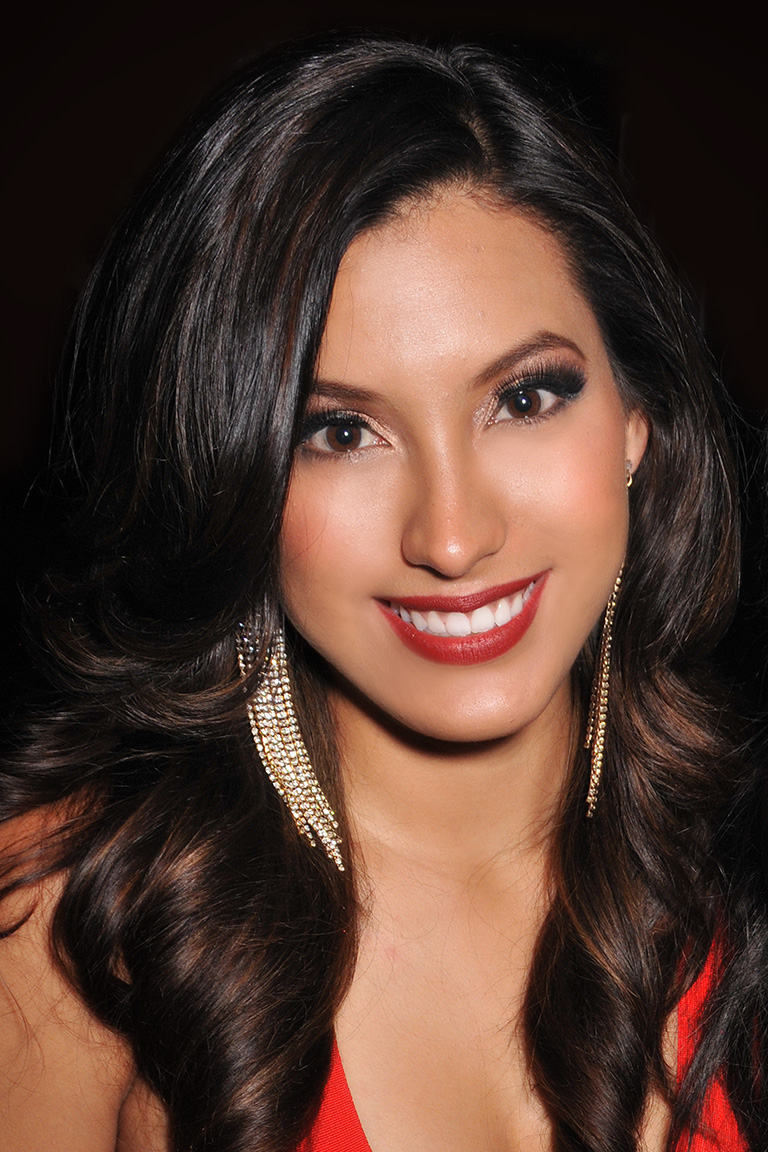
Natasha Martinez, Miss California USA 2015

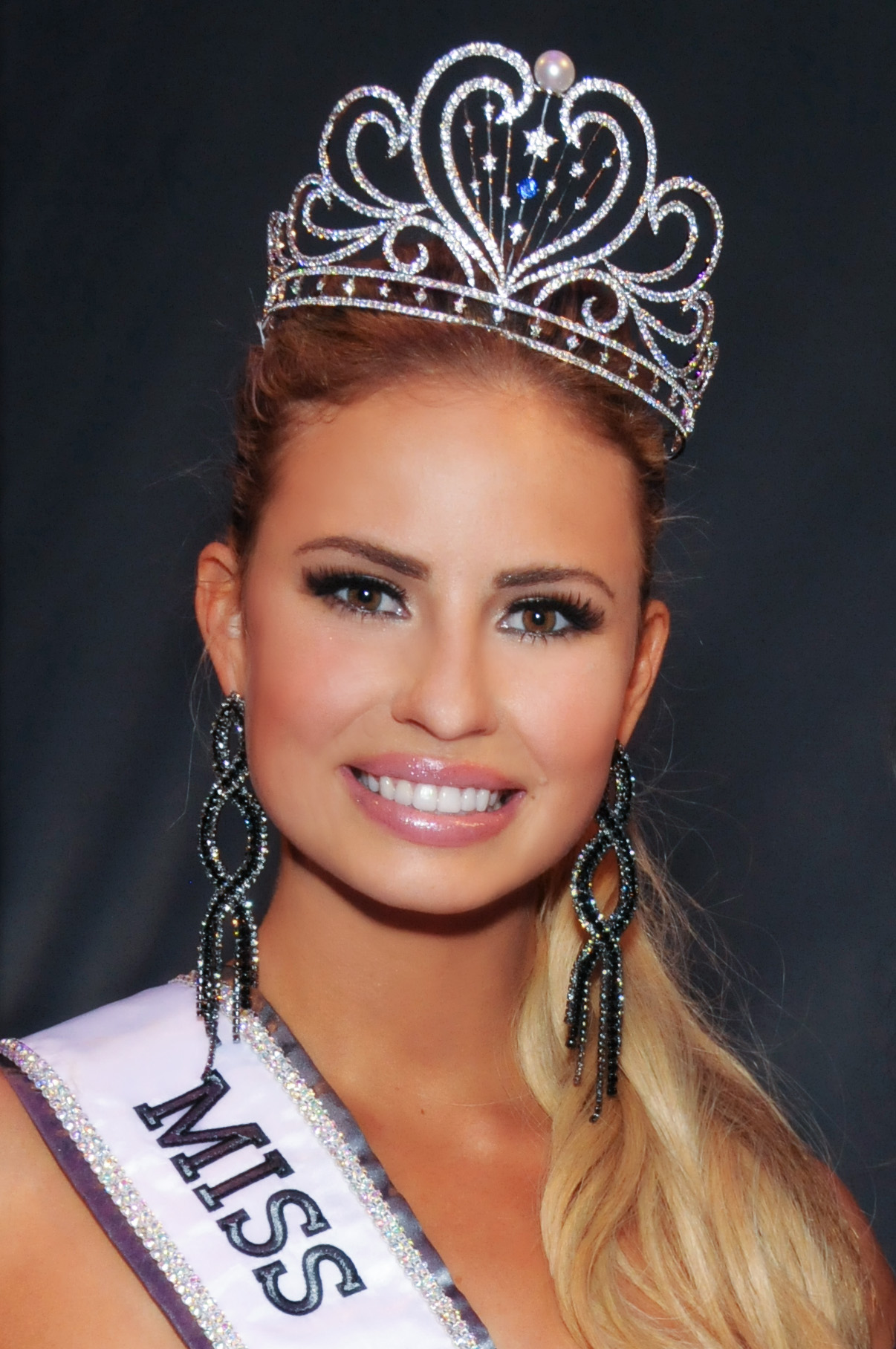
Cassandra Kunze, Miss California USA 2014

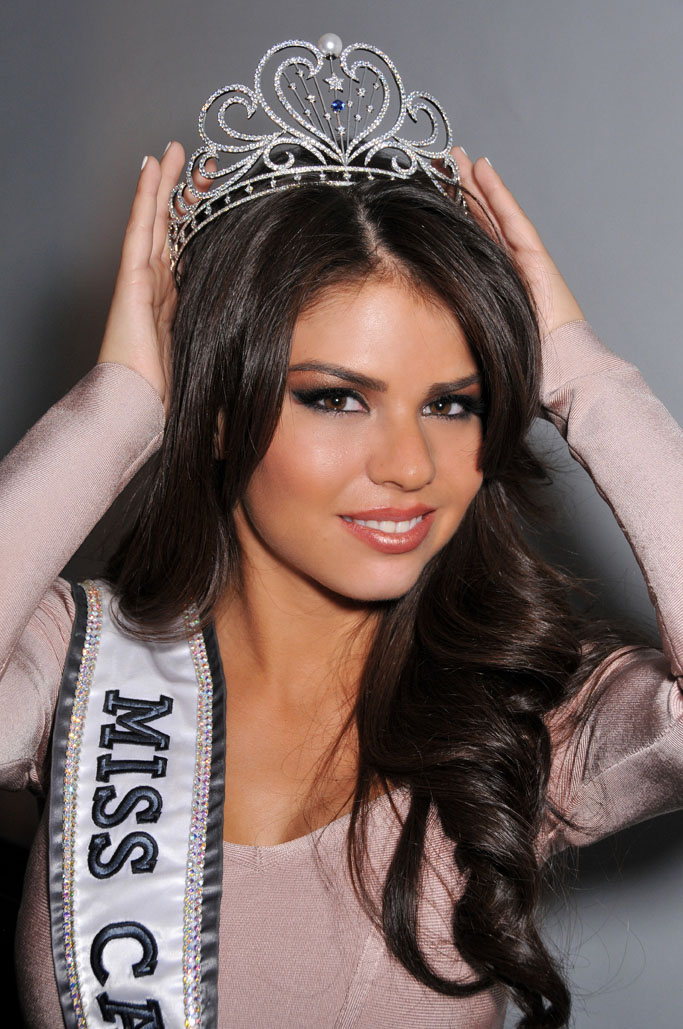
Mabelynn Capeluj, Miss California USA 2013

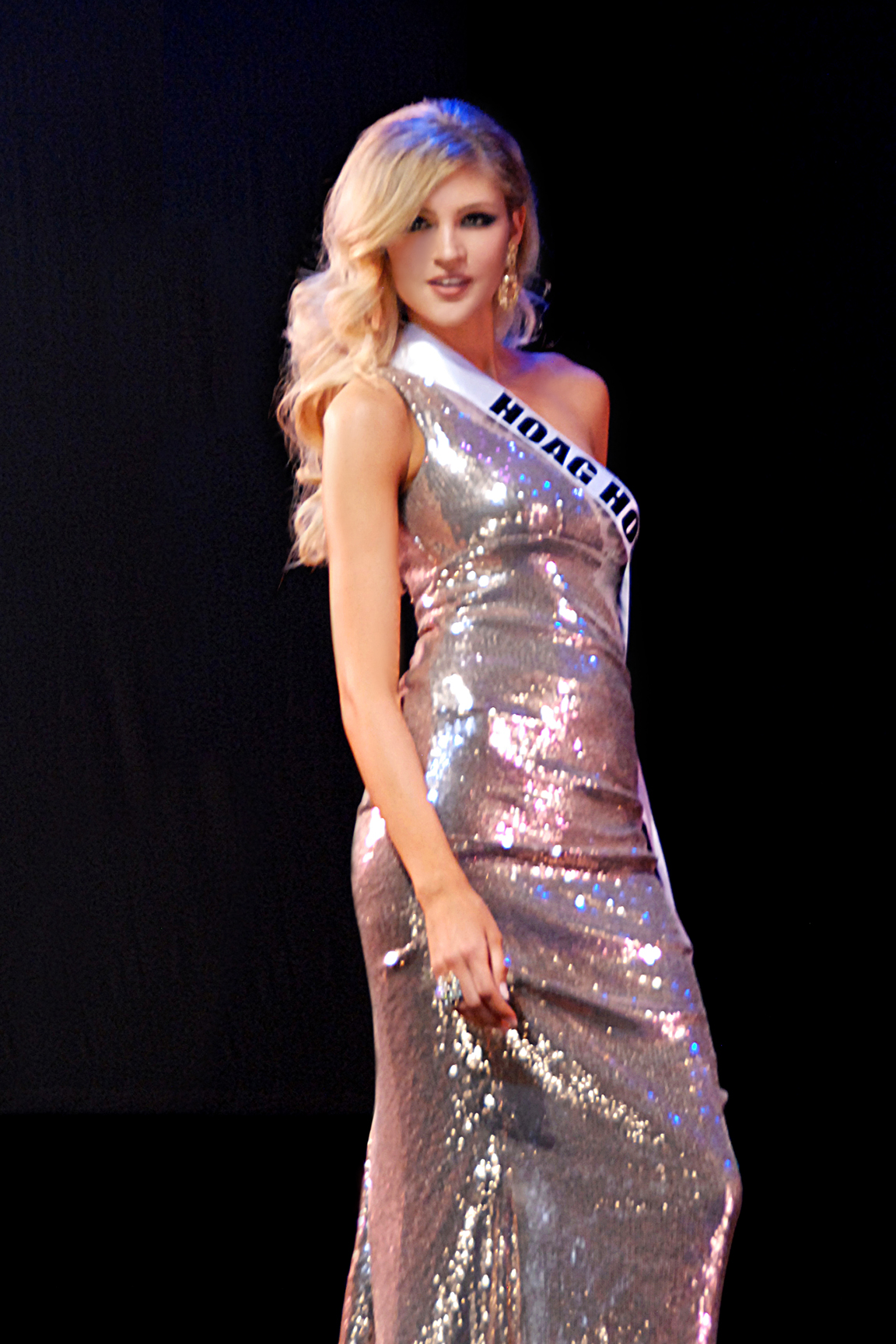
Natalie Pack, Miss California USA 2012

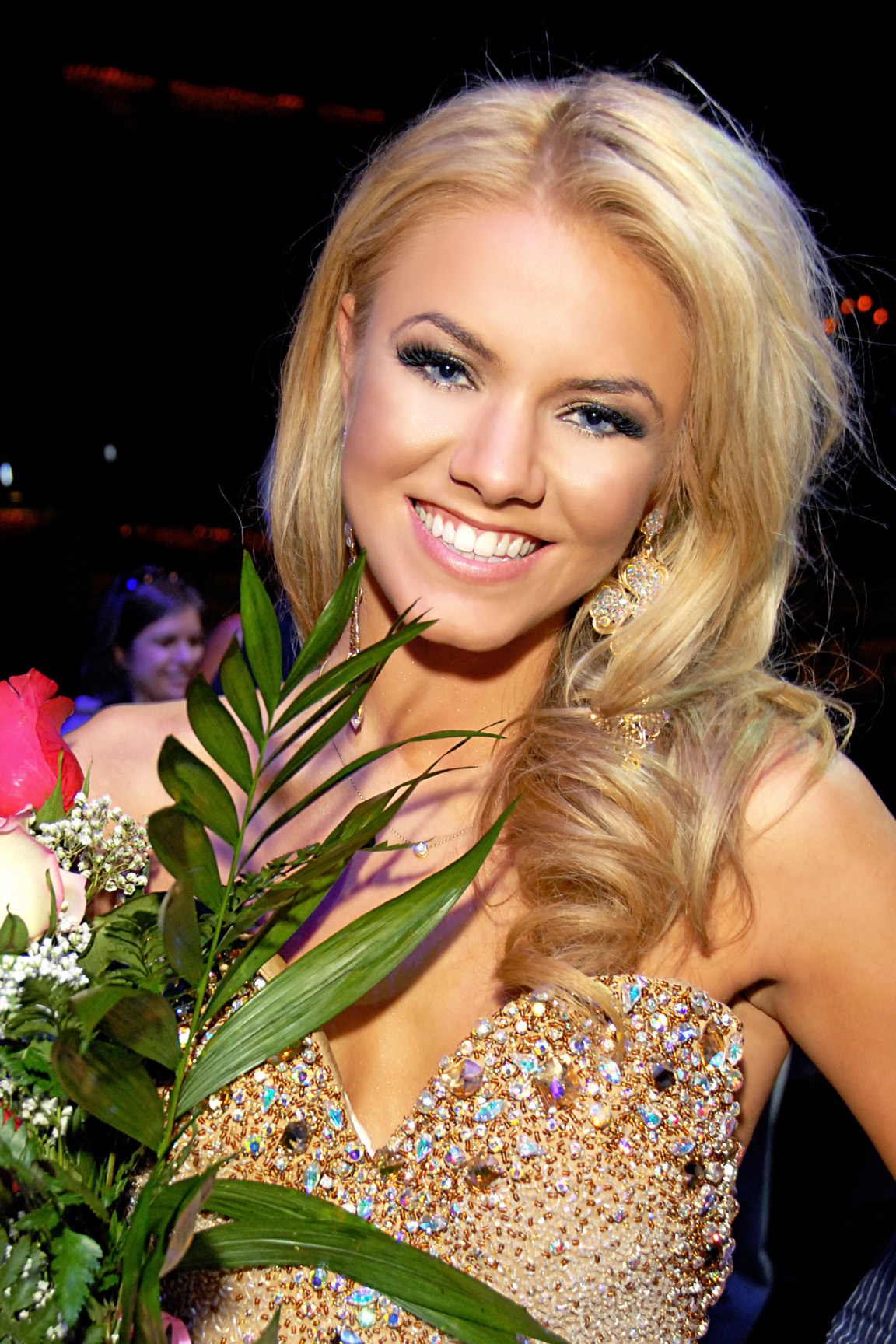
Katie Blair, Miss California USA 2011 (Note: Blair was originally the first runner-up, but inherited the title of Miss California USA 2011 when Alyssa Campanella was crowned Miss USA 2011. The two titles cannot be held simultaneously.)

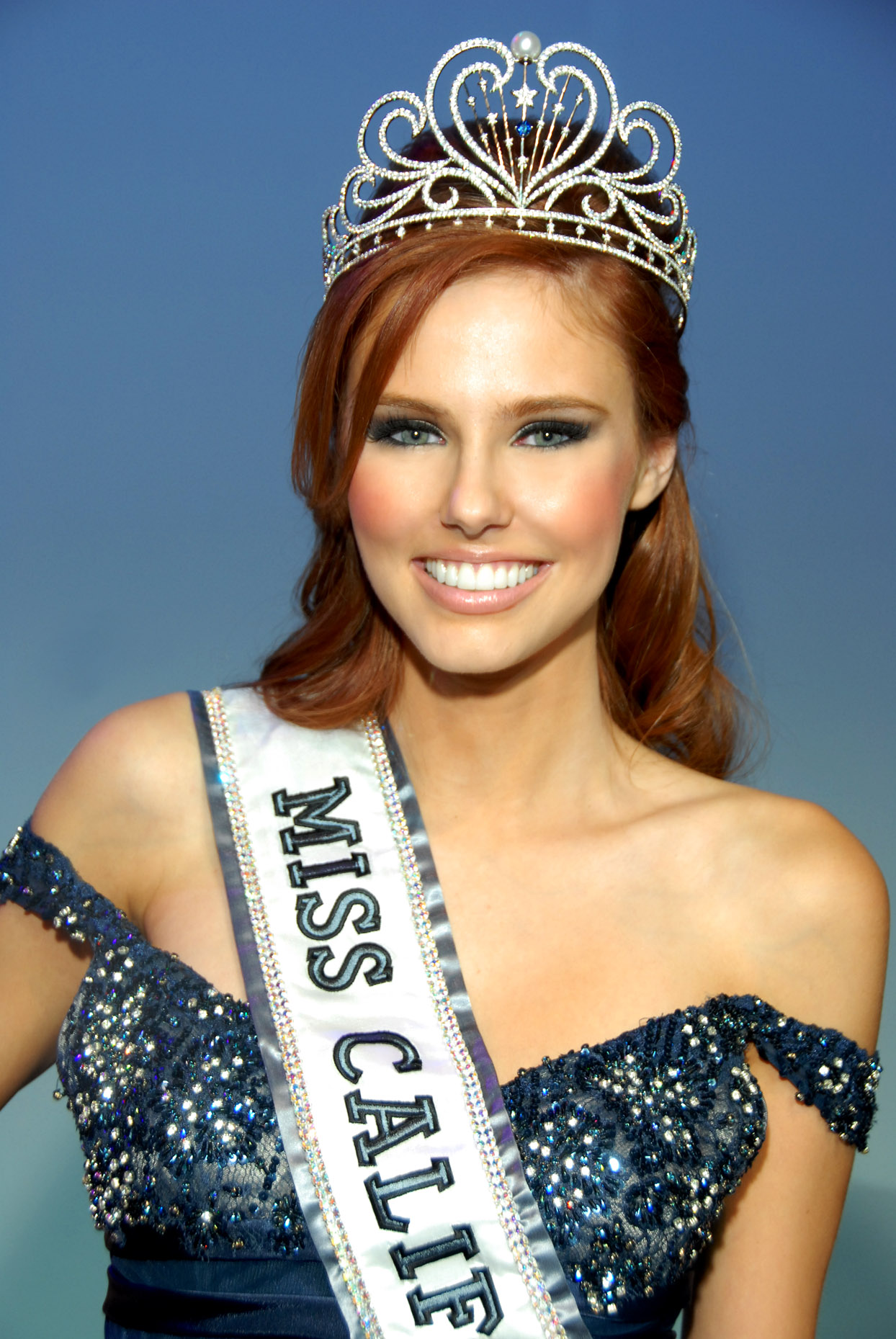
Alyssa Campanella, Miss California USA 2011 and Miss USA 2011

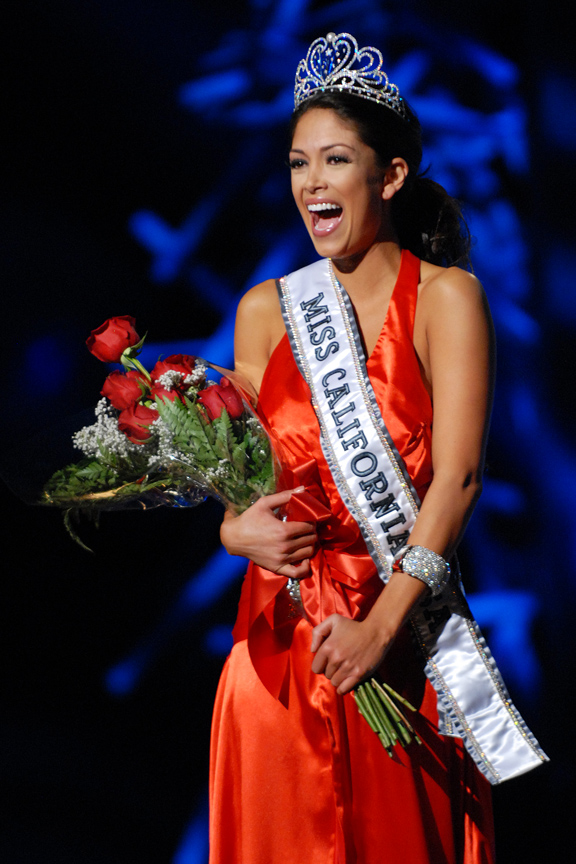
Nicole Johnson, Miss California USA 2010

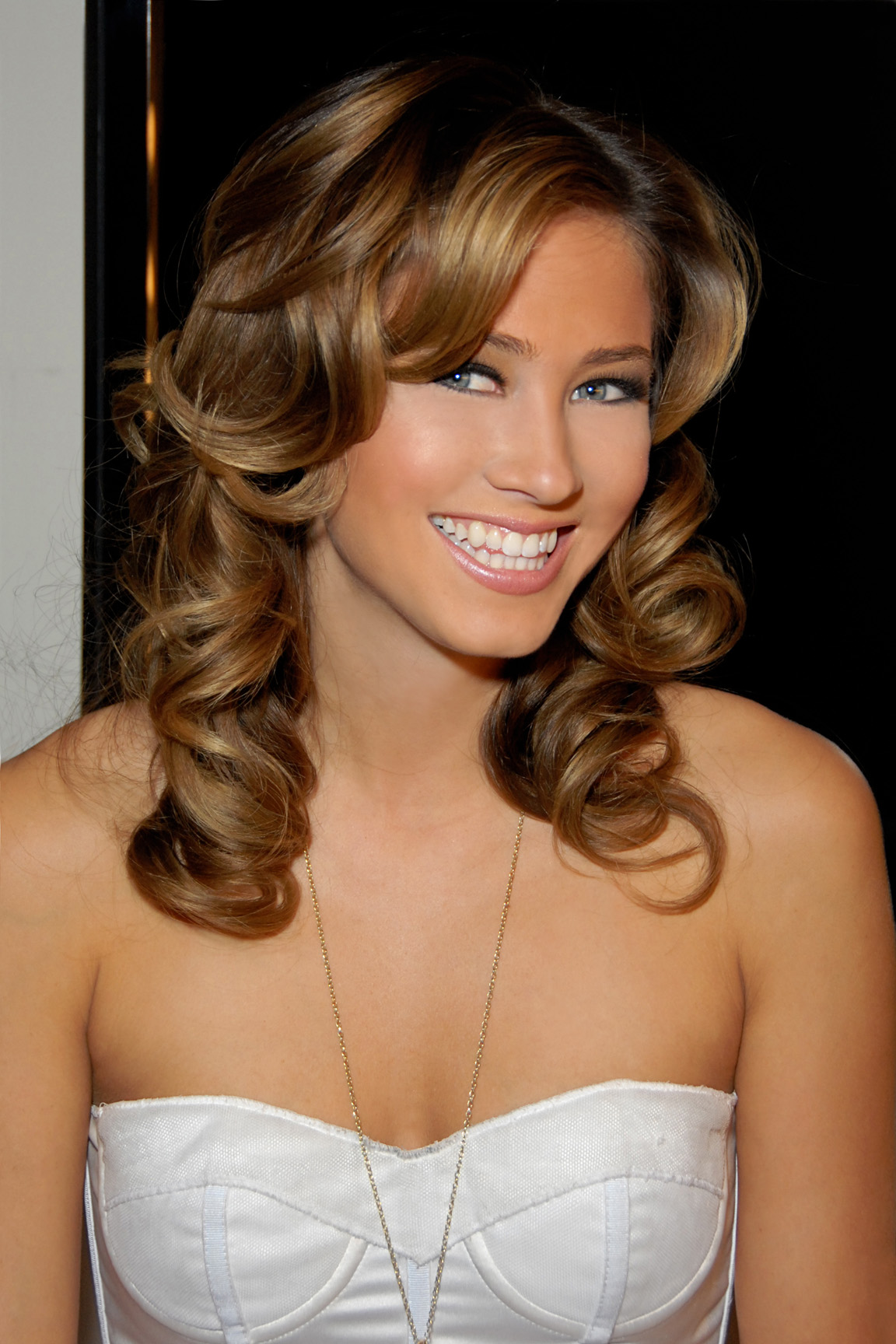
Tami Farrell, Miss California USA 2009 (Note: Farrell was originally the first runner-up, but inherited the title of Miss California USA 2009 when Carrie Prejean was dethroned during her reign.)

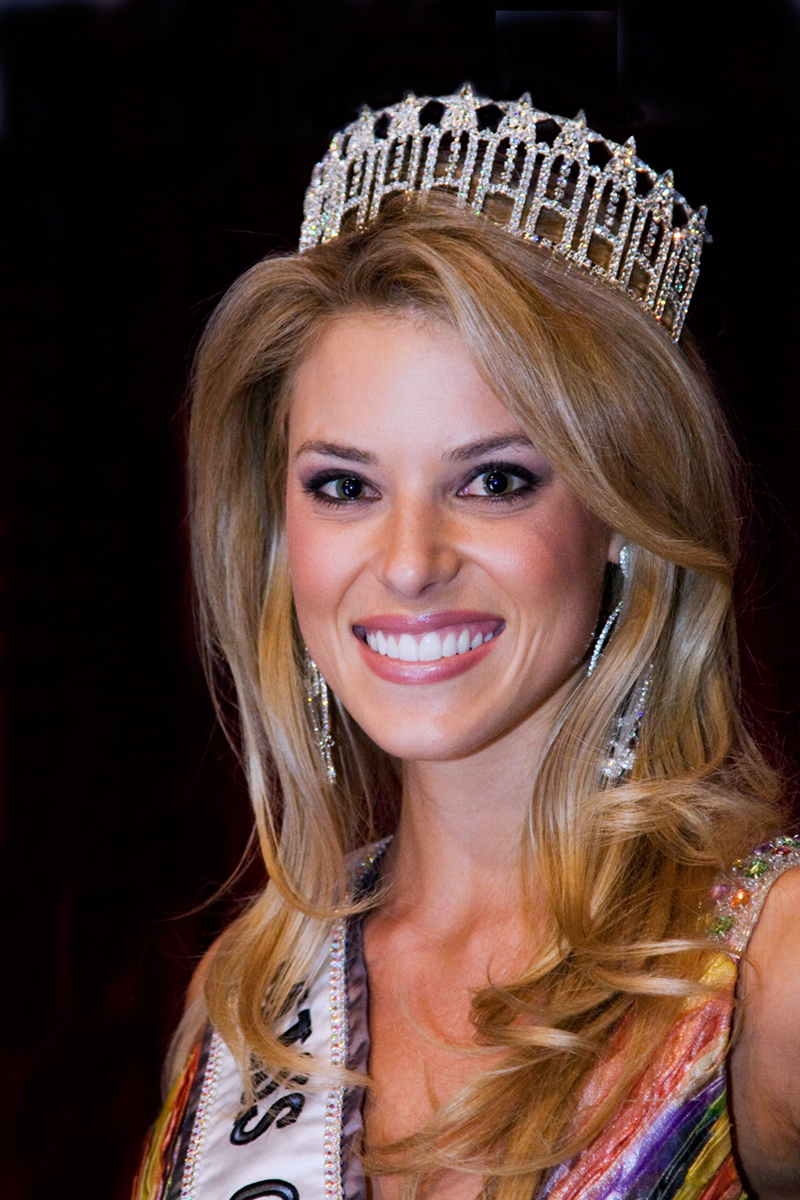
Carrie Prejean, Miss California USA 2009 (Note: Prejean was dethroned by the Miss California USA Organization and did not complete her reign.)

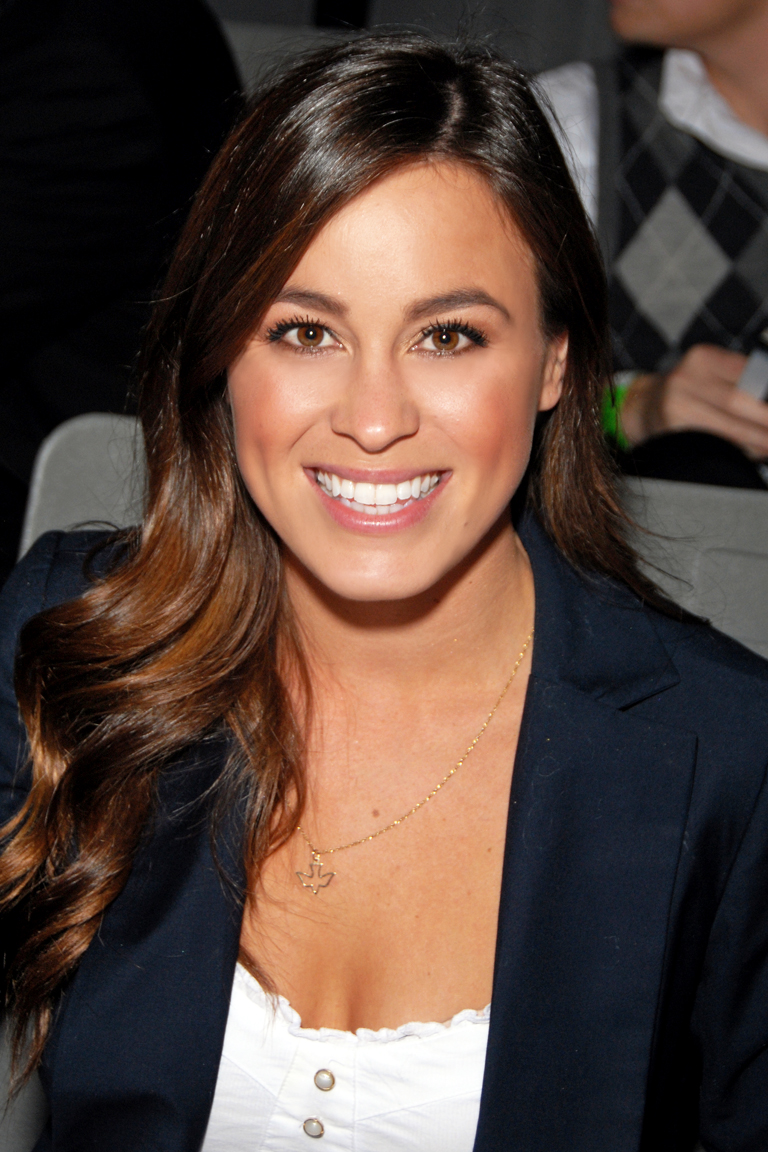
Raquel Beezley, Miss California USA 2008

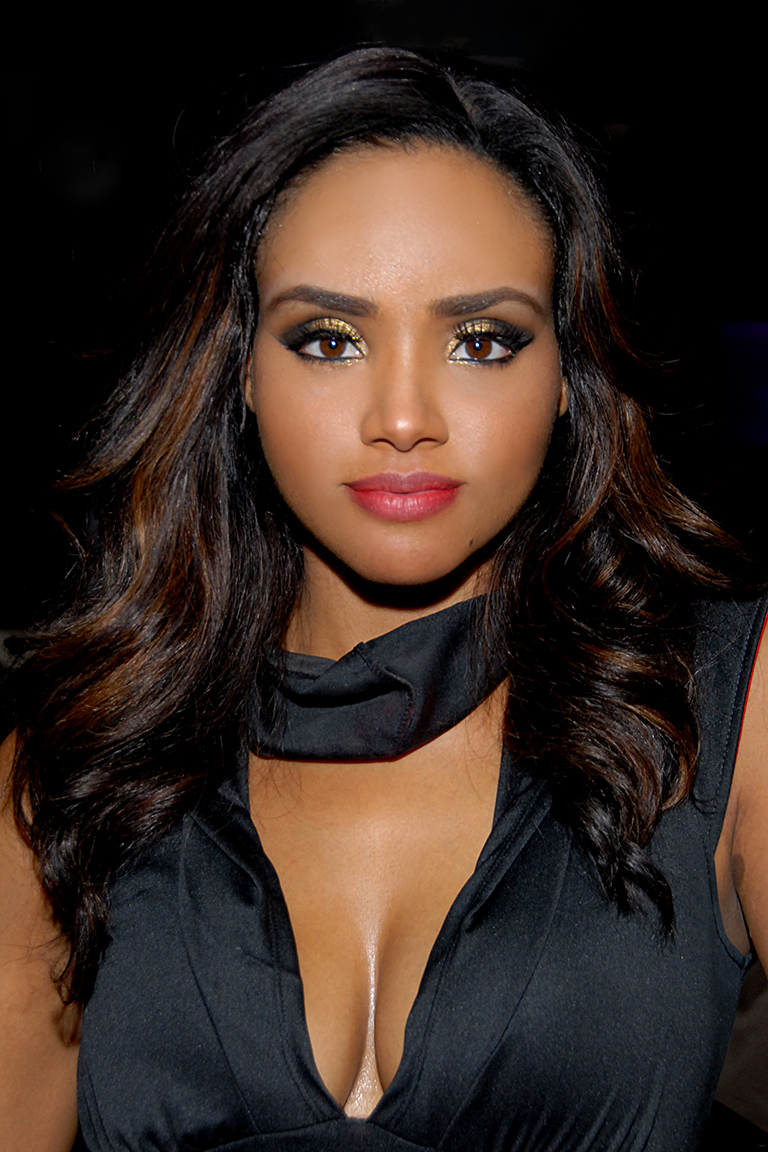
Meagan Tandy, Miss California USA 2007

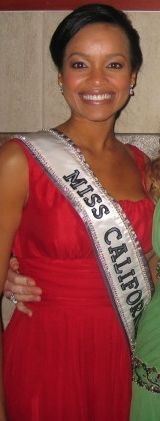
Tamiko Nash, Miss California USA 2006

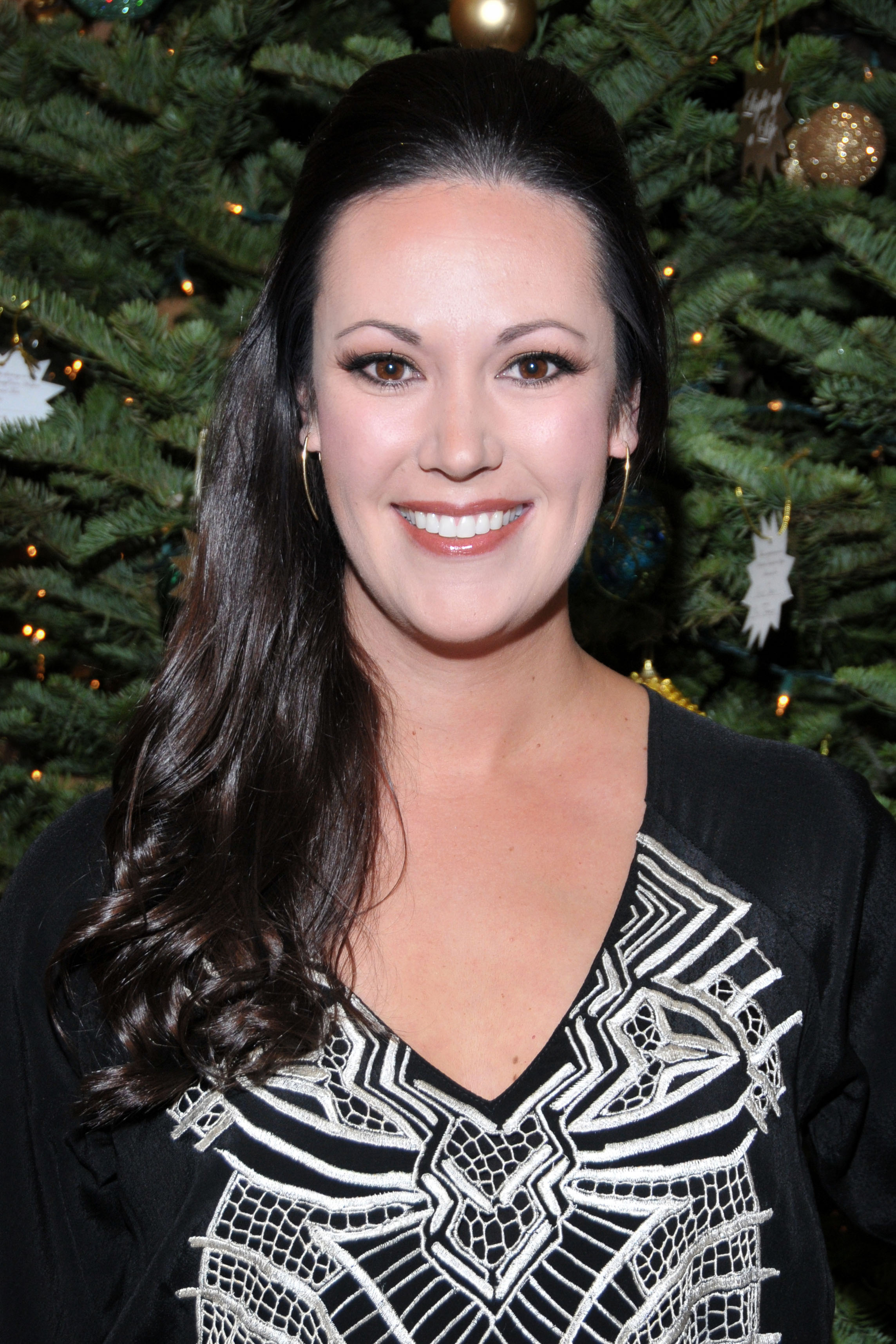
Ellen Chapman, Miss California USA 2004

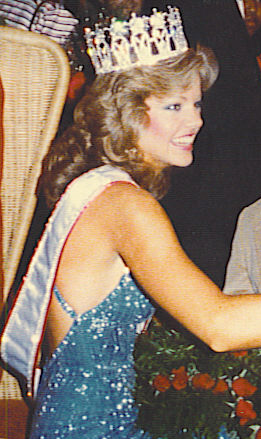
Julie Hayek, Miss California USA 1983 and Miss USA 1983

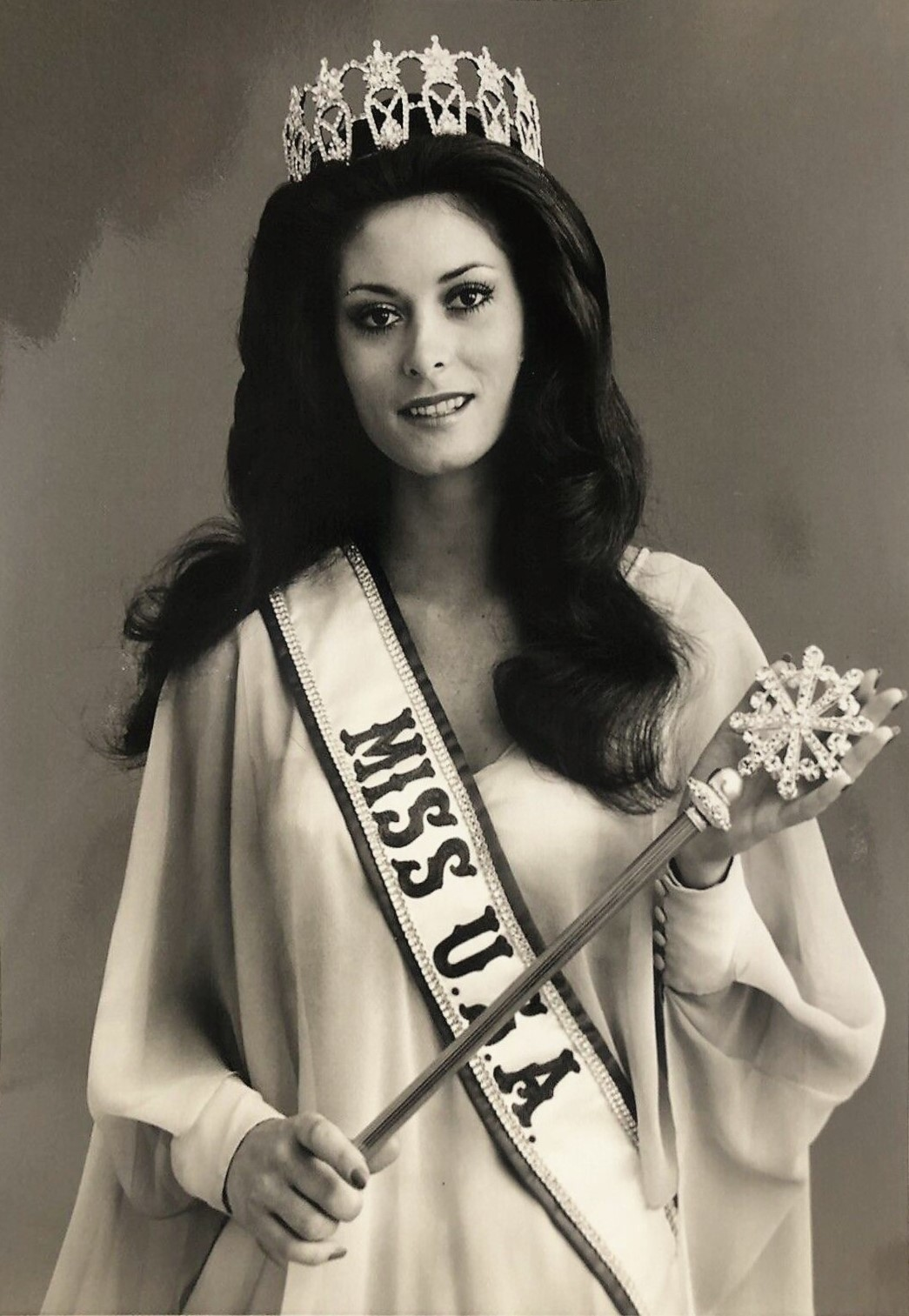
Summer Bartholomew, Miss California USA 1975 and Miss USA 1975

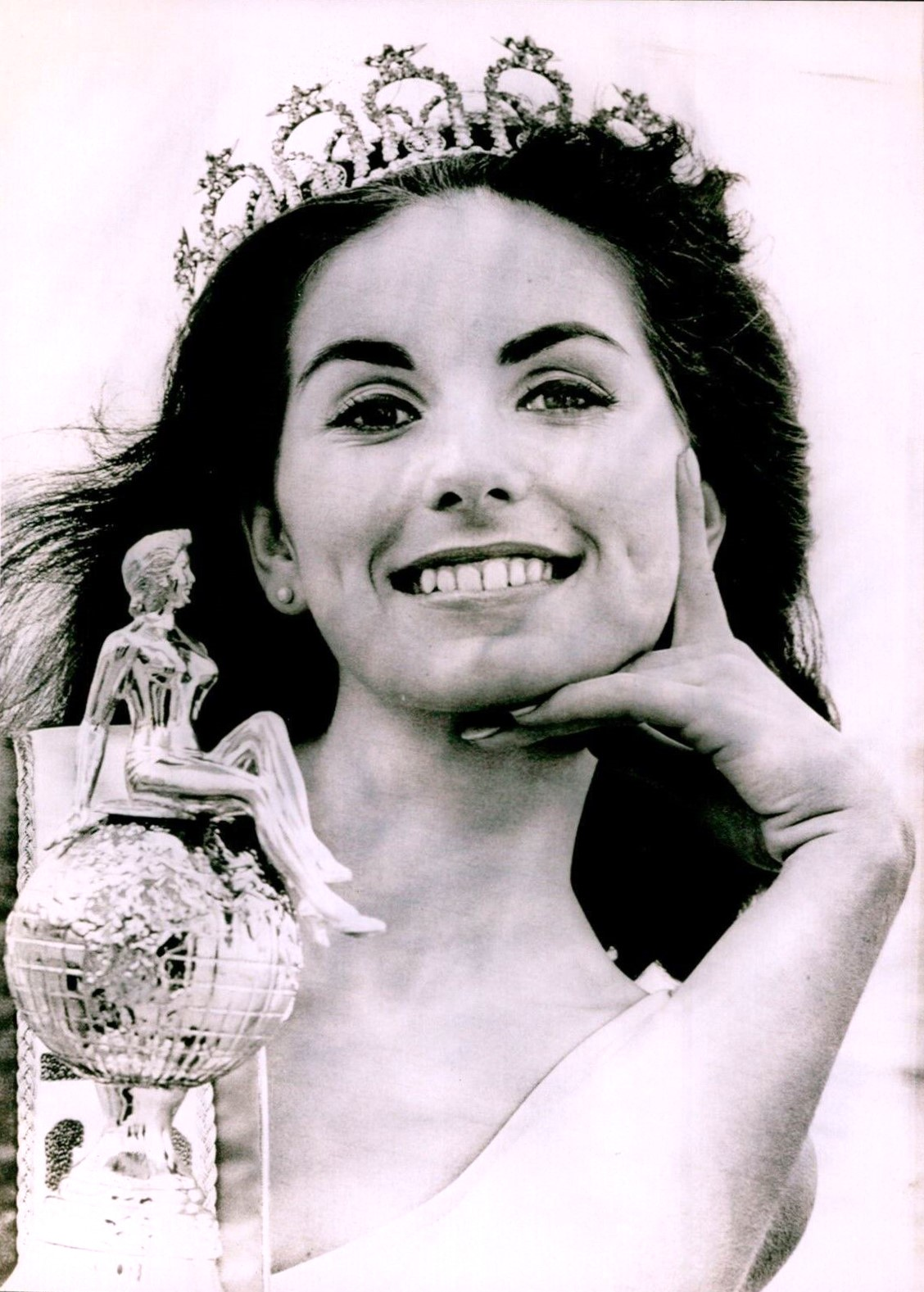
Maria Remenyi, Miss California USA 1966 and Miss USA 1966

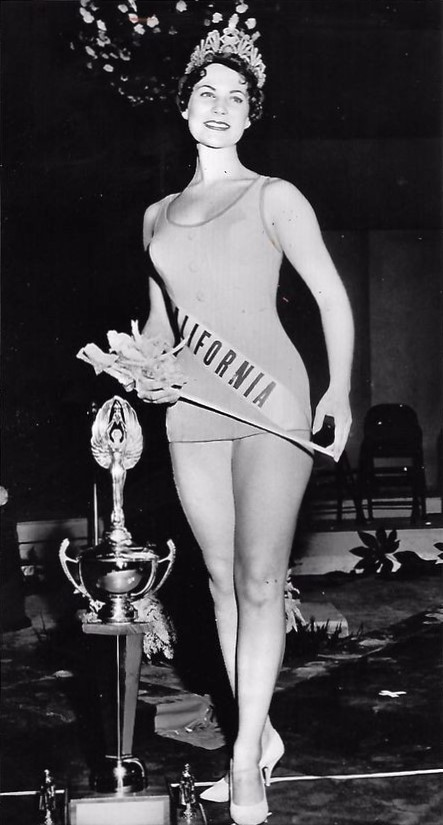
Terry Huntingdon, Miss California USA 1959 and Miss USA 1959

== Results summary ==
- Miss USAs: Terry Huntingdon (1959), Maria Remenyi (1966), Summer Bartholomew (1975), Julie Hayek (1983), Shannon Marketic (1992), Alyssa Campanella (2011)
- 1st Runners-Up: Pamela Stettler (1961), Susan Bradley (1967), Diana Magaña (1988), Shauna Gambill (1998), Brittany Hogan (2005), Tamiko Nash (2006), Carrie Prejean (2009)
- 2nd Runners-Up: Kim Hobson (1972), Diane Schock (1991), Angelique Breaux (1999)
- 3rd Runners-Up: Donna Schurr (1955), Marilyn Tindall (1962), Gayle Gorrell (1974), Pamela "Pam" Gergley (1977), Cynthia Kerby (1981), Meagan Tandy (2007)
- 4th Runners-Up: Francine Herack (1963), Troas Hayes (1969), Kelly Parsons (1986)
- Top 5: Nadia Mejía (2016)
- Top 10/12: Karin Morrell (1971), Carol Herrema (1973), Joni Pennock (1976), Donna Adrain (1978), Linda Fogarty (1979), Christina Faust (1989), Jane Olvera (1993), Tarah Peters (2002), Nicole Johnson (2010), Cassandra Kunze (2014), India Williams (2017), Kelley Johnson (2018), Allyshia Gupta (2020)
- Top 15/16/20: Marcella Roulette (1953), Sandra Constance (1954), Peggy Jacobson (1957), Donna Brooks (1958), Teri Janssen (1960), Jeanne Venables (1964), Kathryn Hage (1965), Suzanne Fromm (1968), Linda Hall (1970), Raquel Beezley (2008), Mabelynn Capeluj (2013), Tiffany Johnson (2022), Tianna Clark (2023), Samantha Ramos (2024), Acacia McBride (2026)

California holds a record of 54 placements at Miss USA, second overall behind Texas and ahead of South Carolina.

=== Awards ===
- Miss Congeniality: Jeanne Venables (1964), Cynthia Kerby (1981), Lori Dickerson (1987)
- Miss Photogenic: Maria Remenyi (1966), Cynthia Kerby (1981), Shannon Marketic (1992), Cassandra Kunze (2014), Acacia McBride (2026)
- Best State Costume: Suzanne Fromm (1968)

== Winners ==
Color key

- Winner
- Runner-Up
- Semifinalist

| Year | Name | Hometown | Age (Note: Age at the time of crowning) | Local Title | Placement at Miss USA | Special awards at Miss USA | Notes |
|---|---|---|---|---|---|---|---|
| 2026 | Acacia McBride | Calabasas | 28 | Miss Calabasas | Top 20 | Miss Photogenic | |
| 2025 | Kylie Chang | Cupertino | 21 | Miss Golden State | | | |
| 2024 | Samantha Ramos | Santa Monica | 24 | Miss Santa Monica | Top 20 | | |
| 2023 | Tianna Clark | Perris | 27 | Miss Perris | Top 20 | | |
| 2022 | Tiffany Johnson | Lancaster | 26 | Miss Lancaster | Top 16 | | Formerly a Los Angeles Clippers professional dancer |
| 2021 | Sabrina Lewis | Berkeley | 23 | Miss Berkeley | | | Later Miss California 2023 |
| 2020 | Allyshia Gupta | Los Angeles | 25 | Miss Los Angeles | Top 10 | | Contestant on season 29 of The Bachelor |
| 2019 | Erica Dann | San Francisco | 27 | Miss San Francisco | | | |
| 2018 | Kelley Johnson | Los Angeles | 24 | Miss Redondo Beach | Top 10 | | Previously Miss Colorado 2015 (2nd runner-up at Miss America 2015) |
| 2017 | India Williams | Lafayette | 20 | Miss Santa Monica | Top 10 | | |
| 2016 | Nadia Mejia | Diamond Bar | 20 | Miss Corona Del Mar | Top 5 | | Daughter of Gerardo Mejia and Kathy Eicher, Miss West Virginia USA 1989; Later First runner-up Miss Universe Ecuador 2024; Miss Universe Ecuador 2025 |
| 2015 | Natasha Martinez | Chino Hills | 23 | Miss Santa Anita Park | | | Formerly a Los Angeles Laker Girl |
| 2014 | Cassandra Kunze | San Diego | 20 | Miss Beverly Hills | Top 10 | Miss Photogenic | |
| 2013 | Mabelynn Capeluj | San Diego | 21 | Miss Greater San Diego | Top 15 | | Contestant in Nuestra Belleza Latina 2015 |
| 2012 | Natalie Pack | Palos Verdes | 22 | Miss Hoag Hospital | | | Contestant in cycle 12 of America's Next Top Model |
| 2011 | Katie Blair | Los Angeles | 23 | Miss Laurel Canyon | did not compete | | Originally first runner-up, assumed the title when Alyssa Campanella won Miss USA; Previously Miss Montana Teen USA 2006 and Miss Teen USA 2006 |
| 2011 | Alyssa Campanella | Los Angeles | 20 | Miss Hillsbourough | Miss USA 2011 | | Previously Miss New Jersey Teen USA 2007 (1st runner-up at Miss Teen USA 2007) |
| 2010 | Nicole Johnson | Westlake Village | 24 | Miss Sherwood | Top 10 | | Married to swimmer Michael Phelps |
| 2009 | Tami Farrell | Los Angeles | 25 | Miss Malibu | did not compete | | Originally first runner-up, assumed the title when Carrie Prejean was dethroned; Previously Miss Oregon Teen USA 2003 and Miss Teen USA 2003 |
| 2009 | Carrie Prejean | San Diego | 21 | Miss La Jolla | 1st Runner-Up | | Subject of the Miss USA 2009 same-sex marriage controversy; Dethroned by Miss California USA Organization |
| 2008 | Raquel Beezley | Barstow | 21 | Miss Barstow | Top 15 | | |
| 2007 | Meagan Tandy | Fontana | 21 | Miss Inland Empire | 3rd Runner-Up | | |
| 2006 | Tamiko Nash | Los Angeles | 26 | Miss North Los Angeles | 1st Runner-Up | | |
| 2005 | Brittany Hogan | Escondido | 20 | Miss City of San Diego | 1st Runner-Up | | |
| 2004 | Ellen Chapman | San Jose | 22 | Miss San Francisco-Bay Area | | | Sister of Sarah Chapman, Miss Nevada USA 2011 |
| 2003 | Candice Sanders | La Habre | 26 | Miss Greater Los Angeles | | | |
| 2002 | Tarah Peters | San Diego | 21 | Miss Greater San Diego | Top 12 | | |
| 2001 | Jennifer Jean Glover | Castro Valley | 21 | Miss Bay City | | | Previously Miss United States International 1999; Later Miss California 2002 |
| 2000 | Rebekah Ann Keller | Lakewood | 25 | Miss Greater Lakewood | | | Previously Miss California 1997 (4th runner-up at Miss America 1997) |
| 1999 | Angelique Sue Breaux | San Diego | 21 | Miss Vista | 2nd Runner-Up | | 1st Runner-up at Miss World USA 1999; Later Miss World USA 2000 (Top 10 at Miss World 2000) |
| 1998 | Shauna Gene Gambill | Acton | 21 | Miss Acton | 1st Runner-Up | | Previously Miss California Teen USA 1994 and Miss Teen USA 1994; Later Miss World USA 1998 (Top 10 at Miss World 1998) |
| 1997 | Alisa Marie Kimble | Lake Elsinore | 27 | Miss Lake Elsinore | | | |
| 1996 | Shauna Lyn Searles Grant | Tustin | 26 | Miss Tustin | | | Previously Miss California USA 1992, after Shannon Marketic was crowned Miss USA 1992 |
| 1995 | Deana Avila | Laguna Niguel | 24 | Miss Laguna Niguel | | | |
| 1994 | Toay Lynn Foster | Oxnard | 19 | Miss Tulare County | | | |
| 1993 | Jane Olvera | Reedley | 24 | Miss Central Valley | Top 12 | | Participated at Miss California 1990; First Hispanic Miss California USA |
| 1992 | Shauna Lyn Searles Grant | Tustin | 22 | Miss Sacramento Valley | did not compete | | Originally top 6 in Miss California USA, assumed the title when Shannon Marketic was crowned Miss USA; Later went on to win Miss California USA 1996 |
| 1992 | Shannon LaRhea Marketic | Malibu | 21 | Miss West Los Angeles | Miss USA 1992 | Miss Photogenic | Top 10 at Miss Universe 1992; Originally Miss Arizona Teen USA 1989, but dethroned after a auditing error was corrected |
| 1991 | Diane Lynn Schock | Fontana | 24 | Miss Claremont | 2nd runner-up | | |
| 1990 | Cynthia Lee "Cyndie" Nelson | Gilroy | 22 | Miss Gilroy | | | |
| 1989 | Christina Marie Faust | Westlake Village | 23 | Miss San Fernando Valley | Top 10 | | 1st runner-up at Miss California USA 1987; 2nd runner-up at Miss California USA 1988 |
| 1988 | Diana Rosa Rodriguez Magaña | Rancho Palos Verdes | 22 | Miss Los Angeles County | 1st runner-up | | Top 10 at Miss World 1988; 3rd runner-up at Miss California USA 1987 |
| 1987 | Lori Lynn Dickerson | Lodi | 20 | Miss San Joaquin County | | Miss Congeniality | |
| 1986 | Kelly Elizabeth Parsons | Chatsworth | 22 | Miss Northridge | 4th runner-up | | |
| 1985 | Zina Ponder | Long Beach | 22 | Miss Long Beach | | | |
| 1984 | Theresa L. Ring | San Diego | 21 | Miss Greater San Diego | | | 1987 Star Search spokesmodel |
| 1983 | Julie Lynne Hayek | Westwood | 22 | Miss Westwood | Miss USA 1983 | | 1st runner-up at Miss Universe 1983; 1st runner-up at Miss California USA 1982 |
| 1982 | Suzanne Paulette Dewames | Thousand Oaks | 19 | Miss Ventura County | | | Participated at Miss California USA 1981; Top 10 at Miss California 1985 |
| 1981 | Cynthia Ann "Cindy" Kerby | Westlake Village | 18 | Miss Las Virgenes | 3rd runner-up | Miss Photogenic; Miss Congeniality | |
| 1980 | Kari Susanne Lloyd | Thousand Oaks | 19 | Miss Woodland Hills | | | |
| 1979 | Linda Marie Fogarty | Fullerton | 19 | Miss Fullerton | Top 12 | | |
| 1978 | Donna Lynn Adrain | Anaheim | 21 | Miss Anaheim | Top 12 | | |
| 1977 | Pamela Lynn "Pam" Gergely | San Rafael | 19 | Miss Marin County | 3rd runner-up | | |
| 1976 | Joan Marie "Joni" Pennock | Northridge | 19 | Miss Los Angeles County | Top 12 | | 6th runner-up at Miss California USA 1975 |
| 1975 | Summer Robin Bartholomew | Merced | 23 | Miss Merced County | Miss USA 1975 | | 2nd runner-up at Miss Universe 1975; Previously Miss Oktoberfest 1973 |
| 1974 | Gayle Andrea Gorrell | Temple City | 20 | Miss Friendly El Monte-South El Monte | 3rd runner-up | | Rose Princess at the 1973 Pasadena Tournament of Roses; Later Miss Oktoberfest 1974 |
| 1973 | Carol Marie Herrema | Artesia | 19 | Miss Artesia-Cerritos | Top 12 | | |
| 1972 | Kim Christina Hobson | San Mateo | 20 | Miss San Francisco | 2nd runner-up | | |
| 1971 | Karin Dawn Klingler Morrell | Newcastle | 19 | Miss Auburn | Top 12 | | |
| 1970 | Linda Lee Hall | Van Nuys | 21 | Miss Los Angeles | Top 15 | | 3rd runner-up at Miss California USA 1969 |
| 1969 | Troas Kaye Hayes | Sacramento | 22 | Miss Metropolitan Sacramento | 4th runner-up | | |
| 1968 | Suzanne Fromm | Riverside | 19 | | Top 15 | Best State Costume; Top 15 Best in Swimsuit | Later Miss Rodeo California 1968 (second runner-up at Miss Rodeo America) |
| 1968 | Sharon McFarland | Apple Valley | 18 | | did not compete | | Resigned from the title |
| 1967 | Susan Ellen "Sue" Bradley | Tustin | 19 | | 1st runner-up | | |
| 1966 | Maria Judith Remenyi | El Cerrito | 20 | | Miss USA 1966 | Miss Photogenic | Top 15 at Miss Universe 1966 |
| 1965 | Kathryn Lee "Kathy" Hage | Santa Monica | 18 | Miss Santa Monica | Top 15 | | |
| 1964 | Jeanne Elaine Venables | Carmichael | 24 | Miss Carmichael | Top 15 | Miss Congeniality | |
| 1963 | Francine Cheryl Herack | Encino | 19 | Miss Hollywood | 4th runner-up | | |
| 1962 | Marilyn Ann Tindall | Hollywood | 21 | Miss Los Angeles | 3rd runner-up | | |
| 1961 | Pamela Ray Stettler | San Rafael | 18 | Miss San Rafael | 1st runner-up | | |
| 1960 | Teri Jean Janssen | Los Angeles | 17 | Miss Los Angeles | Top 15 | | Sister of David Janssen |
| 1959 | Terry Lynn Huntingdon | Mount Shasta | 19 | Miss Mount Shasta | Miss USA 1959 | | 2nd runner-up at Miss Universe 1959 |
| 1958 | Donna Kay Brooks | North Hollywood | 18 | Miss San Fernando Valley | Top 15 | | |
| 1957 | Peggy Jacobson | Downey | 18 | Miss Rosemead | Top 15 | | |
| 1956 | Shirlee Colleen Garner Witty | Wilmington | 20 | Miss Catalina | | | |
| 1955 | Donna Ellamae Schurr | Garden Grove | 18 | Miss Santa Ana | 3rd runner-up | | Top 5 at Miss California 1954 |
| 1954 | Sandra Lea Constance | Torrance | 18 | Miss Hollywood | Top 20 | | |
| 1953 | Marcella LaDyne Roulette | Inglewood | 21 | Miss Inglewood | Top 20 | | |
| 1952 | Gloria Jane Maxwell | Los Angeles | 20 | | | | |
