= Shannon Marketic =

American model

- Born: Shannon LaRhea Marketic; January 14, 1971 (age 55); Phoenix, Arizona, U.S.
- Beauty pageant titleholder
- Title: Miss California USA 1992; Miss USA 1992
- Major competitions: Miss California USA 1992 (Winner); Miss USA 1992 (Winner); Miss Universe 1992 (Top 10)

Shannon LaRhea Marketic (born January 14, 1971) is an American model and beauty pageant titleholder who was crowned Miss California USA 1992 and Miss USA 1992.

== Biography ==
=== Pageants ===
Marketic was crowned Miss Arizona Teen USA 1989 but held the title for only a week and a half after it was discovered an error had been made and she had actually placed first runner-up.

A few years later, Marketic won the Miss California USA 1992 title after being crowned Miss Malibu USA 1992, and went on to represent California in the Miss USA 1992 pageant, which was broadcast live from Wichita, Kansas in February of that year. She placed second in semifinal interview, sixth in swimsuit and evening gown, which allowed her to advance as one of the Top 6 finalists of the competition with the third highest semi-finals average score. After answering the judges' questions, she went into the final 3 in second place, eventually winning the Miss Photogenic award and the Miss USA title.

Marketic went on to compete in the 1992 Miss Universe pageant held in Bangkok, Thailand on May 8 and was one of 10 semifinalists who competed for the title. She eventually placed 8th overall. Her national costume was a cowgirl.

=== Sultan of Brunei incident ===
In 1997 Marketic sued Jefri Bolkiah, Prince of Brunei, claiming that she and other women were hired for promotional work but instead held as a "virtual prisoner", drugged and sexually abused. The Sultan denied the claims. Marketic's lawsuit named Miss USA 1997 Brandi Sherwood as also being a victim, however Sherwood declined to file her own lawsuit. After 18 months of litigation, a judge dismissed the suit on the grounds that the Sultan had sovereign immunity as head of state.
