= Carrie Prejean =

American beauty pageant contestant

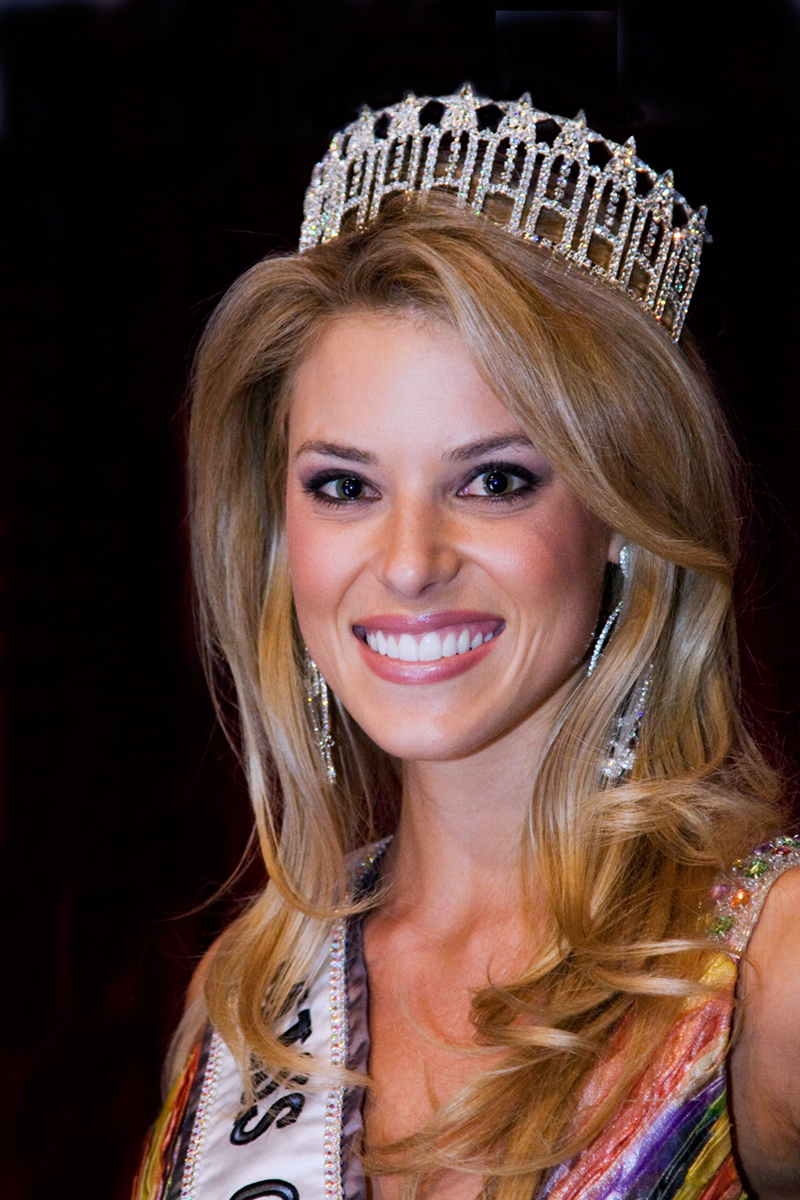
- Prejean in 2009
- Born: Caroline Michelle Prejean; May 13, 1987 (age 39); San Diego, California, U.S.
- Height: 5 ft 10 in (1.78 m)
- Spouse: Kyle Boller (m. 2010)
- Children: 2
- Beauty pageant titleholder
- Title: Miss California USA 2009
- Hair color: Blonde
- Eye color: Green
- Major competition: Miss USA 2009 (1st runner-up)

Caroline Michelle Prejean Boller (/preɪˈʒɑːn/ pray-ZHAHN; born May 13, 1987) is an American conservative activist, and former model and beauty pageant titleholder. She was crowned Miss California USA 2009 and later placed as the first runner-up at the Miss USA 2009 pageant. Prejean received widespread national media attention during the Miss USA pageant for her public opposition to same-sex marriage. She later lost her Miss California title over subsequent contractual disputes with the Donald Trump-run organization.

Following her pageant career, Prejean transitioned into conservative political activism, representing the Women for Trump coalition during the 2020 presidential campaign. She was appointed to the Religious Liberty Commission by Donald Trump in May 2025. She was removed from the commission in February 2026 following public clashes with witnesses during a hearing on antisemitism, in which she expressed opposition to Zionism, condemned Israel's conduct in Gaza, and defended Tucker Carlson and Candace Owens, while claiming to speak from a Catholic perspective.

== Early life ==
Prejean was born on May 13, 1987, in San Diego, California, to Francine (Coppola) and Wilbert Prejean. She was raised in an evangelical household in Vista, California. In 1996, Prejean's parents separated and started divorce proceedings; Prejean considered the divorce a "trauma that irrevocably shaped the rest of my life". The divorce was a bitter one with accusations of poor behavior and homosexuality on both sides. Custody proceedings lasted an entire decade, by which time Prejean and her sister were already grown up.

Prejean graduated in 2005 from Vista High School. She studied at San Diego Christian College, an evangelical private school, and attended the Rock Church, where she volunteered with their outreach ministries. She studied to become a special education teacher.

== Pageant career ==
In 2007, she competed in the Miss California USA 2008 beauty pageant and was first runner-up.

Prejean returned the following year and won the Miss California USA 2009 title, succeeding Raquel Beezley as California's representative to the Miss USA pageant. Prejean competed at the nationally televised Miss USA 2009 pageant in Las Vegas, Nevada on April 19, 2009, and placed first runner-up. Prejean's answer to her final question during the pageant became the subject of controversy.

=== Miss USA 2009 controversy ===
Prejean received nationwide attention over her response to a question about same-sex marriage during the 2009 Miss USA pageant. Prejean was asked by pageant judge Perez Hilton whether she believed every U.S. state should legalize same-sex marriage. She responded:

Well, I think it's great that Americans are able to choose one way or the other. We live in a land where you can choose same-sex marriage or opposite marriage. And, you know what, in my country, in my family, I think that, I believe that marriage should be between a man and a woman, no offense to anybody out there. But that's how I was raised and I believe that it should be between a man and a woman.

The media attention intensified after Hilton added a video blog post to his website, and made comments there and elsewhere, disparaging Prejean and her answer to the question. Hilton stated: "She gave an awful, awful answer that alienated so many people." He also told ABC News that she lost the crown because of how she answered the question. Prejean has also stated that she believes that her answer cost her the crown. Of that moment, Prejean wrote:

I was being dared—in front of the entire world—to give a candid answer to a serious question. I knew if I told the truth, I would lose all that I was competing for: the crown, the luxury apartment in New York City, the large salary—everything that went with the Miss USA title. I also knew, or suspected, that I was the frontrunner, and if I gritted my teeth and gave the politically correct answer, I could be Miss USA.

Prejean stated that she was told by Miss California USA pageant officials that she "need[ed] to not talk about" her faith and was pressured to apologize for her statement.

The National Organization for Marriage used footage from the pageant for a television advertisement that warned that same-sex marriage activists wanted to silence opposition. Prejean hired a Christian public relations firm.

On May 1, 2009, Prejean stated on On the Record w/ Greta Van Susteren that she did not have an opinion on civil unions for same-sex couples, but that she supports certain rights of same-sex couples, such as hospital visitations. She has stated that she would be willing to meet with representatives from California's largest gay rights group "as long as it's not political".

Donald Trump, who owned most of the Miss Universe Organization, defended Prejean's answer, saying that "Miss California has done a wonderful job" and that "It wasn't a bad answer. That was simply her belief." He then added that the question was "a bit unlucky" and that no matter which way she answered the question "she was going to get killed". Several elected officials, and political pundits criticized Hilton and defended Prejean for honestly stating her personal beliefs. In November, 2009, The New York Times opinion columnist Frank Bruni said her beliefs are representative of mainstream U.S. opinion on the issue, stating "while a majority of Americans believe that gay couples should be able to enter into unions with some of the legal protections of marriage," only "a minority believe that gays and lesbians should be permitted to 'marry,' per se."

=== Stripping of Miss California USA title and lawsuits ===
Pageant organizers investigated Prejean for violating the terms of her contract after a photograph of Prejean partially nude with her back turned to the camera appeared on a celebrity gossip blog. Prejean defended the shots as legitimate modeling but also claimed that the photographer was at fault because he continued to shoot her while the wind blew open her vest. Miss USA owner Donald Trump agreed, stating, "We are in the 21st century. We have determined the pictures taken are fine" and that "in some cases the pictures were lovely." Trump went on to compare Prejean's views on same sex-marriage as being in line with those of President Barack Obama, and National Organization for Marriage president Maggie Gallagher stated on May 5 that the release would not affect Prejean's role with her group.

Despite his initial support, Trump agreed to terminate Prejean's contract on June 10, 2009, citing "continued breach of contract issues". Prejean claimed that K2 Productions, producers of the Miss California USA pageant, wanted her to pose for Playboy and appear on the reality television show I'm a Celebrity... Get Me out of Here!, though K2 Productions executive Keith Lewis claimed he was simply notifying Prejean of all offers for appearances.

In August 2009, Prejean sued Miss California USA officials on a variety of civil grounds, including libel, slander, religious discrimination, and the unauthorized release of private medical records. K2 Productions and pageant officials filed counterclaims seeking the profits from Prejean's forthcoming book, which it claimed was written in violation of the Miss California USA contract, and the return of $5,200 loaned to Prejean for breast implants. On November 3, 2009, Prejean and K2 announced a settlement with undisclosed terms, with both sides dropping their lawsuits. CNN reported that Prejean's settlement with Miss California USA officials was prompted by the revelation of a sex tape; the homemade video was made when Prejean was 17 years old. TMZ reported that K2 agreed to pay $100,000 towards Prejean's legal bills, which did not cover them entirely, and that Prejean received no money from the settlement.

=== Memoir and media appearances ===
In November 2009, Prejean released a memoir titled Still Standing: The Untold Story of My Fight Against Gossip, Hate, and Political Attacks through conservative publisher Regnery Publishing. The book explores what Prejean believes were unfair attacks by those in the media that leaned left and what she characterized as "a vindictive smear campaign" from Hollywood, while also focusing on her conservative values. In an incident that occurred while promoting the book, Prejean left the set during an interview on Larry King Live, after King repeatedly questioned her on why she settled her lawsuit with the Miss California USA pageant, calling the host's questions "inappropriate".

== Political activity and activism ==
In 2020, she became an official member of the Donald Trump Campaign Advisory Board and represented the Women for Trump 2020 Coalition. She appeared on Fox News to promote Trump and conservative values.

In late August 2021, Prejean spoke at an Encinitas, California, school board meeting, announcing her plan to campaign against some of the school board members when they ran for reelection. She decried the mandatory masking at schools that was taking place in the face of the ongoing COVID-19 pandemic, stated that she would unmask her children, and that the pandemic was over.

In 2022, she argued on Fox News that a local school board Halloween event that had a drag queen was a front for child grooming. She stated "Every single one of these board members, we called them out for exactly who they are. They're groomers."

=== Religious Liberty Commission and 2026 removal ===
In May 2025, Prejean was appointed as a commissioner on the Religious Liberty Commission by President Donald Trump. In February 2026, commission Chairman Dan Patrick announced that he had removed her from the Religious Liberty Commission, stating that she had "hijack[ed] a hearing on antisemitism for [her] own personal and political agenda."

The removal came after some of Prejean's comments while questioning witnesses about the differences between anti-Zionism and antisemitism during a commission hearing on antisemitism earlier that week had sparked controversy. Prejean questioned Ari Berman, President of Yeshiva University, saying, "Catholics do not embrace Zionism, just so you know. So are all Catholics antisemites?" and asked the witnesses, who were testifying about their experiences with antisemitism on college campuses after the October 7 attacks, "are you willing to condemn what Israel has done in Gaza?"

During the hearing, Prejean defended Candace Owens and Tucker Carlson from charges of antisemitism. When asked by journalist Yair Rosenberg about antisemitic conspiracy theories promoted by Owens, including claims that Jews were responsible for the American Civil War and the Atlantic slave trade, Prejean said "I watched her show, and I have never heard anything out of her mouth that is anti-Semitic. So I'm not gonna make a statement on something that I haven't heard the full context of."

== Personal life ==
On July 2, 2010, Prejean married former NFL quarterback Kyle Boller in San Diego, California. They have two children.

On Easter Vigil in 2025, Prejean was confirmed into the Catholic Church.

Awards and achievements
Preceded by (Mississippi) Leah Laviano	Miss USA 1st Runner-Up; 2009	Succeeded by (Oklahoma) Morgan Woolard
Preceded by Raquel Beezley	Miss California USA; 2009	Succeeded by Tami Farrell
