= Miss Maine USA =

Beauty pageant competition

- Formation: 1952
- Type: Beauty pageant
- Headquarters: Malden
- Location: Massachusetts
- Members: Miss USA
- Official language: English
- Key people: Laurie Clemente; Anthony Clemente
- Website: Official website

The Miss Maine USA competition is the pageant that selects the representative for the state of Maine in the Miss USA pageant. The pageant is directed by The Clemente Organization, based in Malden, Massachusetts.

Maine has placed nine times at Miss USA. In 2006, Katee Stearns made the semi-finals, becoming the fifth woman from Maine and the first since 1977 to make the cut. In 2010, Katie Whittier became the first delegate from Maine to reach the top five, finishing 4th runner-up.

Five Miss Maine USAs were former Miss Maine Teen USA titleholders who competed at Miss Teen USA. Two also competed at Miss America.

Mykala Green of Biddeford was crowned Miss Maine USA 2026 on June 21, 2026 at DoubleTree by Hilton Hotel Boston North Shore in Danvers. She will represent Maine at Miss USA 2026.

== Gallery of titleholders ==
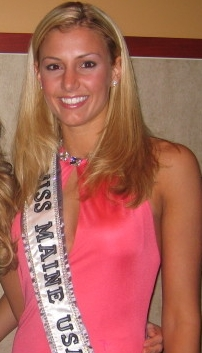
Katee Stearns, Miss Maine USA 2006

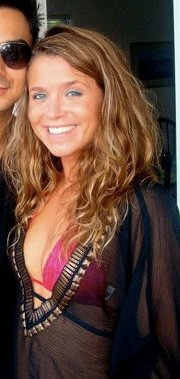
Erin Good, Miss Maine USA 2007

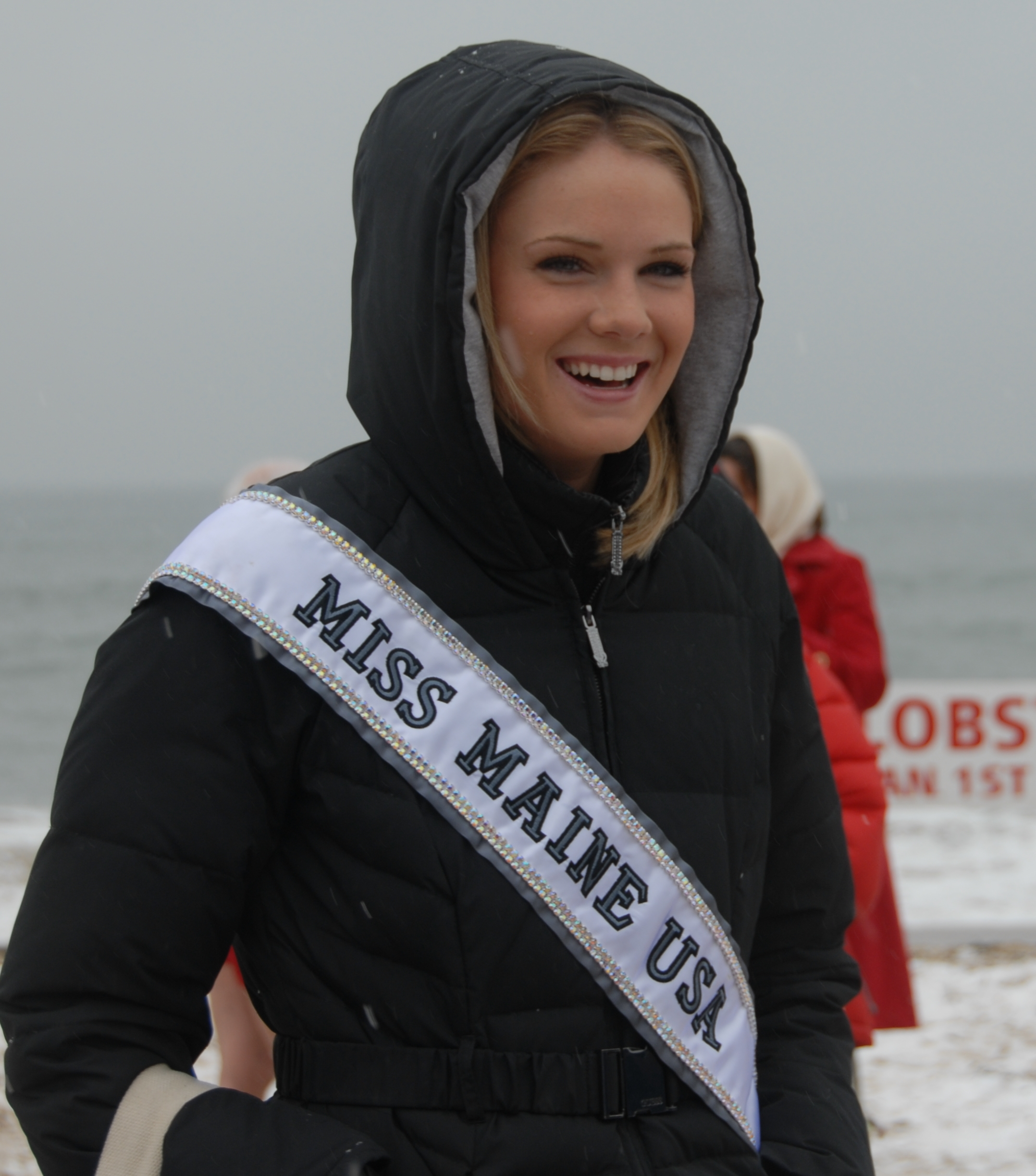
Katie Whittier, Miss Maine USA 2010

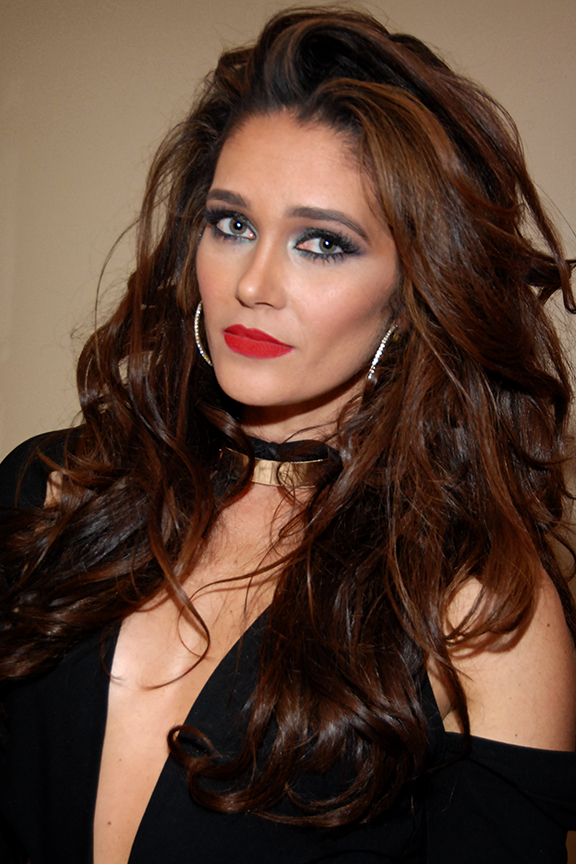
Heather Elwell, Miss Maine USA 2015

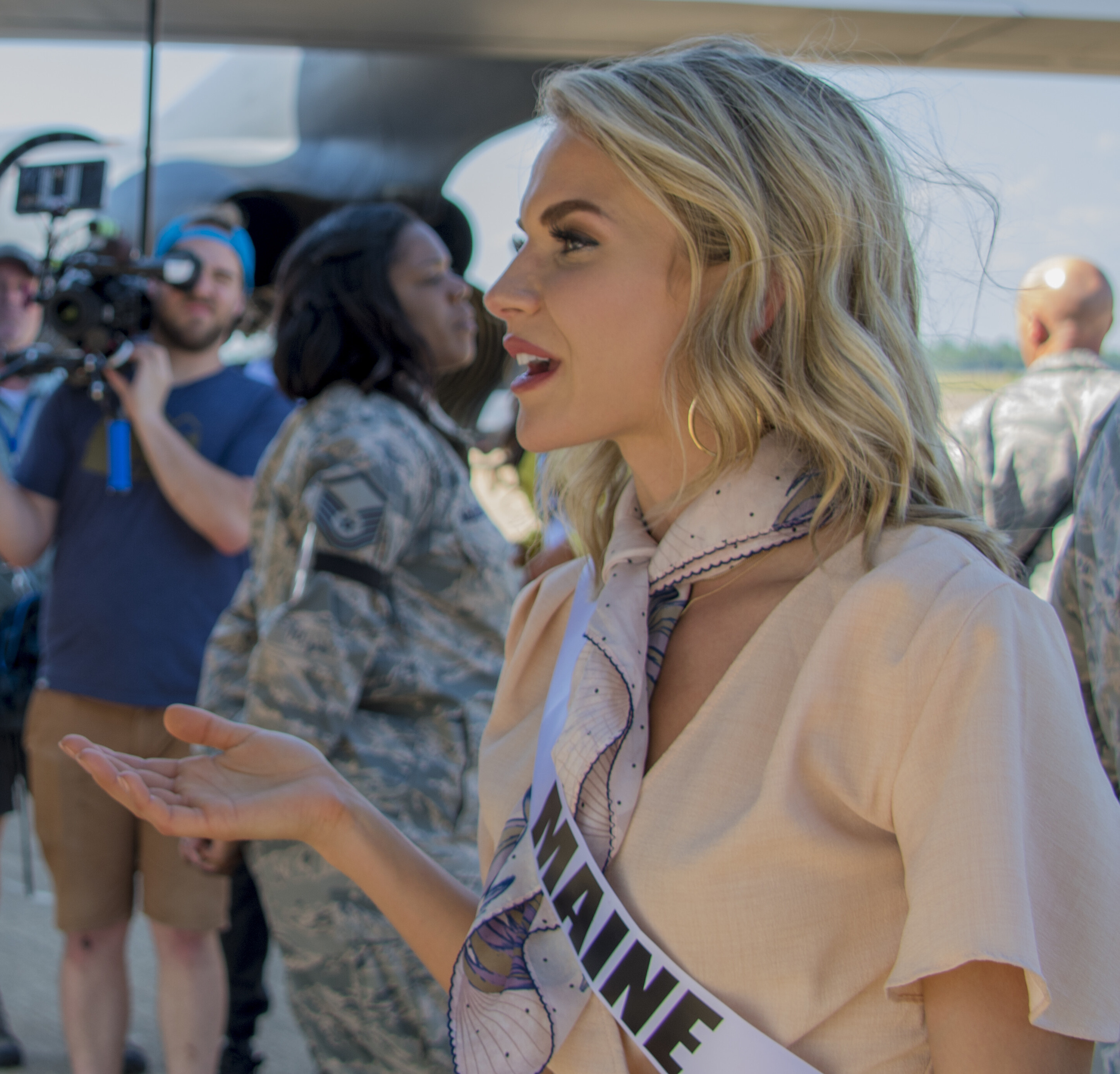
Marina Gray, Miss Maine USA 2018

== Results summary ==
=== Placements ===
- 4th runner-up: Katie Whittier (2010)
- Top 8: Ashley Lynn Marble (2011)
- Top 10/12: Tina Ann Brown (1977), Marina Gray (2018)
- Top 15/16/20: Jackie Lee (1953), Carolyn Komant (1959), Margaret McAleer (1970), Katee Stearns (2006), Rani Williamson (2012), Shelby Howell (2025)

Maine holds a record of 10 placements at Miss USA.

=== Awards ===
- Miss Photogenic: Shelby Howell (2025)

== Winners ==
Color key

- Declared as Winner
- Ended as runner-up
- Ended as one of the finalists or semifinalists

Year	Name	Hometown	Age^{1}	Local title	Placement at Miss USA	Special awards at Miss USA	Notes
2026	Mykala Green	Biddeford	25	Miss Biddeford			
2025	Shelby Howell	Bangor	25	Miss Bangor	Top 20	Miss Photogenic	
2024	Anne Baldridge	Portland	25	Miss Casco Bay			
2023	Juliana Morehouse Locklear	Portland	23	Miss Casco Bay			Daughter of Lynn Jenkins Morehouse, Miss North Carolina USA 1994
2022	Elizabeth Kervin	Winterport	20	Miss Waldo County			Shortest reigning Miss Maine USA (8 months or 245 days)
2021	VeronicaIris Bates	Portland	21				Active member of the United States Air Force
2020	Julia Frances Van Steenberghe	Old Town	21				Longest reigning Miss Maine USA (1 year, 7 months and 10 days)
2019	Lexie Elston	Windham	23				Later Miss Maine Earth USA 2021
2018	Marina Gray	Trenton	23		Top 10		
2017	Brooke Harris	Lee	25				
2016	Marisa Butler	Standish	21				Previously People's Choice at National Sweetheart 2013; Later Miss World America 2018 and semi-finalist Miss World 2018 (Top 30) (Miss World Sports Woman 2018); Later Miss Maine Earth USA 2020; Later Miss Earth USA 2021 and 1st Runner-up (Miss Air) Miss Earth 2021
2015	Heather Elwell	West Bath	26				Placed first runner-up at Miss Maine-USA in 2012, 2013, and 2014 before winning the title in 2015. Competed at Miss Florida-USA in 2008 and 2009.
2014	Samantha Dahlborg	Gorham	19				
2013	Ali Clair	South China	23	Miss Old Port			
2012	Rani Williamson	Portland	25		Top 16		
2011	Ashley Marble	Topsfield	27		Top 8		Originally first runner-up, assumed the title after Emily Johnson's resignation and competed in Miss USA; Previously Miss Maine Teen USA 2000, Marble is the longest tenured return to nationals as Ashley won her teen title 11 years ago
2011	Emily Johnson	South Portland	22		did not compete		Resigned on April 17, 2011, so she could attend her sister's wedding on the date of the Miss USA pageant.
2010	Katie Whittier	New Gloucester	26		4th runner-up		
2009	Ashley Underwood	Benton	24	Miss Benton			Contestant on Survivor: Redemption Island
2008	Kaetlin Parent	Van Buren	20				Previously Miss Maine Teen USA 2005
2007	Erin Good	Fairfield	22				Dr. Good received her Doctor of Pharmacy degree from the Massachusetts College of Pharmacy and Health Sciences in May 2012
2006	Katee Stearns	Orono	19		Top 15		Previously Maine's Junior Miss 2004
2005	Erica Commeau	Brewer	20				
2004	Mackenzie Davis	Hallowell	24				Past director of the Miss Maine USA and Miss Maine Teen USA pageants.
2003	Lacey Hutchinson	Biddeford	23				
2002	Su-Ying Leung	Oakland		Miss Oakland			
2001	Melissa Bard	Winslow					
2000	Jennifer Hunt	Rumford					Previously Miss Maine Teen USA 1994
1999	Heather Coutts	Portland					Later Mrs. Maine America 2006 under her married name, Heather Clark.
1998	Kathy Morse	Standish					
1997	Stephanie Worcester	Winthrop	20				
1996	Julann Vadnais	Biddeford	23				
1995	Kerri Malinowski	Pittston					Previously Miss Maine Teen USA 1991
1994	Colleen Brink	Gorham		Miss Gorham			
1993	Jodi Cutting	Waterville		Miss Waterville			
1992	Linda Kiene	Scarborough					Previously Miss Maine Teen USA 1986
1991	Melissa Oliver	South Portland					
1990	Leigh Bubar	Sanford					
1989	Kirsten Blakemore	Brunswick					
1988	Suzanne Grenier	Scarborough		Miss Scarborough			
1987	Ginger Dawn Kilgore	South Portland					
1986	Annie Lewis	Portland					
1985	Tracie Samara	Portland					
1984	Vickie Lynn Gay	Oxford	23				
1983	Rosemarie Hemond	Minot					
1982	Theresa Cloutier	South Portland					
1981	Judy Lynn Footer	Bath					
1980	Victoria Elias	Benton					
1979	Valerie Crooker	Brunswick					Later Miss Maine 1980
1978	Catherine Ursula Ledue	Portland					
1977	Tina Brown	Portland	21		Top 12		
1976	Dawn St. Clair	Waterville					
1975	Denise Hill	Orono					
1974	Rebecca Titcomb	Houlton	19				
1973	Carlene Quimby	Auburn					
1972	Cynthia Luce	Sugarloaf Mountain					
1971	Ruth McCleery	Farmington					
1970	Margaret McAleer	Waterville	20		Top 15		Represented Maine in Miss World USA 1970
1969	Elaine Bolduce	Winslow					
1968	Cheryl Campbell	Skowhegan					
1967	Marlo Williams	Bangor					
1966	Susan Bartash	Rumford					
1965	Georgia Wilson	Portland					
1964	Corneille "Connie" Edwards	Mechanic Falls					
1963	Laurel Barker	Portland					
1962	Karen J. Henderson	South Portland					
1961	Barbara Dyer	Dexter					
1960	Terry Suzanne Tripp	Lewiston					Previously Miss Maine 1958
1959	Carolyn Komant	Kittery	18		Top 15		
1958	Karen Hanson	Cumberland Center					
1957	Roberta Aymie	Jackman					
1956	Did not compete						
1955	Did not compete						
1954	Did not compete						
1953	Jackie Lee	Cape Neddick	22		Top 20		
1952	Jean Marie Lemire	Old Town					

^{1} Ages at the time of the crowning
