= Miss USA 1999 =

48th Miss USA pageant

- Date: February 4, 1999
- Presenters: Shemar Moore; Julie Moran; Ali Landry
- Entertainment: Collin Raye; The Atomic Fireballs
- Venue: Grande Palace Theatre, Branson, Missouri
- Broadcaster: CBS; KOLR
- Winner: Kimberly Pressler; New York
- Congeniality: Cara Jackson (Arizona)
- Photogenic: Elyzabeth Pham (Wisconsin)

Miss USA 1999 was the 48th Miss USA pageant, held at the Grande Palace Theatre in Branson, Missouri on February 4, 1999. Kimberly Pressler became the fourth former Miss Teen USA state delegate in five years to win or inherit the Miss USA title.

At the conclusion of the final competition, Kimberly Pressler of New York, was crowned by outgoing titleholder Shawnae Jebbia of Massachusetts. Pressler became the fourth titleholder from New York, following Shanna Moakler four years prior as Miss USA 1995. However, as Moakler inherited the crown after Chelsi Smith won Miss Universe 1995, this is the third outright win for New York, and the first in twenty years since Mary Therese Friel won Miss USA 1979.

After months of negotiation, Branson was announced as the pageant's location in November 1998. City officials spent $125,000 of tax money to host the pageant in Branson in the hope that it would encourage tourism but admitted after the pageant that it was not worth the cost. Sponsors contributed a further $1 million towards the hosting of the event. The pageant had previously been held in Shreveport, Louisiana from 1997 to 1998.

Shemar Moore hosted the pageant for the only time, and color commentary was added by Miss USA 1996 Ali Landry and Julie Moran, for the second consecutive year. Entertainment was provided by Collin Raye and The Atomic Fireballs.

== Results ==
=== Placements ===
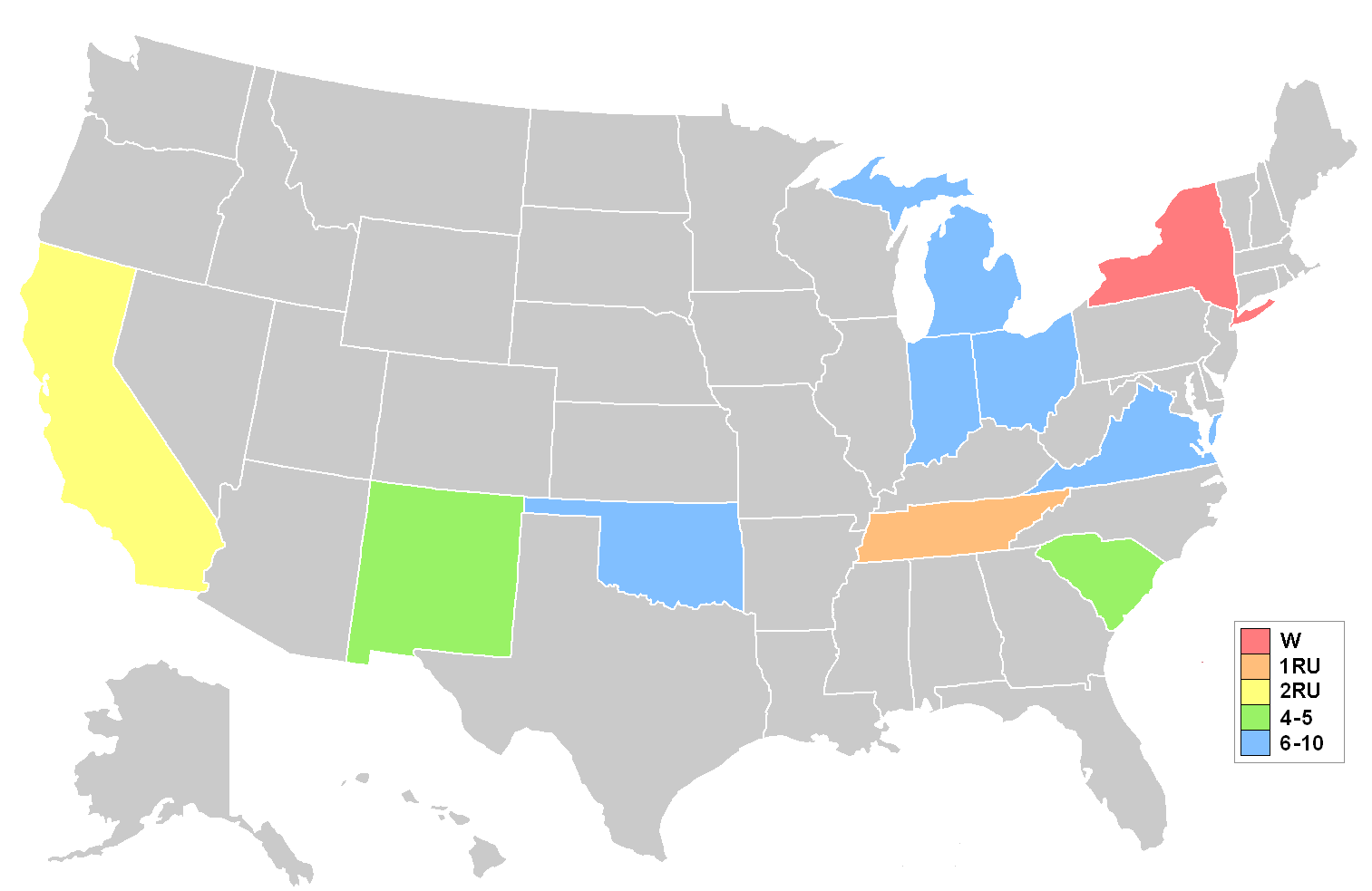
Map showing placements by state

Final results	Contestant
Miss USA 1999	(New York (state)) New York – Kimberly Pressler
1st Runner-Up	Tennessee – Morgan Tandy High
2nd Runner-Up	California – Angelique Breaux
Top 5	South Carolina – Lauren Poppell; New Mexico – Michelle Rios
Top 10	Indiana – Pratima Yarlagadda; Virginia – Kellie Lightbourn; Oklahoma – Dia Webb; Ohio – Melinda Miller; Michigan – Shannon Grace Clark

=== Special awards ===
- Miss Congeniality: Cara Jackson (Arizona)
- Miss Photogenic: Elyzabeth Pham (Wisconsin)
- Style Award: Kellie Lightbourn (Virginia)
- Best in Swimsuit: Lauren Poppell (South Carolina)

== Delegates ==
The Miss USA 1999 delegates were:

- Alabama – Doree Walker
- Alaska – Anna Ruble
- Arizona – Cara Jackson
- Arkansas – Allison Heavener
- California - Angelique Breaux
- Colorado – Susan Manuello
- Connecticut – Christina D'Amico
- Delaware – Jackie Pilla
- (Washington, D.C.) District of Columbia – Amy Alderson
- Florida – Melissa Quesada
- (Georgia (U.S. state)) Georgia – Meredith Young
- Hawaii – Trini Leilani Kaopuiki
- Idaho – Amy Ambrose
- Illinois – Christina Lam
- Indiana – Pratima Yarlagadda
- Iowa – Jaclyn Solinger
- Kansas – Amanda Carraway
- Kentucky – Lori Menshouse
- Louisiana – Melissa Bongiovanni
- Maine – Heather Coutts
- Maryland – Kelly Donohue
- Massachusetts – Jennifer Krafue
- Michigan – Shannon Grace Clark
- Minnesota – Crystal VanDenBerg
- Mississippi – Kara Babski
- Missouri – Teri Bolinger
- Montana – Michon Zink
- Nebraska – WaLynda Sipple
- Nevada – Shaynee Smith
- New Hampshire – Candice Royal
- New Jersey – Melissa McLaughlin
- New Mexico – Michelle Rios
- (New York (state)) New York – Kimberly Pressler
- North Carolina – Joy Hall
- North Dakota – Shayna Bank
- Ohio – Melinda Miller
- Oklahoma – Dia Webb
- Oregon – Amy Nelson
- Pennsylvania – Melissa Godshall
- Rhode Island – Claire DeSimone
- South Carolina – Lauren Poppell
- South Dakota – Shawna Gross
- Tennessee – Morgan Tandy High
- Texas – Carissa Nicole Blair
- Utah – Rachel Rasmussen
- Vermont – Nicole Lewis
- Virginia – Kellie Lightbourn
- (Washington (state)) Washington – Tammy Jansen
- West Virginia – Amanda Burns
- Wisconsin – Elyzabeth Pham
- Wyoming – Arnica Bryant

== Judges ==
- Dennis Basso
- Dr. Joyce Brothers
- Kelly LeBrock
- Cheech Marin
- Michelle Phillips
- Kevin Scott Richardson
- Andre Rison
- Stuart Weitzman

== See also ==
- Miss Teen USA 1999
- Miss Universe 1999
