= Kimberly Pressler =

American sports reporter, businesswoman, model and beauty pageant titleholder

- Born: May 21, 1977 (age 49); Las Vegas, Nevada, U.S.
- Occupations: Sports Reporter; Businesswoman; Beauty queen
- Beauty pageant titleholder
- Title: Miss New York Teen USA 1994; Miss New York USA 1999; Miss USA 1999
- Major competitions: Miss New York Teen USA 1994 (Winner); Miss Teen USA 1994 (Unplaced); Miss New York USA 1999 (Winner); Miss USA 1999 (Winner); Miss Universe 1999 (Unplaced)

Kimberly Ann Pressler (born May 21, 1977) is an American sports reporter, businesswoman, model and beauty pageant titleholder who won Miss USA 1999. She currently works for FOX on Professional Bowlers Association (PBA) telecasts. Ms. Pressler has been featured in People Magazine, TIME, and voted one of Stuff Magazine's "101 Sexiest Women in the World." Additionally, Pressler is also Chief Financial Officer (CFO) of Dane Herron Industries, a California-based company that specializes in the construction of dirt bike parks, skateparks, track building, event production and stunt coordinating, worldwide.

== Early life ==
Pressler was born in Las Vegas, Nevada to Staff Sergeant Stan Pressler (Air-Force, Retired) and homemaker Michelle Pressler (Kulczyk). While Ms. Pressler's father was an active airman; she spent her early childhood living the military life in Nevada, California, and Germany before ultimately residing in Western New York where Kimberly completed her schooling, graduating from Ten Broeck Academy of Franklinville.

Kimberly continued her education attending Clarion University of Pennsylvania where she majored in international business before moving on to working full-time for the Department of Energy (DOE) at a nuclear facility in Upstate New York.

== Pageant History ==
=== Miss New York Teen USA ===
Pressler captured her first state title in 1994 as Miss New York Teen USA and went on to represent her state the following August in the nationally televised Miss Teen USA pageant.

=== Miss New York USA ===
In November 1998, Kimberly was crowned Miss New York USA, one of only four women to seize both the Miss New York Teen USA and Miss New York USA titles in both pageants' histories.

=== Miss USA ===
The following February (1999), Pressler competed at Miss USA 1999, held in Branson, Missouri. There, she became only the fourth woman from her state to win the Miss USA title, beating press favorites Miss Tennessee USA Morgan Tandy High (the eventual 1st runner-up) and Miss California USA Angelique Breaux.

As Miss USA, Kimberly Pressler was an official spokesperson for Breast and Ovarian Cancer Research and helped raise millions for the cause while working closely with the Carol M. Baldwin Research Foundation.

=== Miss Universe ===
In May 1999, Pressler represented the US at Miss Universe 1999, held in Trinidad and Tobago. Her national costume was a Native American. She was unplaced, officially ending the USA's 22-year streak from 1977 to 1998.

=== Post pageant involvement ===
Pressler hosted the Miss Massachusetts USA, and Miss Massachusetts Teen USA pageants and regularly judges state pageants for the Miss USA & Miss Teen USA systems. In December 2012, Kimberly was amongst the judges that nominated Erin Brady from East Hampton, Connecticut as Miss Connecticut USA 2013. In June 2013 Erin went on to win the national title of Miss USA 2013.

== Television ==
Within a month of completing her reign as Miss USA, Ms. Pressler was hired by MTV Network's "Senseless Acts of Video" where she hosted and performed stunts for three seasons. During her two years with MTV Networks, she also hosted numerous other shows, including TRL, "Fast and Famous" and "Becoming". Kimberly was hired by NBC to host "Adrenaline X", an hour long series about extreme sports. Since that time the series has been syndicated worldwide.

From 2004 to 2006 Kimberly hosted and pit reported for both the "WPSA ATV Championships" on ESPN as well as the "WPSA Snowcross Championships" on the SPEED Channel. In addition, Kimberly was the pit reporter/host for the "Red Bull X Fighters" world tour for three seasons (2006–08). She traveled throughout the world hosting the LIVE freestyle motocross competition that routinely brought in crowds of 40,000 fans.

In 2007, Pressler was heard reporting for the Summer X Games XIII for ESPN and ABC. In 2008, Kimberly had the honor of being the only female pit reporter to participate in all three X Games competitions held in the United States that year, beginning with the "Winter X Games" in Aspen, Colorado, "NAVY Moto X Championships" in San Diego, California and again for the "Summer X Games" in Los Angeles. Kimberly can even be seen reporting in ESPN's theatrically released movie X GAMES 3D. Kimberly reported for X Games until the end of 2008, before departing on maternity leave.

In early 2009, Kimberly was brought on as the host of the "ACIS Fitness National Championships" for FOX College Sports. She again was asked to host/pit report for the "Red Bull X Fighters" world tour in Texas for ABC Sports. In mid-2009 Kimberly was also the pit reporter for ESPN2 and ABC's Traxxas TORC Series off-road racing coverage. That same year, Ms. Pressler was heard co-hosting the onsite coverage of the Red Bull New Year No Limits LIVE, when Travis Pastrana jumped from the Long Beach Pier onto a moving barge in front of 75,000 on-lookers. This was the second time Kimberly had taken part in a Red Bull New Year's Eve event, the previous time in 2007.

In 2010, Ms. Pressler signed on to host Truck Academy on the Outdoor Channel for one season. Upon completion of that series Kimberly became the laneside reporter for the Professional Bowlers Association (PBA) on ESPN, making her debut at the 2010 World Series of Bowling. She remained in this role through the 2018 PBA season on ESPN. In August, 2018, the PBA announced that Pressler would continue as laneside reporter when the PBA Tour coverage moves to Fox Sports for the 2019 season. She remained a staple on Fox PBA broadcasts through the 2025 season, frequently hosting an interview segment called "Pressing Questions with Kimberly Pressler." Ahead of the 2026 PBA Tour season, Pressler announced on her Facebook page that "after 15 unforgettable seasons my collaboration with the PBA has come to an end, as Lucky Strike Entertainment [parent company of the PBA] moves in a different direction with its on-air talent for the 2026 season."

In June 2013, Ms. Pressler was seen covering the Red Bull X Fighters World Tour Series, live from Osaka, Japan on FUEL TV, J Sports 3 in Japan.

Awards and achievements
| Preceded by Shawnae Jebbia | Miss USA; 1999 | Succeeded by Lynnette Cole |
| Preceded by Susan Wisdom | Miss New York USA; 1999 | Succeeded by Melissa Huggins |
| Preceded by Tara Campbell | Miss New York Teen USA; 1994 | Succeeded by Renee Griggs |
