= Shauna Gambill =

American model (born 1976)

- Born: 1976 or 1977 (age 49–50)
- Beauty pageant titleholder
- Title: Miss California Teen USA 1994 Miss Teen USA 1994; Miss Teen USA 1994; Miss California USA 1998; Miss World America 1998
- Hair color: Blonde
- Eye color: Blue
- Major competitions: Miss California Teen USA 1994; (Winner); Miss Teen USA 1994; (Winner); Miss California USA 1998; (Winner); Miss USA 1998; (1st Runner-Up); Miss World America 1998; (Winner); Miss World 1998; (Top 10)

Shauna Gambill (born 1976 or 1977) is an American model and beauty queen who won Miss Teen USA 1994 and also competed in the Miss USA 1998 and Miss World 1998 pageants.

Gambill first won the Miss California Teen USA title in late 1993. In August 1994 she competed in the Miss Teen USA in the national pageant televised live from Biloxi, Mississippi. Her performance in the preliminary competition placed her fourth among the top twelve semi-finalists, but her scores were consistently high throughout the three final rounds of competition, ranking highest in swimsuit (16 August). Having impressed the finals judges, Gambill, aged 17, was crowned Miss Teen USA at the end of the pageant broadcast.

In 1997, two years after passing on the Miss Teen USA crown, she won the Miss California USA 1998 title. Gambill then competed at Miss USA 1998, where she placed first runner-up to Shawnae Jebbia of Massachusetts.

Gambill attended Highland High School in Palmdale, California and was valedictorian of her class.
