= Miss Maine Teen USA =

Beauty pageant competition

- Formation: 1983
- Type: Beauty pageant
- Headquarters: Malden
- Location: Massachusetts
- Members: Miss Teen USA
- Official language: English
- Key people: Laurie Clemente; Anthony Clemente
- Website: Official Website

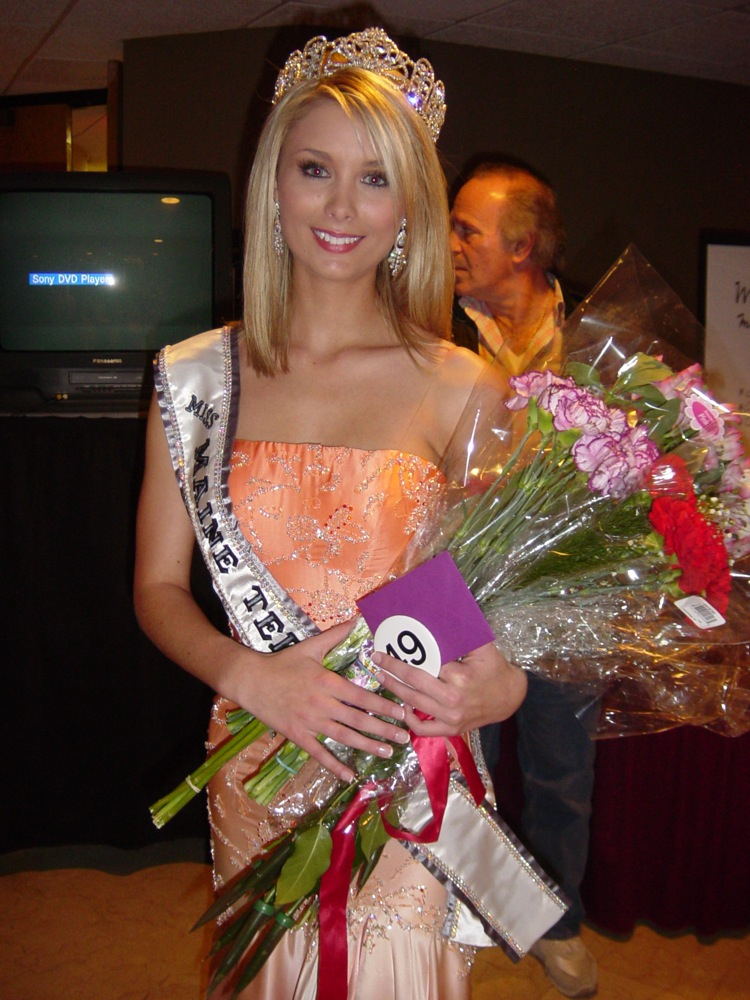
Donna Schleiper after being crowned Miss Maine Teen USA 2006

The Miss Maine Teen USA competition is the pageant that selects the representative for the state of Maine in the Miss Teen USA pageant. The pageant is directed by The Clemente Organization.

Maine is one of the least successful states at Miss Teen USA, having placed only five times. Their highest placement was in 1995, when Kathryn "Katie" Aselton finished 1st runner-up to Keylee Sue Sanders.

Four Maine teens have gone on to win the Miss Maine USA title, and five competed at Miss USA.

Sadie Coffey of Ogunquit was crowned Miss Maine Teen USA 2026 on June 21, 2026 at DoubleTree by Hilton Hotel Boston North Shore in Danvers. She will represent Maine at Miss Teen USA 2026.

== Results summary ==
=== Placements ===
- 1st runners-up: Kathryn "Katie" Aselton (1995)
- Top 12: Jill Mellen (1993)
- Top 15/16/20: Ashley Alden (2003), Alexis Mcilwain (2011), Grace Morey (2020), Jazmine Werner (2025)

Maine holds a record of 6 placements at Miss Teen USA.

=== Awards ===
Best in Activewear: Jazmine Werner (2025)

== Winners ==
- Declared as Winner
- Ended as runner-up
- Ended as one of the finalists or semifinalists

Year	Name	Hometown	Age^{1}	Local title	Placement at Miss Teen USA	Special awards at Miss Teen USA	Notes
2026	Sadie Coffey	Ogunquit	16	Miss Ogunquit Teen			
2025	Jazmine Werner	Cumberland	17	Miss Seacoast Teen	Top 20	Best in Activewear	
2024	Abbey Hafer	Kennebunk	14	Miss York County Teen			
2023	Jasmine Roy	Bangor	17	Miss Bangor Teen			
2022	Madisson Higgins	Bangor	15	Miss Bangor Teen			
2021	Kyah Brown	Portland	16				
2020	Grace Morey	Deer Isle	16		Top 16		
2019	Mara Carpenter	Camden	17				
2018	Erin McPherson	Hartford	16				
2017	Victoria Timm	Scarborough	17				
2016	Jessica Stewart	Unity	17				
2015	Skylar Marie Gaudette	Saco	19				
2014	Danielle Hurtubise	Portland	16				
2013	Delaney Seavey	Portland	18	Miss Saco Teen			
2012	Molly Fitzpatrick	Cumberland	16				
2011	Alexis Mcilwain	Saco	15		Top 15		
2010	Norissa Morse	Saco	17				
2009	Jordan Shiers	Gorham	16	Miss Gorham Teen			
2008	Avery Barr	Gorham	16				
2007	Amanda Pelletier	Vassalboro	18				
2006	Donna Schlieper	Scarborough	18				
2005	Kaetlin Tyne Parent	Van Buren	17				Later Miss Maine USA 2008; Current production staff member of the Miss Maine USA and Miss Maine Teen USA pageants
2004	Courtney Peterson	Yarmouth	17				
2003	Ashley Alden	Augusta	18		Top 15		
2002	Megan Jackson	Portland	16				Contestant at National Sweetheart 2004
2001	Mei-Ling Lam	Newport	17	Miss Cumberland Teen			Playboy Playmate of the Month June 2011
2000	Ashley Marble	Topsfield	16				1st runner-up at Miss Maine USA 2011, later crowned Miss Maine USA 2011 after the original winner resigned and made the final Top 8 at Miss USA 2011.
1999	Michelle Beaulieu	Madawaska	17				Originally first runner-up; assumed the title after Leigh Quintan's resignation
1999	Leigh Quintan	Portland	18		Did not compete		Resigned
1998	Krista Wakefield	Houlton	17				
1997	Crystal Carlson	Newport	17				
1996	Laura Larson	Wilton	16				
1995	Kathryn "Katie" Aselton	Milbridge	16		1st runner-up		
1994	Jennifer Lyn Hunt	Rumford	15				Later Miss Maine USA 2000
1993	Jill Mellen	Hollis	17		Top 12		
1992	Angela Walker	Benton	17	Miss Benton Teen			
1991	Keri Mowenowski	Gardiner	18	Miss Scarborough Teen			Later Miss Maine USA 1995
1990	Michelle Grenier	Bangor	16	Miss Bangor Teen			
1989	Lisa Bailey	Portland	17				
1988	Christine Despres	Biddeford	17				
1987	Donna Renee Stevenson	Bangor	17	Miss Bangor Teen			
1986	Linda Marie Kiene	Scarborough	16				Later Miss Maine USA 1992
1985	Tracy Lynn Smith	Old Town	15				
1984	Beth Maxwell	Portland	17				
1983	Dina Louise Duval	Auburn	17				

^{1} Age at the time of the Miss Teen USA pageant
