= Sally Ann Freedman =

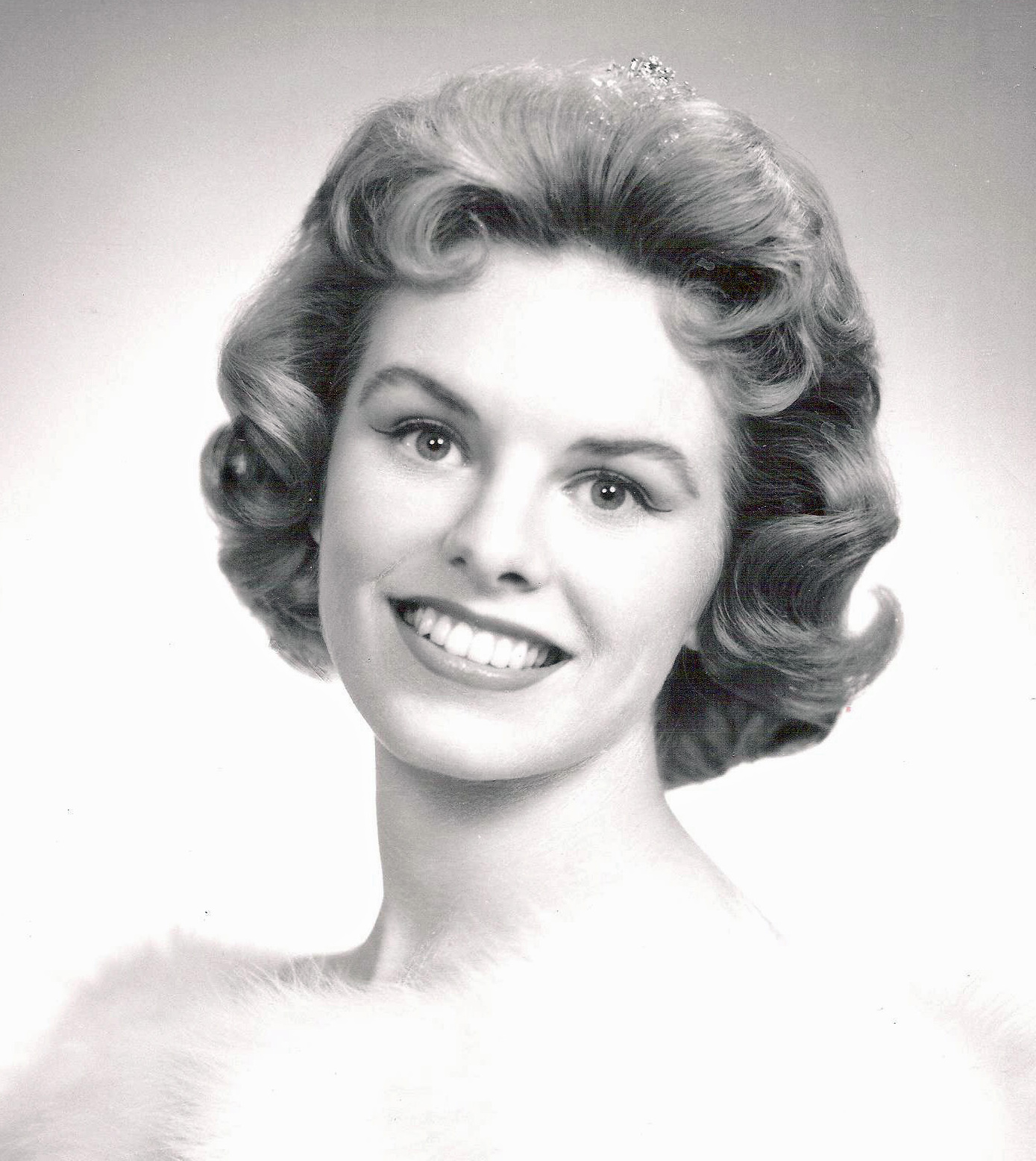
- Freedman in 1961
- Born: May 1, 1940; Salem, Massachusetts, U.S.
- Died: September 9, 2015 (aged 75); Danvers, Massachusetts
- Education: Merrimack College (Bachelor's); Salem State College (Master's)
- Occupations: Educator, musician, musician, model, beauty queen
- Beauty pageant titleholder
- Title: Miss Massachusetts USA (1958)
- Years active: 1955–1961
- Major competition: Miss Universe (1958)

Sally Ann Freedman (May 1, 1940 – September 9, 2015) was a former beauty queen, professional model, band vocalist, and educator. As Miss Massachusetts USA, she competed in the Miss Universe contest held in Long Beach, California in 1958. Her previous titles included Miss Essex County 1955, Miss Sea Nymph 1956, Miss Hampton Beach 1957, and Miss New England Ballroom 1958. In 1961, she was the talent winner and one of the five finalists in the Miss Sun Fun USA pageant held in Myrtle Beach, South Carolina.

== Early life ==
During her early years, Freedman trained as a dancer at the Alice P. Duffee Dance Studio in Salem, Massachusetts. With the school's professional troupe she performed for several years throughout the North Shore. After graduating from the Academie Moderne in Boston, a finishing school founded by Mildred Albert, she began a modeling career. She joined the Hart Model Agency in Boston and worked as a fashion and photography model throughout college.

Her career as a vocalist carried her throughout New England. She sang with orchestras led by Bob Batchelder, Ted Herbert, and Earle Harris. They played at popular ballrooms of the day including the Totem Pole Ballroom in Norumbega Park, Auburndale; Commodore Ballroom in Lowell, Massachusetts; Carousel Ballroom in Manchester, New Hampshire; Rockingham Ballroom in Newmarket, New Hampshire; Canobie Lake Ballroom in Salem, New Hampshire; and Hampton Beach Casino Ballroom in Hampton Beach, New Hampshire. In December 1959, she performed with the Earle Harris Orchestra at the Oceanview Ballroom in Revere Beach, Massachusetts. They were the last band to play the popular establishment before it was destroyed by fire. Freedman also performed throughout the Greater Boston area with the Harry Marshard Society Orchestra.

While pursuing graduate studies in Washington, D.C., Freedman continued her singing career. With orchestras and her own small combo, the Commanders, she performed at country clubs as well as civic, military, and social galas. The venues included the Sheraton-Park, Shoreham, Statler-Hilton, and Mayflower Hotel.

== Personal life ==
Freedman was raised in Peabody, Massachusetts. Upon graduation from Peabody High School, she attended Merrimack College in North Andover, Massachusetts, majoring in sociology. She graduated magna cum laude and valedictorian and went on to pursue graduate studies in sociology for two years at The Catholic University of America in Washington, D.C. She then became a teacher and left behind her singing career. "I love music," she [told a reporter], "but when I turned to teaching I sort of found myself entering another stage of my life. Somehow, I didn't think that teaching and entertaining were compatible. By today's standards, I suppose that no one would think anything of the combination."

Freedman taught at Peabody High School, Mount Wachusett Community College in Gardner, Massachusetts, and North Shore Community College in Beverly, Massachusetts. She served as research assistant to Charles F. Westoff, Ph.D., Princeton University, and Raymond H. Potvin, Ph.D., Catholic University, for College Women and Fertility Values (1967). In 1968, she married Eugene F. Connolly, who served for many years as Professor and Professor Emeritus at Northern Essex Community College in Haverhill, Massachusetts. They settled in Danvers, Massachusetts, where they raised their four children: a son and three daughters. After earning a master's degree in Guidance and Counseling from Salem State College in 1980, she worked at North Shore Technical High School in Middleton, Massachusetts for twenty-one years as a guidance counselor. She was president of Northeast Counselors Association. Since 1994, she has served as editor of the Counselor's Notebook, the monthly publication of the Massachusetts School Counselors Association. In 2011, she was recipient of a MASCA 50th Anniversary Tribute Award.

After the death of her husband of 37 years, Freedman found solace in creating a literary scrapbook of her husband's writings. Her husband had written: "One of the peculiarities of death is that it can stop the breath, but it cannot still the voice of one we love." She captured that voice in her self-published book and helped to perpetuate his legacy. In the process, Freedman discovered a new creative outlet: writing. She continued to pen articles about health, education, and lifestyle issues, and she became a regular contributor to her community newspaper, The Danvers Herald. Her columns were syndicated nationally through Senior Wire News Service. Her books include:

- A Boy from Lawrence: The Collected Works of Eugene F. Connolly (2005)
- Never Better: All Things Considered (2007)
- Matters on My Mind: MOMM (2011)
- More on My Mind: MOMM (2012)
- More that Matters (2013)

Freedman died on September 9, 2015.
