= Shauntay Hinton =

American actress and beauty queen

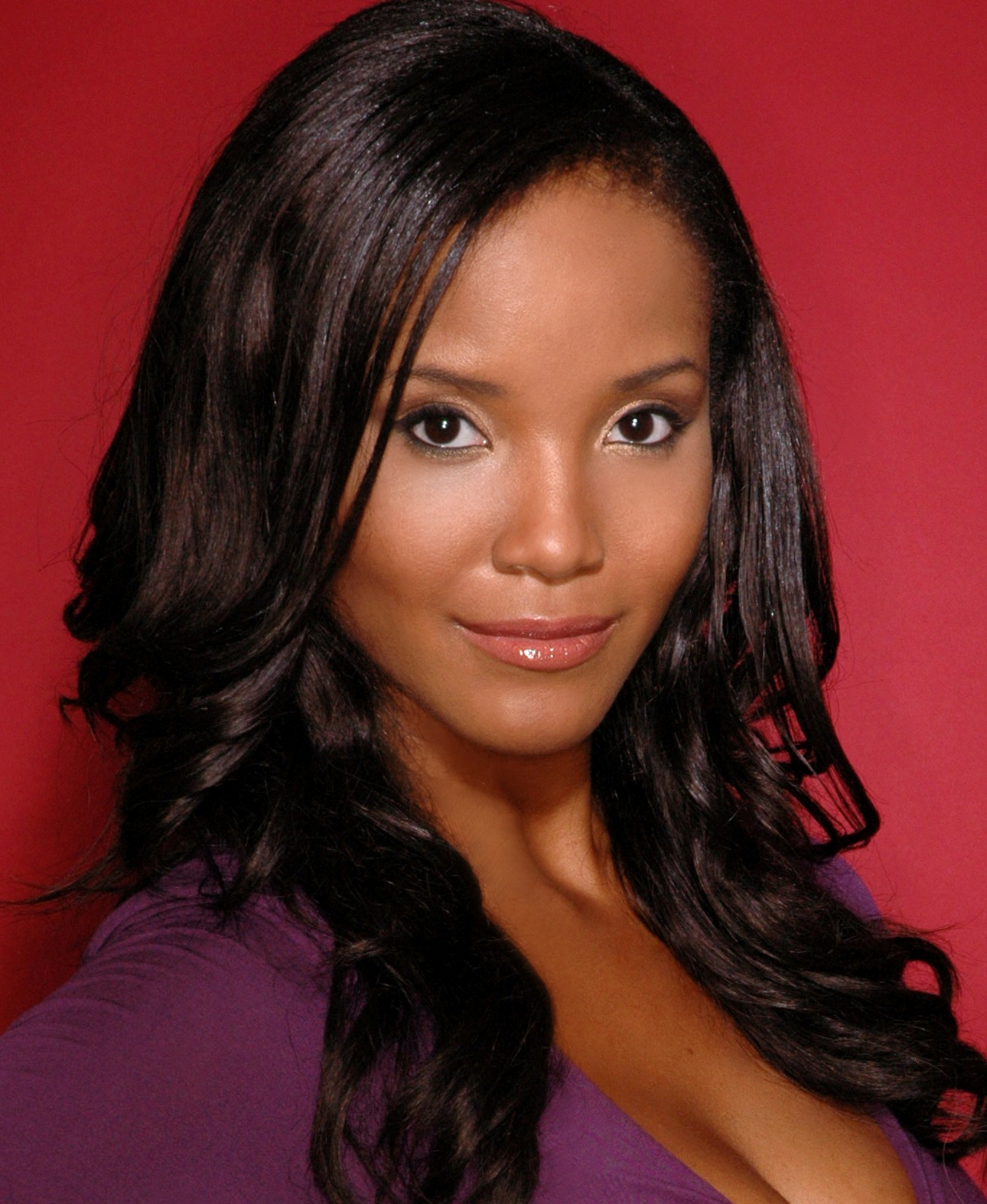
- Hinton Miss USA 2002
- Born: Starkville, Mississippi, U.S.
- Education: Howard University
- Beauty pageant titleholder
- Title: Miss District of Columbia USA 2002; Miss USA 2002
- Hair color: Brown
- Eye color: Brown
- Major competitions: Miss USA 2002 (Winner); Miss Universe 2002 (Unplaced)

Shauntay Renae Hinton is an American actress, tv host and beauty pageant titleholder who won the title of Miss USA 2002 and represented the United States at Miss Universe 2002 pageant.

== Biography ==
Born and reared in her native Starkville, Mississippi, Hinton stepped into the national spotlight as Miss USA 2002. After attending Howard University in Washington D.C., with a major in broadcast journalism, she used her communication skills along with the coveted title of Miss USA to work on behalf of charitable organizations like Susan G. Komen For The Cure, Miriam's Kitchen, Gilda's House, the USO and the Muscular Dystrophy Association. Shauntay is credited for helping to raise $34 million for all her charitable causes in 2002. A frequent guest co-anchor/panelist debating current events and pop culture on HLN network programs including PRIME NEWS and SHOWBIZ TONIGHT, Shauntay is currently an anchor for the Sunrise Morning Show for North Mississippi's local CBS news affiliate, WCBI. Her other credits include a recurring role on Nickelodeon's "iCarly" as "Jessica Warner", hosting lifestyle and entertainment programming for NBC, Fox Sports, Fox Movie Channel, Lifetime, HGTV, Twentieth Television, BET, TV One, Current TV and The History Channel. Shauntay also serves as an Ambassador for ChildFund International (aka Christian Children's Fund).

=== Education ===
Hinton graduated from Starkville High School in 1997. She later studied broadcast communications at Howard University.

=== Pageants ===
Hinton won the Miss District of Columbia USA 2002 title in November 2001, the first time she had competed in the competition. Hinton hails from Starkville, Mississippi and qualified to compete Miss District of Columbia USA as she was attending Howard University.

Hinton went on to represent the District of Columbia at the Miss USA 2002 pageant held in Gary, Indiana on 1 March 2002 where she became the fourth African American to win the Miss USA title. The pageant marked the first time that 4 out of the 5 five finalists were African American.

Hinton later competed in the Miss Universe 2002 pageant in Puerto Rico in May that year. Her national costume was a New York firefighter to commemorate the September 11 attacks. As of 2025, she is one of only five Miss USA winners not to have placed among the semi-finalists in the Miss Universe pageant. The other four are Miss USA 1976 Barbara Peterson, Miss USA 1999 Kimberly Pressler, Miss USA 2010 Rima Fakih, and Miss USA 2024 Alma Cooper.

Hinton spoke out on the Miss USA 2010 official photo controversy on Showbiz Tonight on May 5, HLN Prime News on May 10, 2010, and on several other news channels. She believes the photos are not racy, and that they represent "women comfortable in their own skin."

=== Casting ===
She plays a live action character, reporter Brittany Bhima, in the video game Command & Conquer 3: Tiberium Wars, released in 2007.

In 2009, Hinton played Jessica Warner in 2 episodes of iCarly.

== Filmography ==
Year	Title	Role	Notes
2002	The 51st Annual Miss USA Pageant	Herself-Miss District of Columbia USA	
2002	Live with Regis and Kathie Lee	Herself	1 episode
2002	The 16th Annual Soul Train Music Awards	Herself	TV
2002	Miss Universe Pageant	Herself-Miss USA	TV
2002	The Early Show	Herself	2 episodes-dated March 2 and November 25
2003	Miss USA	Herself	
2003	BET Open Mic: HIV Testing Day	Host	TV
2003	The Best Damn Sports Show Period	Guest Correspondent	2 episodes-dated December 12, 2002 and August 1
2005	Fresh Start Weekend	Herself-Host	TV
2005	Current TV	Host	unknown episodes
2005	Tears of a Clown	Tasha	
2005	Nice Guy?	Nicole	
2006	2006 Trumpet Awards	Herself - Red Carpet Host	TV
2006	Criminal Minds	Female Reporter	1 episode
2006	Cuts	Angel	1 episode
2007	World Premiere	Herself-Host	1 episode
2007	We Live Here	Herself-Host	6 episodes; 2007–2008
2007	Command & Conquer 3: Tiberium Wars	Brittany Bhima	VG
2009	Heroes	Announcer	1 episode
2009	Un-broke: What You Need To Know About Money	Reporter	TV
2009	iCarly	Jessica Warner/Reporter	2 episodes-iRock the Vote:dated February 7;iFight Shelby Marx:dated August 8

Awards and achievements
Preceded by Kandace Krueger	Miss USA; 2002	Succeeded by Susie Castillo
Preceded by Liane Angus	Miss District of Columbia USA; 2002	Succeeded by Michelle Dollie Wright
