= School Pride =

- Genre: Reality; Documentary
- Created by: Cheryl Hines
- Starring: Susie Castillo; Jacob Soboroff; Tom Stroup; Kym Whitley
- Country of origin: United States
- Original language: English
- No. of seasons: 1
- No. of episodes: 7

Production
- Executive producers: Cheryl Hines; Denise Cramsey
- Running time: 44 minutes
- Production company: Warner Horizon Television

Original release
- Network: NBC
- Release: October 15 – November 26, 2010

School Pride is an American reality television series that aired on NBC, from executive producers Cheryl Hines and Denise Cramsey. The seven-episode series, which follows the renovation of a different public school each week, aired from October 15 to November 26, 2010. The premiere episode earned 2.90 million viewers.

== Premise ==
Each week, cameras follow teachers, students and community members as they perform renovations on an ailing school, which will occur over a seven-day period (ten days for the first episode). A group of community organizers and personalities serve to motivate the volunteers and lead the community through the makeover process. Cameras will revisit the school a few months after the renovation to see how the community has been affected by the changes.

== Main cast ==
- Jacob Soboroff, political correspondent
- Kym Whitley, comedian and former substitute teacher
- Susie Castillo, actress and Miss USA 2003
- Tom Stroup, SWAT Commander

== Development and production ==
The series was based on the successful rehabilitation of Carver Elementary in Compton, California several years ago, in which a community came together to restore the dilapidated school. Executive producer Cheryl Hines volunteered during the renovation. Afterward, there were positive and lasting effects on the community, with an increase in property value and test scores. Hines felt this would be a good subject for a reality show. She teamed up with Denise Cramsey, a former executive producer on Extreme Makeover: Home Edition, and pitched the idea to NBC.

In January 2010, NBC announced a two-hour special was in the works for Fall 2010. Enterprise Middle School in Compton, California was renovated over 10 days during the school's spring break. The special served as a backdoor pilot, and NBC green-lighted a series in mid-May. The additional episodes were filmed during renovations of the schools over July and August 2010.

Each school received approximately $2 million in upgrades and repairs.

On November 23, 2010, Denise Cramsey died of a brain aneurysm at age 41. The episode that aired on November 26, 2010 (featuring Los Angeles Center for Enriched Studies) was dedicated to her memory and was "expected to be the series finale".

== Schools ==
Enterprise Middle School in Compton, California

- Renovated from March 31 to April 12, 2010

Los Angeles Center for Enriched Studies (LACES) in Los Angeles, California

- Renovated in early July, although the Los Angeles Unified School District initially turned down the renovation invitation.

Lanier Elementary in Baton Rouge, Louisiana

- Renovated from July 12 to 18

Kingston Springs Elementary in Kingston Springs, Tennessee

- Renovated from July 22 – 28, the school was destroyed by flood waters in early May 2010, cutting short the school year.

Communication & Media Arts High School in Detroit, Michigan

- Renovated from August 1 to 7, the school was slated for closure prior to becoming a finalist for a School Pride renovation.

Needles High School in Needles, California

- Renovated from August 13 to 19

Hollenbeck Middle School in Los Angeles, California

- Renovated August 22 to 28

== Criticism ==
An article written by L.A. Times writer Steve Lopez discusses the initial hesitance of the Los Angeles Unified School District in allowing two of its schools (Los Angeles Center for Enriched Studies (LACES) & Hollenbeck Middle School) participate in the show. District officials expressed concerns regarding the quality of work performed and products donated, the costs of repairs and maintenance of the renovations, granting 24-hr access to the schools, and the negative publicity that might be incurred by their involvement with the show. Eventually, LAUSD agreed to the makeovers. After the work was completed, criticism regarding "shoddy work" at Hollenbeck and a "reenacted [scene] that didn't happen" at LACES was cited as some validation for the district's reluctance. Some school district officials noted that LAUSD spent approximately $106,000 in associated costs as a result, but the value of the donations made by the show's corporate sponsors was not stated.

Los Angeles Times television critic Mary McNamara noted that like most reality shows, the program "attempts to create narrative tension where there is none", but thought this wasn't important in this case because the point of the show was "not about the process or even the payoff, it's about the need" for help at many more schools. A Washington Post critic questioned the show's authenticity, arguing that School Pride appeared to be scripted or too contrived.
