= Susie Castillo =

MTV VJ, Miss USA 2003

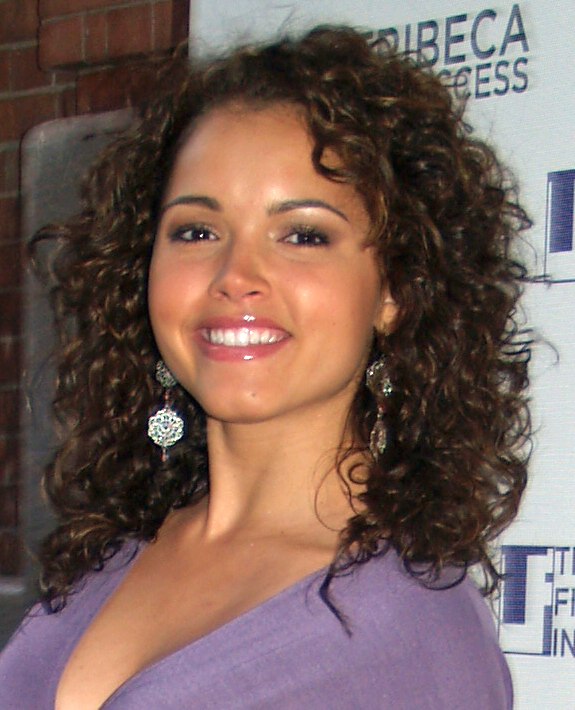
- Castillo in 2007
- Born: October 27, 1979 (age 46); Methuen, Massachusetts, U.S.
- Occupations: Actress, model
- Height: 5 ft 8 in (1.73 m)
- Spouse: Matthew Leslie (m. 2006)
- Beauty pageant titleholder
- Title: Miss Massachusetts Teen USA 1998; Miss Massachusetts USA 2003; Miss USA 2003
- Years active: 1996–present
- Hair color: Brown
- Eye color: Brown
- Major competitions: Miss Massachusetts Teen USA 1998; (Winner); Miss Teen USA 1998; (Unplaced); Miss Massachusetts USA 2003; (Winner); Miss USA 2003; (Winner); Miss Universe 2003; (Top 15)
- Website: www.susiecastillo.com

Susie Castillo (born October 27, 1979) is an American actress, TV host, model, and beauty pageant titleholder who won Miss USA 2003. She competed in the Miss Teen USA and Miss Universe pageants. She pursued a career in the media, making various television appearances and hosting shows such as MTV's Total Request Live as a VJ. She is known for portraying Principal Ramirez in the Nickelodeon live-action television series The Really Loud House (2022–present).

== Early years ==
Castillo was born in Methuen, Massachusetts, to a Dominican father and a Puerto Rican mother who were divorced when she was a child. After her father abandoned the family, her mother moved to Lawrence, Massachusetts and worked several jobs to defray her family's living and educational expenses. She was greatly influenced by her Puerto Rican heritage, though she has stated she considers herself both Puerto Rican and Dominican.

By 1996, at 16, Castillo had already become a professional model appearing in many teen magazines and commercials. Upon graduating from Methuen High School, she enrolled at Endicott College, and in 2001 earned a bachelor's degree in Interior Architecture and Design. She received the Capstone Award in recognition of her senior thesis. She is a member of Kappa Delta sorority.

== Pageantry ==
=== Miss Massachusetts Teen USA ===
Castillo won her first pageant title in November 1997, beating over 40 other contestants to become Miss Massachusetts Teen USA 1998. Castillo's sister titleholder, Miss Massachusetts USA 1998 Shawnae Jebbia went on to win the Miss USA title in February the following year.

Castillo represented her state in the Miss Teen USA pageant held in Shreveport, Louisiana on August 17, 1998. Although the pageant was usually broadcast live, that year's telecast was delayed due to a speech by then-President Bill Clinton regarding his relationship with Monica Lewinsky. She also won the Clairol Herbal Essence Award that year. The pageant was won by Vanessa Minnillo of South Carolina.

=== Miss Massachusetts USA and Miss USA ===
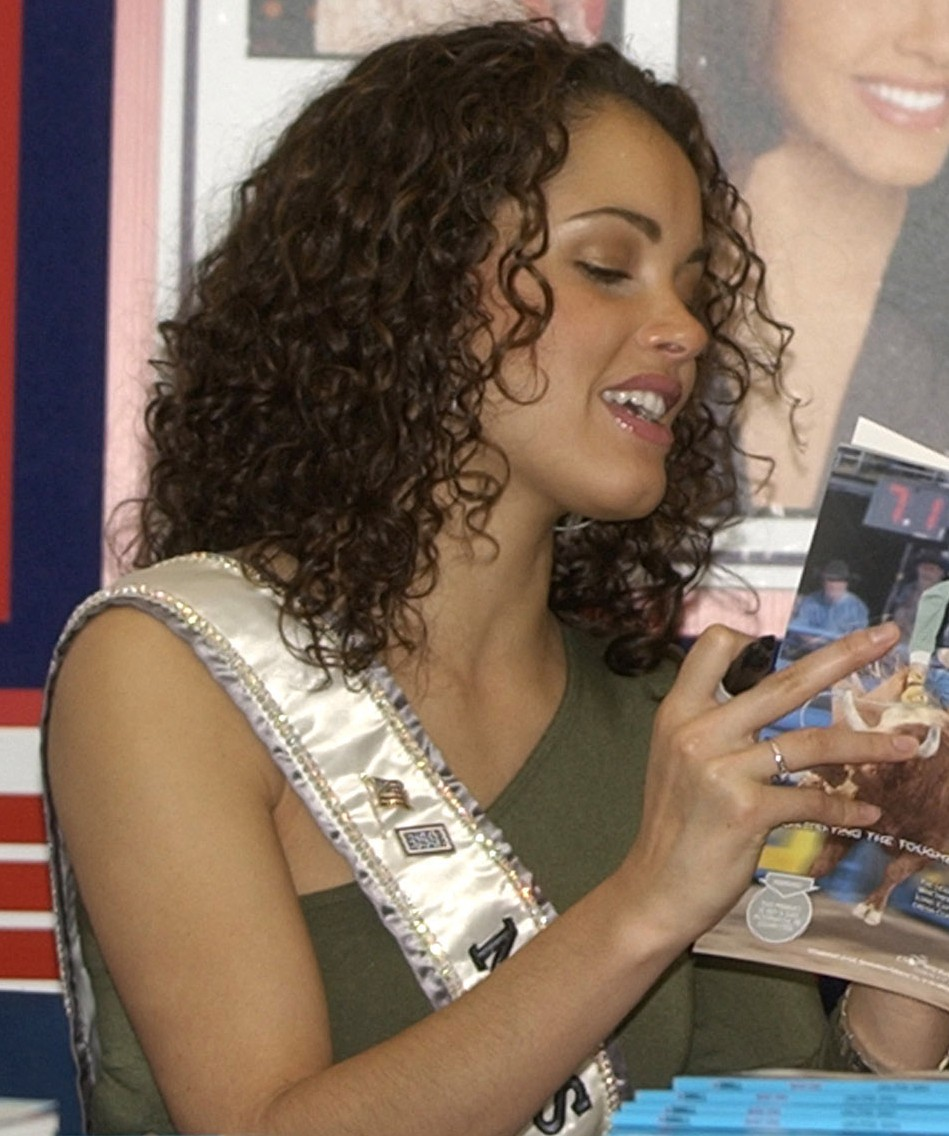
Castillo in 2004

In November 2002, Castillo participated in the Miss Massachusetts USA Pageant held at Bridgewater State College in the town of Bridgewater, and won the title. Castillo was the state's first Latina titleholder. She went on to compete in the Miss USA 2003 pageant held in San Antonio on March 24, 2003. Castillo won the Miss USA title in the nationally televised event, becoming Massachusetts' second titleholder, and the fourth former Miss Teen USA state titleholder to win the pageant. She was the third Hispanic to win Miss USA after Laura Harring in 1985 and Lynnette Cole in 2000. In addition, she was the first woman with Dominican ancestry to win the title and the second woman with Puerto Rican ancestry to win after Lynnette Cole.

As Miss USA, Castillo represented the Miss Universe Organization, making appearances for charities throughout the United States. Her "sister" 2003 titleholders were Amelia Vega (Miss Universe, of the Dominican Republic) and Tami Farrell (Miss Teen USA, of Oregon).

=== Miss Universe ===
Castillo traveled to Panama City, Panama, to compete in the Miss Universe 2003 pageant in May. Her national costume was Wonder Woman. Castillo placed among the 15 semifinalists. She placed 13th overall, like her placement at Miss Teen USA. The pageant was won by Amelia Vega of the Dominican Republic. Contrary to popular belief, it was not the first time that two Dominican women or two Puerto Rican women participated in the pageant's history because the contestants that represented Italy (Denny Mendez) and the Dominican Republic in the 1997 edition were both of Dominican ancestry and the contestants that represented USA (Lynnette Cole) and Puerto Rico in the 2000 edition were both of Puerto Rican ancestry.

== Film and television ==
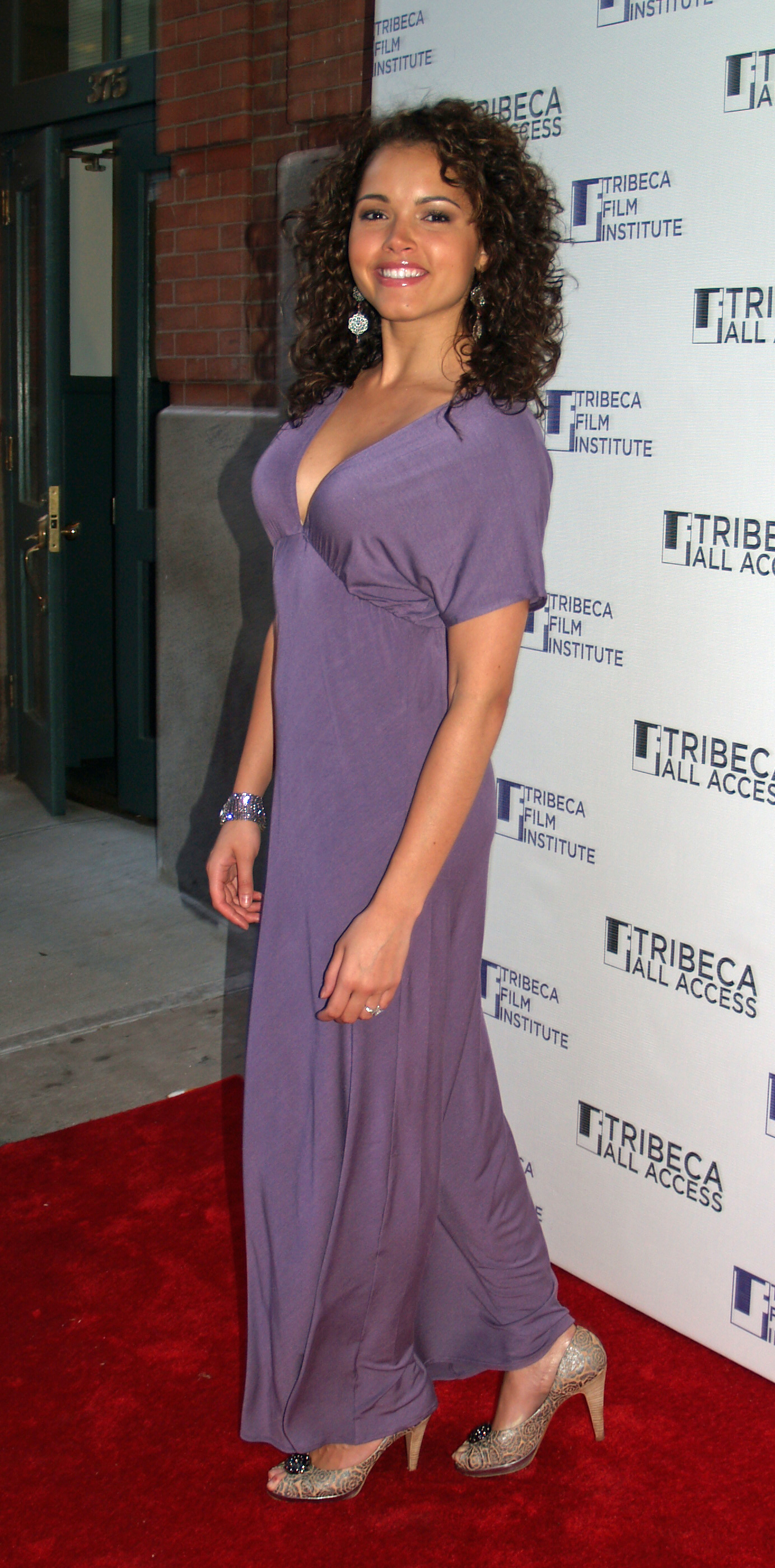
Castillo at the 2007 Tribeca Film Festival

Castillo has made guest appearances on the following shows: On-Air with Ryan Seacrest (April 5, 2004), My Wife and Kids (October 5, 2004), where she was cast as Sharon, Half & Half (October 18, 2004) cast as Shaunie. In August 2005, Castillo co-hosted the Miss Teen USA 2005 pageant alongside Passions actor Galen Gering. The event was won by Allie LaForce of Ohio.

Castillo worked as a MTV VJ and host of TRL and helped launch Mi TRL on MTV Tr3s in September 2006. She also played the role of Mercedes Hernandez in the TBS show Tyler Perry's House of Payne in a select number of episodes in season 5.

In 2008, Castillo hosted the ABC Family reality television series, America's Prom Queen. With Michael Flatley, she is the co-host of the NBC dance-competition series Superstars of Dance in 2009. Castillo co-hosted the 2008 Arthur Ashe Kids' Day on August 23 at the USTA Billie Jean King National Tennis Canter in New York City. Nickelodeon's Quddus was Susie's co-host.

Castillo was a host of the school renovation reality series School Pride, which aired on NBC in 2010. She also appeared in the 2011 film A Holiday Engagement. In 2023, Castillo portrayed Principal Ramirez in The Really Loud House.

== Modeling ==
In 2007, Castillo became a spokeswoman for Neutrogena. Castillo's work for Neutrogena includes serving as the "virtual host" of the company's promotional web site, The Big Blush. She also signed on as the brand ambassador for Charlotte Russe (retailer) and Gossip Girl stylist, Eric Daman, who is going to help her design her own line influenced by her Latino heritage. In 2013, Castillo began appearing as 'Becky', a hand model, in Palmolive's Soft Touch dish soap commercials.

== Personal life ==
On October 7, 2006, Castillo married Matthew Leslie in a quiet ceremony in Ipswich, Massachusetts. The two met shortly after Castillo won Miss Massachusetts Teen USA, Leslie proposed to Castillo during an appearance on the talk show On-Air With Ryan Seacrest in April 2004, just prior to Castillo passing on her crown during the Miss USA 2004 pageant. During her spare time Castillo does volunteer work for HAWC (Help for Abused Women and Children), the Lawrence Girls Club and for the Latinas Against Sexual Assault.

On April 27, 2011, Castillo issued a statement attacking the U.S. Transportation Security Administration (TSA), alleging that she had been groped and touched inappropriately four times during the enhanced pat-down. She released a blog post and video describing the experience, and created an online petition demanding an end to the "enhanced" pat-downs.

Castillo is a vegan and posed nude for a PETA anti-fur campaign, stating that she had always loved animals. Castillo urges the beauty pageant industry to stop awarding fur coats as prizes while exposing animals to unnecessary torture "in the name of fashion".

She was diagnosed with endometriosis; Castillo later discovered that her anti-Müllerian hormone levels had plummeted as a result of the procedure; Doctors informed her she had a 16% chance of conceiving even with in vitro fertilization.

== Filmography ==
=== As actress ===
Film and television
Year	Title	Role	Notes
2004	My Wife and Kids	Sharon	Episode: "Class Reunion"
2004	Half & Half	Shaunie	Episode: "The Big Don't Leave Me This Way Episode"
2007	Underdog	Diana Flores	Film
2008–2009	House of Payne	Mercedes Hernandez	11 episodes
2011	Castle	Nadine Espinoza	Episode: "Heartbreak Hotel"
2011	Holiday Engagement	Lindsay	Television film
2011	The Heartbreaker	Linda	Film
2012	More Than Stars	Iris	Film
2012	Hollywood Jack	Gloria	Short film
2014	Electric Slide	Robin	Film
2015	Kidnapped: The Hannah Anderson Story	Colleen Ryan	Television film
2018	Summer of 84	Brenda Woodworth	Film
2020	Long Lost Sister	Tina	Film
2020	The Tribe Murders	Sadie	Short film
2022	Paloma's Flight	Rita Moses	Television film
2023	The Really Loud House	Principal Ramirez	Episode: "Better Together"

=== As herself ===
Year	Title	Role	Notes
2003	Miss USA 2003	Herself	Television special; Competing as Miss Massachusetts USA and crowned Miss USA 2003
2003	Miss Universe	Herself	Television special; Competing as Miss USA and placed in the Top 15
2004	The Swan	Judge	Episodes: "The Swan Pageant: Part 1" and "The Swan Pageant: Part 2"
2004	101 Most Unforgettable SNL Moments	Commentator	Television special
2005	MTV Spring Break: Cancun 2005	Host	Television special
2005	Miss Teen USA 2005	Host	Television special
2005–2006	Total Request Live	Host	17 episodes
2006	Underworld: Evolution - Inside the Action	Host	Television film
2006	Your Movie Show	Host	Episode: "Gridiron Gang"
2006	Laguna Beach: The Real Orange County	Host	Episode: "Live After Party"
2006–2007	The Challenge	Host	3 episodes
2006–2007	The Real World	Host	Episodes: "Fun, Sun and Now Totally Done: The Real World Key West Reunion" and "Welcome to the Mile High Club: The Real World Denver Reunion"
2007	MTV Goes Gold: New Year's Eve 2007	Host	Television special
2007	Road Rules	Host	Episode: "Road Rules 2007 Viewers' Revenge Launch Special"
2007	Ghost Rider: Inside the Action	Host	Television film
2008	The Real World Awards Bash	Host	Television special
2008	America's Prom Queen	Host	6 episodes
2008	Arthur Ashe Kids' Day 2008	Host	Television special
2009	Superstars of Dance	Co-host	5 episodes
2010	School Pride	Co-host	7 episodes
2014–2015	Entertainment Tonight	Herself / Correspondent	3 episodes
2017	Zee Made in America	Expert	Episode: "Episode #1.10"
2017	National Puerto Rican Day Parade	Host	Television special

== See also ==
- List of Puerto Ricans
- List of people from the Dominican Republic

Awards and achievements
Preceded by Shauntay Hinton	Miss USA; 2003	Succeeded by Shandi Finnessey
Preceded by Latoyia Foster	Miss Massachusetts USA; 2003	Succeeded by Maria Lekkakos
Preceded by Jessica Gregory	Miss Massachusetts Teen USA; 1998	Succeeded by Jill Donahue
