= Shawnae Jebbia =

American entertainer and beauty pageant titleholder

- Born: Shawnae Nicole Jebbia; September 13, 1971 (age 55); Santa Rosa, California, U.S.
- Beauty pageant titleholder
- Title: Miss Massachusetts USA 1998; Miss USA 1998
- Major competitions: Miss Massachusetts USA 1998 (Winner); Miss USA 1998; (Winner); Miss Universe 1998; (Top 5)

Shawnae Nicole Jebbia (born September 13, 1971) is an American entertainer and beauty pageant titleholder who won Miss USA 1998. As Miss USA, she represented the United States at Miss Universe 1998, where she was placed in the Top 5.

Jebbia won the Miss Massachusetts USA title in 1997, in her first attempt at a pageant title. She went on to represent Massachusetts in the Miss USA 1998 pageant, becoming that state's first Miss USA winner. While Jebbia had little prior experience, her first runner-up Shauna Gambill had previously held the Miss Teen USA 1994 title. Jebbia's "sister" titleholder, Miss Massachusetts Teen USA 1998 Susie Castillo, went on to hold the Miss Massachusetts USA title and became Massachusetts' second Miss USA titleholder in 2003.

Jebbia then competed at the Miss Universe 1998 pageant later that year. Her national costume was the Statue of Liberty. High scores in evening gown and in the swimsuit competition advanced her to the final 5 but after the interview round she did not make the final 3 finalists. The winner was Wendy Fitzwilliam of Trinidad and Tobago, with whom Jebbia lived and made appearances during her reign.

Jebbia grew up in Sonoma County, California, and lived in Sebastopol for six years. She received a degree in communications from Jacksonville University and graduated cum laude on an athletic scholarship. She has appeared on television and film, including being a "Barker Beauty" on The Price Is Right from 2002 until 2003 and a stint on the ESPN2 exercise program Co-ed Training prior to winning Miss USA. After experiencing hearing loss caused by Ménière's disease, Jebbia moved out of the entertainment industry and is currently studying towards a master's degree in nursing. She has acted as the spokesperson for the Siemens Pure 700 hearing aid.

Awards and achievements
Preceded by (Curaçao) Verna Vasquez	Miss Universe third Runner-Up; 1998	Succeeded by (South Africa) Sonia Raciti
Preceded by Brandi Sherwood	Miss USA; 1998	Succeeded by Kimberly Pressler
Preceded by Jennifer K. Chapman	Miss Massachusetts USA; 1998	Succeeded by Jennifer Krafve
