= Miss Massachusetts USA =

Beauty pageant competition

- Formation: 1952
- Type: Beauty pageant
- Headquarters: Malden
- Location: Massachusetts
- Members: Miss USA
- Official language: English
- Key people: Laurie Clemente; Anthony Clemente
- Website: Official website

The Miss Massachusetts USA competition is the pageant that selects the representative for the state of Massachusetts in the Miss USA pageant. It is currently produced by The Clemente Organization based in Malden, Massachusetts, which also produces the Maine pageant.

Shawnae Jebbia was crowned Miss USA in 1998 and Susie Castillo won the crown in 2003. Both Miss USA winners from Massachusetts were asked the same final question during the live telecasts. The most recent placement was Melissa Sapini in 2024, placing Top 10.

Kayshauna Montaño of West Springfield was crowned Miss Massachusetts USA 2026 on June 21, 2026 at DoubleTree by Hilton Hotel Boston North Shore in Danvers. She will represent Massachusetts at the Miss USA 2026 pageant.

== Gallery of titleholders ==
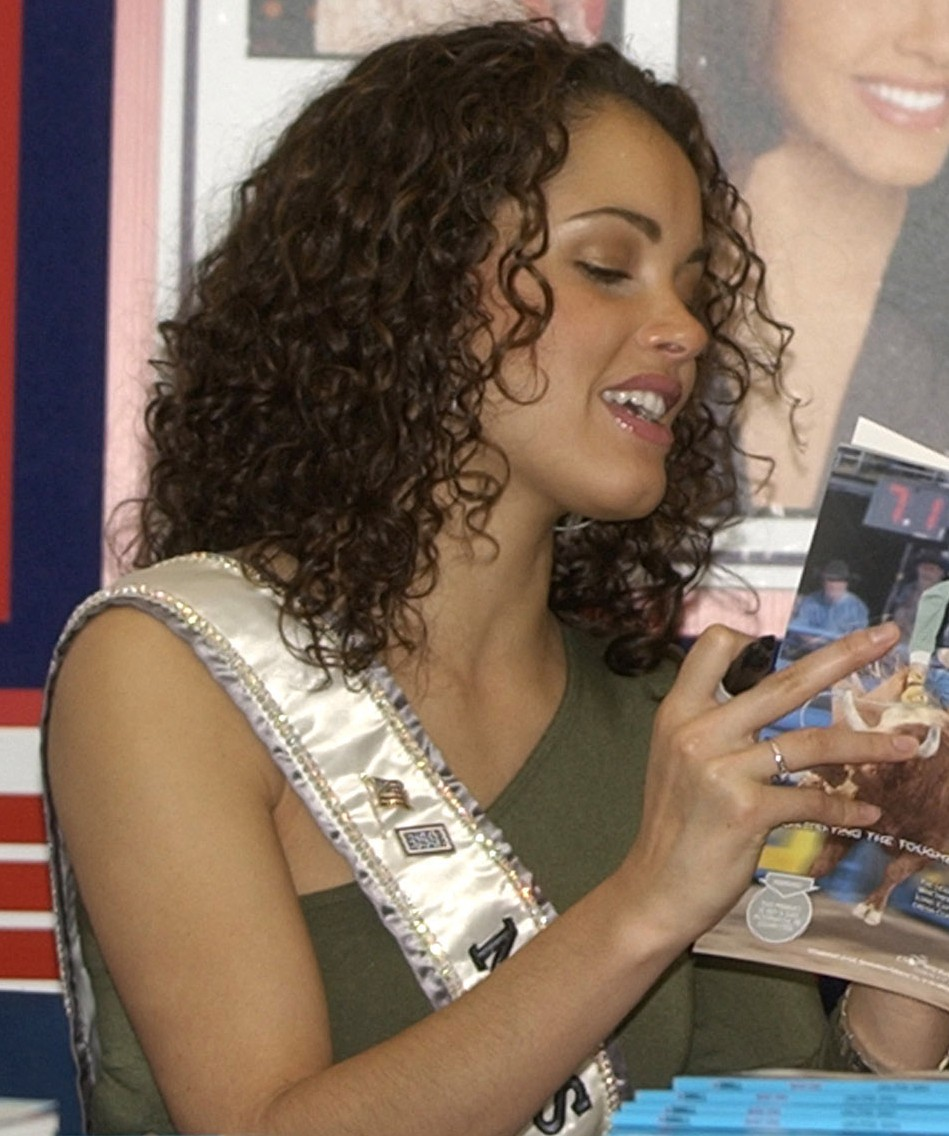
Susie Castillo, Miss Massachusetts USA and Miss USA 2003

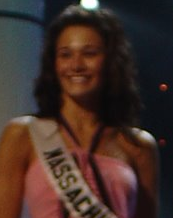
Maria Lekkakos, Miss Massachusetts USA 2004

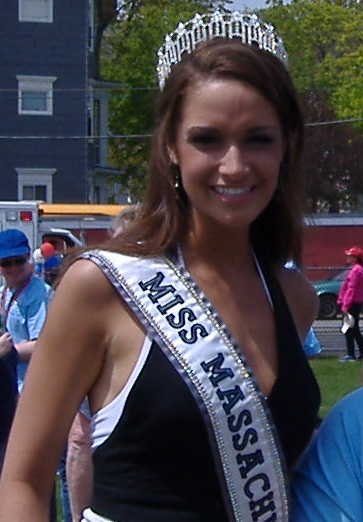
Tiffany Kelly, Miss Massachusetts USA 2006

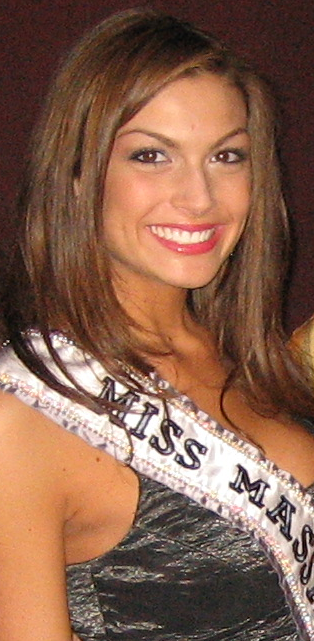
Jackie Bruno, Miss Massachusetts USA 2008

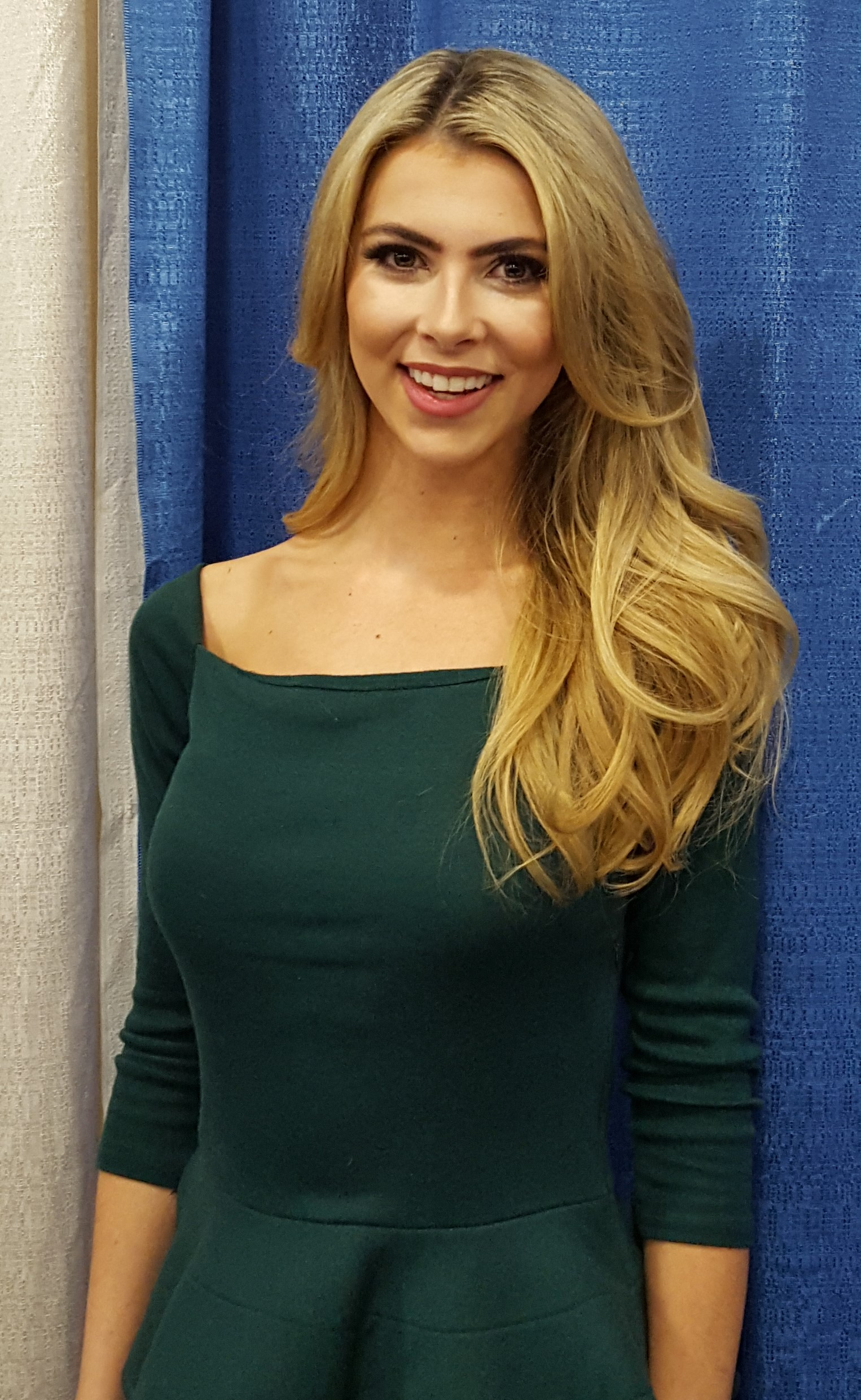
Whitney Sharpe, Miss Massachusetts USA 2016

== Results summary ==
- Miss USAs: Shawnae Jebbia (1998), Susie Castillo (2003)
- 1st runner-up: Diane Pollard (1978)
- Top 10/12: Monica Magnus (1979), Janet Marie Flaherty (1982), Mercedes Waggoner (1985), Kristen Mastroianni (1995), Jacqueline Bruno (2008), Melissa Sapini (2024)
- Top 15: Sandra Ramsey (1957), Barbara Feldman (1960), Elaine Cusick (1961), Sandra Smith (1963), Nancy Brackett (1966), Sarah Kidd (2013), Allissa Latham (2018)
- Massachusetts holds a record of 16 placements at Miss USA.

=== Awards ===
- Miss Photogenic: Annika Sharma (2023), Melissa Sapini (2024)
- Miss Congeniality: Stacey Blaine (1993)
- Best State Costume: JoAnne Savery (1981)

== Winners ==
Color key

- Declared as Winner
- Ended as runner-up
- Ended as one of the finalists or semifinalists

| Year | Name | Hometown | Age^{1} | Local title | Placement at Miss USA | Special awards at Miss USA | Notes |
|---|---|---|---|---|---|---|---|
| 2026 | Kayshauna Montaño | West Springfield | 28 | Miss Hampshire County | | | |
| 2025 | Perianne Caron | Boston | 26 | Miss West End | | | |
| 2024 | Melissa Sapini | North Attleborough | 21 | Miss North Attleborough | Top 10 | Miss Photogenic | Later Miss Universe Haiti 2025. |
| 2023 | Annika Sharma | Newton | 22 | Miss Commonwealth | | Miss Photogenic | Previously Miss Massachusetts Teen USA 2020 |
| 2022 | Skarlet Ramirez | Lawrence | 27 | Miss Lawrence | | | Born in the Dominican Republic |
| 2021 | Sarah DeSouza | Dracut | 25 | | | | |
| 2020 | Sabrina Victor | Brockton | 23 | | | | |
| 2019 | Kelly O'Grady | Cambridge | 27 | | | | Later became correspondent for Fox Business |
| 2018 | Allissa Latham | Lowell | 26 | | Top 15 | | |
| 2017 | Julia Scaparotti | Peabody | 24 | | | | New England Patriots Cheerleader |
| 2016 | Whitney Sharpe | Burlington | 21 | | | | |
| 2015 | Polikseni Manxhari | Boston | 24 | | | | Born in Albania |
| 2014 | Caroline Lunny | Holliston | 22 | | | | Previously Miss Massachusetts Teen USA 2008; Top 15 at Miss Teen USA 2008.; Contestant on The Bachelor (season 22), Bachelor in Paradise (season 5) and Bachelor in Paradise Australia (season 2) |
| 2013 | Sarah Kidd | Leominster | 20 | | Top 15 | | |
| 2012 | Natalie Pietrzak | Somerville | 25 | | | | Sister of Monica Pietrzak, Miss Connecticut USA 2009 and Miss USA 2009 semifinalist |
| 2011 | Alida D'Angona | Bolton | 23 | | | | |
| 2010 | Lacey Wilson | Boston | 26 | | | | Previously Miss Illinois Teen USA 2002 |
| 2009 | Alison Michele Cronin | East Weymouth | 21 | | | | Previously Miss Massachusetts Teen USA 2005 |
| 2008 | Jackie Bruno | Assonet | 23 | | Top 10, finishing in 10th place | | Previously Miss Massachusetts Teen USA 2003; 3rd runner-up at Miss Teen USA 2003 |
| 2007 | Despina Delios | Lynn | 23 | | | | |
| 2006 | Tiffany Kelly | Braintree | 18 | | | | |
| 2005 | Cristina Nardozzi | Seekonk | 21 | | | | Was contestant on Fear Factor in 2005 on the Miss USA episode #5.29 |
| 2004 | Maria Lekkakos | Rockport | 25 | | | | |
| 2003 | Susie Castillo | Lawrence | 23 | | Miss USA 2003 | | Top 15 semifinalist at Miss Universe 2003; Previously Miss Massachusetts Teen USA 1998 |
| 2002 | Latoyia Cimone Foster | Lowell | | | | | |
| 2001 | Dana Tenille Powell | Brookline | | | | | |
| 2000 | Rosalie M. Allain | Leominster | | | | | Later Mrs. Massachusetts America 2009 under her married name, Rosalie Allain-Morris. |
| 1999 | Jennifer Krafve | Saugus | | | | | Mother of Avery Turner, Miss Massachusetts Teen USA 2024 |
| 1998 | Shawnae Jebbia | Mansfield | 26 | | Miss USA 1998 | | Top 5 Finalist at Miss Universe 1998 |
| 1997 | Jennifer K. Chapman | Maynard | 24 | | | | |
| 1996 | Jacquelyn Doucette | Lynnfield | 26 | | | | Mother of Jillian Driscoll, Miss Massachusetts Teen USA 2022 |
| 1995 | Kristen Mastroianni | Wilbraham | 23 | | Semi-finalist, finishing in 10th place | | Previously Miss Massachusetts Teen USA 1987; Top 10 at Miss Teen USA 1987 |
| 1994 | Michelle Atamian | Belmont | | | | | |
| 1993 | Stacey Blaine | Bellingham | | Miss Bellingham | | Miss Congeniality | |
| 1992 | Christine Netishen | Lowell | | | | | |
| 1991 | Laura Wheeler | Framingham | | | | | |
| 1990 | Laureen Murphy | Boston | | | | | |
| 1989 | Kimberley Wallace | Ipswich | | | | | |
| 1988 | Anita Marie Lovely | Franklin | | | | | |
| 1987 | Rosanna Iversen | Great Barrington | | | | | Represented Massachusetts in Miss Oktoberfest 1987 |
| 1986 | Sheila Benson | Quincy | | | | | |
| 1985 | Mercedes Waggoner | Boston | 21 | | Semi-finalist, finishing in 8th place | | |
| 1984 | Deborah Neary | Onset | | | | | |
| 1983 | Robin Jeanne Silva | Swansea | | | | | |
| 1982 | Janet Marie Flaherty | Wilmington | 24 | | Semi-finalist | | |
| 1981 | JoAnne Savery | East Bridgewater | | Miss East Bridgewater | | Best State Costume | |
| 1980 | Diane Campbell | Melrose | | Miss Melrose | | | |
| 1979 | Monica Patricia Magnus | Boston | 24 | | Semi-finalist | | |
| 1978 | Diane Elizabeth Pollard | Hamilton | 20 | | 1st runner-up | | |
| 1977 | Carol Marcil | Chelmsford | | | | | |
| 1976 | Holly Ann Hoyle | Attleboro | | | | | |
| 1975 | Rilla Posson | Natick | | | | | |
| 1974 | Ethellean Hicks | Roxbury | | | | | |
| 1973 | Judith "Judy" Ann Gregory | Boston | 26 | | | | |
| 1972 | Dale Carder | Wellesley | | | | | |
| 1971 | April Dow | Amesbury | | | | | |
| 1970 | Cheryl Stankiewicz | Brockton | | | | | Represented Massachusetts in the Miss World USA 1967 pageant |
| 1969 | Martha Cawley | Needham | | | | | |
| 1968 | Sonja Fritz | Boston | | | | | |
| 1967 | Pamela Procter | Marblehead | | | | | Daughter of Miss Massachusetts 1940 Polly Connors, 3rd Runner-Up to Miss America. |
| 1966 | Nancy Joan Brackett | Brighton | 20 | | Semi-finalist | | Semifinalist in Miss USA World 1963 as Miss Boston, MA |
| 1965 | Mary Lou Volpe | Braintree | | | | | |
| 1964 | Barbara Helen Robery | Boston | | | | | |
| 1963 | Sandra "Su-Su" Smith | Newton Upper Falls | 23 | | Semi-finalist | | Non-finalist at Miss World USA 1961 |
| 1962 | Gale Pope | Wellesley | | | | | |
| 1961 | Elaine Cusick | Hyde Park | 18 | | Semi-finalist | | photograph |
| 1960 | Barbara Gale Feldman | Natick | 20 | | Top 15 | | |
| 1959 | Beatrice Duprey | Weymouth | | | | | Also competed in the 1960 Miss Sun Fun USA Pageant |
| 1958 | Sally Ann Freedman | Peabody | | | | | Finalist in the 1961 Miss Sun Fun USA Pageant |
| 1957 | Sandra Ramsey | Haverhill | 19 | | Semi-finalist | | |
| 1956 | Elaine Murphy | Weston | | | | | |
| 1955 | Jean Dernago | Springfield | | | | | |
| 1954 | Nan Cowan | Sterling | | | | | |
| 1953 | Joan Daly | Somerville | | | | | |
| 1952 | Vel Dorne | Boston | | | | | |

^{1} Age at the time of the Miss USA pageant
