= Miss USA 1998 =

47th Miss USA pageant

- Date: March 10, 1998
- Presenters: J. Eddie Peck; Ali Landry; Julie Moran
- Venue: Shreveport, Louisiana
- Broadcaster: CBS, KSLA
- Winner: Shawnae Jebbia; Massachusetts
- Congeniality: Vera Morris (North Carolina)
- Photogenic: Sonja Glenn (South Carolina)

Miss USA 1998 was the 47th Miss USA pageant, held in Shreveport, Louisiana in March, 1998. The preliminary competition was held on March 6, 1998, and the final competition on March 10, 1998. The event was won by Shawnae Jebbia of Massachusetts, who was crowned by outgoing titleholder Brandi Sherwood of Idaho.

The pageant was held in Shreveport, Louisiana for the second consecutive year; unusually Shreveport would also host the Miss Teen USA pageant later the same year. Owner Donald Trump had initially suggested that the event would be moved to New York City, however an agreement was reached in November 1997 for the pageant to stay in Louisiana. During the two weeks that the delegates were in Shreveport the city and local companies benefitted from the extra business generated by the pageant and by the publicity offered by three minutes of promotion during the live broadcast. The expected worldwide audience for the pageant was 300 million people.

The pageant was hosted by The Young and the Restless star J. Eddie Peck for the only time, and Ali Landry, Miss USA 1996 and Julie Moran, co-host of Entertainment Tonight, offered colour commentary. She Moves provided entertainment during the competition. Executive producers Susan Winston and Dan Funk were chosen to produce the live telecast, broadcast on CBS.

During the competition, in a pre-taped segment, Halle Berry, Miss Ohio USA 1986 and first runner-up to Christy Fichtner at Miss USA 1986, was awarded a Distinguished Achievement Award for her achievements in acting.

== Results ==
=== Placements ===
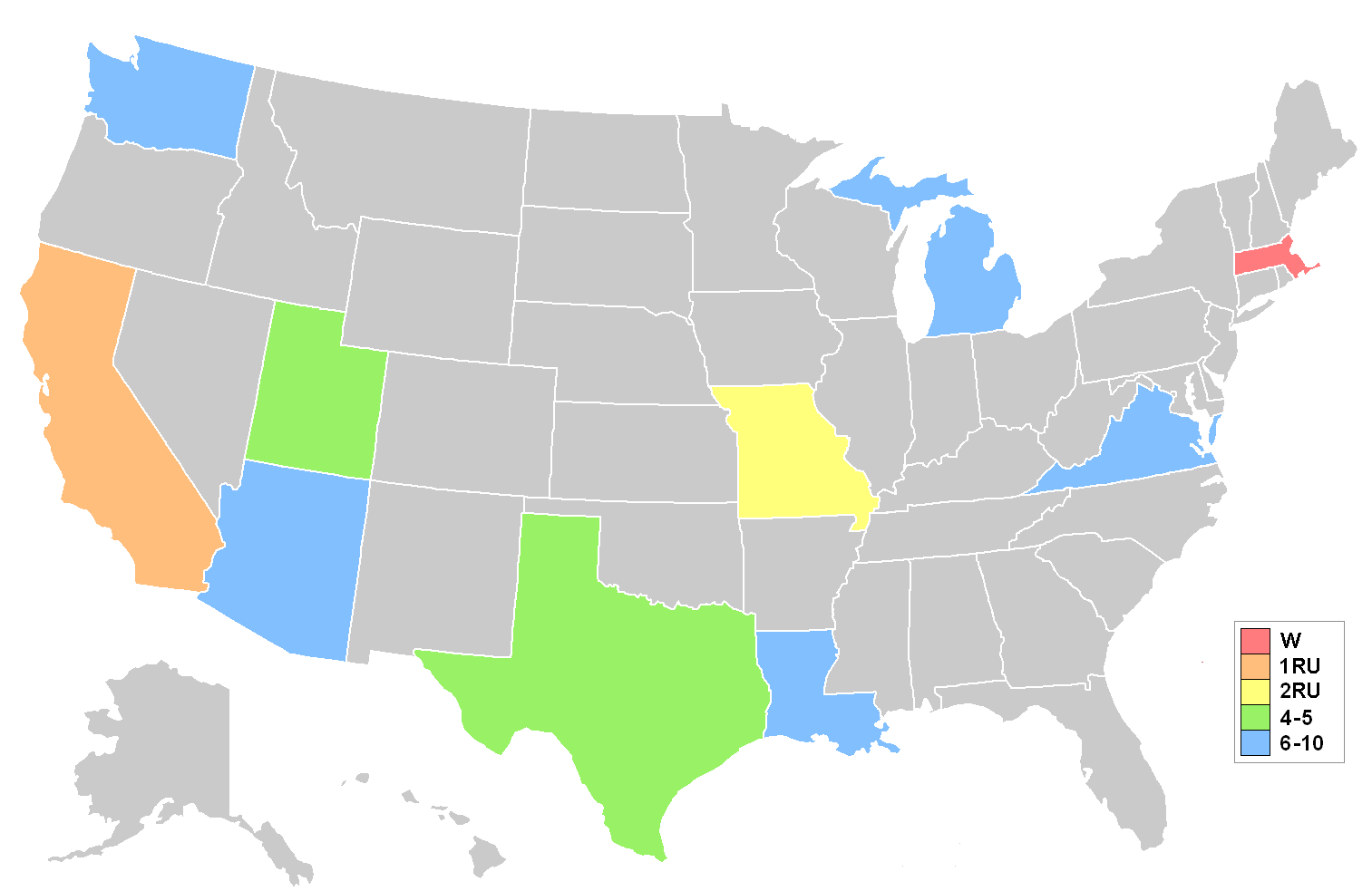
Map showing placements by state

Final results	Contestant
Miss USA 1998	Massachusetts – Shawnae Jebbia
1st Runner-Up	California – Shauna Gambill
2nd Runner-Up	Missouri – Melanie Breedlove
Top 5	Utah – Melissa Leigh Anderson; Texas – Holly Mills
Top 10	Arizona – Stacey Kole; Louisiana – Debbie Delhomme; (Washington (state)) Washington – Natasha Vantramp; Michigan – Johnelle Ryan; Virginia – Meredith Blankenship

=== Special awards ===
- Miss Congenality: Vera Morris (North Carolina)
- Miss Photogenic: Sonja Glenn (South Carolina)
- Style Award: Meredith Blankenship (Virginia)
- Best in Swimsuit: Shawnae Jebbia (Massachusetts)

== See also ==
- Miss Teen USA 1998
- Miss Universe 1998
