= Miss Massachusetts Teen USA =

Beauty pageant competition

- Formation: 1983
- Type: Beauty pageant
- Headquarters: Malden
- Location: Massachusetts
- Members: Miss Teen USA
- Official language: English
- Key people: Laurie Clemente; Anthony Clemente
- Website: Official Website

The Miss Massachusetts Teen USA competition is the pageant that selects the representative for the state of Massachusetts in the Miss Teen USA pageant. Massachusetts had a number of semi-finalist placings but is not one of the most successful states at Miss Teen USA. Their best placement was in 2001, when Marianna Zaslavsky placed 2nd runner-up to Marissa Whitley.

The most notable Miss Massachusetts Teen USA is Susie Castillo, who went on to win the Miss Massachusetts USA and Miss USA crowns. She is one of six Massachusetts teens to win the respective Miss title. One other Teen also competed at Miss America.

Brooke Goodrich of Oxford was crowned Miss Massachusetts Teen USA 2026 on June 21, 2026 at DoubleTree by Hilton Hotel Boston North Shore in Danvers. She will represent Massachusetts for the title of Miss Teen USA 2026.

== Gallery of titleholders ==
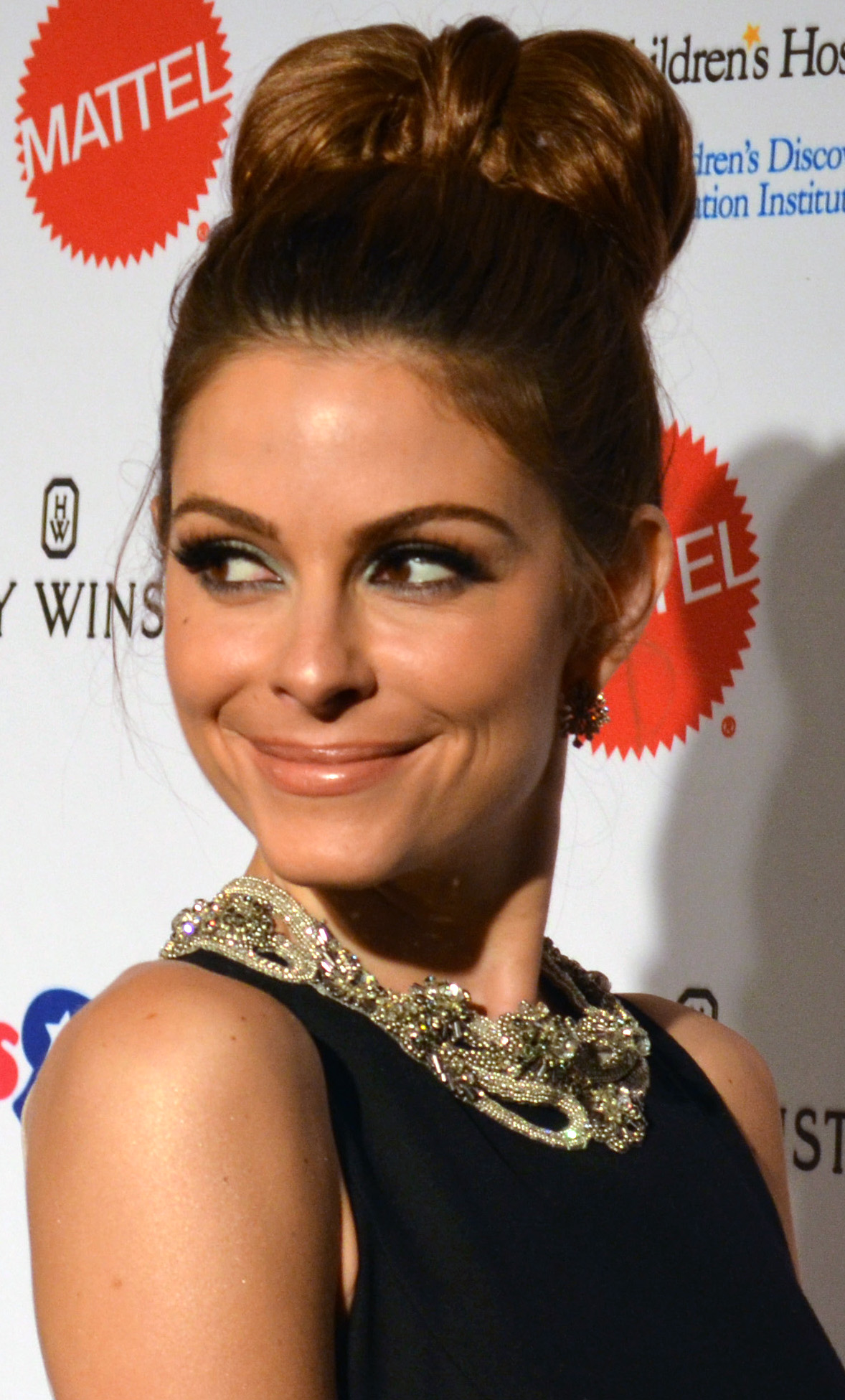
Maria Menounos, Miss Massachusetts Teen USA 1996

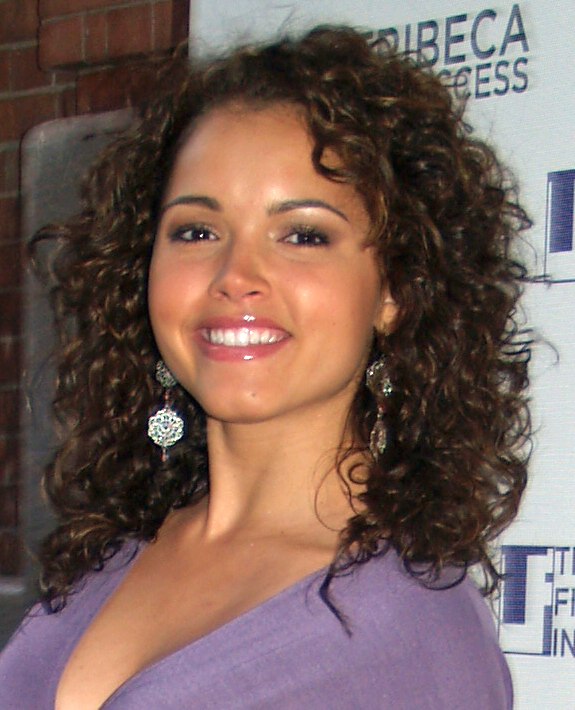
Susie Castillo, Miss Massachusetts Teen USA 1998, Miss Massachusetts USA 2003 and Miss USA 2003

== Results summary ==
=== Placements ===
- 2nd runners-up: Marianna Zaslavsky (2001)
- 3rd runners-up: Jacqueline Bruno (2003)
- 4th runners-up: Sophie Baird (2015)
- Top 10: Kristen Mastroianni (1987), Jessica Gregory (1997)
- Top 12: Nina Cammarata (1990), Erinn Bartlett (1991)
- Top 15: Caroline Lunny (2008), Bailey Medeiros (2014), Annie Lu (2019)

Massachusetts holds a record of 10 placements at Miss Teen USA.

=== Awards ===
- Best State Costume: Christine "Chris" Lawlor (1983)
- Style Award: Susie Castillo (1998)

== Winners ==
- Declared as Winner
- Ended as runner-up
- Ended as one of the finalists or semifinalists

Year	Name	Hometown	Age^{1}	Local title	Placement at Miss Teen USA	Special awards at Miss Teen USA	Notes
2026	Brooke Goodrich	Oxford	18	Miss Oxford Teen			
2025	Elmire Arsenault	Fairhaven	16	Miss Fairhaven Teen			
2024	Avery Turner	Reading	18	Miss Reading Teen			Daughter of Jennifer Krafve Turner, Miss Massachusetts USA 1999
2023	Yanelyn Quintana	Haverhill	16	Miss Haverhill Teen			
2022	Jillian Driscoll	Lynnfield	17	Miss Lynnfield Teen			Daughter of Jacquelyn Doucette Driscoll, Miss Massachusetts USA 1996
2021	Shannon Malloy	Canton	18				
2020	Annika Sharma	Boston	19				Later Miss Massachusetts USA 2023
2019	Annie Lu	Cambridge	18		Top 15		Eligible as a student of Harvard University at the time of crowning
2018	Lexi Woloshchuk	Monson	18				
2017	Caitlyn Martin	Swansea	17				
2016	Alexis Frasca	Franklin	19				
2015	Sophie Baird	Andover	17		4th runner-up		
2014	Bailey Medeiros	Monson	16		Top 15		
2013	Madyson "Maddy" Milordi	Lynnfield	17				
2012	Jordyn Jagolinzer	Seekonk	16				
2011	Kay Tetreault	South Hadley	18				
2010	Brooke Bibeault	Uxbridge	17				
2009	Katie Vatalaro	Easton	17				
2008	Caroline Lunny	Holliston	17		Top 15		Later Miss Massachusetts USA 2014 and contestant on The Bachelor (season 22)
2007	Katie McNiff	Groton	17				
2006	Caroline Caruso	Wakefield	18				
2005	Alison Cronin	East Weymouth	18				Later Miss Massachusetts USA 2009
2004	Allison Bodwell	Ipswich	18				
2003	Jacqueline Bruno	Assonet	18		3rd runner-up		Later Miss Massachusetts USA 2008; Top 10 at Miss USA 2008
2002	Amanda Birdsell	Marlborough	19				Competed at National Sweetheart 2007 as Miss Rhode Island; Miss National Teenager 2004
2001	Marianna Zaslavsky	Boston	16		2nd runner-up		
2000	Monique Jones	East Bridgewater	17				
1999	Jill Donahue	Wakefield	18				
1998	Susie Castillo	Methuen	18			Style award	Later Miss Massachusetts USA 2003; Miss USA 2003
1997	Jessica Gregory	Kingston	18		Semi-finalist		
1996	Maria Menounos	Medford	18				Actress, journalist and television presenter
1995	Erika Ewald	Hopkinton	16				
1994	Michelle Ann Neves	Fairhaven	15				Later Miss Massachusetts 2000
1993	January Newcombe	Natick	15				
1992	Victoria Grinder	Sagamore Beach	18				
1991	Erinn Bartlett	Longmeadow	18		Semi-finalist		
1990	Nina Cammarata	Boston	17		Semi-finalist		
1989	Molly Rihm	Wilbraham	18	Miss Wilbraham Teen			
1988	Alicia Gawrys	Medway	18				
1987	Kristen Mastroianni	Wilbraham	16	Miss Wilbraham Teen	Semi-finalist		Later Miss Massachusetts USA 1995; Top 12 at Miss USA 1995, she finished 12th
1986	Michelle King	Manchester	19				
1985	Maria Ingles	Holyoke	18				
1984	Shauna Pemberton	Boston	18				
1983	Christine "Chris" Lawlor	Chelsea	16			Best State Costume	

^{1} Age at the time of the Miss Teen USA pageant
