= Miss USA 2003 =

52nd Miss USA pageant

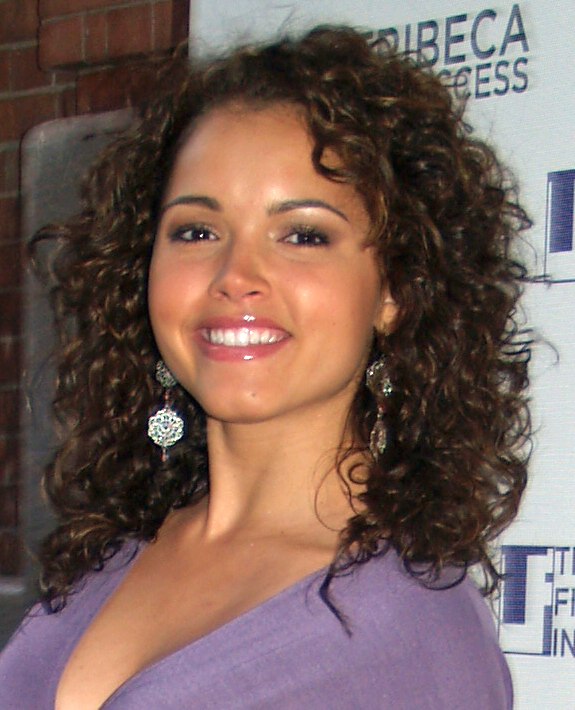
- Miss USA 2003 Susie Castillo
- Date: March 24, 2003
- Presenters: Billy Bush; Daisy Fuentes
- Venue: San Antonio Municipal Auditorium, San Antonio, Texas
- Broadcaster: NBC; WOAI-TV
- Entrants: 51
- Placements: 10
- Winner: Susie Castillo; Massachusetts

Miss USA 2003 was the 52nd Miss USA pageant, held at the San Antonio Municipal Auditorium in San Antonio, Texas on March 24, 2003. It was the first time it had been held in this state since 1996 when the pageant was held in South Padre Island. This was the first Miss USA to be broadcast on NBC, replacing CBS, which had broadcast the pageant since 1963.

The pageant was won by Susie Castillo of Massachusetts, who was crowned by outgoing queen Shauntay Hinton of the District of Columbia. The format reverted to a Top Ten who competed in swimsuit and evening gown, although, as with 2002, there was no interview competition for the semi-finalists.

Daisy Fuentes co-hosted the event for the first time (although she had been a color commentator in 1995), joined by Billy Bush, who would also host the 2004 and 2005 events, as well as the Miss Universe pageants all three years. Color commentary was added by the reigning Miss USA Shauntay Hinton. Entertainment was provided by Burn The Floor.

The judges included future first lady Melania Knauss, soap-opera star Kristian Alfonso, football player Warren Sapp, actor Mekhi Phifer and former astronaut John Blaha.

== Results ==
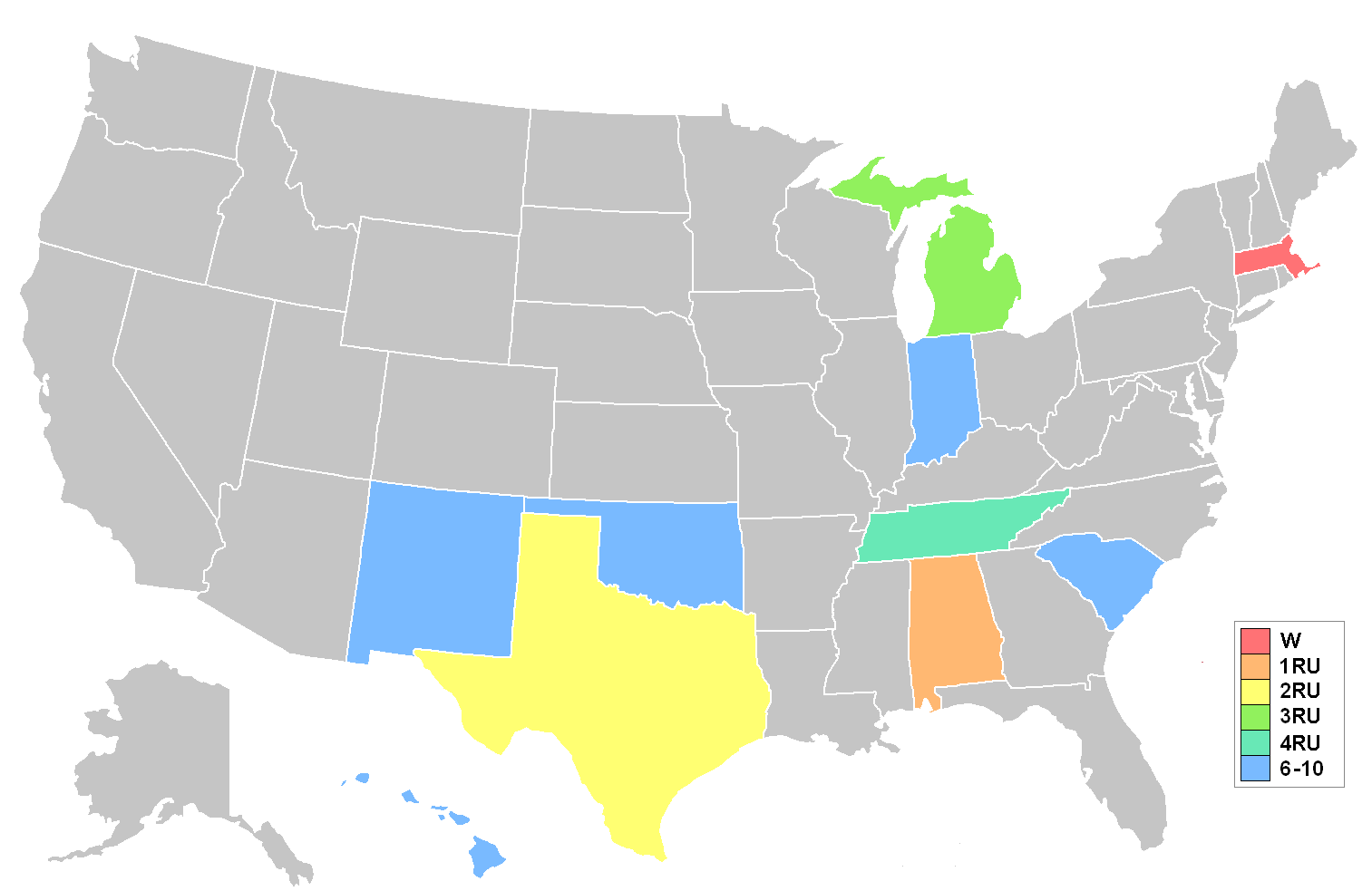
Map showing placements by state

=== Placements ===
Final results	Contestant
Miss USA 2003	Massachusetts – Susie Castillo
1st Runner-Up	Alabama – Michelle Arnette
2nd Runner-Up	Texas – Nicole O'Brian
3rd Runner-Up	Michigan – Elisa Schleef
4th Runner-Up	Tennessee – Beth Hood
Top 10	Hawaii – Alicia Michioka; Indiana – Tashina Kastigar; New Mexico – Alina Ogle; Oklahoma – Star Williams; South Carolina – Anna Hanks

== Judges ==
- Kristian Alfonso
- Brooke Burke
- Vincent Longo
- Gretchen Polhemus
- Melania Knauss
- Mekhi Phifer
- Warren Sapp
- John E. Blaha
