= Cheryl Patton =

American model (born 1949)

- Born: Cheryl Ann Patton; October 23, 1949 (age 76); North Miami Beach, Florida, U.S.
- Beauty pageant titleholder
- Title: Miss Florida USA 1967; Miss USA 1967
- Hair color: Brown
- Eye color: Blue
- Major competitions: Miss Florida World 1966; (1st Runner-up); Miss Florida USA 1967; (Winner); Miss USA 1967; (2nd Runner-Up)

Cheryl Ann Patton (born October 23, 1949) is an American beauty pageant titleholder who has held the Miss USA 1967 title.

== Biography ==
In 1966 Patton was a runner-up in the Miss Florida World pageant. The following year she won the Miss Florida USA 1967 title and represented Florida in the Miss USA 1967 pageant held in Miami Beach in her home state. She placed as second runner-up in the pageant, which was won by Sylvia Hitchcock of Alabama.

In July that year, Hitchcock became the fourth woman from the United States to win the Miss Universe title, and for the first time, one of her runners-up was to be chosen to complete her reign as Miss USA. The first runner-up Susan Ellen Bradley of California, refused to take over the Miss USA title and Patton became Miss USA 1967. This is the only time that the first runner-up has not inherited the reign of the original titleholder. In February 1968 Patton filed a lawsuit alleging that the pageant directors refused to pay her a bonus of $5000 for assuming the title as stipulated in the contract. A judge ruled in her favour in June, stating that it made no difference that the sum had already been paid to Hitchcock.

Patton's reign as Miss USA was the first time that a Floridian has held the title.

Patton later married and had a son. In the 1980s she was still living in North Miami.

== Notes ==
^{note 1} Patton was originally second runner-up, but became Miss USA after the original titleholder, Sylvia Hitchcock, won Miss Universe and first runner-Up, Susan Bradley, refused the title. Due to pageant protocol Miss USA must resign her title in the event she wins Miss Universe.
