= Miss Alabama Teen USA =

Beauty pageant competition

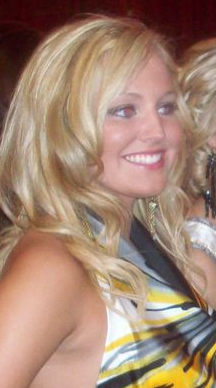
- Courtney Parker, Miss Alabama Teen USA 2008
- Formation: 1983
- Type: Beauty pageant
- Headquarters: Aiken
- Location: South Carolina
- Members: Miss Teen USA
- Official language: English
- Website: Official website

Miss Alabama Teen USA is the pageant that selects the representative for the state of Alabama in the Miss Teen USA pageant and the name of the title held by that winner. It is the sister pageant to the Miss Alabama USA title.

During the pageant, contestants compete in three areas: interview, activewear, and evening gown. Until the 2018 pageant a swimsuit competition was held in place of activewear.

Until 2010 Alabama was directed by the Premier Pageants group, and was the first state to be taken under this directorate. Dohn Dye, operating as "To Dye For" was the Director for the 2010 and 2011 pageants, but were replaced by Paula Miles and RPM Productions in August 2011. This company resigned in 2024 and it is unknown who will produce the pageants in the future.

The current titleholder is Raiah Jolynn Dona of Montgomery, who was crowned on July 11, 2026 at Mississippi State University in Starkville. Dona will represent Alabama at Miss Teen USA 2026.

== Results summary ==
=== Placements ===
- 3rd runner-up: Erin Snow (2016)
- 4th runners-up: Anna Mingus (1988), Kalin Burt (2019)
- Top 6: Christine King (1992)
- Top 10: Jeannie Plott (1989), Terra Moody (2004), Canden Jackson (2007), Ava LeBlanc (2024)
- Top 15/16: Courtney Parker (2008), Ashlyn Alongi (2010), Peyton Brown (2012), Lorin Holcombe (2013), Taylor Ryan Elliott (2015)

Alabama holds a record of 13 placements at Miss Teen USA.

=== Awards ===
- Miss Congeniality: Anna Mingus (1988), Kennedy Cromeens (2018)
- Miss Photogenic: Sarah-Baskin Champion (2014), Erin Snow (2016)
- Best in Social Media: Ava Marie LeBlanc (2024)

== Winners ==
- Declared as Winner
- Ended as runner-up
- Ended as one of the finalists or semifinalists

Year	Name	Hometown	Age (Note: Age at the time of the Miss Teen USA pageant)	Local title	Placement at Miss Teen USA	Special awards at Miss Teen USA	Notes
2026	Raiah Jolynn Dona	Montgomery	17	Miss Montgomery Teen			
2025	Britain Fuller	Satsuma	16	Miss North Mobile Teen			
2024	Ava Marie LeBlanc	Columbiana	18	Miss Shelby County Teen	Top 10	Best in Social Media	Sister of Marcelle LeBlanc, Miss Alabama's Outstanding Teen 2021 & Miss America's Outstanding Teen 2022
2023	Kensey Collins	Spanish Fort	15	Miss Spanish Fort Teen			
2022	AnnaLee Story	Auburn	18	Miss Tiger Town Teen			
2021	Dailyn Swann	Greenville	18	Miss Sherling Lake Teen			
2020	Katie Watts	Mobile	14	Miss Mobile Teen			
2019	Kalin Burt	Hoover	18	Miss Hoover Teen	4th runner-up		
2018	Kennedy Cromeens	Birmingham	16	Miss Shelby County Teen		Miss Congeniality	
2017	Claire Scott	Birmingham	17	Over The Mountain Teen			
2016	Erin Snow	Gadsden	17	Miss Gadsden Teen	3rd runner-up	Miss Photogenic	Later 3rd runner-up at Miss Alabama USA 2020; Later 1st runner-up at Miss Georgia USA 2021
2015	Taylor Ryan Elliott	Trussville	18	Miss Trussville Teen	Top 15		
2014	Sarah-Baskin Champion	Vestavia Hills	18	Miss Vestavia Hills Teen		Miss Photogenic	
2013	Lorin Holcombe	Alexander City	17	Miss Central Alabama Teen	Top 16		Later 3rd runner-up at Miss Alabama USA 2018; Later 1st runner-up at Miss Georgia USA 2019
2012	Peyton Brown	Eufaula	17	Miss Barbour County Teen	Top 16		Later Miss Alabama USA 2016; Top 5 at Miss USA 2016
2011	Barron Rae "Scoot" Williams	Dadeville	15	Miss Lake Martin Teen			Later 1st runner-up at Miss Alabama USA 2016; Later 2nd runner-up at Miss Alabama USA 2017
2010	Ashlyn Alongi	Huntsville	17		Top 15		Later top 15 semifinalist at Miss Tennessee USA 2014
2009	Alexandria Blansit	Fort Payne	16				Later top 15 semifinalist at Miss Alabama USA 2012
2008	Courtney Parker	Daphne	16		Top 15		
2007	Canden Jackson	Fairhope	17		Top 10		Later 2nd runner-up at Miss Alabama USA 2012; Contestant on Get Out Alive with Bear Grylls
2006	Carla Baumann	Hueytown	18				
2005	Kristen Bell	Aliceville	17				
2004	Terra Moody	Birmingham	17		Top 10		
2003	Katherine Lauren Whitlock	Birmingham	18				
2002	Hailey Capps	Dothan	18				
2001	Rollins Albritton	Andalusia	18				
2000	Alexis Dollar	Rehobeth	18				
1999	Starla Smith	Rehobeth	18				Later Miss United States 2001
1998	Heather Baugh	Woodville	18				
1997	Tara Tucker	Pelham	18				Later Miss Alabama USA 2002; Semi-finalist at Miss USA 2002
1996	Luann Roberts	Brantley	17				
1995	Jennifer Otts	Hoover	17				
1994	Melanie McLin	Daleville					
1993	Autumn Smith	Chelsea					Later Miss Alabama USA 1997; Semi-finalist at Miss USA 1997; Daughter of racing driver Stanley Smith whom suffered a terrible crash at Talladega Superspeedway just days before
1992	Christine King	Prattville	18		Top 6		
1991	Stephanie Gwantley	Huntsville					Contestant on season 13 of The Bachelor
1990	Candi Byrd	Birmingham					
1989	Jeannie Plott	Birmingham	18		Top 10		
1988	Anna Mingus	Enterprise	18		4th runner-up	Miss Congeniality	Later Miss Alabama USA 1995
1987	Elizabeth Woodman	Pleasant Grove	17				
1986	Gail Magee	Alexander City					
1985	Teresa Cain	Chelsea					
1984	Teresa Chappell	Westover					
1983	Jill Renee Johnson	Arley	17				
