= Marcelle LeBlanc =

American television actor

- Born: March 19, 2003 (age 23); Birmingham, Alabama, U.S.
- Education: Auburn University
- Occupation: Actress
- Years active: 2014–present
- Television: Stranger Things season 2 (2017)
- Height: 5 ft 1 in (155 cm)

Marcelle LeBlanc (born March 19, 2003) is a film and television actress.

LeBlanc appeared in an episode of Stranger Things, acting alongside Gaten Matarazzo. She appeared as a guest star on Criminal Minds as well before landing a role in a film called Union. She has had roles in Cobra Kai, Grey's Anatomy, and Fear Street Part Two: 1978.

== Early life ==
LeBlanc is from Birmingham, Alabama. She has a younger sister, Ava LeBlanc who was Miss Alabama Teen USA 2024. She began participating in theater at age 11. At age 14, she founded an initiative to provide other children with scholarships to participate in after-school arts programs, in cooperation with the Alabama Arts Alliance non-profit for which she is a state spokesperson.

== Pageantry ==
In December 2019, she entered the Miss Coosa Valley's Teen pageant, earned the title of Miss Alabama's Teen 2021 in 2020, and won the Miss America’s Teen 2022 title on July 30, 2021. During the national pageant, she won top overall interview and a preliminary talent competition award, and her title-holding year is dedicated to promoting the arts scholarship organization she founded and lobbying for funding for arts programs.

== Personal life ==
LeBlanc enrolled at Auburn University in fall 2021, where she joined the Alpha Gamma Delta sorority and plans to major in accounting while continuing to act in film and television.

== Filmography ==
2021

- The Waltons: Homecoming - Mary Ellen Walton
- Just Beyond, episode "My Monster" - Jade
- PEN15, episode "Jacuzzi" - Venice (voice)
- Fear Street Part Two: 1978 - Becky
- Cobra Kai, episode "Aftermath" - Stacy

2020

- Super Science Showcase - Becky Thatcher

2018

- False Profits - Cassidy
- Union - Josephine
- Criminal Minds, episode "Full-Tilt Boogie" - Dana Gaines

2017

- Father Figures - Schoolgirl (uncredited)
- Stranger Things, episode "Chapter Nine: The Gate" - Cute Girl

Awards and achievements
Preceded by Payton May	Miss America's Outstanding Teen; 2022	Succeeded by Morgan Greco
Preceded by Zoé Champion	Miss Alabama's Outstanding Teen; 2019	Succeeded by Emma Terry
