= Miss America's Outstanding Teen 2022 =

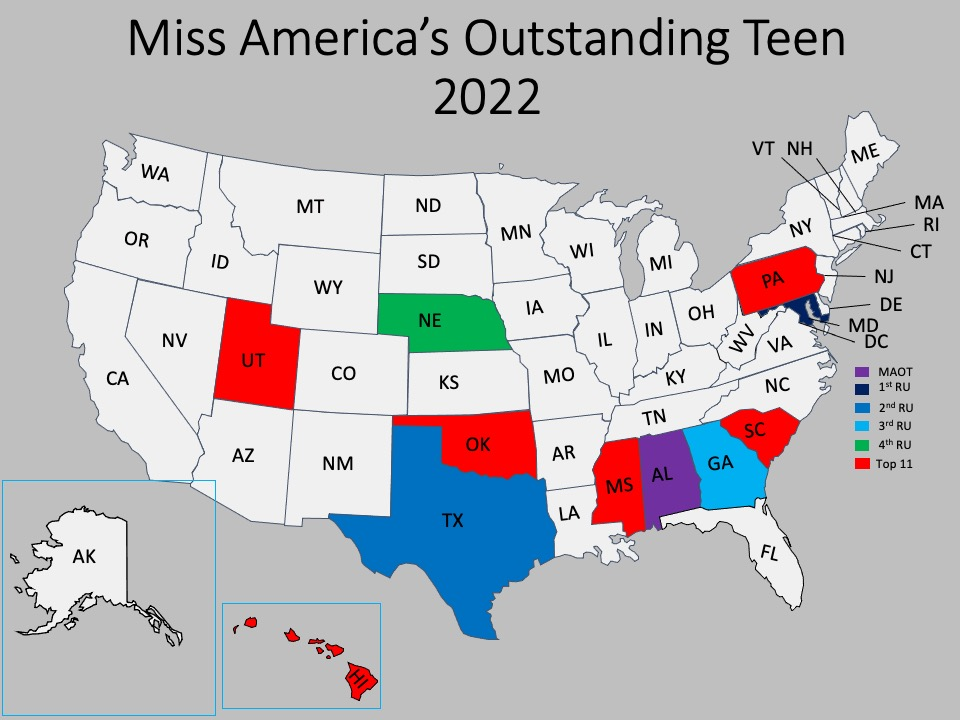
- Date: July 10, 2021
- Presenters: Ericka Dunlap
- Venue: Loews Royal Pacific Resort, Universal Orlando, Orlando, Florida, United States
- Entrants: 51
- Placements: 11
- Winner: Marcelle LeBlanc; Alabama

Miss America's Outstanding Teen 2022 was the 15th Miss America's Outstanding Teen pageant held in Orlando, Florida. Due to the COVID-19 pandemic, the planned 2021 edition was originally scheduled on August 8, 2020, the preliminary competitions were also scheduled on August 4–6, 2020, but it was postponed indefinitely. It has been announced that pageant would be held on July 10, 2021, with preliminary competitions were held on July 7–8, 2021.

Payton May of Washington crowned her successor, Marcelle LeBlanc of Alabama, at the end of the event.

== Overview ==
The COVID-19 pandemic heavily disrupted the MAOT state pageant competitions were originally scheduled from late-March to June 2020 were postponed to 2021 or cancelled outright. However, five contestants had already crowned prior to the pandemic and they were Alabama, Minnesota, New Hampshire, New Jersey and Utah.

Due to restrictions implemented in 50 states and District of Columbia (except those state pageants were held prior to the pandemic), numerous health and safety guidelines have been implemented for contestants, production members, and audiences at state pageants, such as taking a negative COVID-19 test and following social distancing. Additionally, a number of state pageants have had to alter their initial venue choices due to shut-downs implemented by their governor.

== Judges ==
- Dolvett Quince – entrepreneur, fitness model, actor and The Biggest Loser trainer
- Natalie Ellis
- Ethan Zohn – Survivor winner and motivational speaker
- Dr. Brittany Revell
- Jasmine Murray – Miss Mississippi's Outstanding Teen 2007, Miss Mississippi 2014 and American Idol season 8 contestant

== Results ==
=== Placements ===
Placement	Contestant
Miss America's Outstanding Teen 2022	Alabama – Marcelle LeBlanc
1st Runner-Up	Maryland – Kate Wills §
2nd Runner-Up	Texas – Katherine Omo-Osagie
3rd Runner-Up	Georgia – Megan Wright
4th Runner-Up	Nebraska – Jamie Rose Chen
Top 11	Hawaii – Ilima Sexton; Mississippi – Tori Johnston; Oklahoma – Ella Phillips; Pennsylvania – Jaylen Baron; South Carolina – Dabria Aguilar; Utah – Charlee Sorensen

§ – America's/People's Choice

=== Top 11 ===
1. Nebraska
2. Texas
3. Pennsylvania
4. Oklahoma
5. Georgia
6. Mississippi
7. Hawaii
8. Maryland
9. Utah
10. South Carolina
11. Alabama

=== Top 5 ===
1. Alabama
2. Nebraska
3. Texas
4. Georgia
5. Maryland

=== Awards ===
==== Preliminary Awards ====
Award	Contestant
Preliminary Evening Wear/OSQ	Georgia – Megan Wright; Texas – Katherine Omo-Osagie
Preliminary Talent	Alabama – Marcelle LeBlanc; Utah – Charlee Sorensen

==== Other Awards ====
Award	Contestant
Advertising Sales	Montana – Annika Bennion; South Carolina – Dabria Aguilar
America's Choice	Maryland – Kate Wills
Spirit of America	Maryland – Kate Wills
Teens in Action Winner	Arizona – Kate Lynn Blair
Teens in Action Finalists	Alabama – Marcelle LeBlanc; Florida – Ruby Tilghman; Indiana – Kate Dimmit; Iowa – Maggie Leach; Montana – Annika Bennion; New Hampshire – Isabel Povey; Pennsylvania – Jaylen Baron
Top Dance Talent	South Carolina – Dabria Aguilar
Top Interview	Alabama – Marcelle LeBlanc; Pennsylvania – Jaylen Baron; Texas – Katherine Omo-Osagie
Top Vocal Talent	Utah – Charlee Sorensen

== Contestants ==
All 51 state titleholders have been crowned.

- Declared as winner
- Ended as a runner-up
- Ended as a finalist or semi-finalist

State	Name	Age	Hometown	Talent	Placement	Awards	Notes
Alabama	Marcelle LeBlanc	16	Birmingham	Vocal, "On My Own"	Winner	Teens in Action Award Finalist Preliminary Talent Award Top Interview Award	Older sister of Miss Alabama Teen USA 2024, Ava LeBlanc Actress featured in Stranger Things, Fear Street Part Two: 1978, Criminal Minds, and Grey's Anatomy
Alaska	Sycely Wheeles	15	Anchorage	Vocal, "Into the Unknown"			Previously Miss Alaska Jr High School America 2017
Arizona	Kate Lynn Blair	16	Phoenix	Lyrical Dance, "Something in the Water"		Teen in Action Award Winner	
Arkansas	Shelby Cook	18	Huntsville	Lyrical Dance, "Via Dolorosa"			
California	Maya Alvarez-Coyne	18	Irvine	Irish Fusion Dance			First Latina to win Miss California's Outstanding Teen
Colorado	Lila Sacha	18	Centennial	Lyrical Dance			
Connecticut	Aicha Diallo	17	West Haven	Dance, "Brotsjor"			
Delaware	Haley Alexander	18	Wilmington	Contemporary Dance, "Stand Tall"			
(Washington, D.C.) District of Columbia	Jade Ridout	16	Washington D.C.	Monologue, "Hey Queen"			
Florida	Ruby Tilghman	17	Panama City	Broadway Vocal, "Finding Wonderland"		Teens in Action Award Finalist	Later Miss Alabama 2026
(Georgia (U.S. state)) Georgia	Megan Wright	18	Calhoun	Broadway Vocal, "Astonishing"	3rd Runner-up	Preliminary Evening Gown/OSQ Award	
Hawaii	Ilima Sexton	15	'Ewa Beach	Hip Hop Dance, "Fallin'"	Top 11		
Idaho	Madison Andreason	18	Idaho Falls	Vocal, "Rise Up"			Later Miss Idaho 2024 Daughter of Miss Idaho USA 1987, Vicki Hoffman Andreason
Illinois	Kylie Ryder	18	Sycamore	Lyrical Dance, "Who You Are"			
Indiana	Kate Dimmit	18	Zionsville	Classical Violin, "Praeludium and Allegro"		Teens in Action Award Finalist	Later Miss Illinois 2026
Iowa	Maggie Leach	17	Pella	Musical Theater Vocal, "You Will Be Found"		Teens in Action Award Finalist	Previously Miss Iowa Teen America 2018 Previously Miss Iowa High School 2020
Kansas	Gracie Hendrickson	16	Wichita	Vocal, "Over the Rainbow"			Later Miss Kansas Teen USA 2022
Kentucky	Chloe Yates	17	Prospect	Gymnastics, "Ease On down the Road"			Younger sister of Miss Alabama Volunteer 2022, Claire Yates
Louisiana	Sophia Nawaz	17	New Orleans	Pop Vocal, "C'est si Bon"			
Maine	Lauren Jorgensen	18	Winthrop	Vocal, "The Rainbow Connection"			
Maryland	Kate Wills	17	Frederick	Jazz Dance, "Big Time"	1st Runner-up	America's Choice Spirit of America Award	
Massachusetts	Tess O'Riordan	17	Canton	Jazz Dance, "Feeling Good"			
Michigan	Rylie Dewley	17	Grand Blanc	Baton Twirling, "Let's Get Loud"			
Minnesota	Bella Grill	15	Lino Lakes	Lyrical Dance, "Humble and Kind"			
Mississippi	Tori Johnston	18	Madison	Broadway Vocal, "Tomorrow"	Top 11		
Missouri	Ashley Berry	17	Clinton	Ballet en Pointe, "The Fifth (Requiem)"			Later Miss Missouri 2024
Montana	Annika Bennion	17	Sidney	Violin, "Yankee Doodle, Op. 17"		Teens in Action Award Finalist Top Advertisement Sales Award (tie)	Older sister of Miss Montana's Outstanding Teen 2022, Bronté Bennion Daughter of Miss New Mexico USA 1993, Daniela Johnson Bennion
Nebraska	Jamie Rose Chen	17	Scottsbluff	Piano, "Tarantella in A Minor"	4th Runner-up		
Nevada	Isabella McGinnis	16	Las Vegas	Tap Dance, "Proud Mary"			
New Hampshire	Isabel Povey	17	Hampstead	Jazz Dance, "Think"		Teens in Action Award Finalist	
New Jersey	Isabella Freund	17	Ocean View	Piano, "Moonlight Sonata"			
New Mexico	Dallas Collins	18	Alamogordo	Vocal, "What About Us"			
(New York (state)) New York	Gianna Caetano	17	Lancaster	Piano, "Midnight Escapade"			
North Carolina	Harley Tilque	17	Charlotte	Lyrical Dance, "Rescue"			
North Dakota	Emma Tong	18	Williston	Lyrical Dance, "Jealous"			Later Miss North Dakota 2026
Ohio	Madison Yuzwa	18	Broadview Heights	Competitive Tumbling, "Broken Heels"			
Oklahoma	Ella Phillips	18	Tulsa	Classical Vocal, "The Doll Aria"	Top 11		
Oregon	Moira O'Bryan	18	Coos Bay	Musical Theater Vocal			
Pennsylvania	Jaylen Baron	19	Eagleville	Musical Theater Dance	Top 11	Teens in Action Award Finalist Top Interview Award (tie)	
Rhode Island	Alexa Johnsen	17	North Kingstown	Saxophone			
South Carolina	Dabria Aguilar	17	Hanahan	Contemporary Ballet Dance	Top 11	Top Advertisement Sales Award (tie) Top Dance Talent Award	
South Dakota	Kianna Healy	18	Hartford	Musical Theater Vocal, "I'm a Star"			Later Miss South Dakota 2026
Tennessee	Taylor Black	18	Gallatin	Vocal, "At Last"			First African-American crowned Miss Tennessee's Outstanding Teen
Texas	Katherine Omo-Osagie	17	Carrollton	Vocal, "How Far I'll Go"	2nd Runner-up	Preliminary Evening Gown/OSQ Award Top Interview Award (tie)	
Utah	Charlee Sorensen	17	Aurora	Operatic Vocal	Top 11	Preliminary Talent Award Top Vocal Talent Award	Younger sister of Miss Utah's Outstanding Teen 2015, Savvy Sorensen
Vermont	Emma Anderson	17	Shelburne	Tap Dance, "Another Day of Sun"			
Virginia	Ella Strickland	18	Warrenton	Broadway Vocal			
(Washington (state)) Washington	Chloe Furnstahl	17	Lake Tapps	Jazz Dance			
West Virginia	Olivia Travis	16	Gerrardstown	Lyrical Dance			Previously Miss West Virginia Jr. High School America 2018 Top 16 at Miss Jr. High School America 2018 Later Miss West Virginia Teen USA 2024
Wisconsin	Eve Vanden Heuvel	17	Freedom	Piano			
Wyoming	Cassandra "Cassie" Guelde	18	Story	Vocal			
