= Cleo Maletis =

Canadian-American pageant titleist (1925–2009)

"Mrs. America 1957" leaving for European Tour with parents Tom and Pagoula Michas.

Cleo Nicki Maletis (March 11, 1925 – November 9, 2009) was a Canadian-born American beauty pageant titleholder. She was crowned Mrs. America 1957, the 19th Mrs. America in the original (1936–1968) pageant of that name.

== Life and family ==
Maletis was born in Saskatoon, Saskatchewan, Canada to Greek immigrant parents Thomas and Pagoula "Peggy" Michas and grew up in Vancouver, British Columbia, Canada. She went on to receive her B.A. from the University of Washington in home economics, graduating in 1946. One year later on June 28, 1947 Cleo married Chris C. Maletis, Jr., in Vancouver. After she became a U.S. citizen, the couple moved to Portland, where her husband had grown up. Together they had four boys: Chris III (born 1948), Tom (born 1951), Ed (born 1954), and Rob (born 1957).

While pregnant with her youngest son Rob, she was crowned Mrs. America 1957. During her reign, she visited numerous European countries as an honorary ambassador. During this tour, Maletis became interested in the growing trend of working mothers in Denmark, praising the Danish nurseries that allowed for both parents to work; a trend not yet realized for 1957 suburban Portland.

In 1964, Maletis joined her husband in running his family's beer and wine distribution businesses, Maletis Inc. and the Columbia Distributing Company.

== Death ==
June 2007

After settling in Portland, Cleo and Chris Maletis remained in the Portland metropolitan area. She had started suffering the effects of Alzheimer's disease for some years before he died, at 84, on February 9, 2008, having been married for 60 years. She died, also at age 84, on November 9, 2009.
