= Miss Alabama USA =

Beauty pageant competition

- Formation: 1952
- Type: Beauty pageant
- Headquarters: Birmingham
- Location: Alabama
- Members: Miss USA
- Official language: English
- Key people: Janice McDonald; Paula Miles
- Website: Official website

Miss Alabama USA, previously known as Miss Alabama Universe, is the beauty pageant that selects the representative for the state of Alabama in the Miss USA pageant, and the name of the title held by its winner. The pageant is directed by RPM Productions.

Alabama's most successful placement was in 1967, when Sylvia Hitchcock was crowned Miss USA. She later went on to be crowned Miss Universe 1967 as well. Alabama's most recent placement was in 2023, when Sophie Burzynski placed Top 20.

The current Miss Alabama USA is Samantha Havenstrite of Birmingham, who was crowned on July 11, 2026 at Mississippi State University in Starkville. Havenstrite will represent Alabama at Miss USA 2026.

== Gallery of titleholders ==
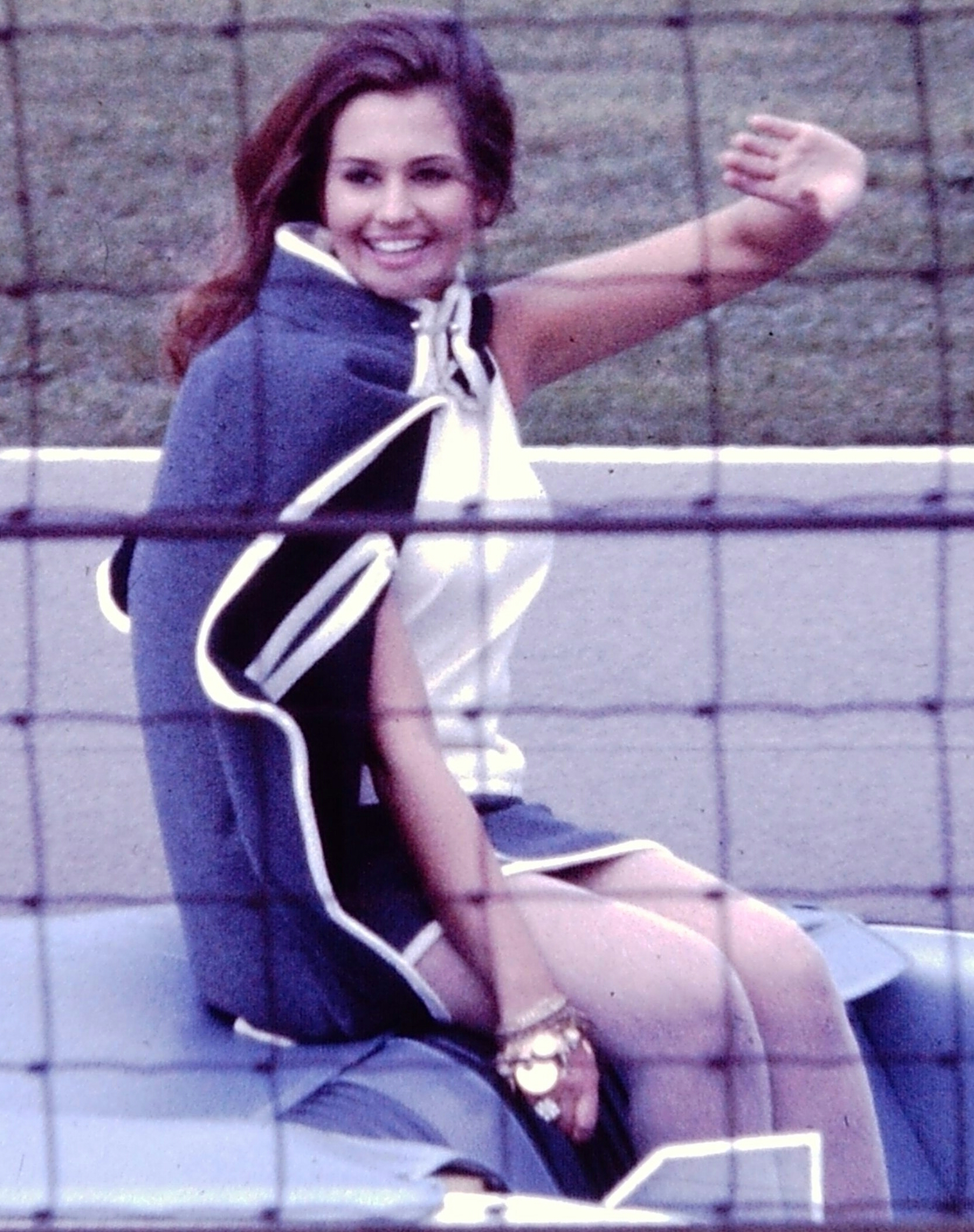
Sylvia Hitchcock, Miss Alabama USA 1967, Miss USA 1967, and Miss Universe 1967

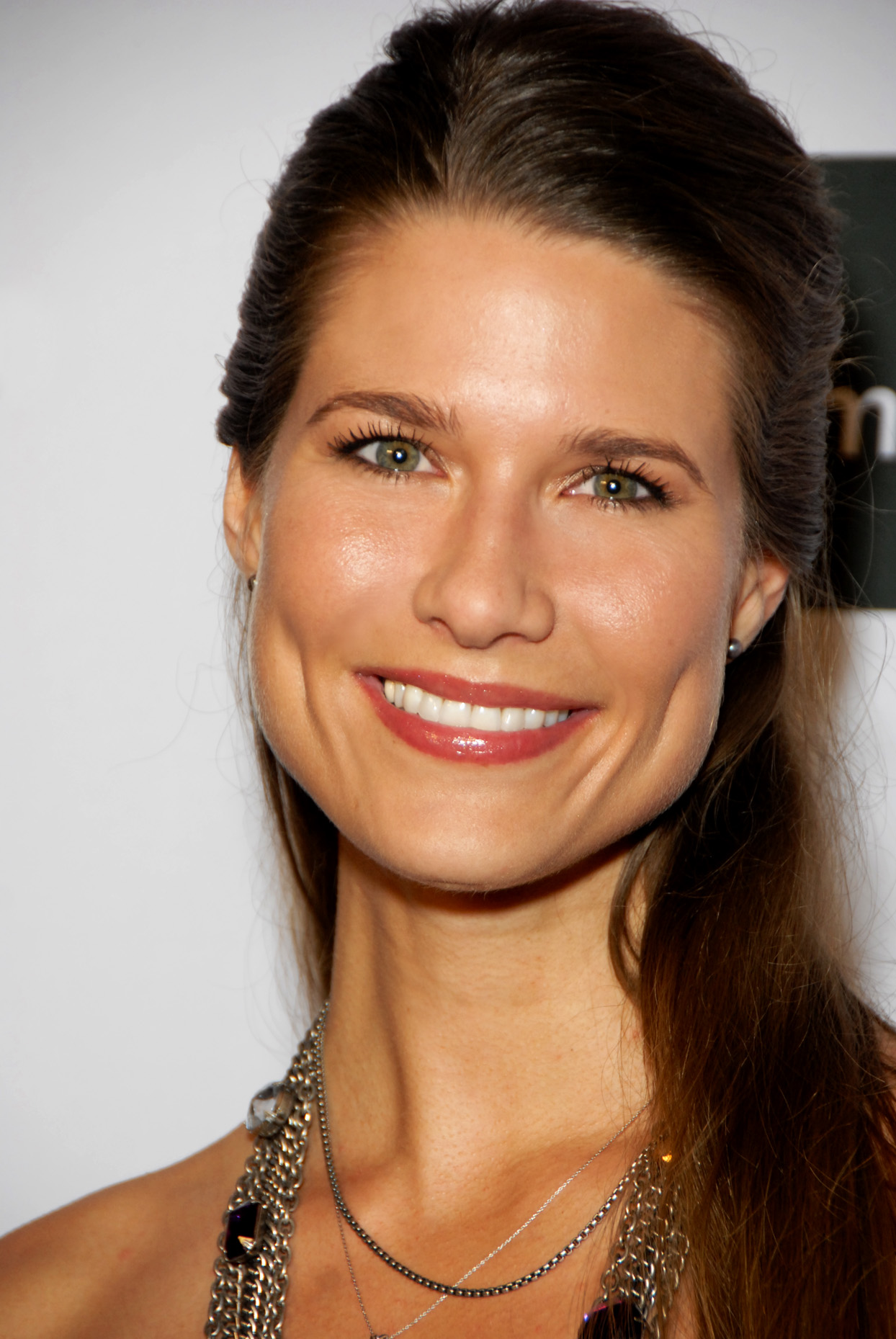
Tara Darby, Miss Alabama USA 2004

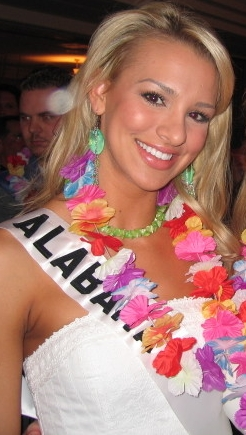
Haleigh Stidham, Miss Alabama USA 2006

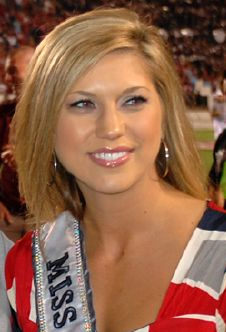
Keisha Walding, Miss Alabama USA 2008

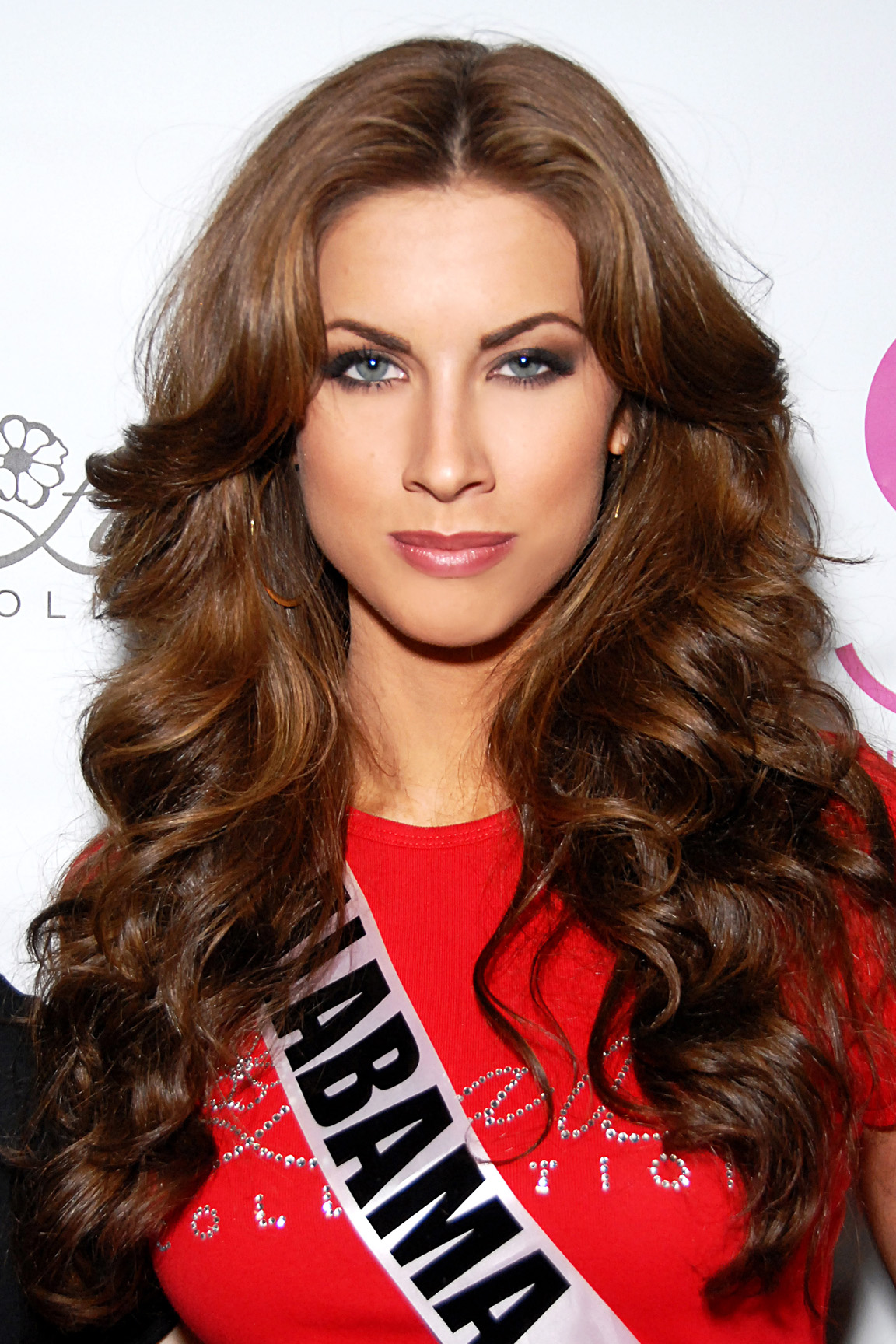
Katherine Webb, Miss Alabama USA 2012

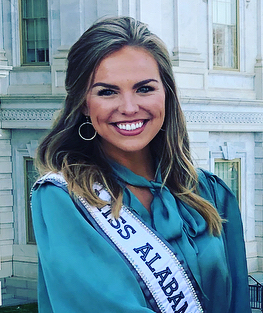
Hannah Brown, Miss Alabama USA 2018

== Results summary ==
=== Placements in Miss USA ===
- Miss USA: Sylvia Hitchcock (Miss Universe 1967)
- 1st Runners-Up: Pamela Flowers (1975), Candace Brown (1992), Michelle Arnette (2003), Mary-Margaret McCord (2013)
- 2nd Runners-Up: Doris Edwards (1953), Judith Carlson (1958), Margaret Gordon (1960), Jina Mitchell (2000), Madeline Mitchell (2011)
- 3rd Runner-Up: Pamela "Pam" Rigas (1980)
- 4th Runner-Up: Suellen Robinson (1961), Kelly Hutchinson (2020)
- Top 5: Peyton Brown (2016)
- Top 10/11/12: JoAnne Henderson (1981), Candy Carley (1991), Autumn Smith (1997), Tara Tucker (2002), Tara Darby (2004), Haleigh Stidham (2006), Audrey Moore (2010), Katherine Webb (2012), Madison Guthrie (2015), Kennedy Whisenant (2025)
- Top 15/20: Pat Sullivan (1959), Dinah "Diana" Armstrong (1963), Pamela Jean Borgfeldt (1964), Leigh Sanford (1965), Claudia Robinson (1968), Hitsy Parnell (1969), Jesica Ahlberg (2014), Sophie Burzynski (2023)

Alabama has a record of 32 placements at Miss USA.

=== Awards ===
- Miss Congeniality: Peyton Brown (2016)
- Miss Photogenic: Pamela Flowers (1975), Rebecca Moore (2007), Audrey Moore (2010)

== Titleholders ==
Color key

- Winner
- Runner-up
- Semi-finalist

Year	Name	Hometown	Age (Note: Age at the time of the crowning)	Local title	Placement at Miss USA	Special awards at Miss USA	Notes
2026	Samantha Havenstrite	Birmingham	27	Miss Birmingham			
2025	Kennedy Whisenant	Birmingham	24	Miss North Central	Top 10		
2024	Diane Westhoven	Vestavia	21	Miss Southern Plains			
2023	Sophie Burzynski	Auburn	21	Miss Auburn-Opelika	Top 20		
2022	Katelyn Vinson	Dothan	21	Miss Dothan			
2021	Alexandria Flanigan	Cullman	24	Miss Cullman			
2020	Kelly Hutchinson	Auburn	22	Miss Auburn-Opelika	4th runner-up		Previously Miss Georgia's Outstanding Teen 2013
2019	Hannah McMurphy	Tuscaloosa	20	Miss Indian Hills			
2018	Hannah Brown	Northport	23	Miss West Alabama			Contestant on season 23 of The Bachelor; Star of season 15 of The Bachelorette; Winner of season 28 of Dancing with the Stars
2017	Baylee Smith	Tuscaloosa	19	Miss Pike County			
2016	Peyton Brown	Eufaula	21	Miss Eufaula	Top 5	Miss Congeniality	Previously Miss Alabama Teen USA 2012
2015	Madison Guthrie	Hoover	20	Miss Hoover	Top 11		
2014	Jesica Ahlberg	Birmingham	23	Miss Central Alabama	Top 20		
2013	Mary-Margaret McCord	Gadsden	23	Miss Gadsden	1st runner-up		
2012	Katherine Elizabeth Webb	Phenix City	22	Miss East Alabama	Top 10		
2011	Madeline Grace Mitchell	Russellville	21	Miss Tuscaloosa	2nd runner-up		Later Mrs. America 2015
2010	Audrey Moore	Hoover	20		Top 10	Miss Photogenic	
2009	Rachel Philippona	Dothan	19				
2008	Keisha Walding	Dothan	24				
2007	Rebecca Moore	Vestavia Hills	19			Miss Photogenic	
2006	Haleigh Stidham	Birmingham	23		Top 10		
2005	Jessica Tinney	Birmingham	21				
2004	Tara Darby	Birmingham	22		Top 10		
2003	Michelle Arnette	Dothan	25		1st runner-up		
2002	Tara Tucker	Birmingham	23		Top 12		Previously Miss Alabama Teen USA 1997
2001	Laura Hoffman	Birmingham	20				
2000	Jina Mitchell	Trussville	22		2nd runner-up		
1999	Doree Walker	Gardendale	24				
1998	Paige Brooks	Mobile	26				
1997	Autumn Smith	Chelsea	22		Top 10		Previously Miss Alabama Teen USA 1993; Daughter of racing driver Stanley Smith
1996	Benita Brooks	Huntsville	25				
1995	Anna Mingus	Enterprise	-				Previously Miss Alabama Teen USA 1988
1994	Malaea Nelms	Alexandria	-				
1993	Toni Johnson	Montgomery	22				First African-American Miss Alabama USA
1992	Candace Michelle Brown	Auburn	23		1st runner-up		
1991	Candy Carley	Mobile	25		Top 11		
1990	Natalie Moore	Hoover					
1989	Sheri Mooney	Pelham	20				
1988	Rhonda Mooney	Pelham	21				
1987	Rhonda Leigh Garrett	Birmingham	21				
1986	Heather Howard	Huntsville	20				
1985	Allison Sawyer	Birmingham	-				
1984	Kelly Flowers	Hueytown	20				
1983	Terri Lane	Birmingham	20				
1982	Lisa Wheeler	Birmingham	19				
1981	JoAnne Henderson	Tuscaloosa	21		Top 12		
1980	Pamela Helena "Pam" Rigas	Troy	19		3rd runner-up		Later Miss Ohio 1983
1979	Rose Molly Burch	Mobile	20				Later married to professional football quarterback Ken Stabler
1978	Eva Jo Stancil	Birmingham	22				
1977	Cheryl Burgess	Alexandria	18				
1976	Kyle Ellis	Decatur	22				
1975	Pamela Renee "Pam" Flowers	Headland	19		1st runner-up	Miss Photogenic	
1974	Iva Wyna Lavas	Birmingham	19				
1973	Diane Fouilhe	Enterprise	19				
1972	Elaine Barnhill	Robertsdale	21				
1971	Renee Smith	Mobile	18				
1970	Kathleen Louise "Kathy" Bryant	Bay Minette	19				
1969	Hitsy Parnell	Thomasville	20		Top 15		
1968	Claudia Anne Robinson	Mobile	18		Top 15	Top 15 Best in Swimsuit	
1967	Sylvia Louise Hitchcock	Tuscaloosa	21		Miss USA 1967		Miss Universe 1967
1966	Susan Scott	Clanton	19				
1965	Leigh Stanford	Montgomery	18		Top 15		
1964	Pamela Jean "Pam" Borgfeldt	Anniston	21		Top 15		1st runner-up at Miss Alabama USA 1963
1963	Dinah "Diana" Irene Armstrong	Montgomery	19		Top 15		
1962	Jerolyn Ridgeway	Fort Payne	20				
1961	Suellen Robinson	Fairfax	20		4th runner-up		
1960	Margaret Jo Gordon	Homewood	21		2nd runner-up		
1959	Pat Sullivan	Birmingham	21		Top 15		
1958	Judith Lucille Carlson	Birmingham	18		2nd runner-up		
Did not compete between 1954 and 1957
1953	Doris Edwards	Birmingham	25		2nd runner-up		
1952	Doris Edwards	Gadsden	24				
