= Kellie Lightbourn =

American model (born 1974)

- Born: December 20, 1974 (age 51); Fort Lauderdale, Florida, U.S.
- Education: Juris Doctor
- Occupation: Model
- Title: Talk Show Host, Consumer Update
- Website: http://www.KellieLightbourn.com

Kellie Lightbourn (born December 20, 1974, in Ft. Lauderdale, Florida) is an American model. She is the host of ABC Action News’ Consumer Update. Previously, she worked as a legal correspondent, anchor, and reporter for WFTS-TV. She has been featured on shows like E! Entertainment, Designing Spaces, Maury, and Extra.

Lightbourn previously held the title of Mrs. Florida United States 2009 and was 3rd runner-up to Mrs. United States 2009. In 1999, she also held the title of Miss Virginia USA and was a finalist in the nationally televised Miss USA pageant. Kellie won the Matrix Style Award.

On May 16, 2010, Lightbourn won the Mrs. Florida America 2010 pageant. She competed in the Mrs. America 2011 pageant, which was held in September 2010 in Tucson, Arizona. She placed in the Top 12.
