= Sylvia Hitchcock =

American model (1946–2015)

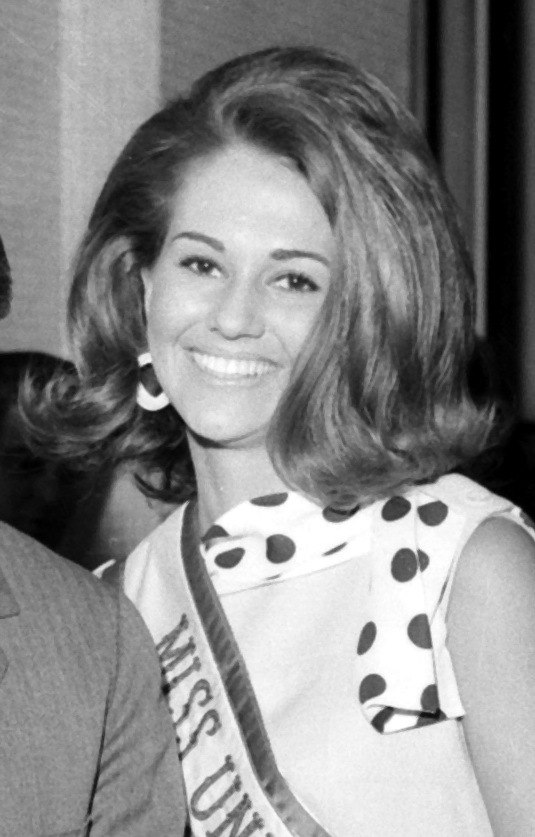
- Hitchcock in 1967
- Born: Sylvia Louise Hitchcock; January 31, 1946; Haverhill, Massachusetts, U.S.
- Died: August 16, 2015 (aged 69); Miami, Florida, U.S.
- Other name: Sylvia Carson
- Education: Miami-Dade Junior College; University of Alabama
- Height: 1.70 m (5 ft 7 in)
- Spouse: William Carson (m. 1970)
- Children: 3
- Beauty pageant titleholder
- Title: Miss Alabama USA 1967; Miss USA 1967; Miss Universe 1967
- Hair color: Brown
- Eye color: Brown
- Major competitions: Miss Alabama USA 1967 (Winner); Miss USA 1967 (Winner); Miss Universe 1967 (Winner)

Sylvia Louise Hitchcock-Carson (January 31, 1946 – August 16, 2015) was an American model and beauty queen who held the title of Miss Alabama USA, Miss USA, and was crowned Miss Universe 1967.

== Personal life ==
Hitchcock was born in Haverhill, Massachusetts and grew up on a chicken farm in Miami, Florida. She attended Miami Palmetto High School, Miami-Dade Junior College and studied art at the University of Alabama. A junior at the university when she won the Miss USA title, Hitchcock chose not to complete her degree. She was a member of Chi Omega sorority.

Hitchcock married William Carson, the inventor of a fruit harvesting machine, in 1970. They had three children, Jonathan, Christianne, and Will, and seven grandchildren.

== Career ==
Hitchcock, who had previously competed in local pageants in Florida, represented Alabama at the Miss USA 1967 pageant. She was chosen as one of the fifteen best in swimsuit and won the Miss USA title on May 22. In July she became the first Miss USA to win the Miss Universe title since Linda Bement in 1960.

Hitchcock also appeared in the 1968 Indianapolis 500 on May 30, 1968.

After relinquishing her title she tried modeling in New York City but became disillusioned with the city and returned to Miami where she worked for a television station. In 1972 she was one of a panel of twelve judges for the Miss Universe 1972 pageant won by Kerry Anne Wells.

== Death ==
She resided in Lake Wales, Florida until her death from cancer on August 16, 2015. She was 69 years old.

Awards and achievements
Preceded by (Sweden) Margareta Arvidsson	Miss Universe; 1967	Succeeded by (Brazil) Martha Vasconcellos
Preceded by Maria Remenyi	Miss USA; 1967	Succeeded by Cheryl Patton
Preceded by Claudia Robinson	Miss Alabama USA; 1967	Succeeded by Susan Scott
