= Katherine Webb =

American model, beauty queen and TV personality

Katherine Webb-McCarron
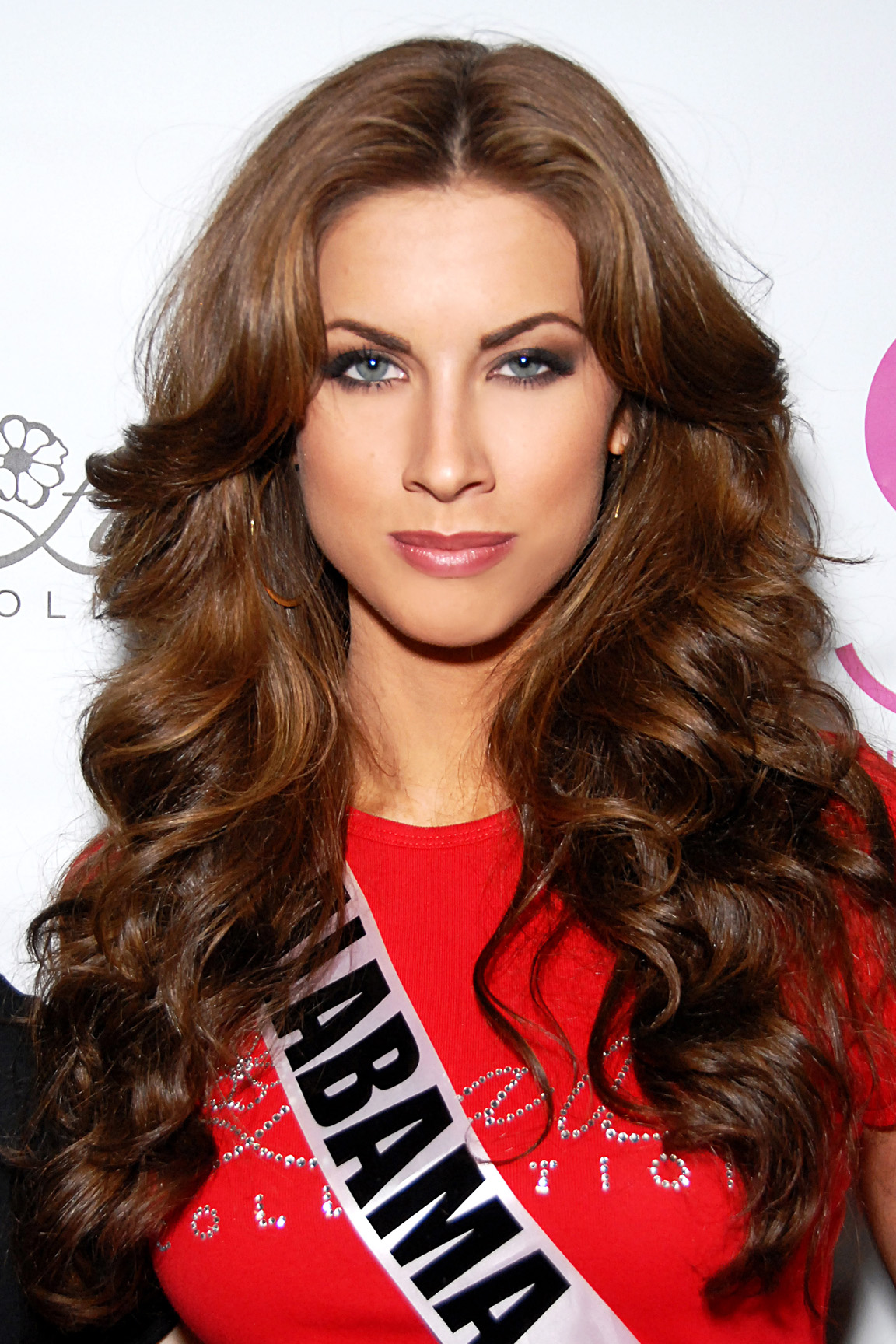
- Webb in Paradise, Nevada on May 28, 2012
- Born: Katherine Elizabeth Webb; April 24, 1989 (age 37); Montgomery, Alabama, U.S.
- Other name: Katherine McCarron
- Education: Auburn University
- Spouse: A. J. McCarron (m. 2014)
- Children: 3
- Beauty pageant titleholder
- Title: Miss Alabama USA 2012
- Hair color: Brunette
- Eye color: Blue-green
- Major competitions: Miss Georgia USA 2008 (Top 15); Miss Alabama USA 2012 (Winner); Miss USA 2012 (Top 10)

Katherine Elizabeth Webb-McCarron (born April 24, 1989), is an American model, beauty queen, and television personality. She was Miss Alabama USA 2012.

== Early life ==
Katherine Webb was born in Montgomery, Alabama, to Alan and Leslie Webb. She grew up in Phenix City, Alabama and Columbus, Georgia.

== Pageant history ==
In 2007, Webb was a semi-finalist in the Miss Georgia USA 2008 pageant. She was crowned Miss Alabama USA in 2012, and then went on to finish in the Top 10 of the Miss USA 2012 competition.

== BCS National Championship Game appearance ==
Webb, who was then the girlfriend (now wife) of Alabama quarterback A. J. McCarron, gained national attention during the 2013 BCS National Championship Game telecast, in which announcer Brent Musburger talked about Webb when the broadcast image centered on her as she sat watching the game in the audience. Musburger referred to her as a "lovely lady" and "beautiful", and remarked to his broadcast partner, former quarterback Kirk Herbstreit, "You quarterbacks get all the good-looking women." Musberger then punctuated his comments exclaiming "Whoa!" and "Wow!" and then remarked that Alabama youngsters should start practicing football in the backyard in order to meet such women in college.

After the game, media coverage of Musburger's remarks on Webb was widespread.

Some of the media coverage of Webb had focused on her being an Auburn University graduate, because of the long Auburn–Alabama sports rivalry. Many media commentators compared Musberger's remarks on Webb to Musberger's earlier remarks on the then-unknown Jenn Sterger at the 2005 Florida State–Miami game; Musberger had pointed out Sterger in the crowd and said "1,500 red-blooded Americans just decided to apply to Florida State", thereby launching Sterger to fame and eventually a career in journalism.

Due to the incident, the number of followers on Webb's Twitter account jumped overnight from about 2,000 to over 175,000. Among her new Twitter followers were NBA star LeBron James, and Webb received messages from NFL defensive end Darnell Dockett and Georgia Bulldogs quarterback Aaron Murray. The next day, the phrase "AJ McCarron girlfriend" was one of Google's highest trending terms, with over 1 million searches. A YouTube video of her appearance in the game has garnered over 3 million views.

Some coverage was critical of Musburger's comments as sexist, and an ESPN spokesperson issued an apology. Webb told Matt Lauer that she was not offended by the remarks and did not feel an apology from ESPN was necessary. "I think the media has been really unfair to [Musburger] ... I think that if he would have said ... that we were hot or sexy or made any derogatory statements like that, I think that would have been a little bit different. But the fact that he said we were beautiful and gorgeous, I don't see why any woman wouldn't be flattered by that," she added.

The incident was revisited by Brent Musburger himself in 2018 when AJ McCarron was traded by the Buffalo Bills to the Oakland Raiders, the team whose games Musburger would begin calling on radio that year. "Can't wait for the 'beautiful' Mrs. McCarron to join us in Oakland," he posted on Twitter.

== Post-BCS celebrity ==
After coverage of Webb on the BCS National Championship Game catapulted her popularity and sparked mass interest in her, Donald Trump, owner of the Miss USA pageant, offered Webb a position as a Miss USA judge. She accepted an offer from Inside Edition to cover Super Bowl XLVII.

Webb landed a spot as a contestant on Splash, formerly known as Celebrity Diving. She tied for the highest mark in the third week of the competition, but withdrew in the fifth week due to a back injury. She appeared as a model in the 2013 Sports Illustrated Swimsuit Issue.

She withdrew from the public spotlight after her marriage to McCarron, largely seeking more stable employment and a family life without the negative gossip that arose during her time of fame. She spent much of her time operating a residential real estate agency funded by her husband's professional football salary. In January 2025, following her youngest son reaching preschool age and her husband's successful stint with the St. Louis Battlehawks, she granted an extensive interview with the New York Post indicating a desire to return to modeling, acknowledging that not living in New York would make auditioning for such opportunities more difficult but that she would continue to leverage her Instagram following.

== Personal life ==
Webb and A. J. McCarron announced their engagement in March 2014 and were married on July 12, 2014 in Orange Beach, Alabama. She announced on December 8, 2015, that she was four months pregnant with their first son to whom she gave birth in May 2016. In December 2018, Webb gave birth to a second son. In March 2021, Webb gave birth to the couple's third son.

Webb is an Evangelical Christian and is frequently involved in her church. McCarron, her husband, is a Roman Catholic.

Preceded by Madeline Mitchell	Miss Alabama USA; 2012	Succeeded by Mary Margaret McCord
