= Miss USA 1967 =

- Date: May 20, 1967
- Presenters: Bob Barker; June Lockhart
- Venue: Miami Beach, Florida
- Broadcaster: CBS, WTVJ
- Entrants: 51
- Placements: 15
- Winner: Sylvia Hitchcock; Alabama

Miss USA 1967 was the 16th Miss USA pageant, televised live from Miami Beach, Florida, on May 20, 1967, co-hosted by Bob Barker and June Lockhart with Buddy Greco as the special entertainer.

The pageant was won by Sylvia Hitchcock of Alabama, who was crowned by outgoing titleholder Maria Remenyi of California. When she became Miss Universe on July 15, 1967, Hitchcock abdicated her title initially to first runner-up Susan Bradley from California. Bradley refused the title, so the crown went to second runner-up Cheryl Patton from Florida. She was crowned Miss USA on July 16, 1967.

== Results ==
Final results	Contestant
Miss USA 1967	Alabama – Sylvia Hitchcock
1st Runner-Up	California – Susan Bradley
2nd Runner-Up	Florida – Cheryl Patton
3rd Runner-Up	Wisconsin – Jody Bonham
4th Runner-Up	Missouri – Karen Hendrix
Top 15	(Washington, D.C.) District of Columbia – Mira Chudy; Illinois – Beverly Lacek; Maryland – Sandy Cledering; Nevada – Jacqueline Moore; Texas – Bonnie Robinson; Arizona – Judianne Magnusson; Oregon – Maureen Bassett; Pennsylvania – Barbara Woronko; Tennessee – Nancy Brackhahn; Virginia – Elizabeth Kallmyer; Mississippi – Lassie Cooke

== Delegates ==
The Miss USA 1967 delegates were:

- Alabama – Sylvia Hitchcock
- Alaska – Mary Lou Helfrich
- Arizona – Judianne Magnusson
- Arkansas – Katy Wurst
- California - Susan Bradley
- Colorado – Kim Kelly
- Connecticut – Linda Drew
- Delaware – Dianne Judefind
- (Washington, D.C.) District of Columbia – Mira Chudy
- Florida – Cheryl Patton
- (Georgia (U.S. state)) Georgia – Jane Lineberger
- Hawaii – Nancy Banks
- Idaho – Sandra Baldwin
- Illinois – Beverly Lacek
- Indiana – Pamela Talmadge
- Iowa – Kathleen Solt
- Kansas – Regina Wolfe
- Kentucky – Debbie Dibble
- Louisiana – Dianne Mader
- Maine – Marlo Williams
- Maryland – Sandy Cledering
- Massachusetts – Pamela Procter
- Michigan – Sonja Dunson
- Minnesota – Bettyann Brewer
- Mississippi – Lassie Cooke
- Missouri – Karen Hendrix
- Montana – Stevie Lahti
- Nebraska – Cherrie Moore
- Nevada – Jacqueline Moore
- New Hampshire – Jennifer Brown
- New Jersey – Jean Galata
- New Mexico – Clydia Newell
- (New York (state)) New York – Wendy Cox
- North Carolina – Patti Jean Efrom
- North Dakota – Jackie Linder
- Ohio – Phyllis Smith
- Oklahoma – Becky Berry
- Oregon – Maureen Bassett
- Pennsylvania – Barbara Woronko
- Rhode Island – Nancy Giuliano
- South Carolina – Hope Patterson
- South Dakota – Patricia Marshall
- Tennessee – Nancy Brackhahn
- Texas – Bonnie Robinson
- Utah – Marilyn Christiansen
- Vermont – Elaine Farrell
- Virginia – Elizabeth Kallmyer
- (Washington (state)) Washington – Diana Bateman
- West Virginia – Pamela Young
- Wisconsin – Jody Bonham
- Wyoming – Helen Barker

== Judges ==
- Benny Goodman – musician
- George Lindsey – actor, comedian
- Edgar Buchanan – actor
- Hy Gardner – entertainment reporter, columnist
- Bob Lardine – feature writer
- Ben Novack – hotelier
- Eileen Ford – co-founder of the Ford Agency
- Beatrice Birginal – fashion designer
- Jack Kruschen – actor
