= Mrs. America (contest) =

American beauty pageant

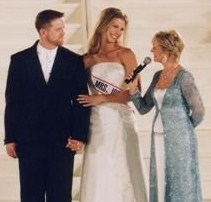
Mrs. America 2005 host with the Iowa representative

Mrs. America Pageant is a beauty competition that was established to honor married women throughout the United States of America. Each of the contestants representing the 50 states and the District of Columbia ranges in age from their 20s to 50s and earns the right to participate in the national event by winning her state competition. These state events are under the direction of Mrs. America state directors. The winner goes on to compete in the Mrs. World pageant.

Mrs. America, Inc., celebrated its 45th anniversary in 2021. The pageant has been televised on networks including PAX and WE (Women's Entertainment); in May 2011, it was carried by the My Family TV network.

On August 29, 2014, the pageant was held in Loews Ventana Canyon Resort in Tucson, Arizona. The pageant moved to its original pageant home, Las Vegas - Westgate Resort, Hotel and Casino. The pageant continues to be held in Las Vegas yearly.

During the 2014 pageant, Mrs. America, Inc., announced that it would be participating in a joint Russian-American contest to be held in Sevastopol, Crimea. This has caused some controversy, since Crimea is recognized by most countries in the world as Ukrainian territory that has been annexed by Russia. The 2015 joint pageant was supposed to mark the 25th anniversary of a joint U.S.-Soviet Mrs. America contest held in Moscow in 1989 to foster good will between the two countries; however, organizers announced that due to the devaluation of the ruble against the American dollar, the pageant would have to find a new site.

The Mrs. America 2026 Pageant was held on September 3, 2026, in Las Vegas, Nevada. Qadra Evans of Montana was crowned.

== Events ==
1955: Ramona Deitemeyer, Mrs. America 1955, appeared on What's My Line?.

1993: Verna Martin, Mrs. District of Columbia, on Wednesday, May 12, 1993, the designation of Mrs. Washington, DC – America 1993 was conferred upon Verna Martin by the Mrs. America Pageant selection committee. She was the first African American contestant to win Mrs. Washington, DC title..

2004: Traci Clemens, Mrs. Rhode Island, competed while six months pregnant with twins. She was the first visibly pregnant woman to compete in the nationally televised event. Traci Clemens is also the first African American contestant to win the Mrs. Rhode Island title.

== Titleholders ==
Titleholders are designated by year of title/reign; competitions are held the preceding fall.

Title Year	Name	State	Placement at Mrs. World	Notes
1977	Ruth Johnson	California	N/A	
1978	Cindy Roberts	Alaska	N/A	
1979	Carrie Gabriel Strom	New Jersey	N/A	
1980	Carol Anne McEwen	Texas	N/A	
1981	Paddy Boyd Argovitz	Louisiana	N/A	
1982	Rhonda McGeeney	Texas	N/A	
1983	Susan Goodman	Tennessee	N/A	
1984	Deborah Wolfe	West Virginia	1st runner-up	Mother of Miss West Virginia Teen USA 2004 Mary Ellen Wolfe, and made top 10 in Miss America 1980
1985	Donna Russell	Mississippi	3rd runner-up	
1986	Cynthia Amann	Florida	4th runner-up	
1987	Pamela Nail	Mississippi	Mrs. World	
1987	Suzy Katz	California	N/A	Originally 1st runner-up to Pamela Nail in 1987, ascended to Mrs. America when Pamela Nail won Mrs. World
1988	Jennifer Kline	Minnesota	2nd runner-up	
1989	Jennifer Johnson	Oklahoma	N/A	
1990	No Mrs. America representative that year			
1991	Kristianna Nichols	Indiana	N/A	
1992	Dr. Doris Martineaux Dalton	Pennsylvania	N/A	
1993	Keyna Baucom	North Carolina	N/A	
1994	Wendy Lewis	Texas	N/A	
1995	Kimberly Brasher	Oklahoma	2nd runner-up	
1996	Cynthia Pensiero	Ohio	N/A	
1997	Lisa Lilenthal	(New York (state)) New York	N/A	
1998	Renee Cairns	Florida	N/A	
1999	Starla Stanley	Utah	Mrs. World	
1999	Stacy Willis	Alabama	N/A	Originally 1st runner-up, ascended to title when Starla Stanley won Mrs. World
2000	Leslie Lam	Hawaii	Top 10	
2001	Nicole Brink	Indiana	Mrs. World	Previously Miss Indiana Teen USA 1992 (semifinalist in Miss Teen USA 1992) and Miss Indiana USA 1998 under her maiden name, Nicole Llewellyn.
2001	Laurett Ellsworth Arenz	Virginia	N/A	Originally 1st runner-up, ascended to title when Nicole Brink won Mrs. World. Went on to host a national financial radio program: HERO'S Talk Radio, Freedom Financial Network and write an award-winning book: The RAFT Strategy: How to Build Your Tax-Free Nest Egg Without Risk
2002	Kristi Phillips	Alabama	3rd runner up	Was Mrs. America, Mrs. Congeniality and the TRIMSPA Dream Body Winner.
2003	Heidi Dinan	Missouri	N/A	
2004	Julie Love-Templeton	Alabama	3rd runner up	
2005	Andrea Pruess	California	Top 12	Previously Miss Virginia Teen USA 1992 & Miss Virginia 1995 (dethroned) under her maiden name, Andrea Ballengee. Mrs. United States 2003. Filmed for television at the Palm Springs Riviera Resort & Racquet Club in Palm Springs, California
2006	Diane Tucker	Arizona	Mrs. World	
2006	Marney Duckworth	Colorado	N/A	Originally 1st runner-up, ascended to title when Diane Tucker won Mrs. World. Previously Miss Nebraska Teen USA 1992 under her maiden name Marney Monson went on to become a published author in spring 2021
2007	Kelly McBee	Wyoming	Top 10	
2008	Maureen McDonald	North Carolina	N/A	
2009	Andrea Robertson	Missouri	1st runner-up	
2010	Shelley Carbone	Connecticut	N/A	
2011	April Lufriu	Florida	Mrs. World	First-generation American (parents from Honduras)
2011	Lara Leimana Fonoimoana	Hawaii	N/A	Originally 1st runner-up, ascended to title when April Lufriu won Mrs. World
2012	Vicki Sarber	Alaska	N/A	Formerly Miss Alaska American Coed 1992-Placed 2nd Runner-Up at National Competition in Honolulu, Hawaii. 1990 Miss Alaska Teen of the Year. Placed 1st Runner Up at National Competition in New Orleans, La.
2013	Austen (Brown) Williams	Texas	N/A	Previously Miss South Carolina Teen USA 2002 (Miss Congeniality) Replaced at Mrs. World by her 1st runner-up
2013	Kaley Sparling	Idaho	Mrs. World	Named 1st runner-up in 2013 Mrs. America pageant Replaced Williams at Mrs. World 2013 pageant by invitation of the national office
2014	Michelle Nicole Evans	Oklahoma	Top 11	
2015	Madeline (Mitchell) Gwin	Alabama	3rd runner-up	Former Miss Alabama USA 2011 and 2nd runner up for Miss USA 2011
2016	Natalie Luttmer	(Washington (state)) Washington	Top 10	
2017	Mekayla (Diehl) Eppers	Indiana	Top 12	Former Miss Indiana USA 2014 and top 20 at Miss USA 2014
2018	Nicole (Rash) Cook	Illinois	Top 6	Former Miss Indiana 2007 and 1st runner-up at Miss America 2008 pageant; Former Ms. Missouri 2012 and Ms. America 2012; also competed as Mrs. Illinois at Mrs. America 2014
2019	Natalie Winslow	Nevada	Top 20	
2020	Brooklyn Rivera	Texas	Top 15	Eventually competed on Big Brother 26.
2021	Jackie Blankenship	Michigan	N/A	
2022	Nicole La Ha Zwiercan	Illinois	Top 6	Elected to the Illinois House of Representatives in 2022
2023	Regina Stock	Texas	Top 6	
2024	Hannah Wise	Tennessee	Top 17	
2025	Paige (Armstrong) Ewing	(Georgia (U.S. state)) Georgia	1st runner-up	
2026	Qadra Evans	Montana	TBD	

== Crossovers ==
Some contestants in the Mrs. America pageant have previously held state pageant titles in the Miss USA, Miss America, Mrs. United States, and Miss Teen USA pageants. They include:

- Mrs. Delaware 1985 - Debi Teed Fenimore (née Dow) - Miss Delaware National Teenager 1972
- Mrs. Hawaii 1991- Julie Larson-Taylor- Miss Hawaii USA 1989 and Miss Utah US Teen 1985
- Mrs. North Carolina 1997 - Janice McQueen Ward - Mrs. United States 1999
- Mrs. Texas 1999 - Edrienne (Carpenter) Edwards - Mrs. United States 2004, Mrs. Texas United States 2004, Miss Utah for America Strong 2021
- Mrs. Indiana 2000 & Mrs. America 2001 - Nicole (Llewellyn) Brink - Miss Indiana Teen USA 1992 & Miss Indiana USA 1998
- Mrs. South Carolina 2013-Jennifer Loveday-Donovan-Mrs South Carolina United States 2010 (Top 15 at Mrs United States)-Miss South Carolina United States 2004 (1st Runner-up Miss United States)-Miss South Carolina Teen United States 1999
- Mrs. Virginia 2001 & Mrs. America 2002 - Laurett Ellsworth Arenz - Mrs. Virginia United States & Mrs. United States 1997
- Mrs. Pennsylvania 2001 - Dr. Lori Sundberg - Mrs. Pennsylvania International 1999, Mrs. Pennsylvania United States 2000 & Mrs. District of Columbia United States 2014
- Mrs. Colorado 2002 - Emily (Weeks) Stark - Miss Colorado USA 1995
- Mrs. Arizona 2004 - Britt (Powell) Boyse - Miss Missouri USA 1995 - Top 12 Miss USA 1995
- Mrs. Idaho 2004 - Amanda (Greenway) Peterson - Miss Idaho Teen USA 1992
- Mrs. Iowa 2004 - Jamie (Solinger) Patterson - Miss Iowa Teen USA 1992 - Miss Teen USA 1992, & Miss Iowa USA 1998
- Mrs. Kansas 2004 - Kimberlee (Girrens) Easter - Miss Kansas Teen USA 1986 & Miss Kansas USA 1992
- Mrs. Maryland 2004 - Nikki Karl - Mrs. Maryland International 2003
- Mrs. Massachusetts 2004 - Claire (DeSimone) O'Connor - Miss Rhode Island USA 1999
- Mrs. Minnesota 2004 - Melissa (Hall) Young - Miss Minnesota USA 1997
- Mrs. New Hampshire 2004 - Stephanie (Foisy) Mills - Miss New Hampshire 1995
- Mrs. Texas 2004 - Jennifer (Craig) Palmieri - Miss Georgia USA 1996
- Mrs. West Virginia 2004 - Amanda (Burns) Duffy - Miss West Virginia Teen USA 1997 & Miss West Virginia USA 1999
- Mrs. Pennsylvania 2005 - Kandace Gary - Mrs. Pennsylvania United States 2002
- Mrs. South Carolina 2005 - Angela Hughes-Singleton - Miss South Carolina 1996
- Mrs. California 2005 & Mrs. America 2006 - Andrea (Ballengee) Preuss - Miss Virginia Teen USA 1992 - Miss Virginia 1995 (dethroned) - Mrs. United States 2003
- Mrs. Maine 2006 - Heather (Coutts) Clark - Miss Maine USA 1999
- Mrs. Minnesota 2006 - Holly (Henderson) Ernst - Mrs. Minnesota International 2003, Mrs. Minnesota United States 2009/2002, Miss Wisconsin World America 1993, Miss Wisconsin U.S. Teen 1990 - Miss Junior Wisconsin 1989
- Mrs. New Hampshire 2006 - Jessica Plante - Mrs. Massachusetts International 2008, (Top 10 at Mrs. International 2008), Mrs. Massachusetts United States 2016
- Mrs. Florida 2007 - Jamie Converse-Estrada - Miss Florida USA 1998
- Mrs. Illinois 2007 - Hallie (Bonnell) Thompson - Miss Ohio USA 1987
- Mrs. Maryland 2007 - Adrienne Watson Carver - Mrs. Maryland United States 2006
- Mrs. North Carolina 2007 - Kathryn Hancock-Stuart - Miss South Carolina Teen USA 1990
- Mrs. Oregon 2007 - Kimberly (Stubblefield) Takla - Miss Oregon USA 1986
- Mrs. Pennsylvania 2007 - Allison Dalcamo - Mrs. Pennsylvania United States 2005
- Mrs. Tennessee 2007 - Christina (Lam) Ryan - Miss Illinois USA 1999
- Mrs. Utah 2007 - Heather (Henderson) Osmond - Miss Utah Teen USA 1994
- Mrs. Florida 2008 - Jaclyn (Nesheiwat) Stapp - Miss New York USA 2004
- Mrs. Michigan 2008 - Sara Dusendang-Moylan - Miss Michigan Teen USA 1999
- Mrs. Connecticut 2009 - Melanie (Mudry) Varian - Miss Connecticut USA 2007
- Mrs. District of Columbia 2009 - Deanna McCray James - Mrs. Maryland United States 2005
- Mrs. Massachusetts 2009 - Rosalie Allain-Morris - Miss Massachusetts USA 2000
- Mrs. Missouri 2009 & Mrs. America 2010 - Andrea Robertson (Mrs. Missouri United States 2002)
- Mrs. Pennsylvania 2009 - Joyelle Scavone - Mrs. Pennsylvania United States 2006
- Mrs. Vermont 2009 - Jennifer (Ripley) Bisson - Miss Vermont Teen USA 1999 & Miss Vermont USA 2003
- Mrs. Arizona 2010 - Corrie (Hill) Francis - Miss Arizona 2003
- Mrs. Colorado 2010 - Shalon (Pecosky) Polson - Miss Colorado Teen USA 1990
- Mrs. District of Columbia 2010 - Regena Robinson - Mrs. Maryland United States 2008
- Mrs. Florida 2010 - Kellie Lightbourn - Miss Virginia USA 1999
- Mrs. Hawaii 2010 - Alicia Michioka-Jones - Miss Hawaii USA 2003 - Top 10 Miss USA 2003
- Mrs. Michigan 2010 - Stephanie Hunt - Miss United Teenager 1982 - Mrs. United States 2007
- Mrs. New York 2010 - Meaghan (Jarensky) Castaldi - Miss New York USA 2005 - Top 10 Miss USA 2005
- Mrs. Texas 2010 - Shannon (Schambeau) Patterson - Miss District of Columbia 2005 - 4th Runner Up Miss America 2005
- Mrs. Ohio 2011 - Melanie (Murphy) Miller - Miss Ohio 2006
- Mrs. Alaska 2012 - Vicki Sarber - Miss Alaska American Coed 1992 - 2nd Runner Up Miss American Coed 1992 - Miss Alaska Teen of the Year 1990 - 1st Runner Up Miss Teen of the Year 1990
- Mrs. Pennsylvania 2012 - Susan Huntley - Mrs. Pennsylvania United States 2010, Mrs. Pennsylvania International 2008
- Mrs. Texas 2013 - Austen (Brown) Williams - Miss South Carolina Teen USA 2002 - Miss Congeniality Miss Teen USA 2002
- Mrs. Delaware 2013 - Christine Rich - Mrs. Delaware United States 2015 - Top 15 Mrs. United States 2015, Mrs. USA Earth 2022
- Mrs. Illinois 2013 - Stephanie (Daughenbaugh) Piller - Ms. Galaxy International 2010
- Mrs. Illinois 2014/Mrs. Illinois 2018 & Mrs. America 2019 - Nicole (Rash) Cook - Miss Indiana 2007 - 1st Runner Up Miss America 2008
- Mrs. Massachusetts 2014- Monique (Jones) Taylor- Miss Massachusetts Teen USA 2000- Ms. Massachusetts United States 2012- 1st Runner Up Ms. United States 2012
- Mrs. Alabama 2015 - Madeilne (Mitchell) Gwin - Miss Alabama USA 2011 - 2nd Runner Up Miss USA 2011
- Mrs. Colorado 2015 - Mette (Boving) Castor - Miss Louisiana 1997 - Top 10 Miss America 1998
- Mrs. Iowa 2015 - Jessica (Lawrence) Gardner - Miss South Dakota USA 2003
- Mrs. Maryland 2015 - Su Joing (Drakeford) Sollers - Miss Nebraska USA 2001
- Mrs. New Jersey 2015 - Erin (Abrahamson) Molinaro - Miss New Jersey USA 2007 - Miss New Jersey Teen USA 2001
- Mrs. Pennsylvania 2015 - Kate Schartel Novak - Mrs. Pennsylvania United States 2011 - Mrs. Pennsylvania International 2019
- Mrs. Texas 2015 - Melissa Pocza - Mrs. Texas America 2009 - Mrs. Texas United States 2011 - 3rd Runner Up Mrs. United States 2011 - Mrs. Michigan International - Mrs. International 2017
- Mrs. Idaho 2016 - Christi (Weible) van Ravenhorst - Miss Idaho 2001
- Mrs. Georgia 2016 - Onica (Williams) Blaize - Miss Guyana USA 1995
- Mrs. Montana 2016 - Casey McLain Proban - Miss California Teen USA 2001 - Top 10 Miss Teen USA 2001
- Mrs. Indiana 2017 - Mekayla (Diehl) Eppers - Miss Indiana USA 2014 - Top 20 Miss USA 2014
- Mrs. Idaho 2018 - Kimberly (Weible) Zweiger - Miss Idaho USA 2004 - Top 10 Miss USA 2004
- Mrs. South Carolina 2018 - Anna (Hanks) Hewitt - Miss South Carolina USA 2003 - Top 10 Miss USA 2003
- Mrs. Iowa 2026 - Nicole Winke Gentes - Mrs. Iowa United States 2023 - Mrs. Iowa American 2021

== Forerunner pageant ==
Prior to the active Mrs. America pageant, there was an earlier pageant of the same name. The pageant was created by public relations executive Bert Nevins in 1936 as a promotion for his client, Palisades Amusement Park. When Nevins sold the pageant in 1963, it was the only nationally televised beauty pageant for married women.

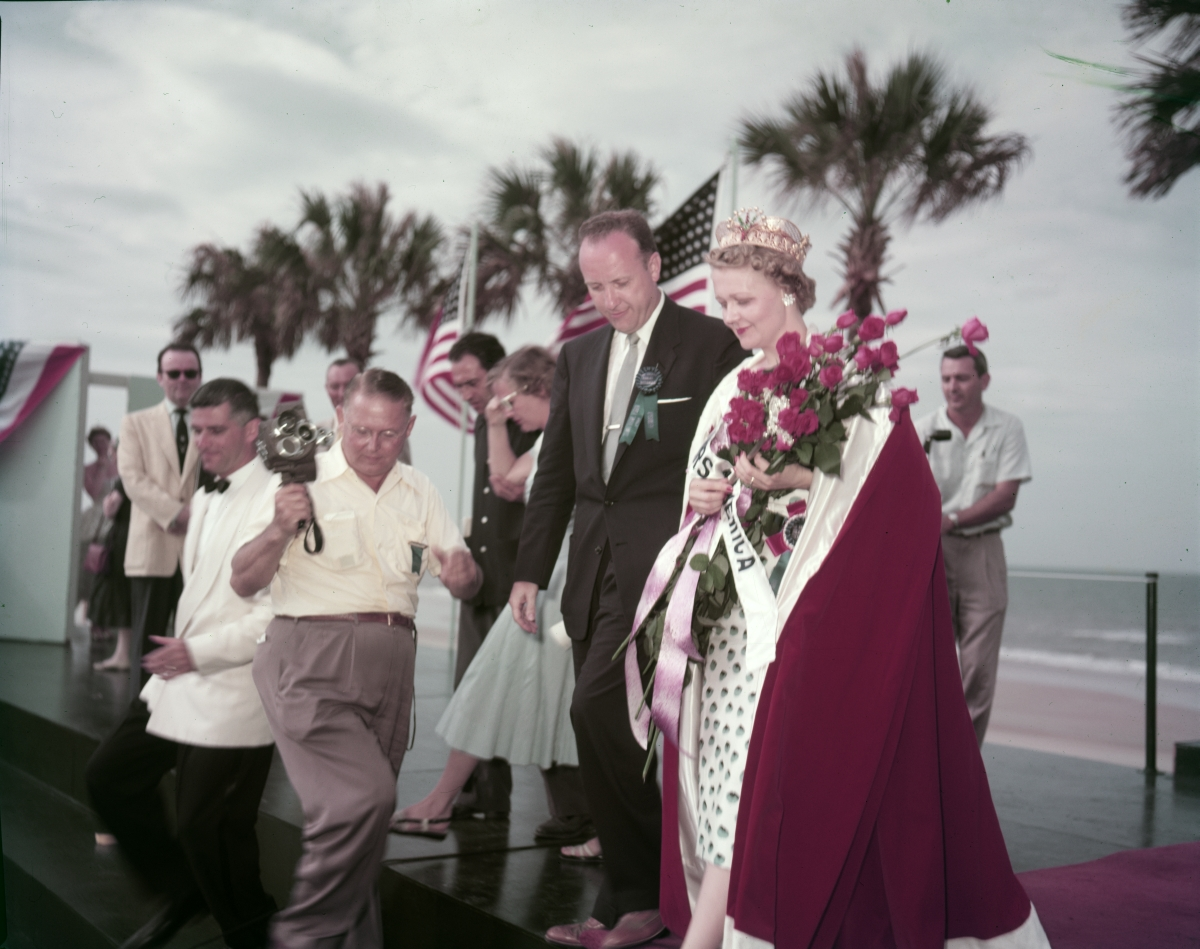
Mrs. America 1956, Ramona Deitemeyer

By 1964, participants were graded on cooking, sewing, ironing, party preparation and other homemaking abilities, family psychology, grooming, poise, personality, and general attractiveness. Winners included:
Source: online newspaper archives

- 1938: Margaret Chamberlain, Ohio (appeared on Family Feud in 1980)
- 1939: Theresa Papp, New Jersey
- 1940: Evelyn Schmitt, New Jersey
- 1941: Ruth Licklider, New York
- 1942: Peggie Diehl, Minnesota
- 1943–46: no pageant (World War II)
- 1947: Janice Pollock, Ohio; then Fredda Acker, South Carolina (after Pollock abdicated)
- 1948: Maria Strohmeier, Pennsylvania
- 1949: Frances Cloyd, California
- 1950: Betty McAllister, Pennsylvania
- 1951: Penny Duncan, New York City
- 1952: Peggy Creel, Florida
- 1953: Evelyn Joyce Schenk, New Jersey
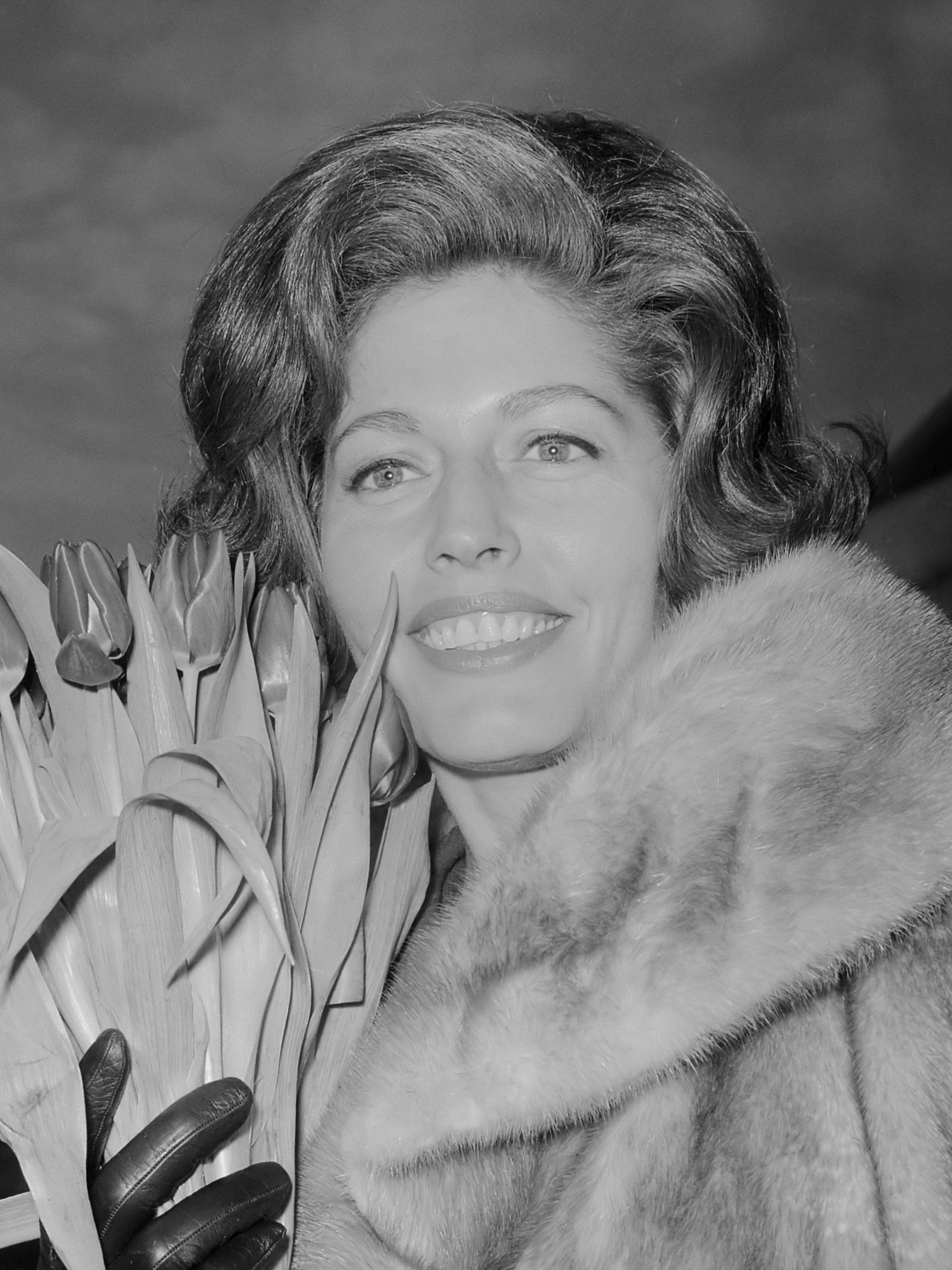
  1965 winner Alice Buehner in 1966
- 1954: Erna Snyder, Pennsylvania
- 1955: Wanda Jennings, Missouri
- 1956: Ramona Deitemeyer, Nebraska Nebraska (appeared on What's My Line May 22, 1955)
- 1957: Cleo Maletis, Oregon
- 1958: Lynwood Finley, District of Columbia
- 1959: Helen Giesse, Ohio
- 1960: Margaret Priebe, Iowa
- 1961: Mrs. Rosemary Murphy, Indiana
- 1962: Lila Masson, Michigan
- 1963: Marilyn Mitchell, California
- 1964: Desree Jenkins, South Carolina
- 1965: Alice Buehner, Utah
- 1966: Joy Noufer, Texas
- 1967: Marlene Cochran, Kansas
- 1968: Joan Fisher, Utah
- 1969:

== Hosts ==
- Bobby Van
- Richard Dawson
- Florence Henderson
- Christopher Knight
- Alan Thicke
