= Miss Alabama's Teen =

- Formation: 2002
- Type: Beauty pageant
- Headquarters: Alabaster
- Location: Alabama
- Members: Miss America's Teen
- Official language: English
- Key people: Anita Walker (Director)
- Website: Official website

The Miss Alabama's Teen competition is the pageant that selects the representative for the U.S. state of Alabama in the Miss America's Teen pageant.

Jessica Baeder of Auburn, Alabama was the first contestant from Alabama to win the national title on July 29, 2017.

Grier Feldman of Sterrett was crowned Miss Alabama's Teen on March 8, 2026, at Thompson High School in Alabaster, Alabama. She competed for the title of Miss America's Teen 2027 on September 5, 2026, at the Kravis Center for the Performing Arts in West Palm Beach, Florida.

In January 2023, the official name of the pageant was changed from Miss Alabama’s Outstanding Teen, to Miss Alabama’s Teen, in accordance with the national pageant.

== Results summary ==
The year in parentheses indicates the year of the Miss America's Teen competition the award/placement was garnered.

=== Placements ===
- Miss America's Teen: Jessica Baeder (2018), Marcelle LeBlanc (2022)
- 1st runners-up: Scarlett Walker (2011), Ali Mims (2025)
- 2nd runners-up: Mi'a Callens (2012), Jessica Procter (2014), Morgan Green (2015)
- 3rd runners-up: Collins McMurray (2019)
- Top 10: Jenna Bryant (2006), Abby Lynn Steverson (2007)
- Top 11: Tiara Pennington (2017)
- Top 15: Zoé Champion (2020)

=== Awards ===
==== Preliminary awards ====
- Preliminary Evening Wear/On Stage Question: Jessica Procter (2014), Morgan Green (2015), Zoé Champion (2020)
- Preliminary Evening Gown Award: Ali Mims (2025)
- Preliminary Lifestyle and Fitness: Jessica Procter (2014)
- Preliminary Talent: Scarlett Walker (2011), Mi'a Callens (2012), Jessica Baeder (2018), Marcelle LeBlanc (2022), Elaina Burt (2024)

==== Non-finalist awards ====
- Non-finalist Talent: Haley Ates (2009)

==== Other awards ====
- Miss Congeniality/Spirit of America: Zoé Champion (2020)
- Outstanding Dance Award: Jessica Baeder (2018)
- Scholastic Excellence Award: Collins McMurray (2019)
- Teens in Action Award: Jessica Baeder (2018), Hailey Adams (2023)
- Teens in Action Finalists: Marcelle LeBlanc (2022)
- Top Interview Award: Marcelle LeBlanc (2022)

== Winners ==
- Declared as winner
- Ended as a runner-up
- Ended as a finalist or semi-finalist

Year	Name	Hometown	Age	Local Title	Talent	Placement at MAO Teen	Special scholarships at MAO Teen	Notes
2026	Grier Feldman	Sterrett	18	Miss Hoover's Teen	Dance/Twirl, "At World's End"			
2025	Addison Shoemaker	Vestavia Hills	16	Miss Historic Springville's Teen	Lyrical Dance, "Humble and Kind"			
2024	Ali Mims	Harpersville	17	Miss Hoover's Teen	Opera, "O Mio Babbino Caro"	1st Runner-Up	Preliminary Evening Gown Award	Miss Hoover 2026
2023	Elaina Burt	Hoover	17	Miss Jefferson County's Teen	Ballet en Pointe		Preliminary Talent Award	Third Runner Up at Miss Alabama 2026
2022	Hailey Adams	Birmingham	16	Miss Cahaba Valley's Outstanding Teen	Dance, "Proud Mary"		Teens in Action Winner	Miss University of Alabama 2026. Younger sister of Miss Florida's Outstanding Teen 2019-2020, Hannah Adams
2020–21 (Note: State competition took place in 2020, as national pageant postponed to 2021 for the 2022 edition due to the COVID-19 pandemic.)	Emma Terry	Leeds	18	Miss Leeds Area's Outstanding Teen 2020	Ballet en Pointe, "GiGi Medley"	Did not compete; 1st runner-up at Miss Alabama's Outstanding Teen 2020, later assumed title after LeBlanc won Miss America's Outstanding Teen 2022		1st runner-up to Miss Alabama 2024 Abbie Stockard, who later became Miss America 2025. Miss Alabama 2025 and 4th runner-up at Miss America 2026.
2020–21	Marcelle LeBlanc	Birmingham	16	Miss Coosa Valley’s Outstanding Teen	Vocal, “On My Own”	Winner	Teens in Action Finalist Preliminary Talent Award Top Interview Award	Sister of Ava LeBlanc, Miss Alabama Teen USA 2024; Actress featured in Stranger Things season 2, Fear Street Part Two: 1978, Criminal Minds, and Grey's Anatomy
2019	Zoé Champion	Leeds	16	Miss Jefferson County's Outstanding Teen	Jazz Dance, "Lone Ranger"	Top 15	Preliminary Evening Wear/OSQ Award Spirit of America Award	Younger sister of Chandler Champion, Miss Alabama 2013
2018	Collins McMurray	Vestavia Hills	17	Miss Friendliest City's Outstanding Teen	Vocal, "Over the Rainbow"	3rd runner-up	Scholastic Excellence Award	2nd runner-up at Miss Alabama 2021
2017	Lauren Bradford	Gulf Shores	17	Miss Coastal Alabama's Outstanding Teen	Violin, "Orange Blossom Special"	Did not compete; originally 1st runner-up, later assumed title after Baeder won Miss America's Outstanding Teen 2018		3rd runner-up at Miss Alabama 2019. Later Miss Alabama 2021 and 1st runner-up to Miss America 2022.
2017	Jessica Baeder	Auburn	17	Miss Smith Station's Outstanding Teen	Ballet en pointe, "Boogie Woogie Bugle Boy"	Winner	Outstanding Dance Award Preliminary Talent Award Teens in Action Award	Daughter of Miss North Carolina 1984, Francesca Adler
2016	Tiara Pennington	Helena	16	Miss Metropolitan's Outstanding Teen	Vocal, "Patriotic Medley"	Top 11		1st runner-up at Miss Alabama 2018 pageant.Later Miss Alabama 2019and Top 7 at Miss America 2020
2015	Kaitlynn Campbell	Hayden	17	At-Large	Vocal, "Concrete Angel"			
2014	Morgan Green	Tuscaloosa	17	Miss Tuscaloosa's Outstanding Teen	Vocal, "Don't Rain on My Parade" from Funny Girl	2nd runner-up	Preliminary Evening Wear/On Stage Question Award	
2013	Jessica Procter	Tuscaloosa	17	Miss West Central's Outstanding Teen	Broadway Vocal	2nd runner-up	Preliminary Evening Wear/On Stage Question Award Preliminary Lifestyle and Fitness Award	Later Miss Alabama 2017; Top 7 at Miss America 2018 pageant
2012	Callie Walker	Birmingham	14	Miss Point Mallard's Outstanding Teen	Ballet en pointe, "Storms in Africa"			Daughter of Angela Tower Walker, Miss Alabama 1985 Sister of Scarlett Walker, Miss Alabama's Outstanding Teen 2010 Later Miss Alabama 2018; Top 10 at Miss America 2019 pageant
2011	Mi'a Callens	Birmingham	17	Miss Jefferson County's Outstanding Teen	Piano/Vocal, "Hiding Underwater"	2nd runner-up	Preliminary Talent Award	
2010	Scarlett Walker	Birmingham	16	Miss Painted Rock's Outstanding Teen	Dance, "The Way You Make Me Feel"	1st runner-up	Preliminary Talent Award	Daughter of Angela Tower Walker, Miss Alabama 1985 Sister of Callie Walker, Miss Alabama's Outstanding Teen 2012 and Miss Alabama 2018 Later Distinguished Young Woman of Alabama 2012 Cast as an ensemble member in the 2018 Broadway production of Carousel
2009	Avery Cooper	Smiths Station		Miss Teen Chattahoochie Valley				
2008	Haley Ates	Eufaula		Miss Teen Painted Rock	Vocal, "Defying Gravity" from Wicked		Non-finalist Talent Award	
2007	Meg McGuffin	Ozark	14	Miss Teen Trojan/Troy	Dance			Later Miss Alabama 2015; 4th runner-up at Miss America 2016 pageant
2006	Abby Lynn Steverson	Smiths			Ragtime Piano	Top 10		
2005	Jenna Bryant	Hoover	17		Jazz Dance	Top 10		
2004	Whitney Vautier					No national pageant		
2003	Whitney Dykes		17			No national pageant		
