= Madeline Mitchell =

American beauty queen

- Born: Madeline Grace Mitchell; May 17, 1989 (age 37); Russellville, Alabama, U.S.
- Beauty pageant titleholder
- Title: Miss Alabama USA 2011; Mrs. Alabama America 2015; Mrs. America 2015
- Major competitions: Miss Alabama USA 2011 (Winner); Miss USA 2011 (2nd Runner-Up); Mrs. America 2015 (Winner)

Madeline Mitchell Gwin (née Mitchell; born May 17, 1989) is an American beauty pageant titleholder from Russellville, Alabama. She won the title of Miss Alabama USA 2011 and competed in the Miss USA 2011 competition, where she finished as the second runner-up. She later won the Mrs. America 2015 pageant.

== Career ==
Mitchell had previously competed in the 2008 Miss Alabama USA pageant and placed as the second runner-up. She returned one year later and competed in the 2009 Miss Alabama USA competition and only finished Top 15.

Mitchell was named 2nd runner-up at Miss USA 2011 pageant held at Las Vegas on June 19, 2011.

She won the Mrs. America 2015 pageant on March 28.

With her then fiancé Ryan Gwin, Mitchell competed in the first season of Get Out Alive with Bear Grylls which premiered on July 8, 2013 on NBC. The couple finished in 4th place in the penultimate episode.

== Personal life ==
On September 26, 2008, while she was on her way to show her mother her new dress for the 2008 Miss Alabama USA competition, she hit a deer and lost control of her vehicle. The car went into 40-foot (10 m) ravine and caught fire just off of Alabama State Route 13. Walmart truck driver Gary Lewellen extinguished the fire in her car during the accident. She and her boyfriend were trapped, hanging upside down, in the car. She spent 12 days in a coma at the University of Alabama Hospital following the accident and had multiple fractures to her leg, broken ribs, and internal injuries. She spent 21 days on a respirator and two months in a wheelchair. With a femur broken in 12 places and pneumonia, she was at risk of losing not only her leg, but also her life. Although doctors had doubted the possibility, she was able to walk after several months. As of June 2011, she was in the final year of studies at the University of Alabama, where she studied elementary education. On November 7, 2010, as Miss Tuscaloosa, she won the title of Miss Alabama USA at the Bama Theatre in Tuscaloosa.

Her parents are Suzanne and John Mitchell.

Preceded by (Virginia) Samantha Casey	Miss USA 2nd Runner-Up; 2011	Succeeded by (Ohio) Audrey Bolte
Preceded by Audrey Moore	Miss Alabama USA; 2011	Succeeded by Katherine Webb
