= Get Out Alive with Bear Grylls =

2013 American reality competition series

- Developed by: Bear Grylls; Tom Shelly
- Presented by: Bear Grylls
- Judges: Bear Grylls
- Country of origin: United States
- Original language: English
- No. of seasons: 1
- No. of episodes: 8

Production
- Executive producers: Ben Silverman; Bear Grylls; Chris Grant; Laura Caraccioli; Doug McCallie
- Production locations: South Island, New Zealand
- Production companies: Bear Grylls Ventures; Electus

Original release
- Network: NBC
- Release: July 8 – August 26, 2013

Get Out Alive with Bear Grylls is an American reality competition series hosted by adventurer and survivalist Bear Grylls. The eight-episode series premiered on NBC on July 8, 2013.

== Format ==
Ten teams of two compete to survive in the wild of New Zealand with Bear Grylls as their guide. The teams will perform various tasks and missions as they battle unforgiving terrain: high mountains, glaciers, gorges, the rain forest, rivers and rapids. Each week Grylls will eliminate one team, and the last team remaining will win $500,000.

== Contestants ==
=== Season 1 (2013) ===
| Name | Age | Occupation | Residence | Relationship |
|---|---|---|---|---|
| Andrew "Lucky" Larson | 58 | Carpenter | Stillman Valley, Illinois | Father/Daughter |
| Andrea "Louie" Larson | 24 | | Stillman Valley, Illinois | Father/Daughter |
| Chris Winter | 28 | Telecommunication field technician | Dallas, Texas | Friends |
| Jeffrey Powell | 29 | | Dallas, Texas | Friends |
| Austin Vach | 24 | Technical Account Manager | Maple Valley, Washington | Father/Son |
| Jim Vach | 61 | Fraud analyst | Maple Valley, Washington | Father/Son |
| Ryan Gwin | 24 | Technical analyst | Mobile, Alabama | Engaged |
| Madeline Mitchell | 24 | 3rd grade teacher | Mobile, Alabama | Engaged |
| Royce Wadsworth | 25 | Finance/Human resources | West Hollywood, California | Friends |
| Kyle Krieger | 29 | Hairstylist | West Hollywood, California | Friends |
| Wilson Sheppard | 40 | Boat captain | Altadena, California | Married |
| Robin Sheppard | 36 | District sales manager | Altadena, California | Married |
| Canden Bliss Jackson | 23 | On-air Host | Los Angeles, California | Mother/Daughter |
| Donna Nettles Jackson | 51 | | Fairhope, Alabama | Mother/Daughter |
| Alicia Berkwitt | 28 | Entrepreneur | Marina del Ray, California | Dating |
| Spencer Hill | 35 | Bartender/Entrepreneur | Los Angeles, California | Dating |
| Esmeralda Depierro | 25 | Entrepreneur | Miami Beach, Florida | Married |
| Dominic Depierro | 26 | Entrepreneur | Miami Beach, Florida | Married |
| Vanessa Vazquez | 23 | Biology student/Waitress | Chicago, Illinois | Friends |
| Erica Franklin | 24 | Hairstylist | Chicago, Illinois | Friends |

== Summary table ==
Tasks :

Fire: make fire for the whole group.
Food: make sure the whole group gets fed.
Obstacle: make sure all the teams go through the obstacles safely and efficiently.
Shelter: make sure every team has good shelter, and is dry, safe, and warm.

| Place | Contestants | Episodes | | | | | | | |
| Place | Contestants | 1 | 2 | 3 | 4 | 5 | 6 | 7 | 8 |
|---|---|---|---|---|---|---|---|---|---|
| 1 | Lucky & Louie | | | | | LOW | LOW | SAFE | WINNERS |
| 2 | Chris & Jeff | LOW | | SAFE | | LOW | | LOW | RUNNERS UP |
| 2 | Austin & Jim | SAFE | | | SAFE | | SAFE | LOW | RUNNERS UP |
| 4 | Madeline & Ryan | | SAFE | LOW | | | LOW | OUT | |
| 5 | Kyle & Royce | | | | | SAFE | OUT | | |
| 6 | Robin & Wilson | | LOW | LOW | LOW | OUT | | | |
| 7 | Canden & Donna | | LOW | | OUT | | | | |
| 8 | Alicia & Spencer | | | OUT | | | | | |
| 9 | Dominic & Esmeralda | LOW | OUT | | | | | | |
| 10 | Erica & Vanessa | OUT | | | | | | | |

Result:

- Safe: Winners of the challenge, safe from elimination for the week, and win a trip to the feast pit.
- Low: Team judged to be poor performers.
- Out: Team eliminated

== Development and production ==
In October 2012, NBC gave a green-light for the production of eight episodes of the series. Auditions were held in December 2012 and January 2013 in nine cities in the U.S. The series was filmed in the South Island, New Zealand.

== International broadcast ==
Discovery International has purchased the rights to the series, to be aired on Discovery Channel in 218 countries beginning in the third quarter of 2013.

== Series overview ==
| Season | Episodes | Originally released | |
| Season | Episodes | First released | Last released |
|---|---|---|---|
| 1 | 8 | July 8, 2013 | August 26, 2013 |

=== Episodes ===
| No. | Title | Original release date | U.S. viewers (millions) |
|---|---|---|---|
| 1 | "The Wild Is Revealing" | July 8, 2013 | 4.23 |
| 2 | "Living on the Edge" | July 15, 2013 | 3.88 |
| 3 | "Leave No Man Behind" | July 22, 2013 | 3.67 |
| 4 | "The Mountains Will Give You Strength" | July 29, 2013 | 3.76 |
| 5 | "Don't Look Down" | August 5, 2013 | 3.79 |
| 6 | "The Tough Get Going" | August 12, 2013 | 3.71 |
| 7 | "Frozen Planet" | August 19, 2013 | 3.41 |
| 8 | "No Guts, No Glory" | August 26, 2013 | 4.15 |
