= Miss Universe 1967 =

16th Miss Universe pageant

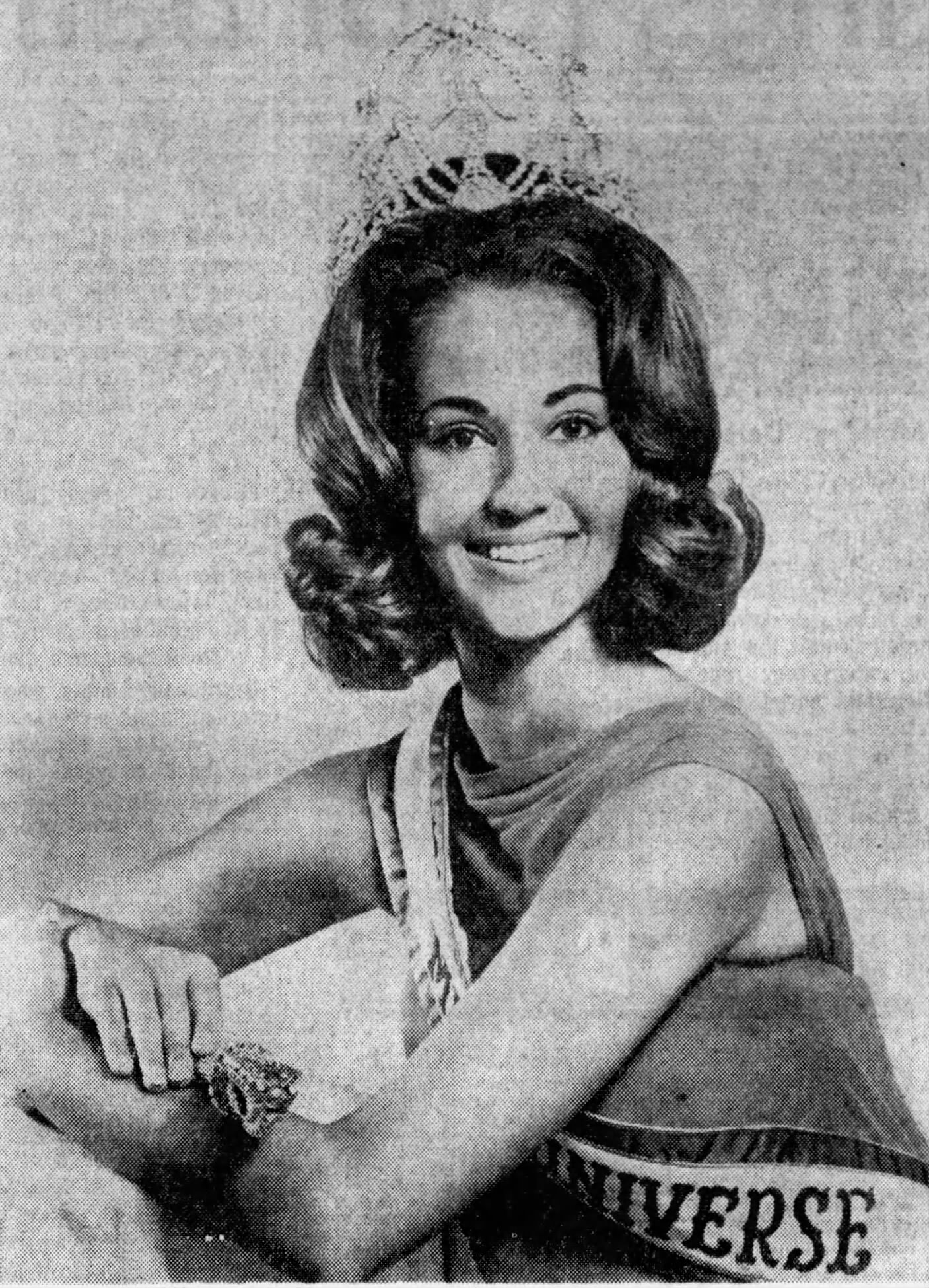
- Sylvia Hitchcock
- Date: 15 July 1967
- Presenters: Bob Barker; June Lockhart
- Entertainment: Jean-Paul Vignon
- Venue: Miami Beach Auditorium, Miami Beach, Florida, United States
- Broadcaster: CBS
- Entrants: 56
- Placements: 15
- Debuts: Bonaire
- Withdrawals: Ceylon; Ecuador; Guyana; Jamaica; Lebanon; Morocco; Suriname; Thailand; Trinidad and Tobago
- Returns: Dominican Republic; Honduras; Hong Kong; Mexico; United States Virgin Islands; Uruguay
- Winner: Sylvia Hitchcock; United States
- Congeniality: Lena McGarvie (Scotland)
- Best National Costume: Carmen Ramasco (Brazil)
- Photogenic: Elia Kalogeraki (Greece)

Miss Universe 1967 was the 16th Miss Universe pageant, held at the Miami Beach Auditorium in Miami Beach, Florida, on 15 July 1967.

At the conclusion of the event, Margareta Arvidsson of Sweden crowned Sylvia Hitchcock of the United States as Miss Universe 1967. It is the fourth victory of the United States in the history of the pageant.

Contestants from fifty-six countries and territories competed in this edition. The pageant was hosted by Bob Barker, while June Lockhart provided commentary throughout the competition. French-American singer Jean-Paul Vignon performed in this year's pageant.

== Background ==
=== Selection of participants ===
Contestants from fifty-six countries and territories were selected to compete in the pageant. One candidate was appointed to represent her country to replace the original dethroned winner.

==== Replacements ====
Miss France 1967, Jeanne Beck, chose not to compete in any international competition and was replaced by her first runner-up, Anne Vernier.

==== Debuts, returns, and withdrawals ====
This edition saw the debut of Bonaire, and the returns of the United States Virgin Islands which last competed in 1962; and the Dominican Republic, Honduras, Hong Kong, and Mexico last competed in 1965.

Miss Ecuador 1967, Laura Baquero Palacios, Miss Morocco 1967, Naima Benjelloun, and Miss Thailand 1967, Prapassorn Panichakula, were all disqualified for not meeting the minimum age requirement. Elham Warwar of Jamaica was not allowed to participate as neither she nor her national sponsor had shown proof she had won a national competition. Ceylon, Lebanon, Suriname, and Trinidad and Tobago withdrew after their respective organizations failed to hold a national competition or appoint a delegate.

Moomba Queen 1967, Patsy Earp, was set to represent Australia but withdrew for undisclosed reasons.

== Results ==
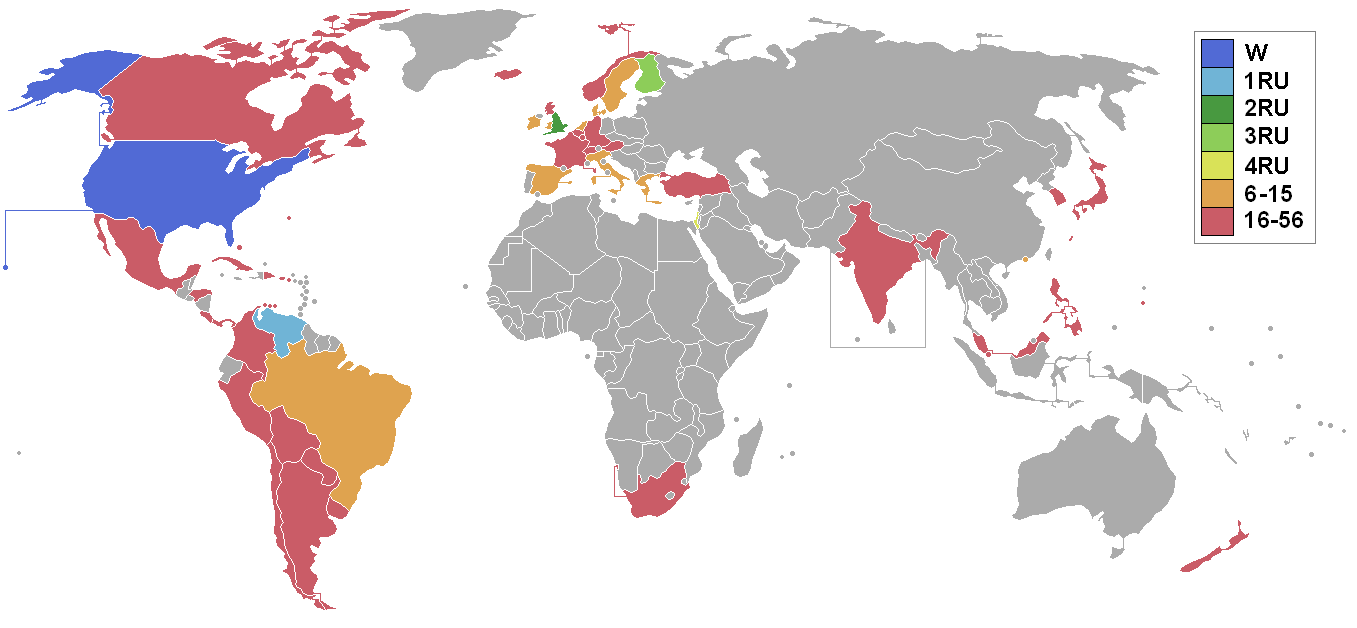
Miss Universe 1967 participating countries and territories

=== Placements ===
Placement	Contestant
Miss Universe 1967	United States – Sylvia Hitchcock
1st Runner-Up	Venezuela – Mariela Pérez
2nd Runner-Up	England – Jennifer Lewis
3rd Runner-Up	Finland – Ritva Lehto
4th Runner-Up	Israel – Batya Kabiri
Top 15	Brazil – Carmen Ramasco; Denmark – Gitte Knudsen; Greece – Elia Kalogeraki; Holland – Irene van Campenhout; Hong Kong – Laura Roque; Ireland – Patricia Armstrong; Italy – Paola Rossi; Spain – Francisca Delgado; Sweden – Eva-Lisa Svensson; Wales – Denise Page

=== Special awards ===
Award	Contestant
Miss Amity	Scotland – Lena McGarvie
Miss Photogenic	Greece – Elia Kalogeraki
Best National Costume	Brazil – Carmen Ramasco
Top 15 Best in Swimsuit	Bolivia – Marcela Montoya; Brazil – Carmen Ramasco; Denmark – Gitte Knudsen; England – Jennifer Lewis; Greece – Elia Kalogeraki; Holland – Irene van Campenhout; Hong Kong – Laura Roque; Israel – Batya Kabiri; Italy – Paola Rossi; Peru – Mirtha Calvo; South Africa – Windley Ballenden; South Korea – Jung-ae Hong; Sweden – Eva-Lisa Svensson; United States – Sylvia Hitchcock; Venezuela – Mariela Pérez

== Pageant ==
=== Format ===
Same with 1966, fifteen semi-finalists were chosen at the preliminary competition that consists of the swimsuit and evening gown competition. Each of the fifteen semi-finalists were individually interviewed by Bob Barker. Following the interviews, the fifteen semi-finalists participated in the swimsuit and evening gown competitions. From fifteen, five contestants were shortlisted to advance to the final interview.

=== Selection committee ===
- Stanley Baker – Welsh actor
- Rossano Brazzi – Italian actor and director
- Edilson Cid Varela – Brazilian journalist
- Yousuf Karsh – Armenian-Canadian photographer
- Mikael Katz – Swedish journalist
- Dong Kingman – Chinese-American painter
- Arthur Murray – American dance instructor
- Toshiro Mifune – Japanese actor
- Earl Wilson – American columnist and journalist
- Gladys Zender – Miss Universe 1957 from Peru

== Contestants ==
Fifty-six contestants competed for the title.

Country/Territory	Contestant	Age (Note: Ages at the time of the pageant)	Hometown
Argentina	Amalia Scuffi	24	Buenos Aires
Aruba	Ivonne Maduro	19	Oranjestad
Austria	Christl Bartu	22	Bludenz
Bahamas	Elizabeth Knowles	18	Nassau
Belgium	Mauricette Sironval	18	Brussels
Bermuda	Cheryl Smith	20	Hamilton
Bolivia	Marcela Montoya	18	Oruro
Bonaire	Cristina Landwier	19	Kralendijk
Brazil	Carmen Ramasco	21	Campinas
Canada	Donna Barker	20	Ontario
Chile	Ingrid Vila	19	Antofagasta
Colombia	Elsa Garrido	18	Popayán
Costa Rica	Rosa Fernández	18	Guanacaste
Cuba	Elina Salavarría	19	Havana
Curaçao	Imelda Thodé	20	Willemstad
Denmark	Gitte Knudsen	20	Copenhagen
Dominican Republic	Jeannette Rey	18	San Francisco de Macorís
England	Jennifer Lewis	20	Leicester
Finland	Ritva Lehto	21	Kangasala
France	Anne Vernier	18	Paris
Greece	Elia Kalogeraki	19	Athens
Guam	Hope Alvarez	18	Sinajana
Holland	Irene van Campenhout	22	The Hague
Honduras	Denia Alvarado	18	Cortés
Hong Kong	Laura Roque	20	Hong Kong
Iceland	Guðrún Pétursdóttir	20	Garðabær
India	Nayyara Mirza	18	Lucknow
Ireland	Patricia Armstrong	19	Dublin
Israel	Batia Kabiri	19	Tel Aviv
Italy	Paola Rossi	21	Veneto
Japan	Kayoko Fujikawa	18	Osaka
Luxembourg	Marie-Josée Mathgen	18	Luxembourg City
Malaysia	Monkam Siprasome	24	Kedah
Mexico	Valentina Duarte	19	Yucatán
New Zealand	Pamela McLeod	18	Christchurch
Norway	Gro Goskor	21	Oslo
Okinawa	Etsuko Okuhira	18	Okinawa
Panama	Mirna Castillero	18	Herrera
Paraguay	María Torres	18	Presidente Hayes
Peru	Mirtha Calvo	19	Callao
Philippines	Pilar Pilapil	18	Cebu
Puerto Rico	Ivonne Coll	19	Fajardo
Scotland	Lena McGarvie	19	Glasgow
Singapore	Bridget Ong	19	Singapore
South Africa	Windley Ballenden	20	Cape Town
South Korea	Jung-ae Hong	20	Seoul
Spain	Francisca Delgado	19	Córdoba
Sweden	Eva-Lisa Svensson	21	Gothenburg
Switzerland	Elsbeth Rüegger	21	Basel-Landschaft
Turkey	Yelda Gürani	18	Istanbul
United States	Sylvia Hitchcock	21	Tuscaloosa
United States Virgin Islands	Gail Garrison	20	Saint Thomas
Uruguay	Mayela Berton	21	Montevideo
Venezuela	Mariela Pérez	21	Caracas
Wales	Denise Page	19	Pontypool
West Germany	Fee von Zitzewitz	23	Kolberg
