= List of Miss USA titleholders =

Miss USA is an American beauty pageant that has been held annually since 1952 to select the entrant from United States in the Miss Universe pageant.

== Titleholders ==
Nine Miss USA winners have gone on to become Miss Universe and are indicated in bold face. Since 1965, a runner-up has been selected to replace any Miss USA titleholder who wins the Miss Universe pageant.

Key

- Declared as winner
- Ended as runner-up
- Ended as one of the finalists or semifinalists

| Year | State | Miss USA | Hometown | Age (Note: Ages at the time of Miss USA) | Placement at Miss Universe |
|---|---|---|---|---|---|
| 1952 | New York | Jackie Loughery | Brooklyn | 22 | **Top 10** |
| 1953 | Illinois | Myrna Hansen | Chicago | 18 | **1st Runner-Up** |
| **1954** | **South Carolina** | **Miriam Stevenson** | **Winnsboro** | **21** | **Miss Universe 1954** |
| 1955 | Vermont | Carlene King Johnson | Rutland | 22 | **Top 15** |
| **1956** | **Iowa** | **Carol Morris** | **Ottumwa** | **20** | **Miss Universe 1956** |
| 1957 | Maryland | Mary Leona Gage | Glen Burnie | 18 | Disqualified (note: was officially announced as Top 15 Semi-Finalist at the time of her disqualification) |
| 1957 | Utah | Charlotte Sheffield | Salt Lake City | 20 | Succeeded Mary Leona Gage as Miss USA 1957 after Gage was dethroned; She competed at Miss World 1957, but was a non-finalist |
| 1958 | Louisiana | Eurlyne Howell | Bossier City | 18 | **3rd Runner-Up** |
| 1959 | California | Terry Lynn Huntingdon | Mount Shasta | 19 | **2nd Runner-Up** |
| **1960** | **Utah** | **Linda Bement** | **Salt Lake City** | **18** | **Miss Universe 1960** |
| 1961 | Louisiana | Sharon Brown | Minden | 18 | **4th Runner-Up** |
| 1962 | Hawaii | Macel Wilson | Honolulu | 19 | **Top 15** |
| 1963 | Illinois | Marite Ozers | Chicago | 19 | **Top 15** |
| 1964 | District of Columbia | Bobbi Johnson | Washington, D.C. | 19 | **Top 15** |
| 1965 | Ohio | Sue Ann Downey | Columbus | 20 | **2nd Runner-Up** |
| 1966 | California | Maria Remenyi | El Cerrito | 21 | **Top 15** |
| **1967** | **Alabama** | **Sylvia Hitchcock** | **Tuscaloosa** | **21** | **Miss Universe 1967** |
| **1967** | Florida | Cheryl Patton | North Miami | 18 | 2nd Runner-Up at Miss USA; Assumed title after 1st Runner-Up Susan Bradley of California declined when Sylvia Hitchcock won Miss Universe |
| 1968 | Washington | Dorothy Anstett | Kirkland | 20 | **4th Runner-Up** |
| 1969 | Virginia | Wendy Dascomb | Danville | 19 | **Top 15** |
| 1970 | Virginia | Deborah Shelton | Norfolk | 20 | **1st Runner-Up** |
| 1971 | Pennsylvania | Michele McDonald | Butler | 18 | **Top 12** |
| 1972 | Hawaii | Tanya Wilson | Honolulu | 22 | **Top 12** |
| 1973 | Illinois | Amanda Jones | Evanston | 22 | **1st Runner-Up** |
| 1974 | Illinois | Karen Morrison | St. Charles | 19 | **Top 12** |
| 1975 | California | Summer Bartholomew | Merced | 23 | **2nd Runner-Up** |
| 1976 | Minnesota | Barbara Peterson | Edina | 22 | Unplaced |
| 1977 | Texas | Kimberly Tomes | Houston | 21 | **Top 12** |
| 1978 | Hawaii | Judi Andersen | Honolulu | 20 | **1st Runner-Up** |
| 1979 | New York | Mary Therese Friel | Rochester | 20 | **Top 12** |
| **1980** | **South Carolina** | **Shawn Weatherly** | **Sumter** | **20** | **Miss Universe 1980** |
| **1980** | Arizona | Jineane Ford | Gilbert | 20 | 1st Runner-Up at Miss USA; Assumed title when Shawn Weatherly won Miss Universe |
| 1981 | Ohio | Kim Seelbrede | Germantown | 20 | **Top 12** |
| 1982 | Arkansas | Terri Utley | Cabot | 20 | **4th Runner-Up** |
| 1983 | California | Julie Hayek | La Cañada | 22 | **1st Runner-Up** |
| 1984 | New Mexico | Mai Shanley | Alamogordo | 21 | **Top 10** |
| 1985 | Texas | Laura Martinez-Herring | El Paso | 21 | **Top 10** |
| 1986 | Texas | Christy Fichtner | Dallas | 23 | **1st Runner-Up** |
| 1987 | Texas | Michelle Royer | Keller | 21 | **2nd Runner-Up** |
| 1988 | Texas | Courtney Gibbs | Fort Worth | 21 | **Top 10** |
| 1989 | Texas | Gretchen Polhemus | Fort Worth | 23 | **2nd Runner-Up** |
| 1990 | Michigan | Carole Gist | Detroit | 20 | **1st Runner-Up** |
| 1991 | Kansas | Kelli McCarty | Liberal | 21 | **Top 6** |
| 1992 | California | Shannon Marketic | Malibu | 21 | **Top 10** |
| 1993 | Michigan | Kenya Moore | Detroit | 22 | **Top 6** |
| 1994 | South Carolina | Lu Parker | Charleston | 25 | **Top 6** |
| **1995** | **Texas** | **Chelsi Smith** | **Deer Park** | **21** | **Miss Universe 1995** |
| **1995** | New York | Shanna Moakler | New York | 20 | 1st Runner-Up at Miss USA; Assumed title when Chelsi Smith won Miss Universe |
| 1996 | Louisiana | Ali Landry | Breaux Bridge | 22 | **Top 6** |
| **1997** | **Hawaii** | **Brook Lee** | **Pearl City** | **26** | **Miss Universe 1997** |
| **1997** | Idaho | Brandi Sherwood | Idaho Falls | 26 | 1st Runner-Up at Miss USA; Assumed title when Brook Lee won Miss Universe |
| 1998 | Massachusetts | Shawnae Jebbia | Boston | 26 | **Top 5** |
| 1999 | New York | Kimberly Pressler | Franklinville | 21 | Unplaced |
| 2000 | Tennessee | Lynnette Cole | Columbia | 21 | **Top 5** |
| 2001 | Texas | Kandace Krueger | Austin | 24 | **2nd Runner-Up** |
| 2002 | District of Columbia | Shauntay Hinton | Washington, D.C. | 23 | Unplaced |
| 2003 | Massachusetts | Susie Castillo | Lawrence | 23 | **Top 15** |
| 2004 | Missouri | Shandi Finnessey | Florissant | 25 | **1st Runner-Up** |
| 2005 | North Carolina | Chelsea Cooley | Charlotte | 21 | **Top 10** |
| 2006 | Kentucky | Tara Conner | Russell Springs | 20 | **4th Runner-Up** |
| 2007 | Tennessee | Rachel Smith | Clarksville | 21 | **4th Runner-Up** |
| 2008 | Texas | Crystle Stewart | Missouri City | 26 | **Top 10** |
| 2009 | North Carolina | Kristen Dalton | Wilmington | 22 | **Top 10** |
| 2010 | Michigan | Rima Fakih | Dearborn | 24 | Unplaced |
| 2011 | California | Alyssa Campanella | Los Angeles | 21 | **Top 16** |
| **2012** | **Rhode Island** | **Olivia Culpo** | **Cranston** | **20** | **Miss Universe 2012** |
| **2012** | Maryland | Nana Meriwether | Potomac | 27 | 1st Runner-Up at Miss USA; Assumed title when Olivia Culpo won Miss Universe |
| 2013 | Connecticut | Erin Brady | East Hampton | 25 | **Top 10** |
| 2014 | Nevada | Nia Sanchez | Las Vegas | 24 | **1st Runner-Up** |
| 2015 | Oklahoma | Olivia Jordan | Tulsa | 26 | **2nd Runner-Up** |
| 2016 | District of Columbia | Deshauna Barber | Washington, D.C. | 26 | **Top 9** |
| 2017 | District of Columbia | Kára McCullough | Washington, D.C. | 25 | **Top 10** |
| 2018 | Nebraska | Sarah Rose Summers | Omaha | 23 | **Top 20** |
| 2019 | North Carolina | Cheslie Kryst | Charlotte | 28 | **Top 10** |
| 2020 | Mississippi | Asya Branch | Booneville | 22 | **Top 21** |
| 2021 | Kentucky | Elle Smith | Louisville | 23 | **Top 10** |
| **2022** | **Texas** | **R'Bonney Gabriel** | **Houston** | **28** | **Miss Universe 2022** |
| **2022** | North Carolina | Morgan Romano | Concord | 24 | 1st Runner-Up at Miss USA; Assumed title when R'Bonney Gabriel won Miss Universe |
| 2023 | Utah | Noelia Voigt (Resigned) | Park City | 23 | **Top 20** |
| 2023 | Hawaii | Savannah Gankiewicz (Assumed) | Kihei | 27 | 1st Runner-Up at Miss USA; Assumed title when Noelia Voigt resigned |
| 2024 | Michigan | Alma Cooper | Okemos | 22 | Unplaced |
| 2025 | Nebraska | Audrey Eckert | Lincoln | 23 | **Top 30** |
| 2026 | Virginia | Justus Kelley | Arlington | 31 | TBA |

=== Gallery ===
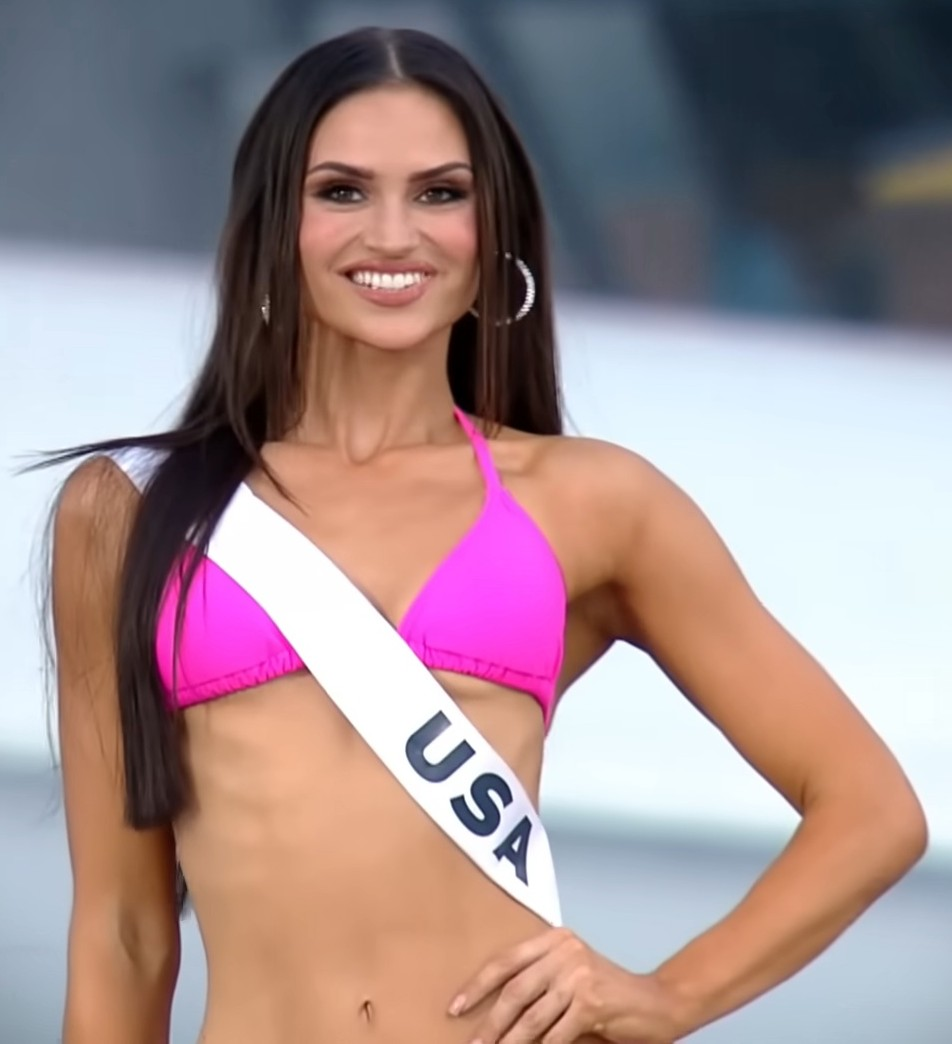
**Miss USA 2025**
Audrey Eckert, Nebraska

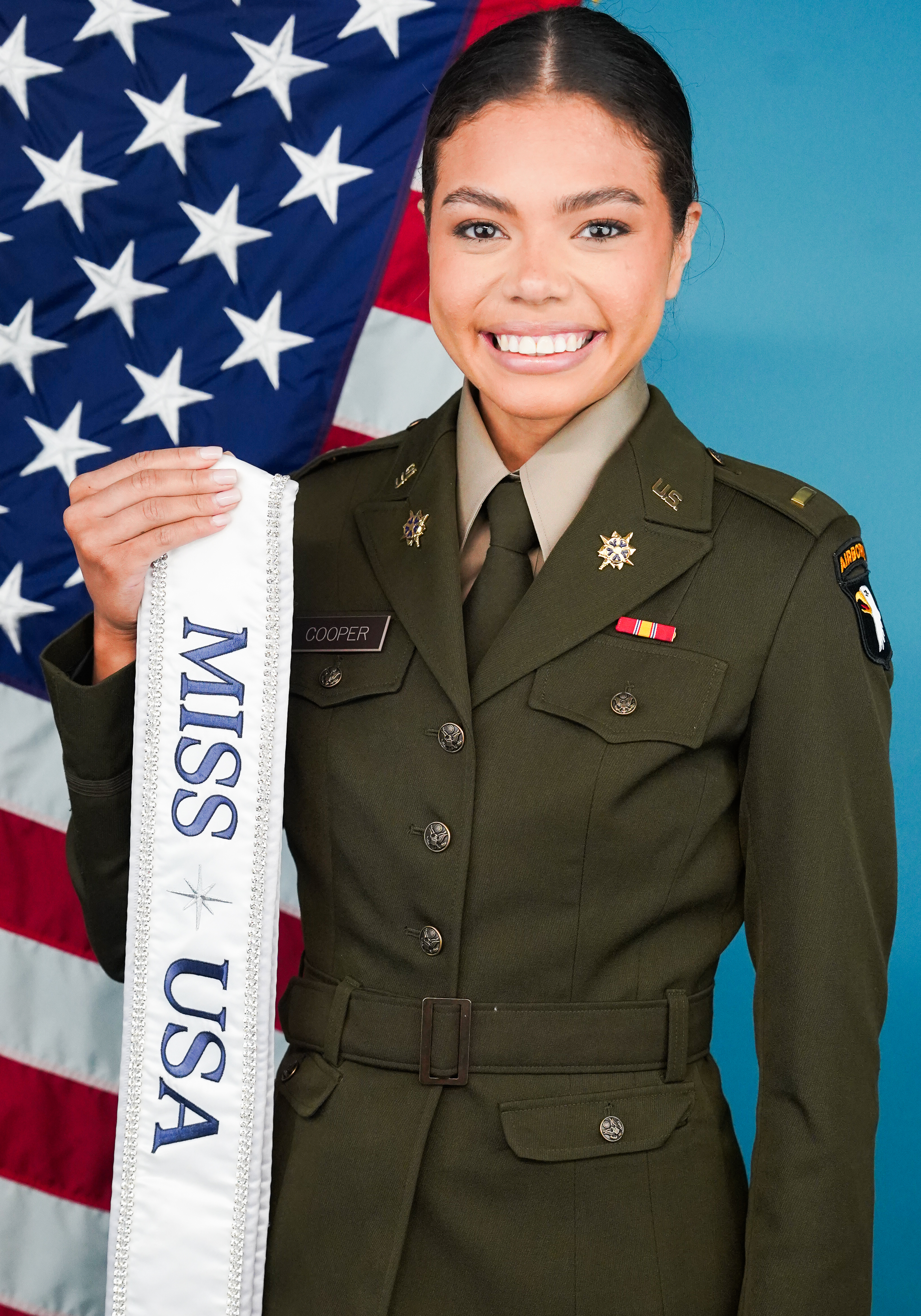
**Miss USA 2024**
Alma Cooper, Michigan

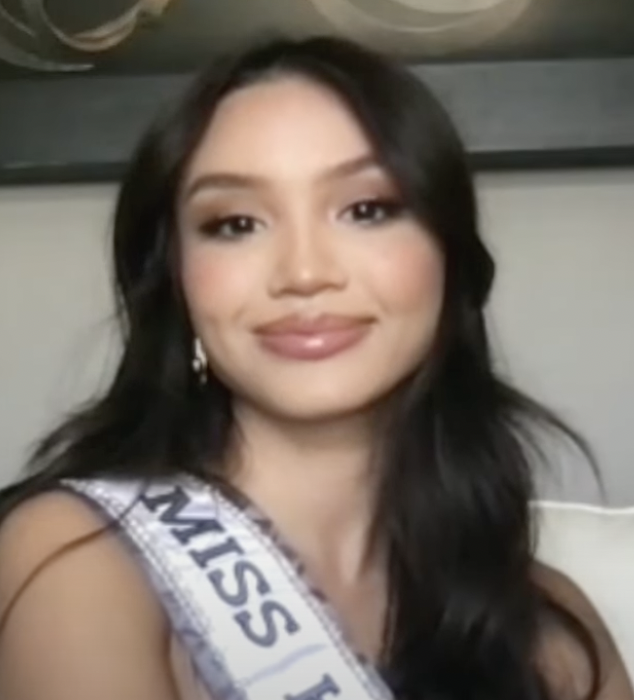
**Miss USA 2023**
Savannah Gankiewicz, Hawaii
(Became Miss USA after the resignation of Noelia Voigt)

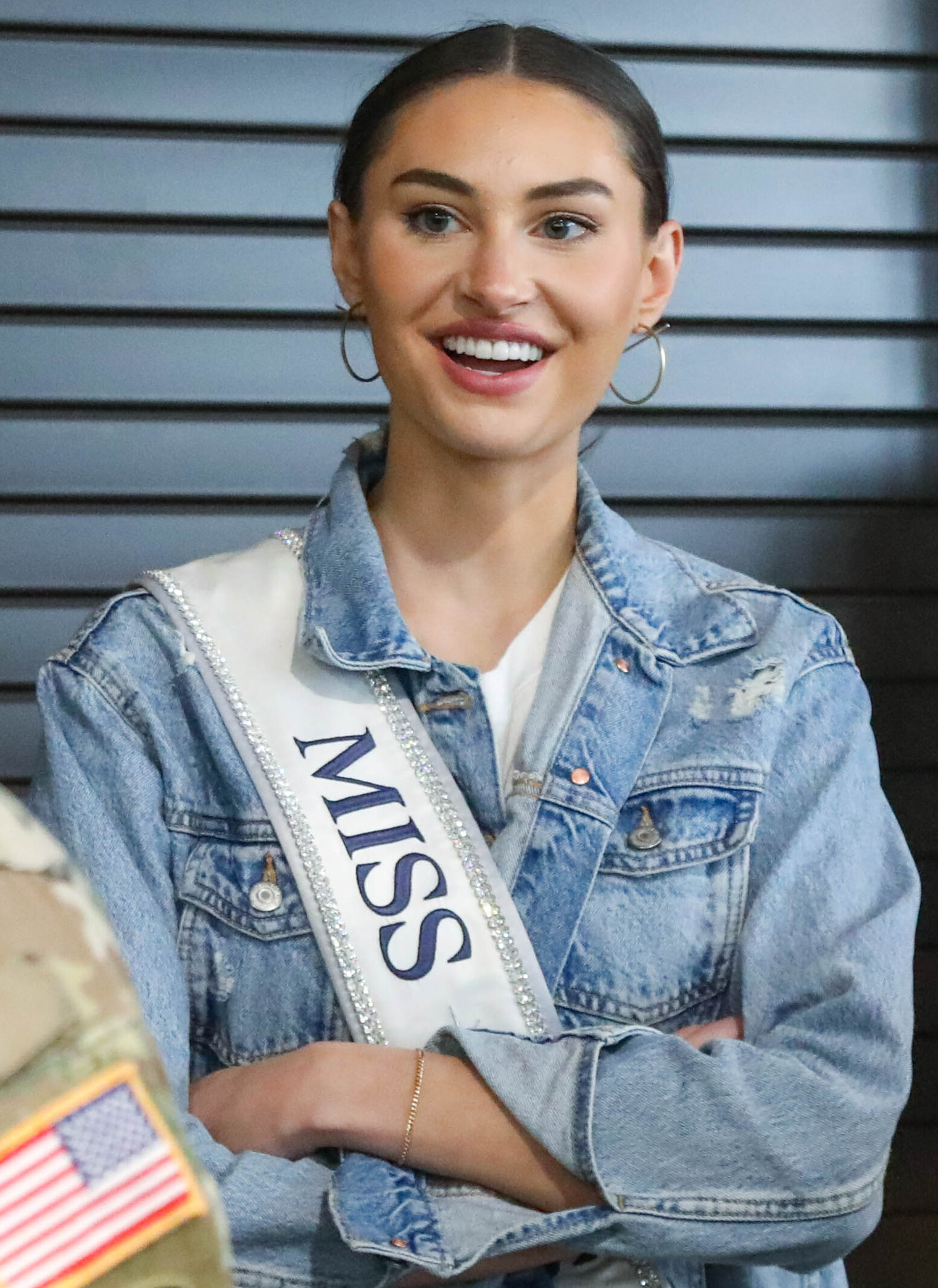
**Miss USA 2022**
Morgan Romano, North Carolina
(Became Miss USA after R'Bonney Gabriel became Miss Universe 2022)

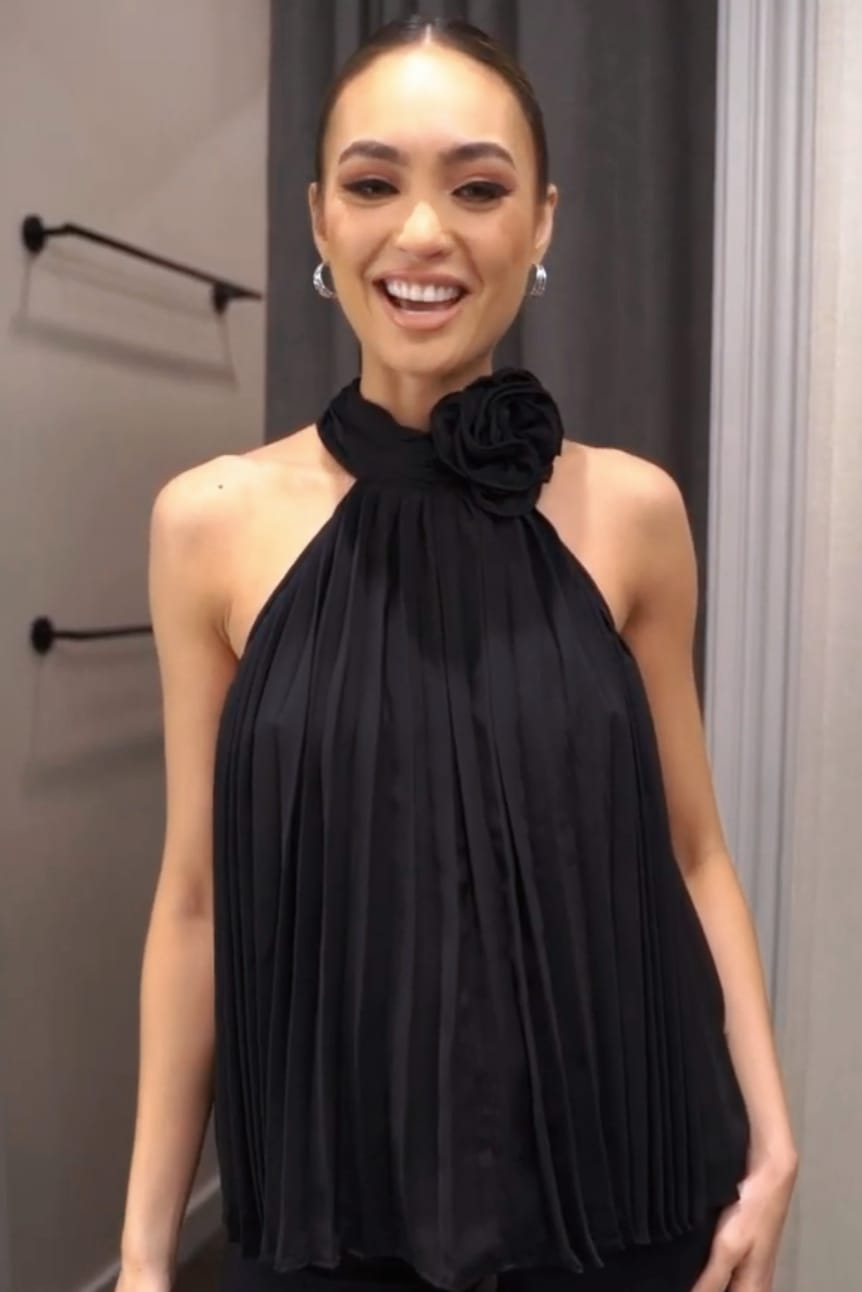
**Miss Universe 2022**
R'Bonney Gabriel, Texas

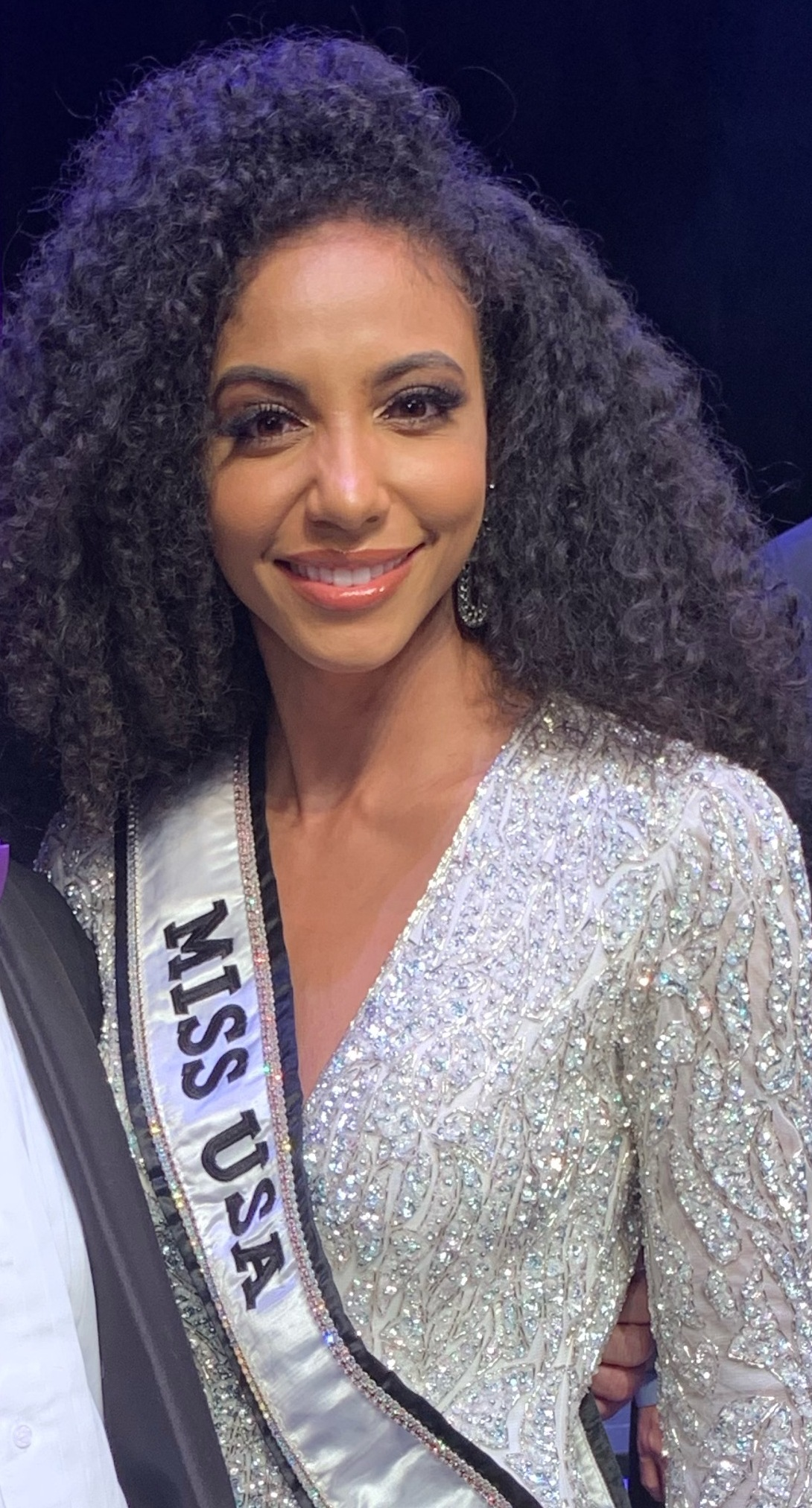
**Miss USA 2019**
Cheslie Kryst, North Carolina

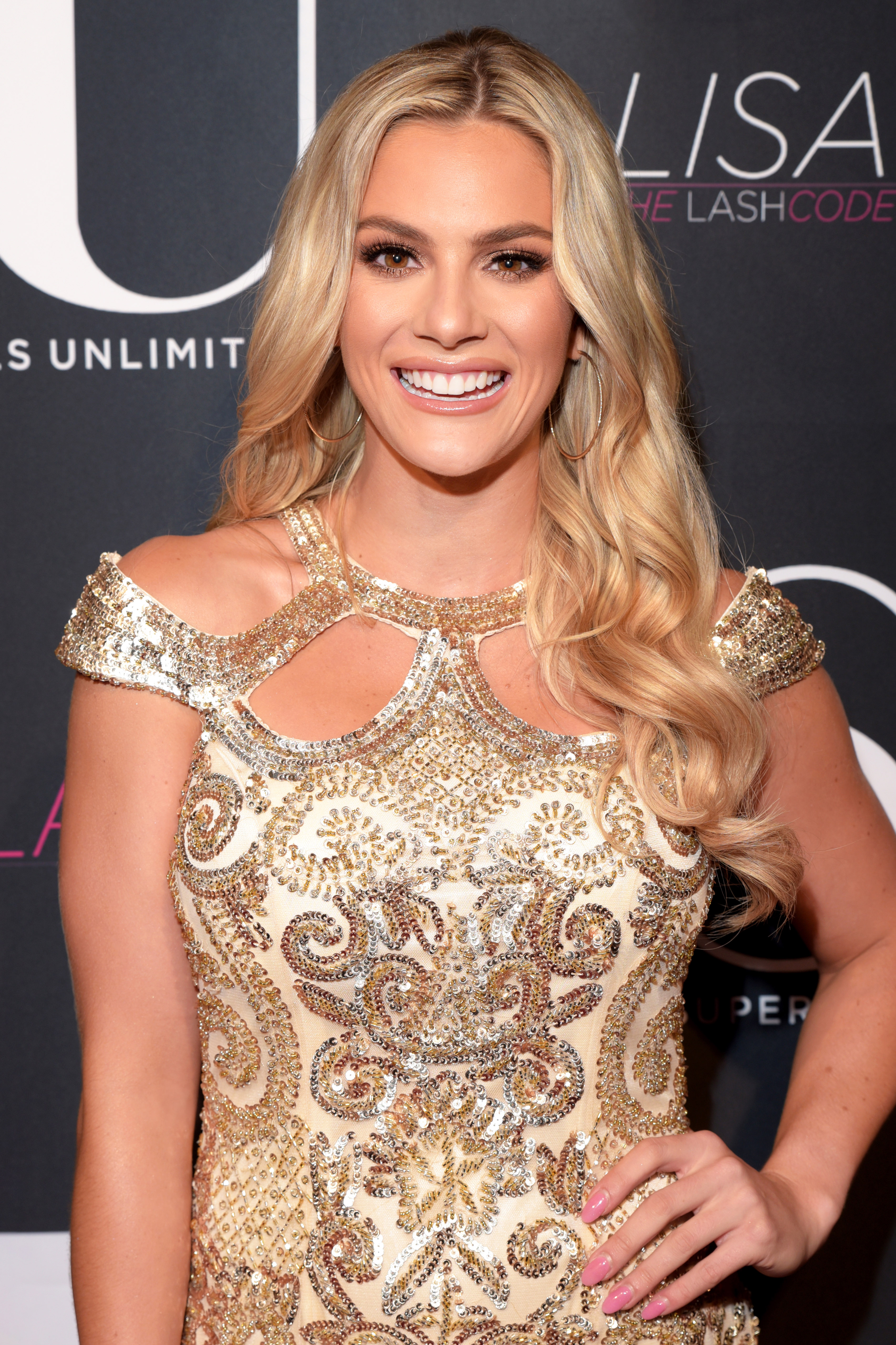
**Miss USA 2018**
Sarah Rose Summers, Nebraska

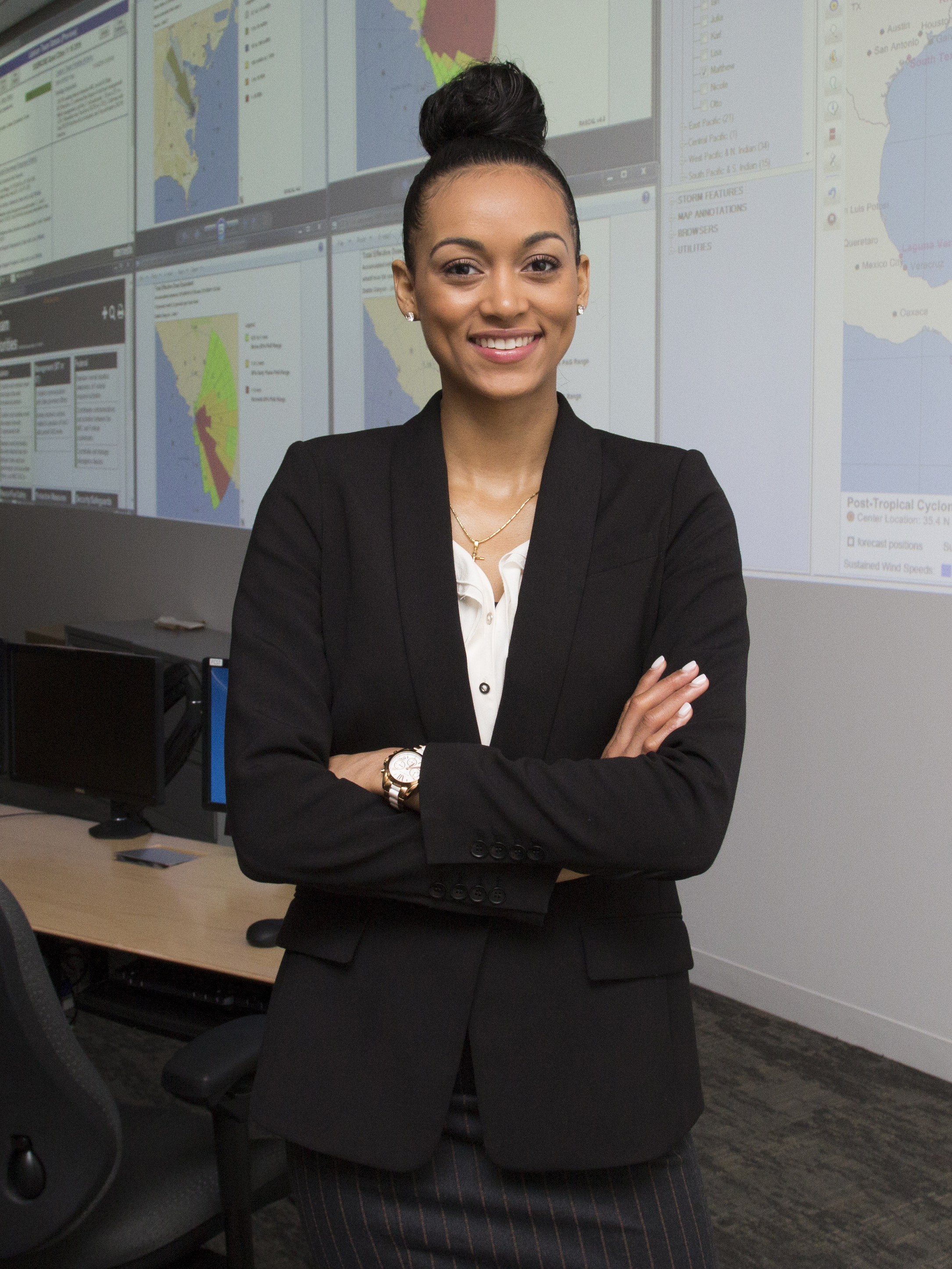
**Miss USA 2017**
Kára McCullough, District of Columbia

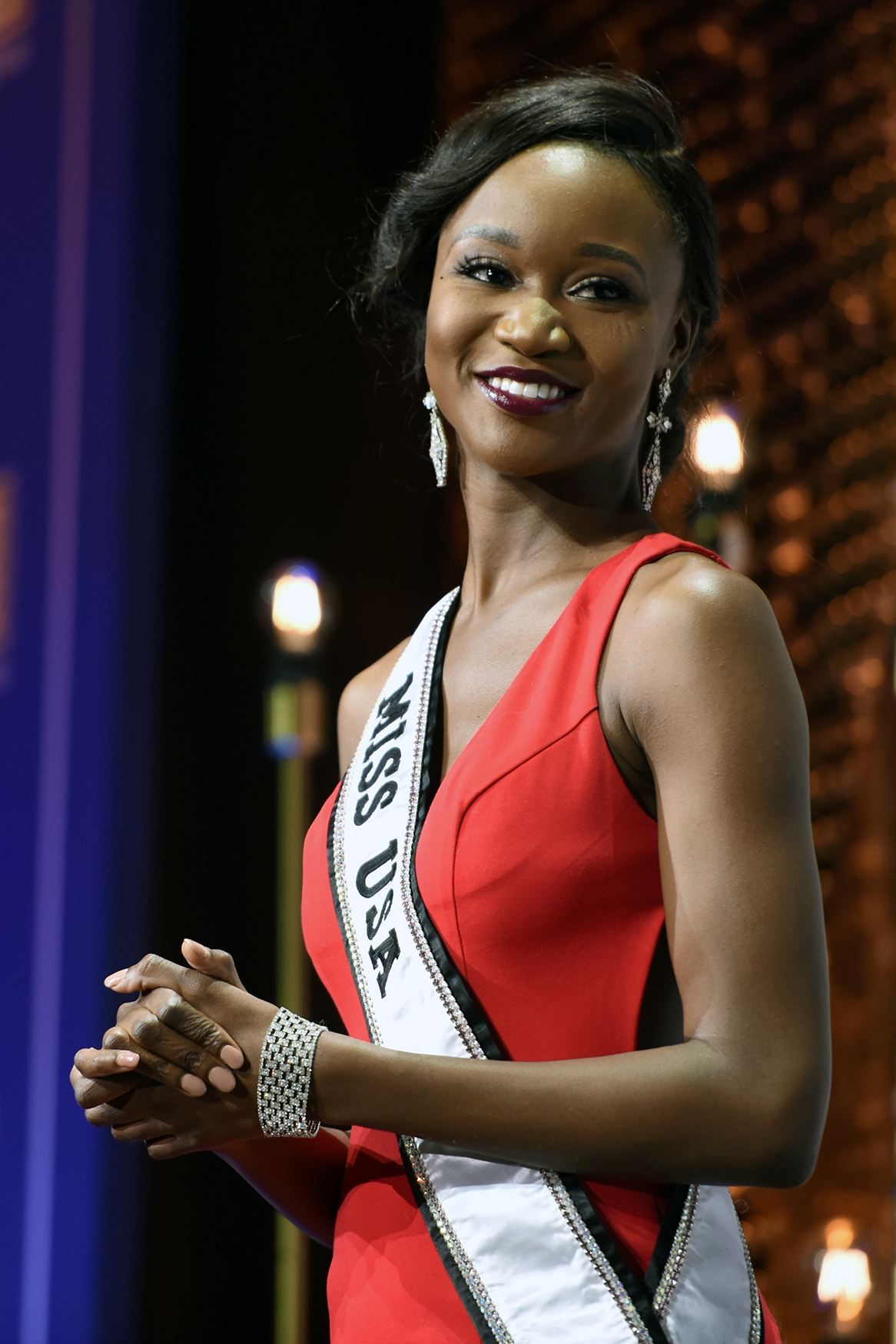
**Miss USA 2016**
Deshauna Barber, District of Columbia

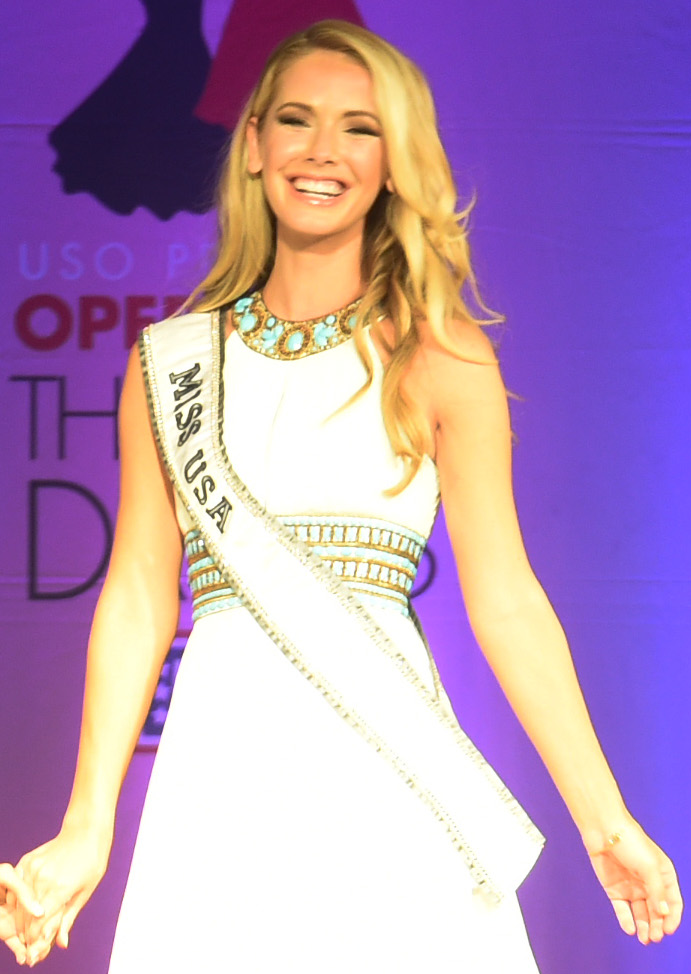
**Miss USA 2015**
Olivia Jordan, Oklahoma

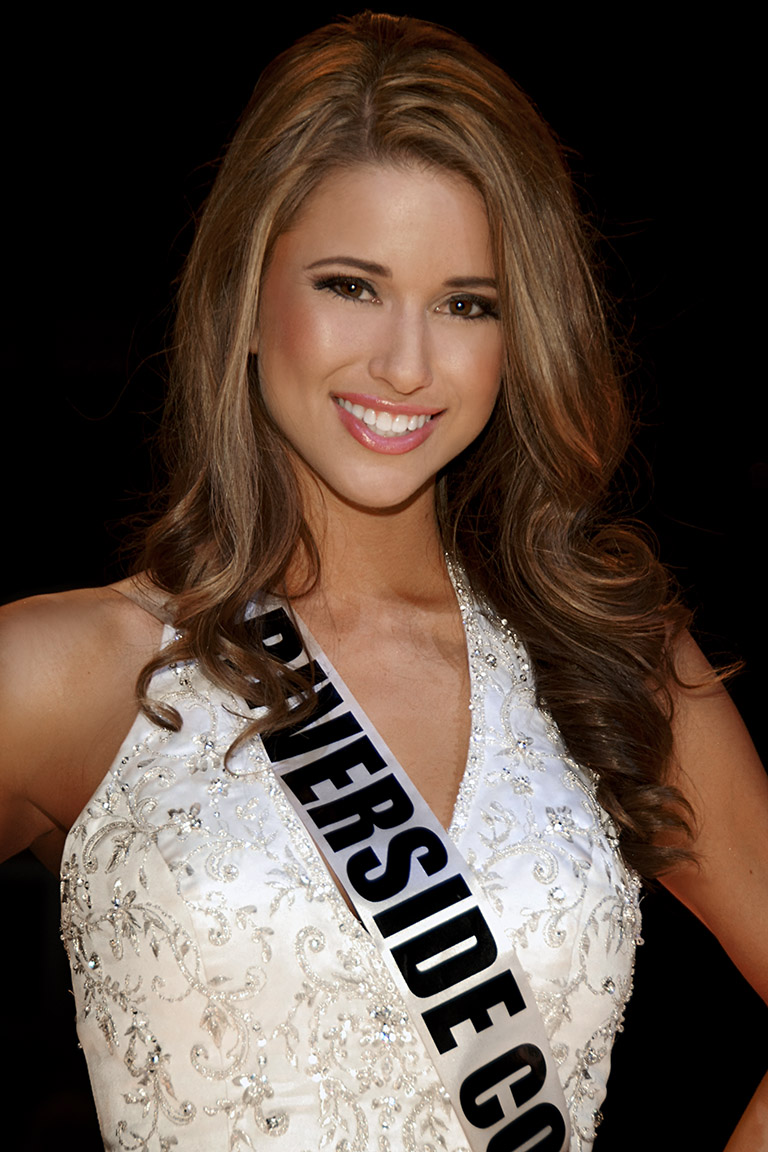
**Miss USA 2014**
Nia Sanchez, Nevada

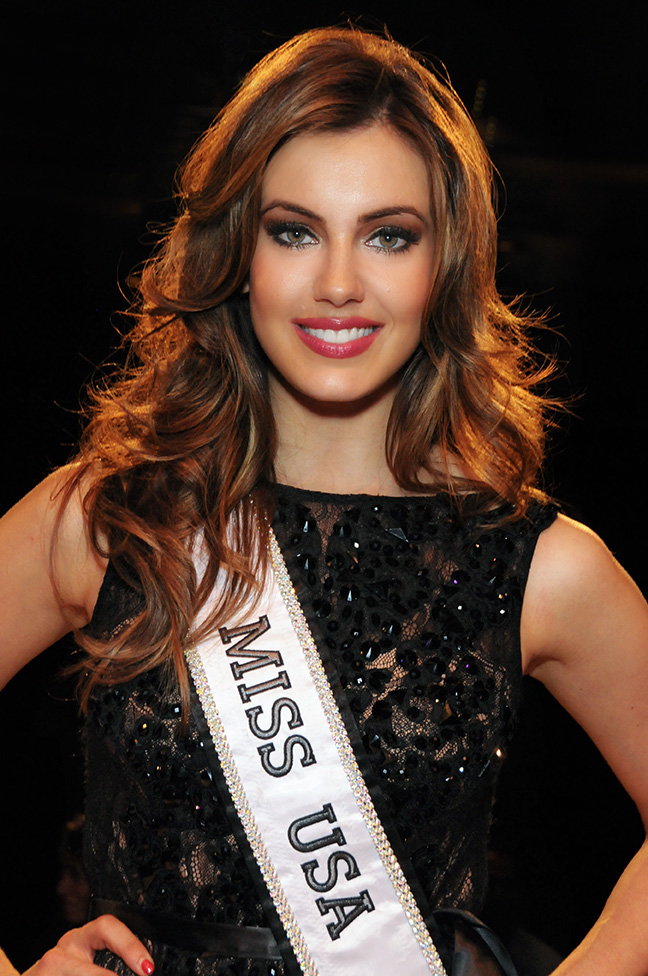
**Miss USA 2013**
Erin Brady, Connecticut

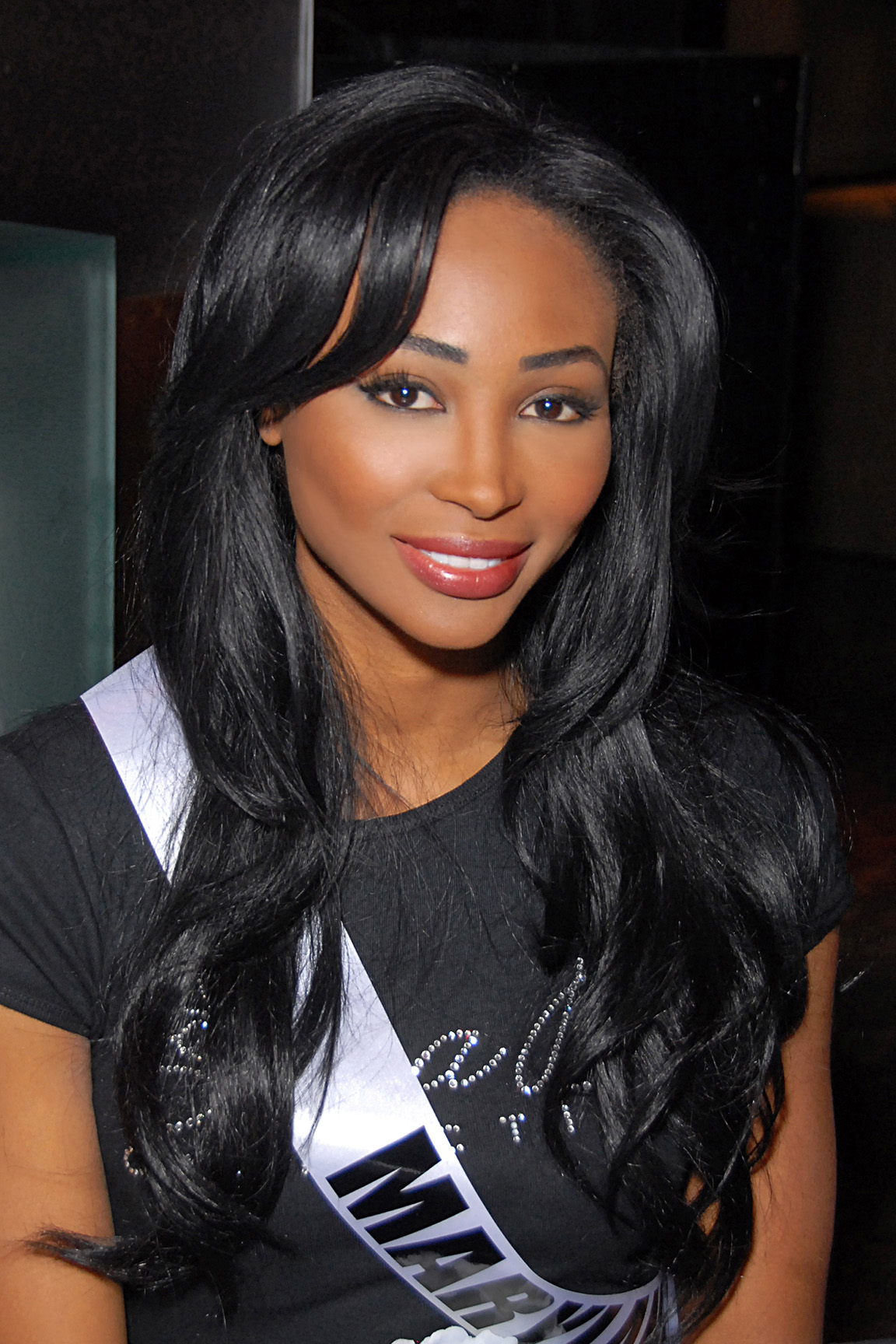
**Miss USA 2012**
Nana Meriwether, Maryland
(Became Miss USA after Olivia Culpo became Miss Universe 2012)

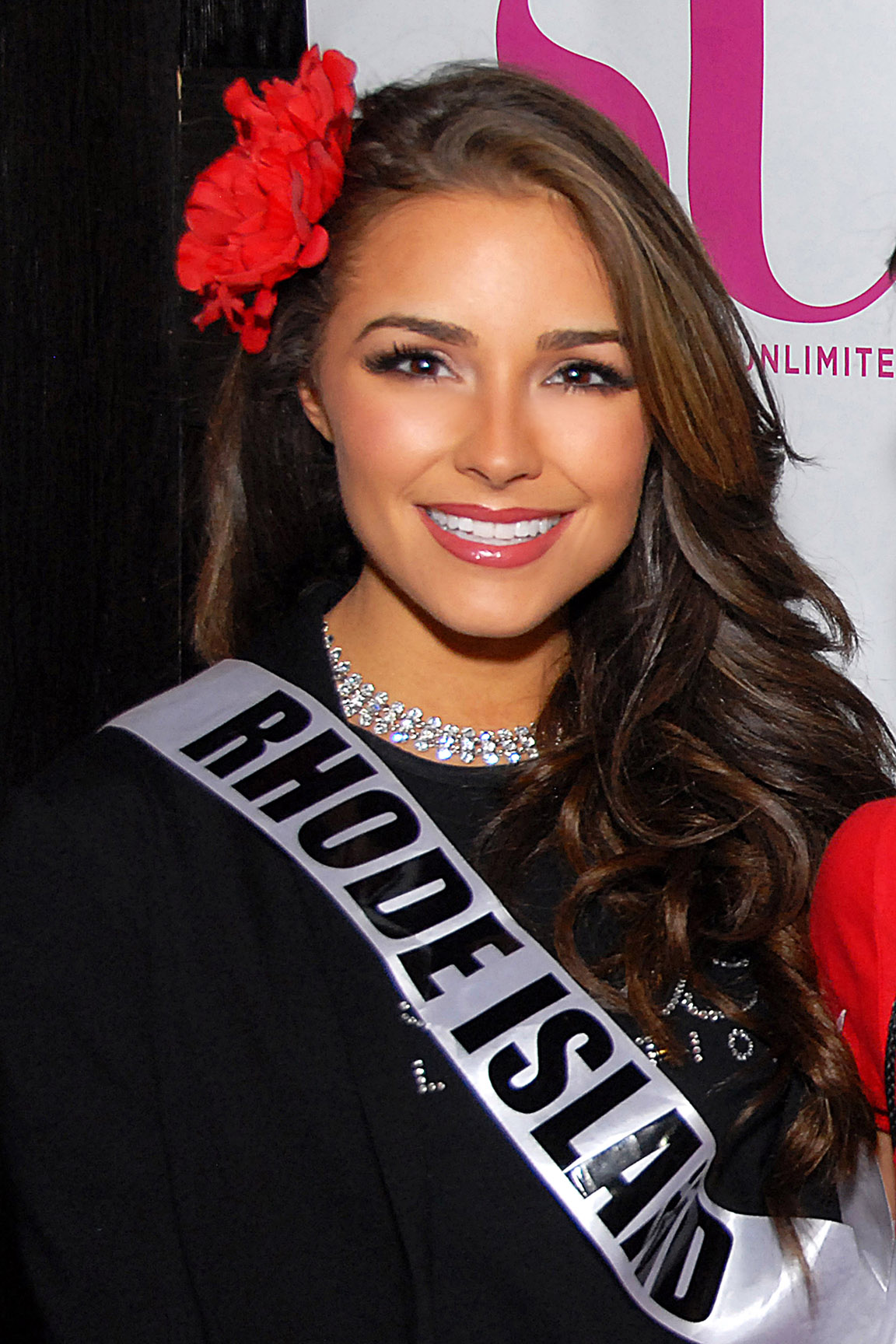
**Miss Universe 2012**
Olivia Culpo, Rhode Island.

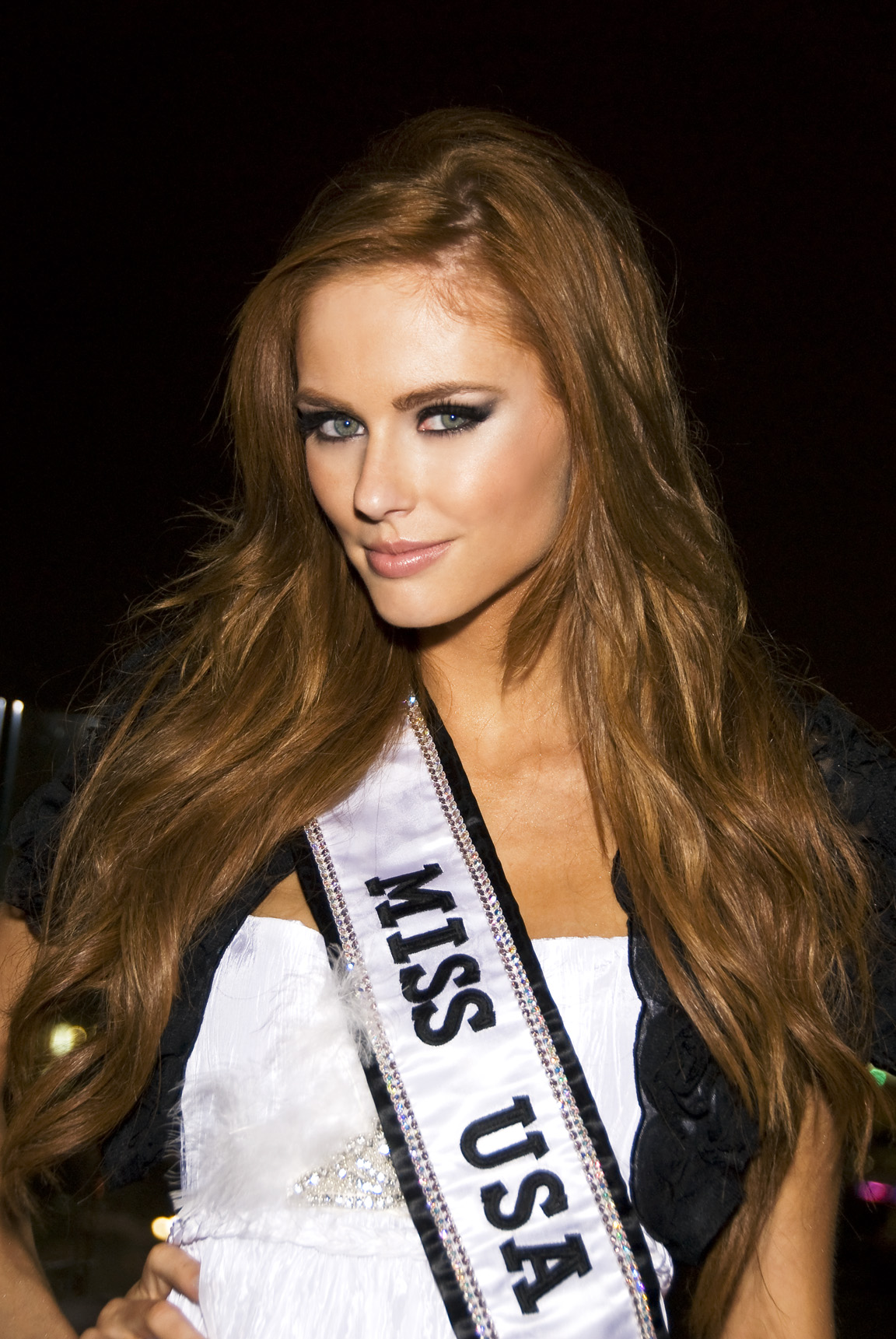
**Miss USA 2011**
Alyssa Campanella, California

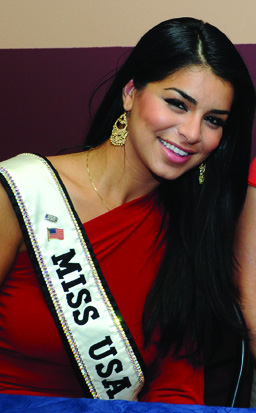
**Miss USA 2010**
Rima Fakih, Michigan

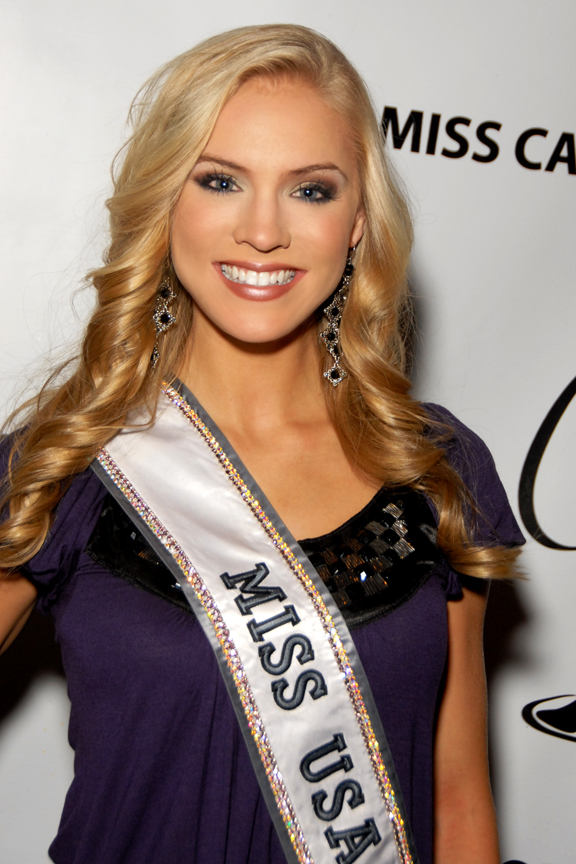
**Miss USA 2009**
Kristen Dalton, North Carolina

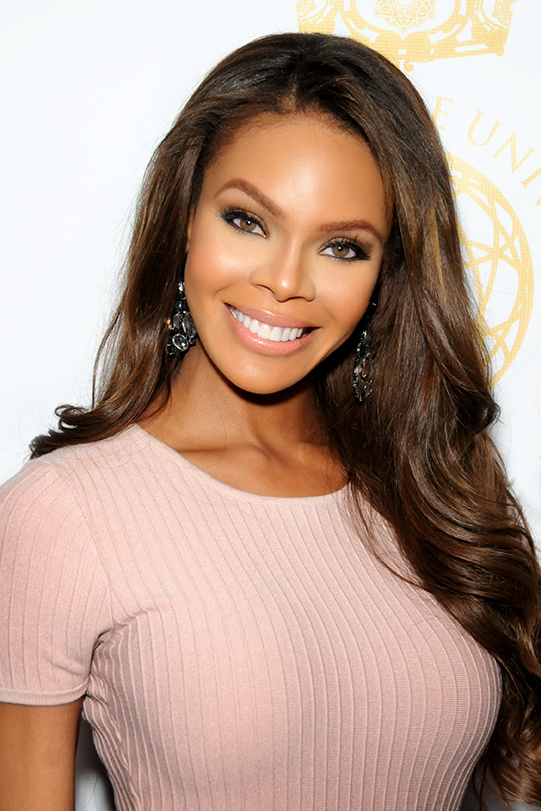
**Miss USA 2008**
Crystle Stewart, Texas

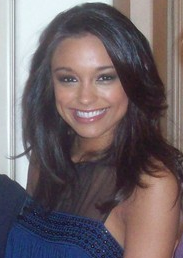
**Miss USA 2007**
Rachel Smith, Tennessee

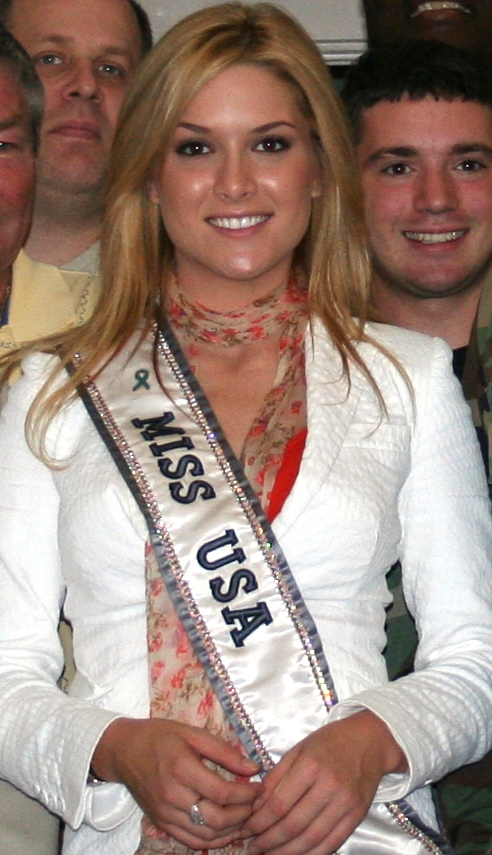
**Miss USA 2006**
Tara Conner, Kentucky

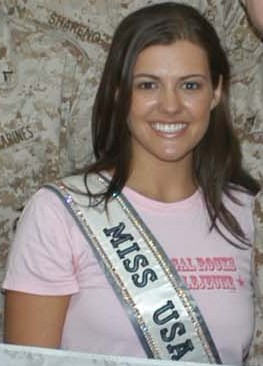
**Miss USA 2005**
Chelsea Cooley, North Carolina

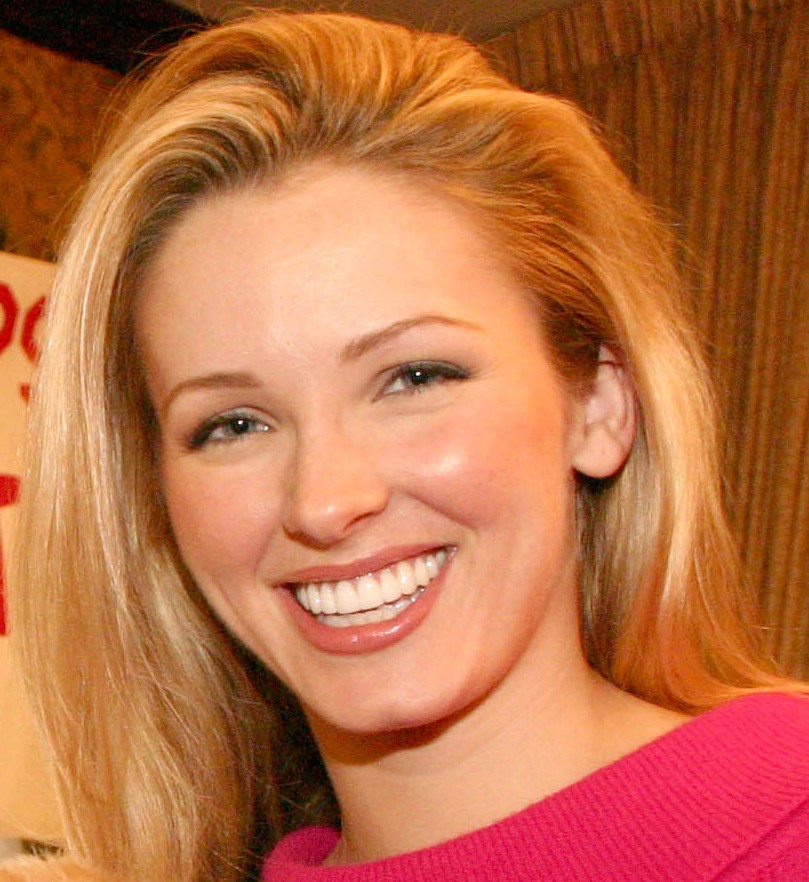
**Miss USA 2004**
Shandi Finnessey, Missouri

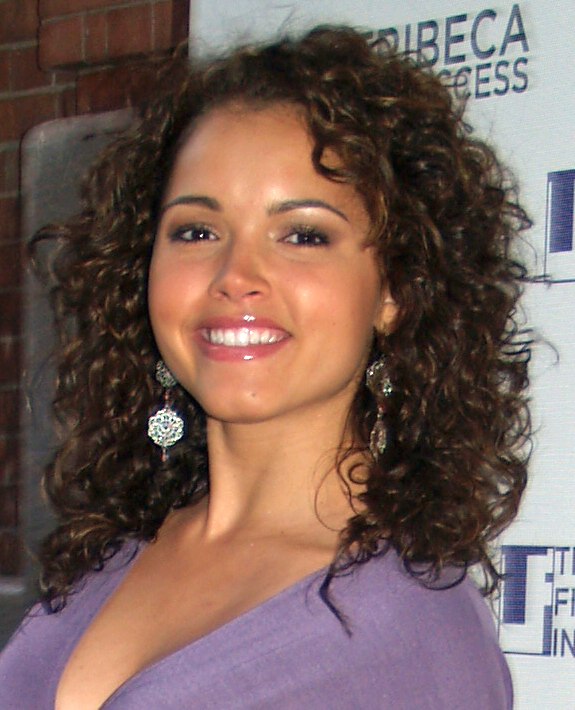
**Miss USA 2003**
Susie Castillo, Massachusetts

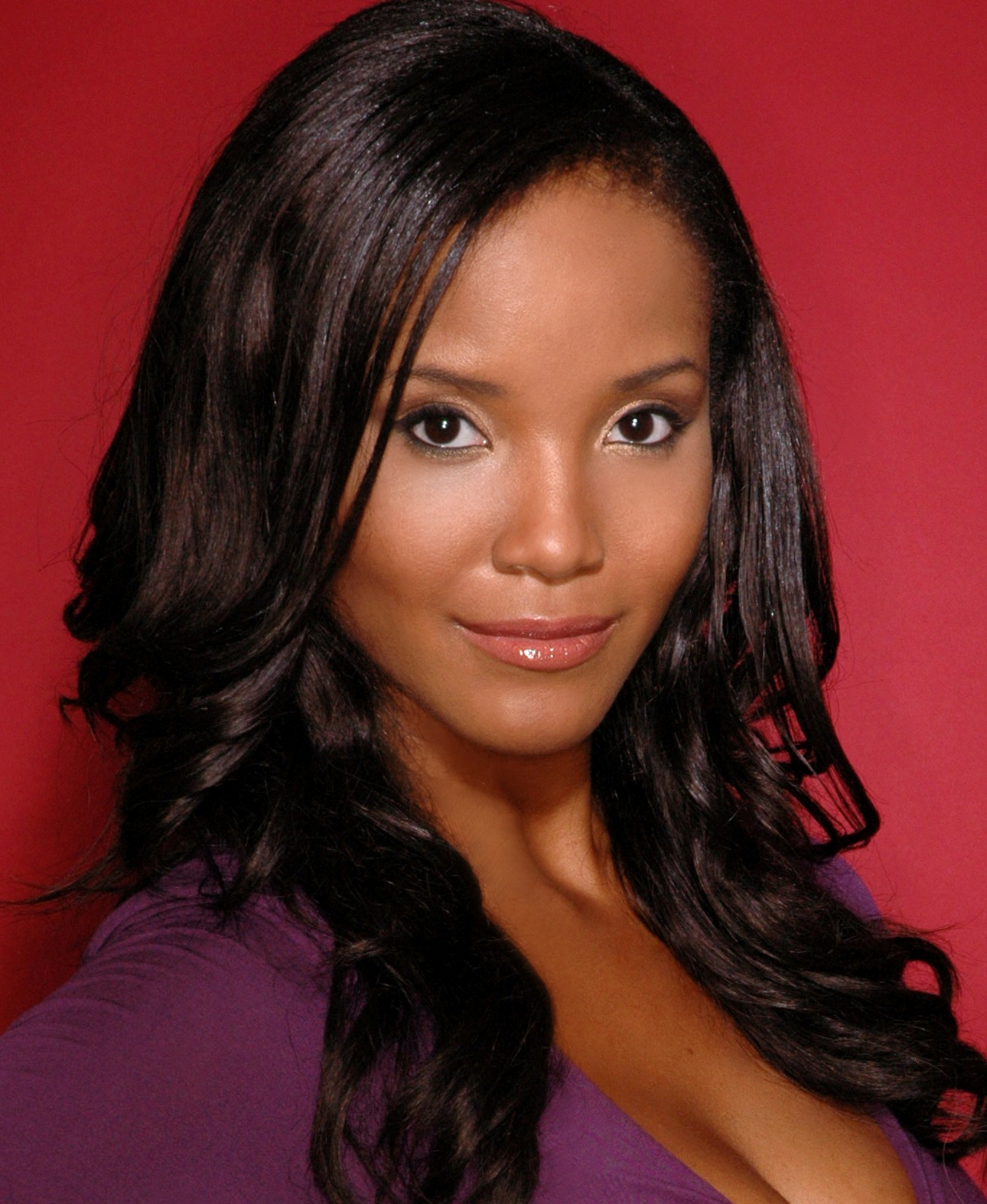
**Miss USA 2002**
Shauntay Hinton, District of Columbia

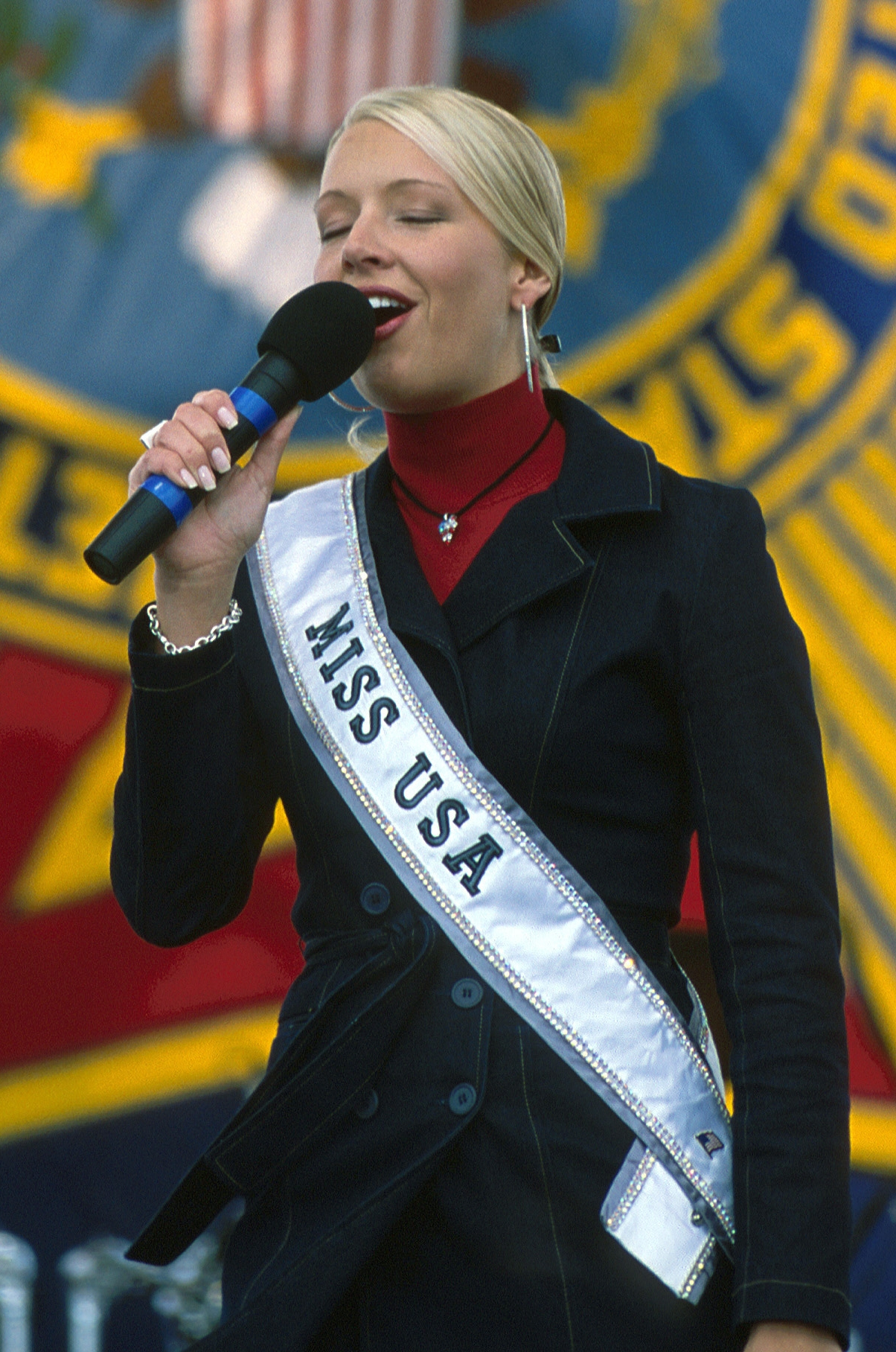
**Miss USA 2001**
Kandace Krueger, Texas

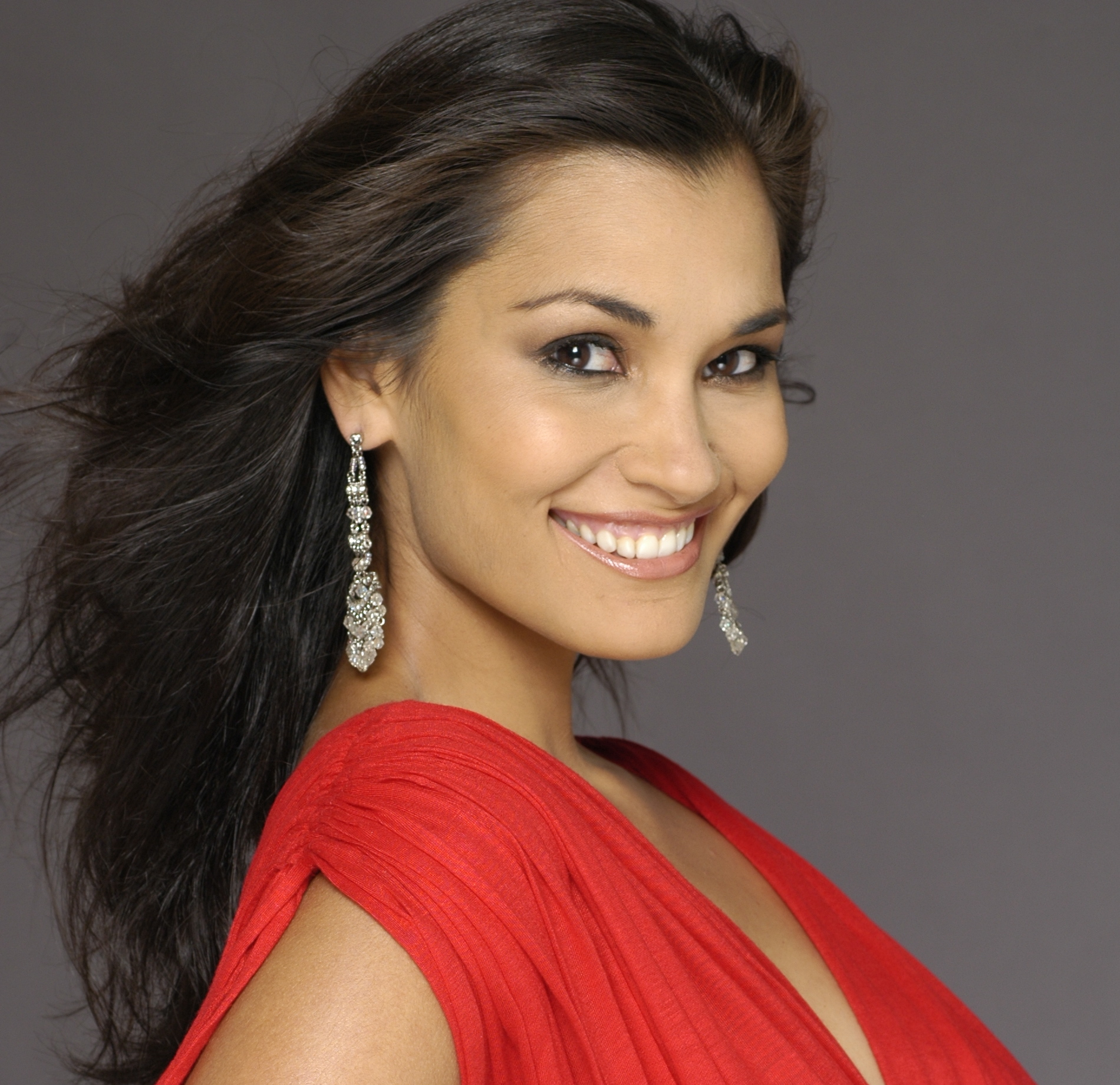
**Miss Universe 1997**
Brook Lee, Hawaii

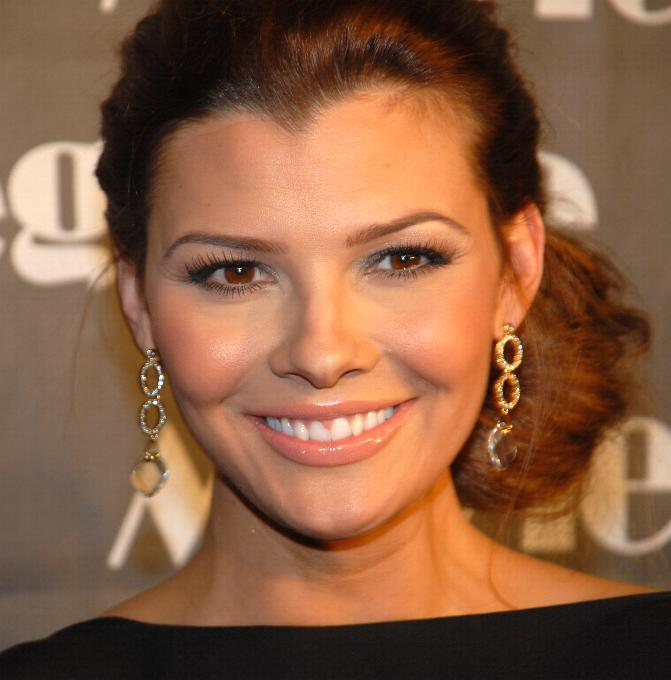
**Miss USA 1996**
Ali Landry, Louisiana

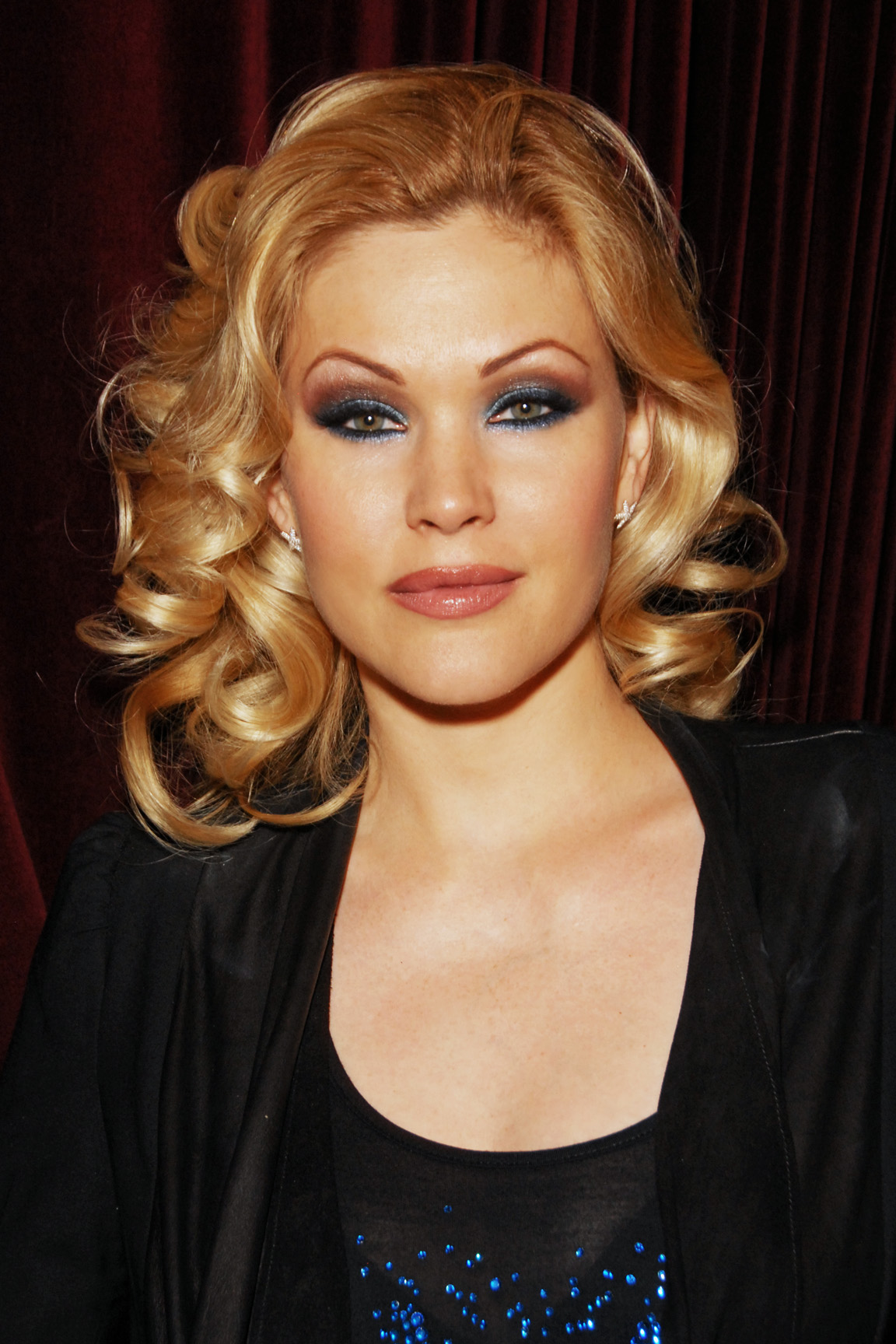
**Miss USA 1995**
Shanna Moakler, New York
(Became Miss USA after Chelsi Smith became Miss Universe 1995)

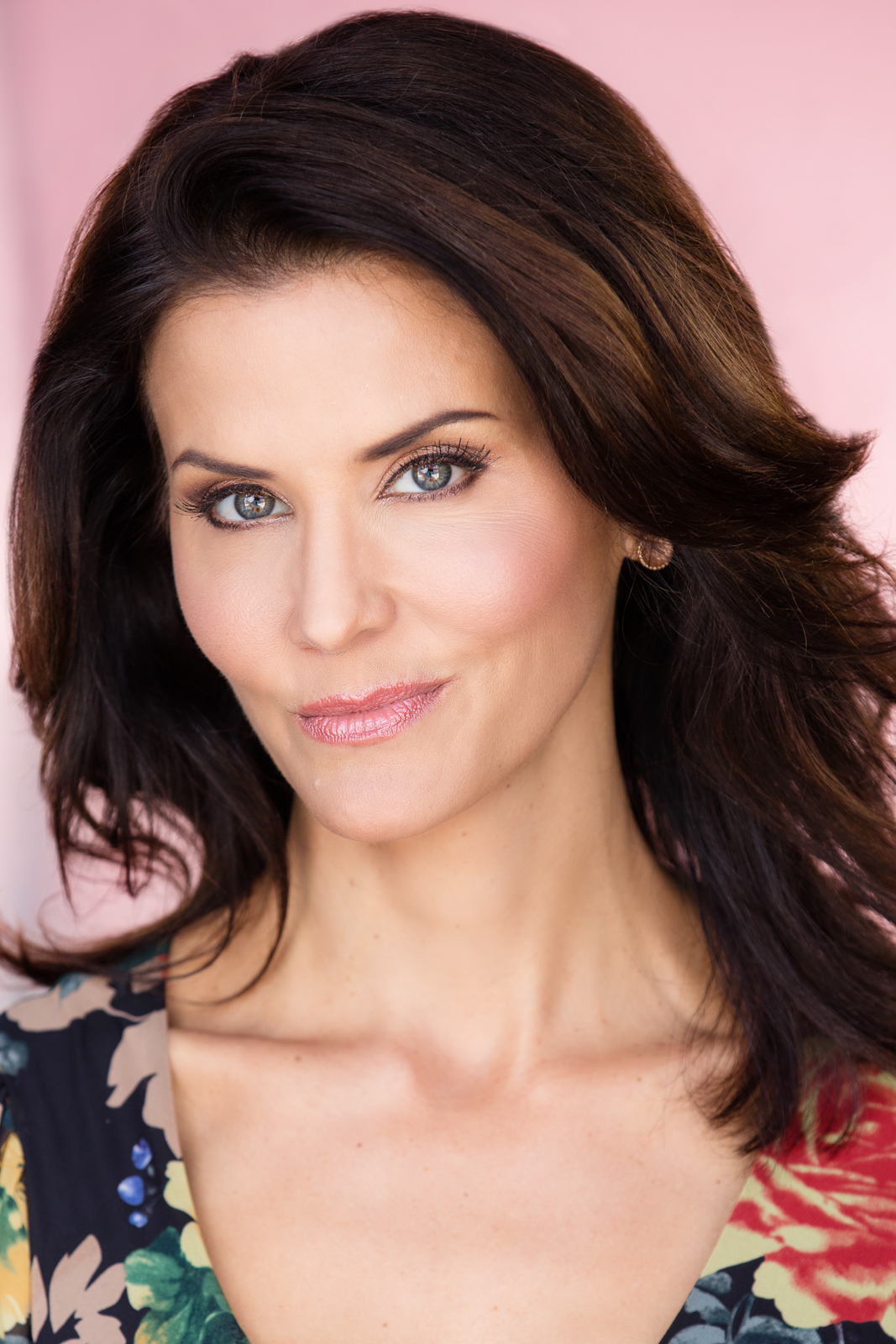
**Miss USA 1994**
Lu Parker, South Carolina

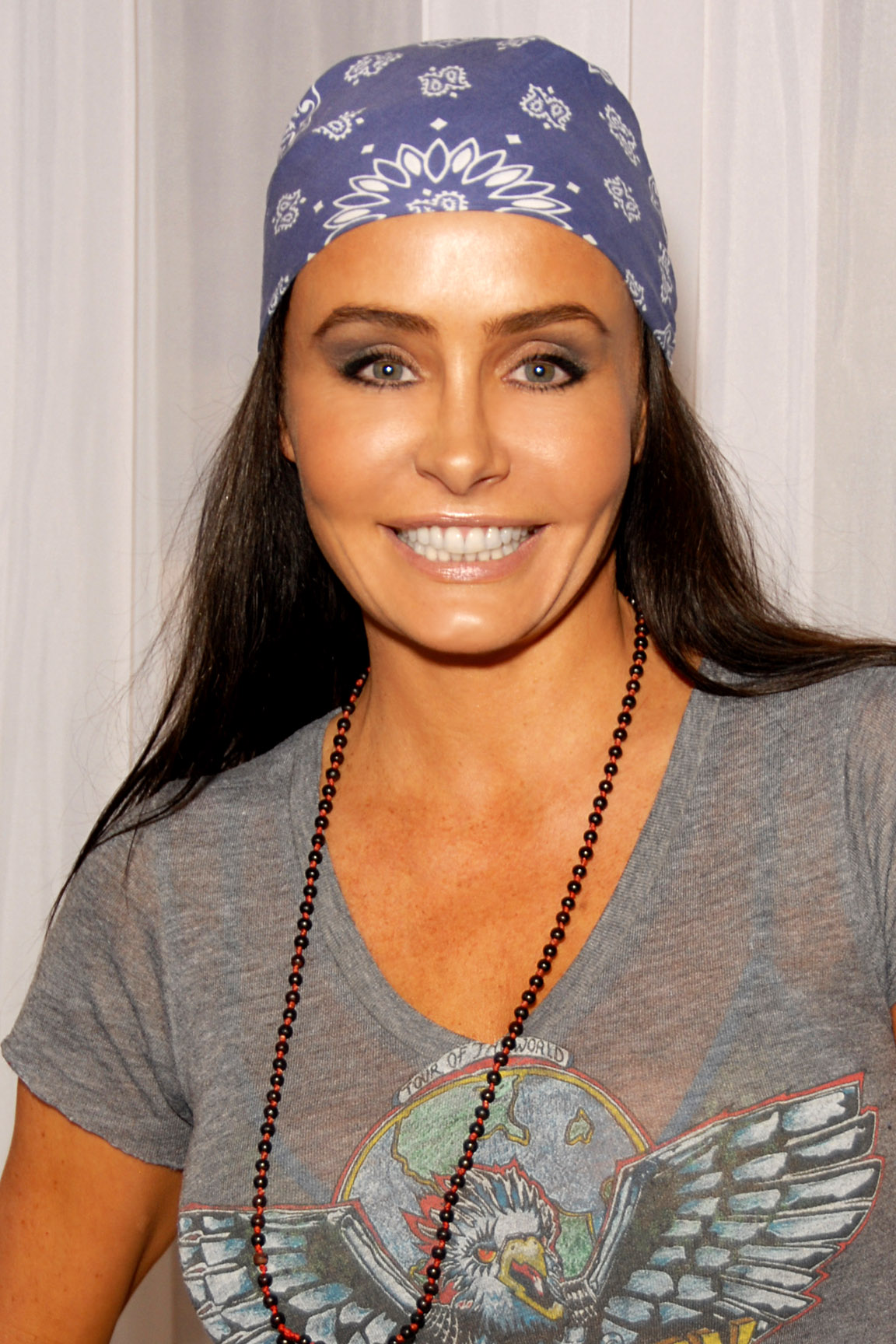
**Miss USA 1991**
Kelli McCarty, Kansas

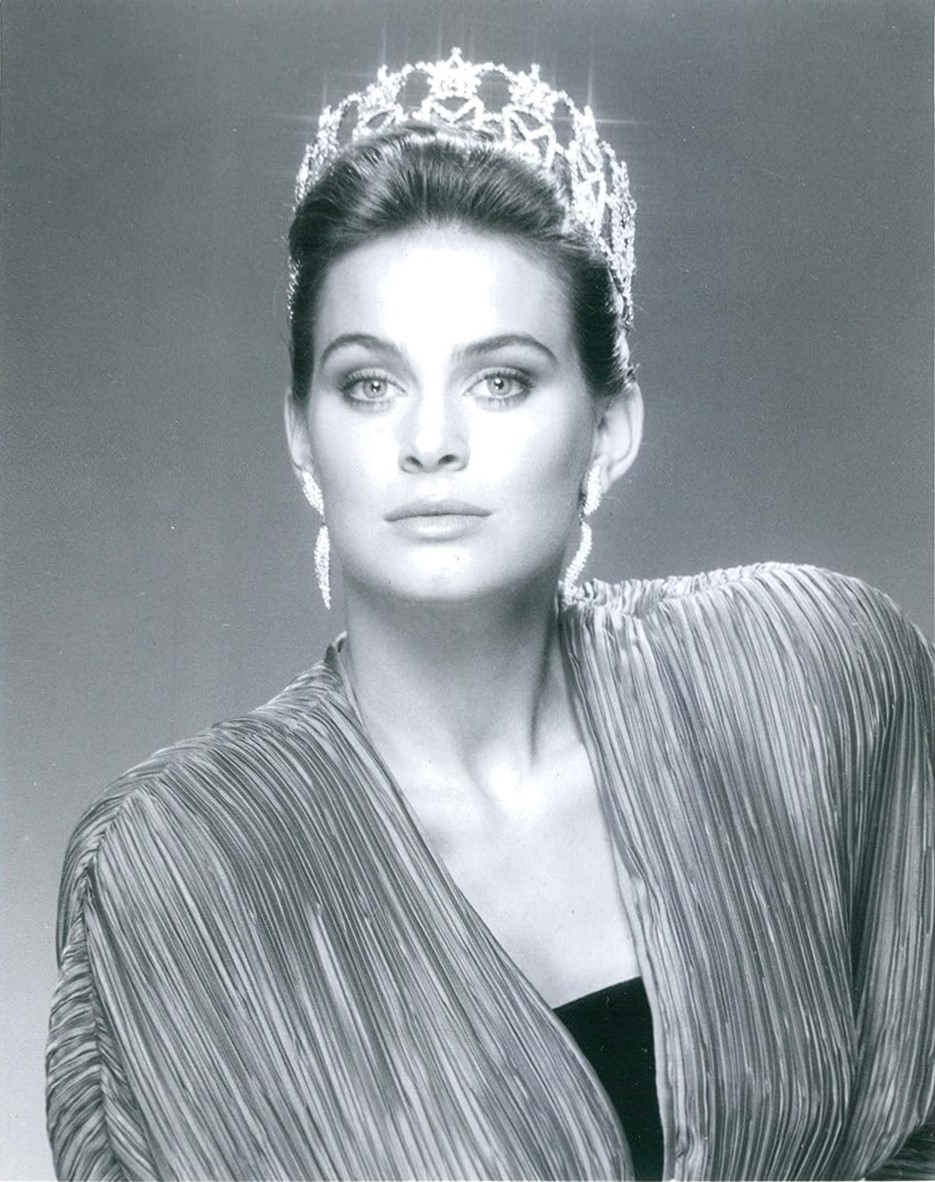
**Miss USA 1988**
Courtney Gibbs, Texas

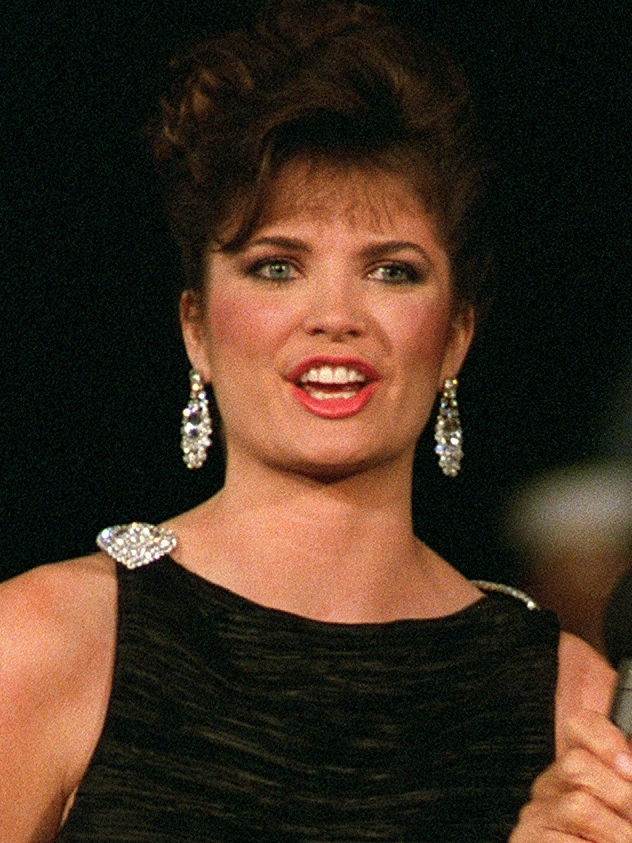
**Miss USA 1987**
Michelle Royer, Texas

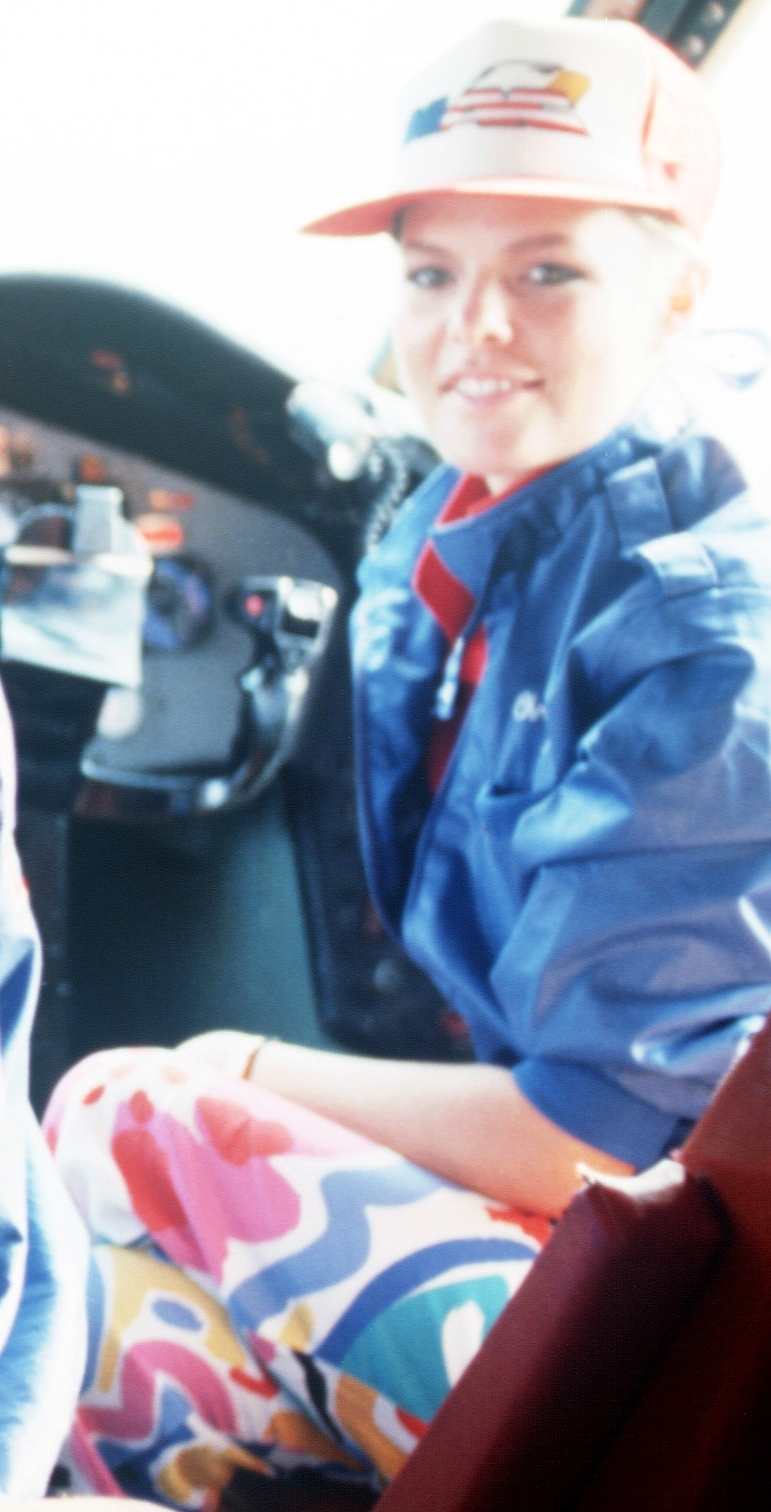
**Miss USA 1986**
Christy Fichtner, Texas

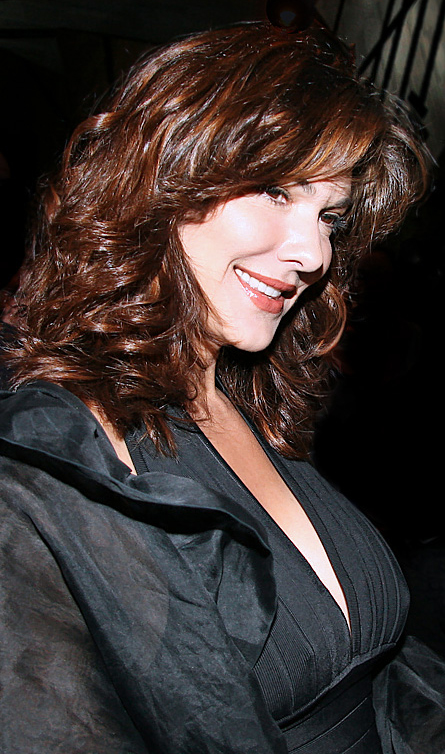
**Miss USA 1985**
Laura Harring, Texas

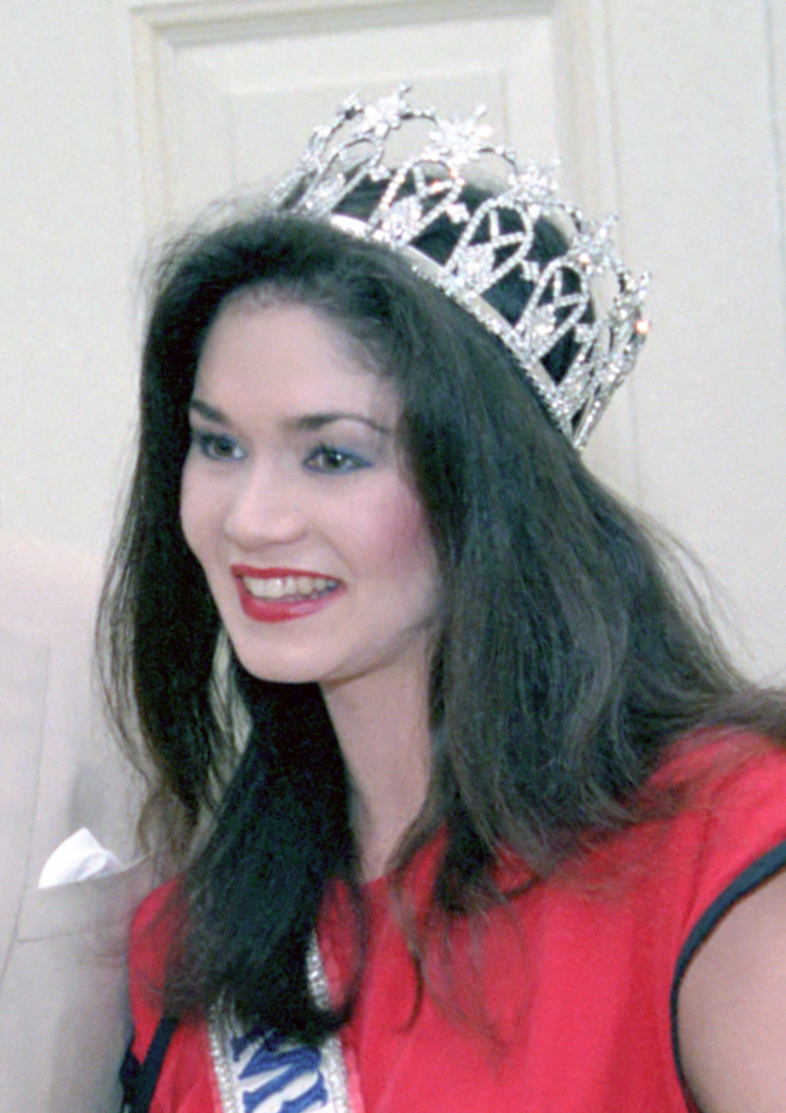
**Miss USA 1984**
Mai Shanley, Miss New Mexico

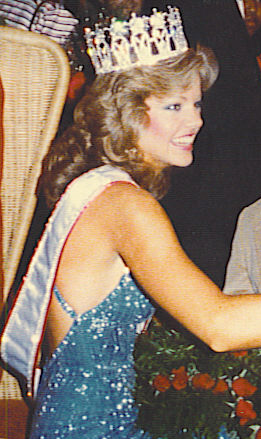
**Miss USA 1983**
Julie Hayek, California

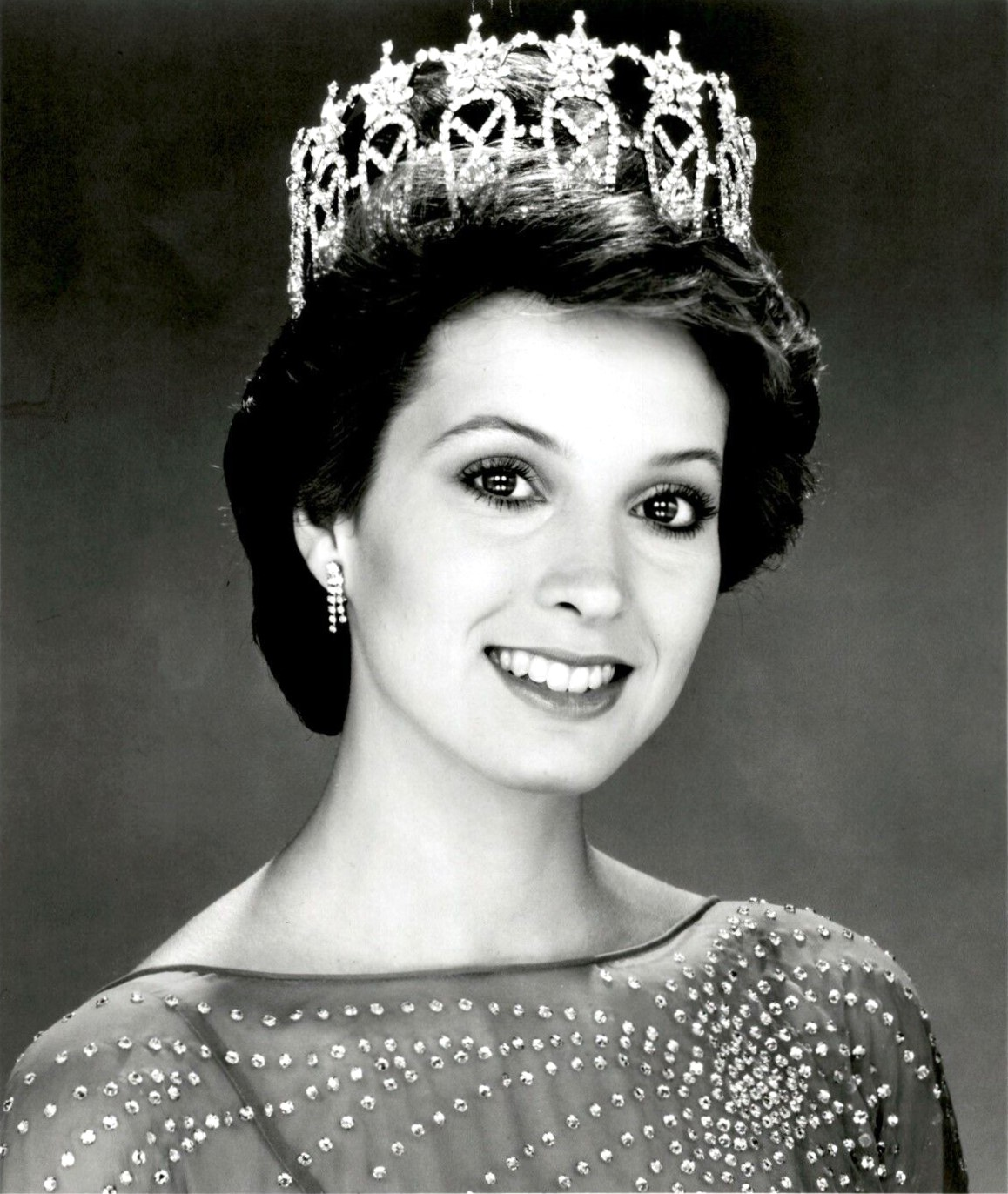
**Miss USA 1982**
Terri Utley, Arkansas

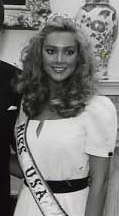
**Miss USA 1981**
Kim Seelbrede, Ohio

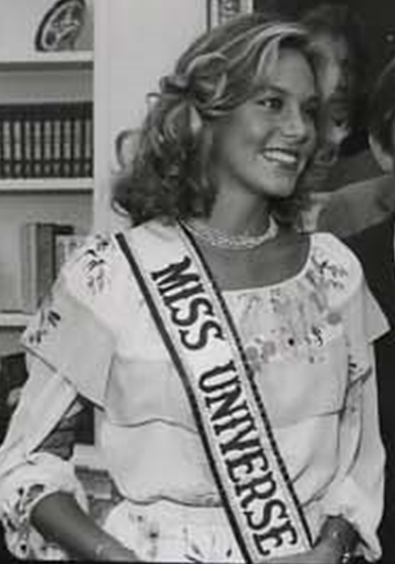
**Miss Universe 1980**
Shawn Weatherly, South Carolina

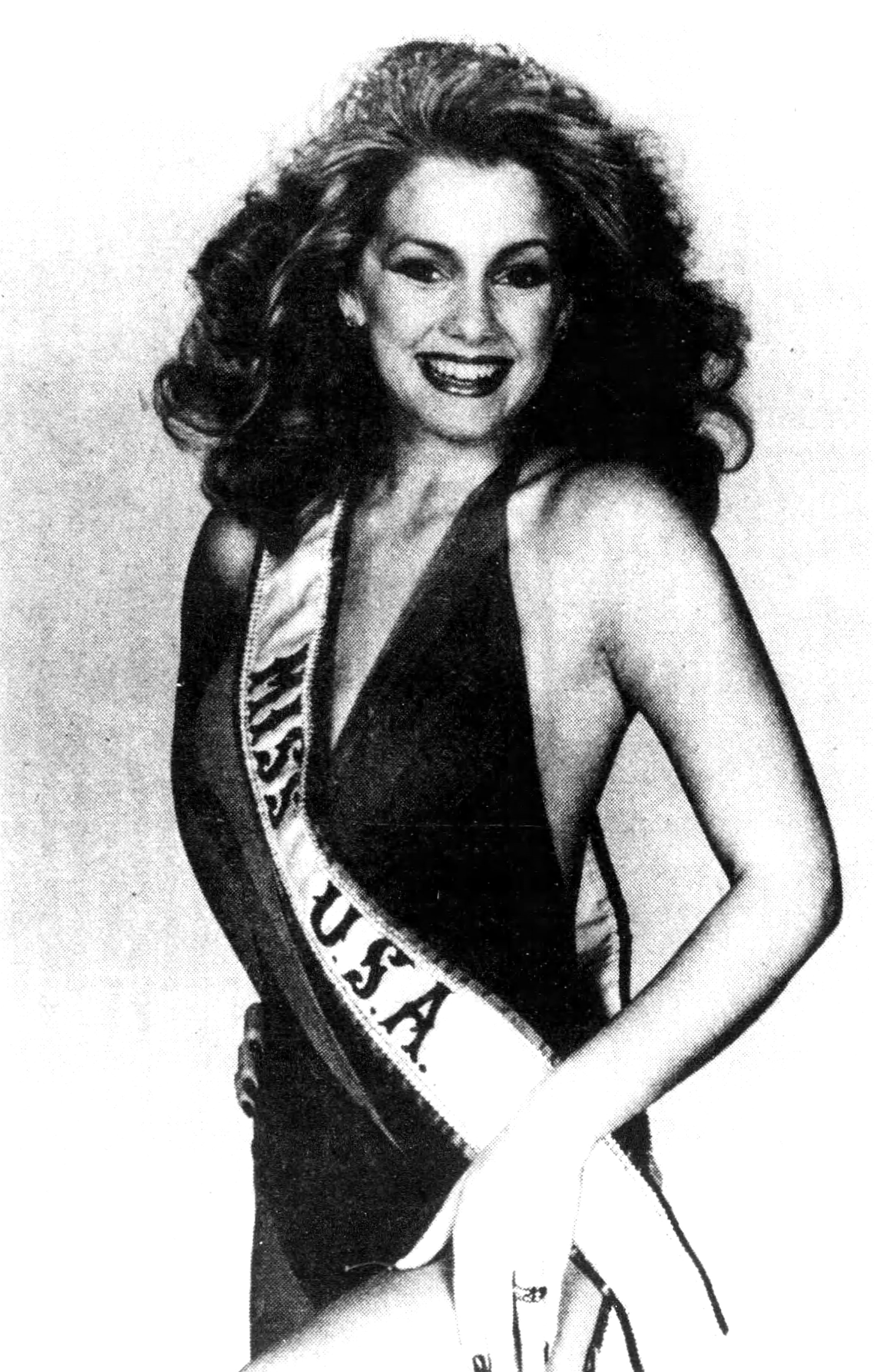
**Miss USA 1980**
Jineane Marie Ford, Arizona
(Became Miss USA after Shawn Weatherly became Miss Universe 1980)

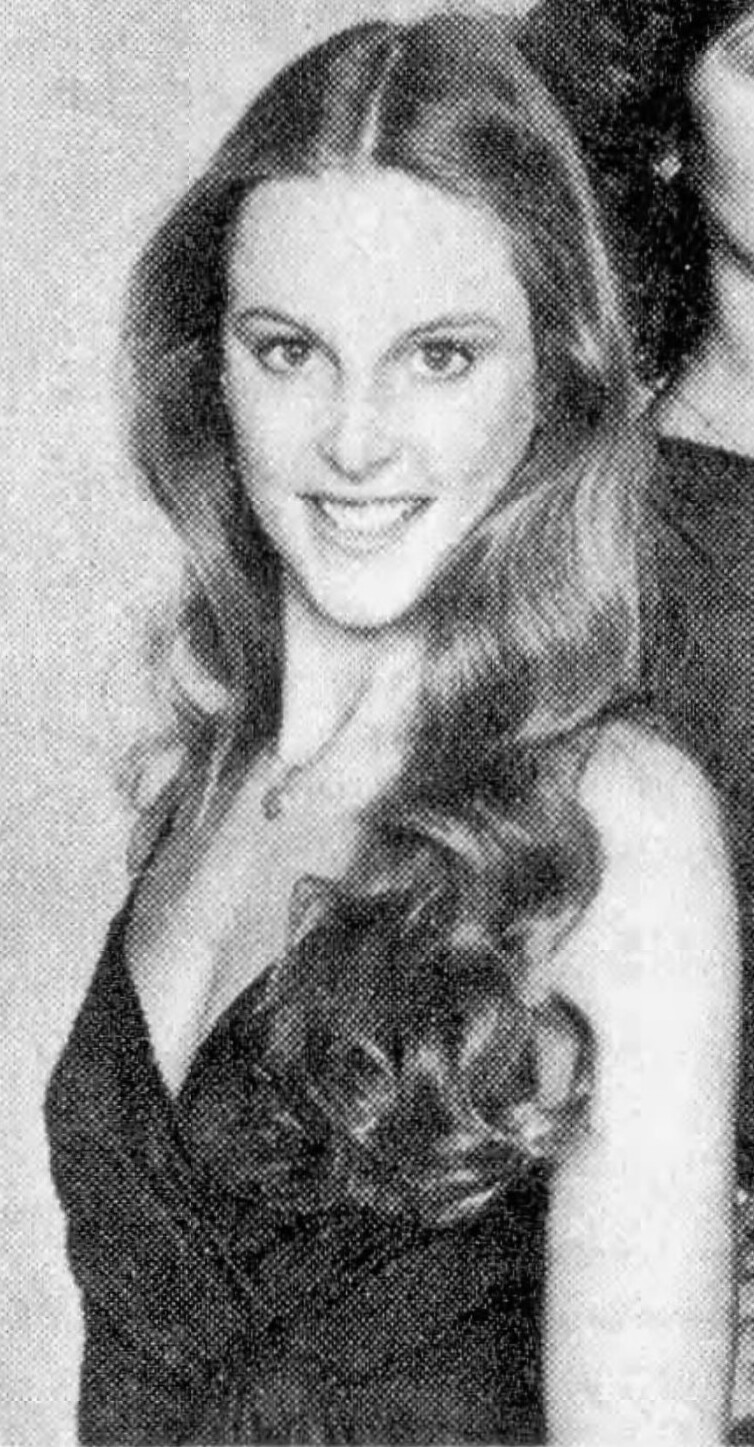
**Miss USA 1979**
Mary Therese Friel, New York

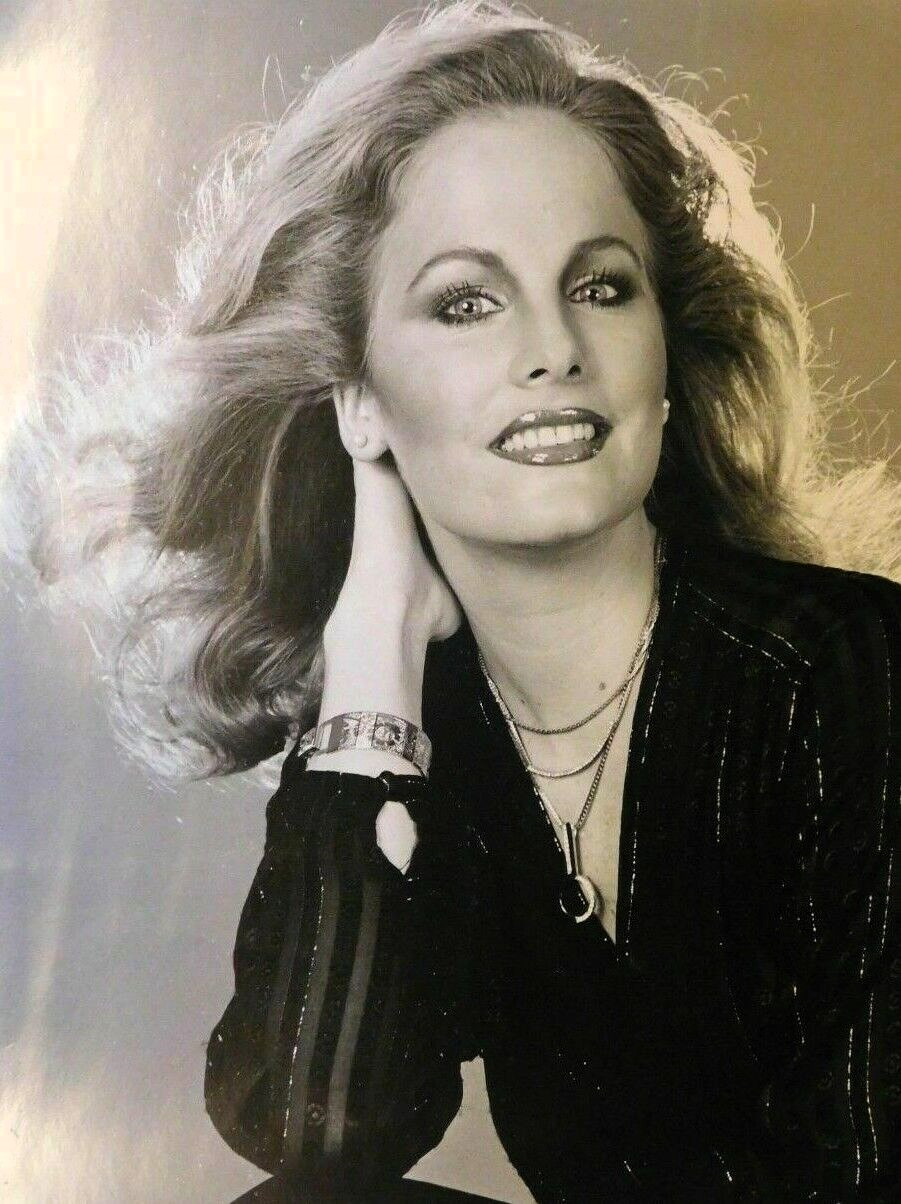
**Miss USA 1978**
Judi Andersen, Hawaii

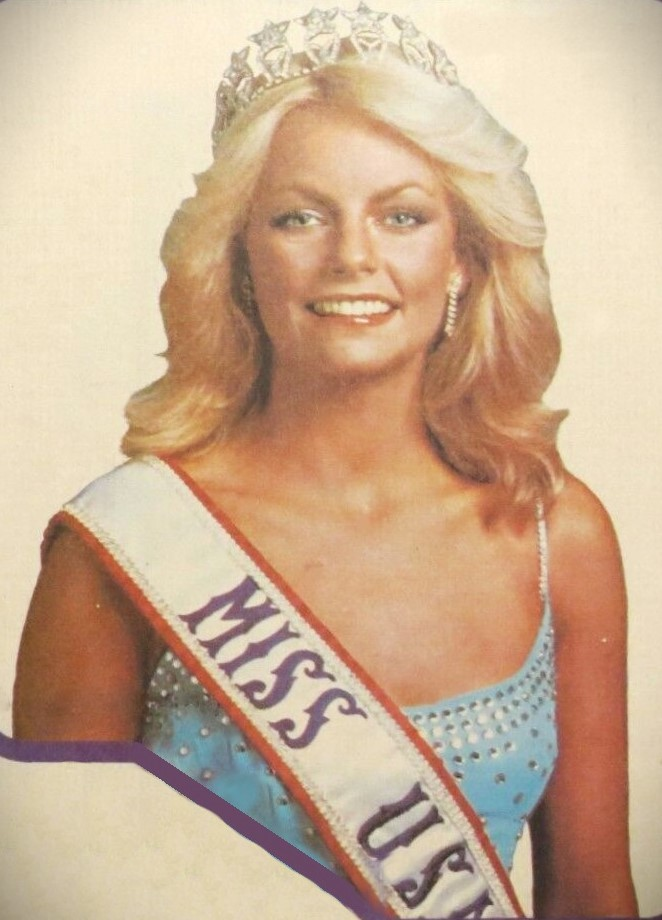
**Miss USA 1977**
Kimberly Tomes, Texas

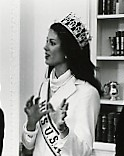
**Miss USA 1976**
Barbara Peterson, Minnesota

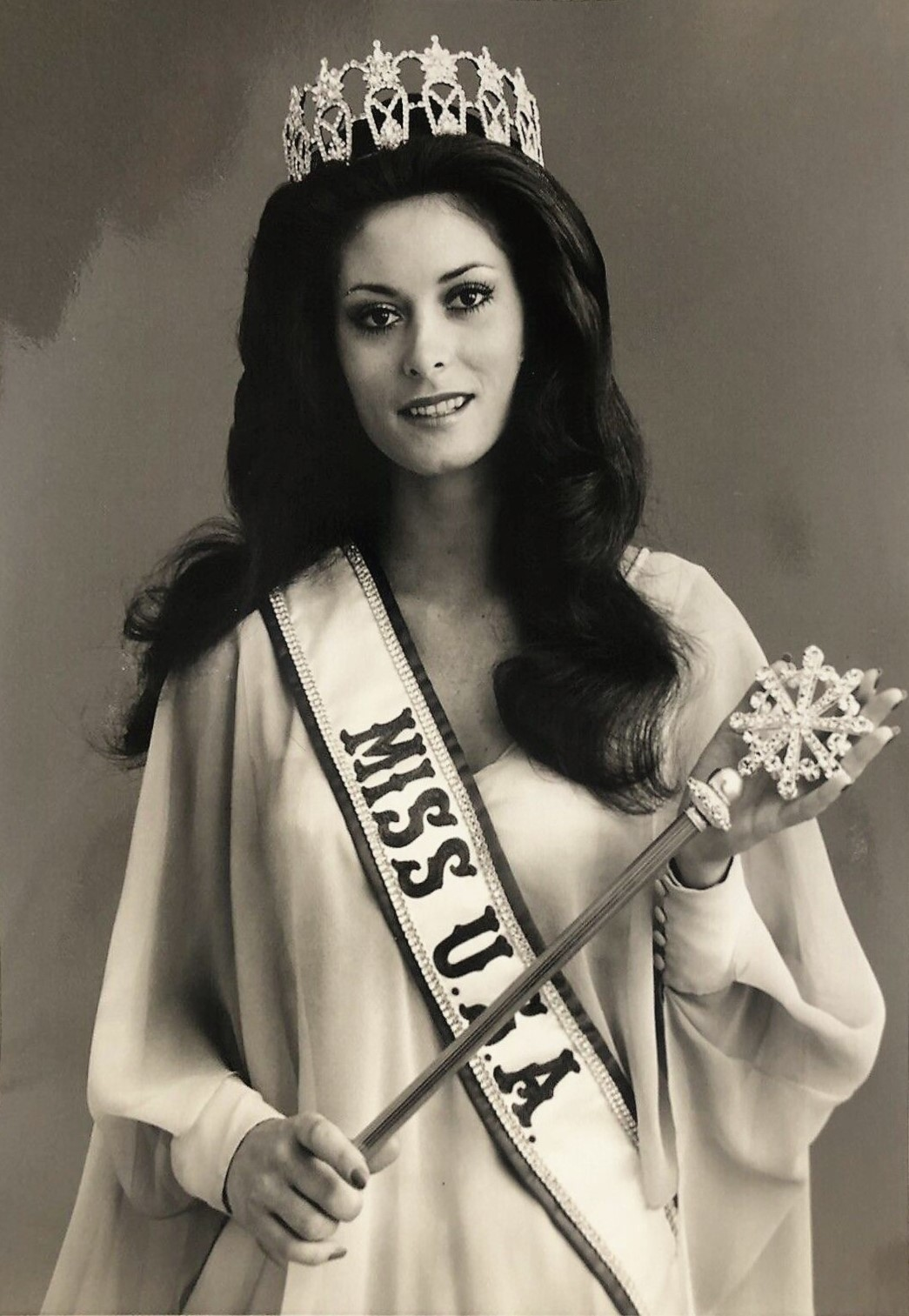
**Miss USA 1975**
Summer Bartholomew, California

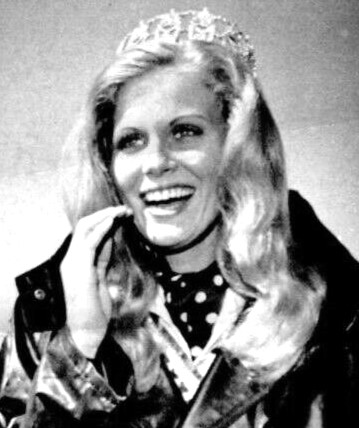
**Miss USA 1974**
Karen Morrison, Illinois

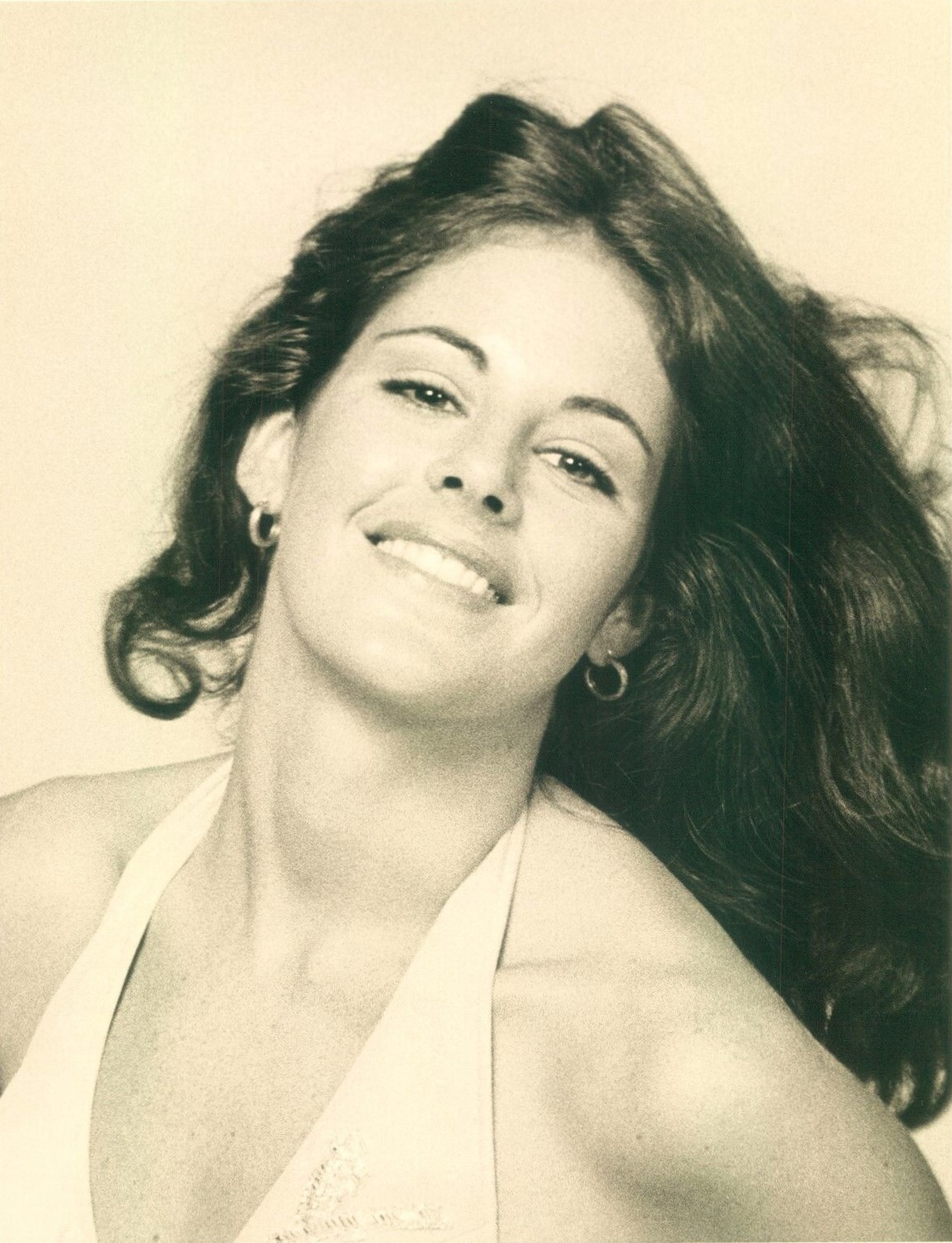
**Miss USA 1973**
Amanda Jones, Illinois

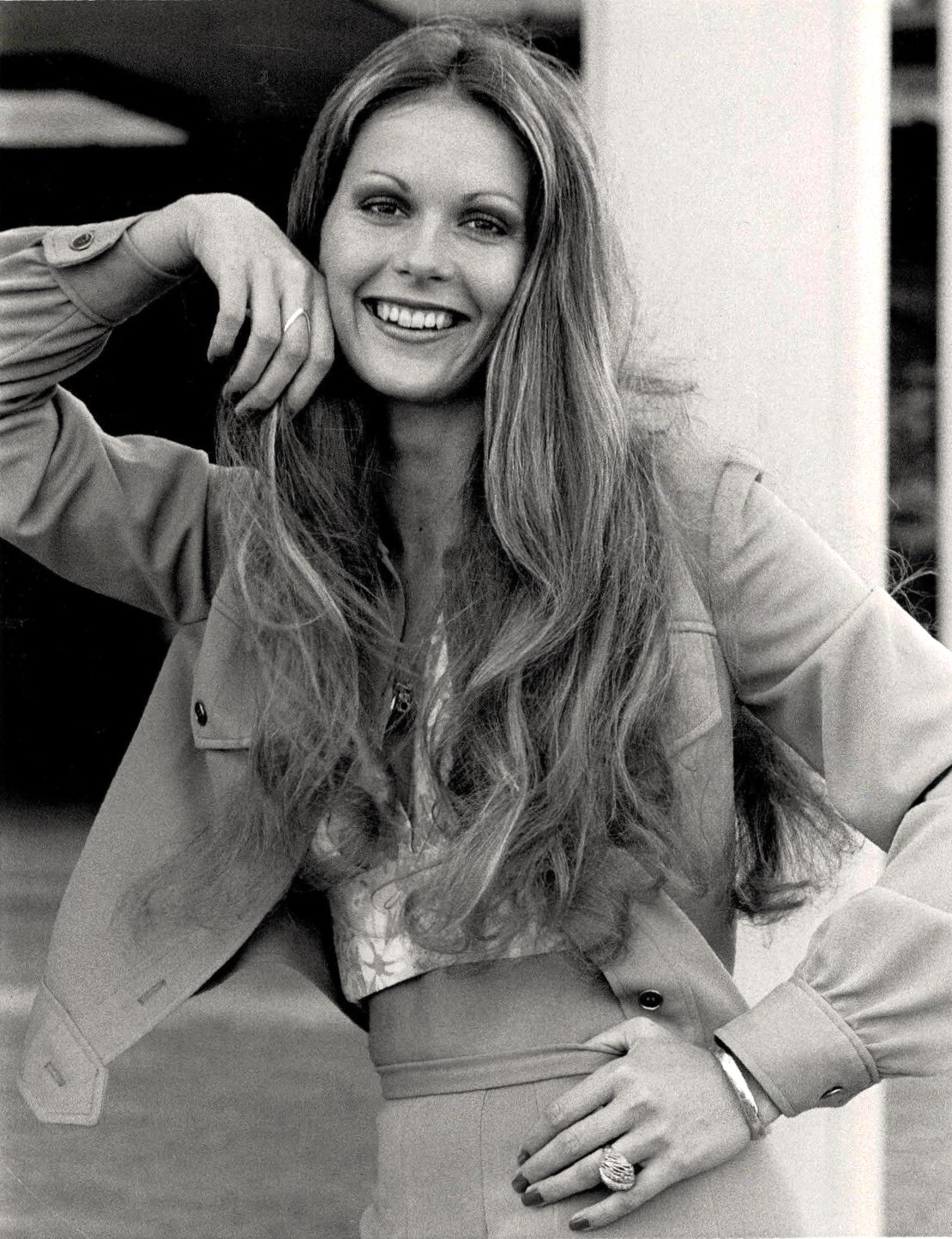
**Miss USA 1972**
Tanya Wilson, Hawaii

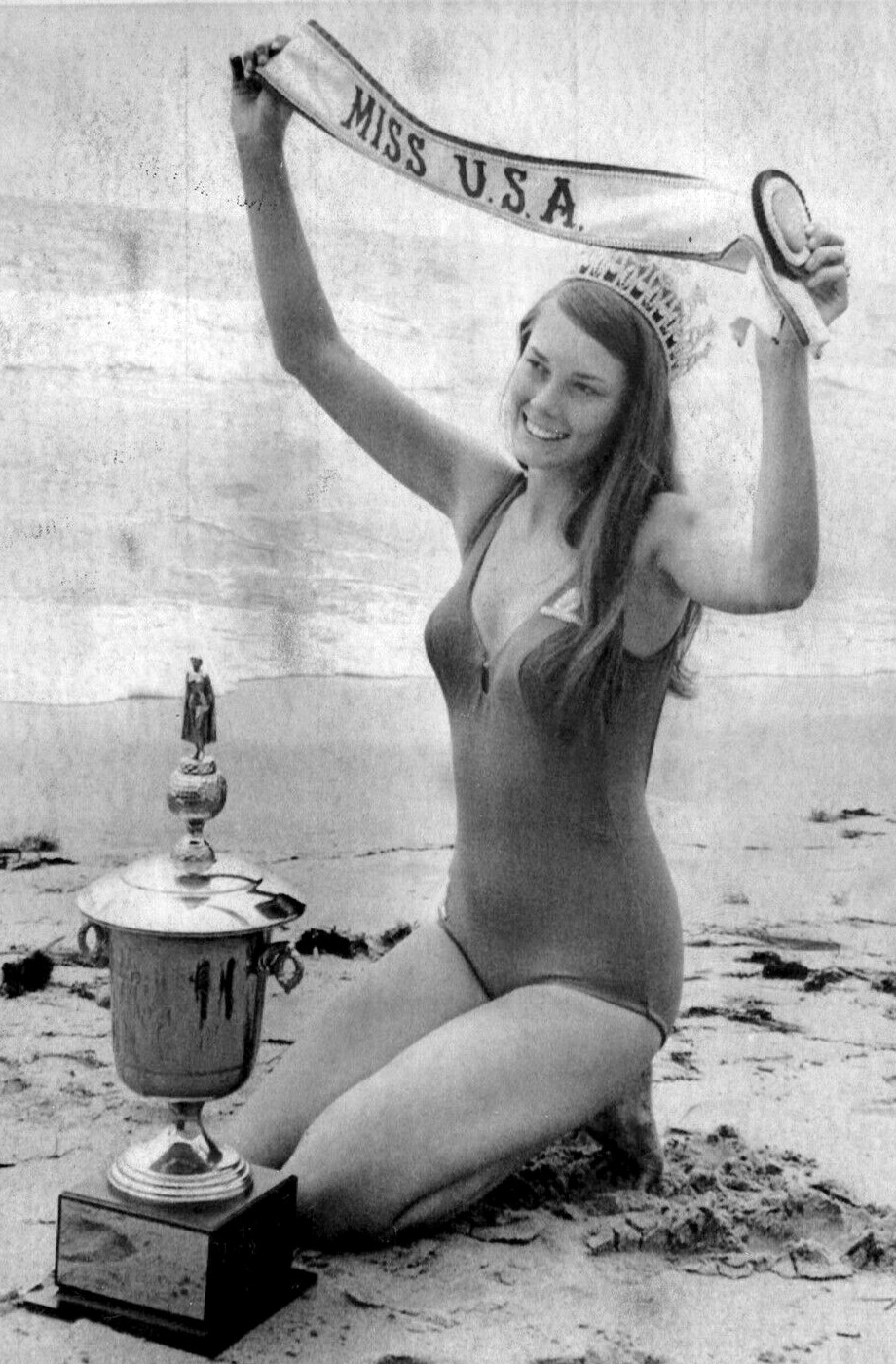
**Miss USA 1971**
Michele McDonald, Pennsylvania

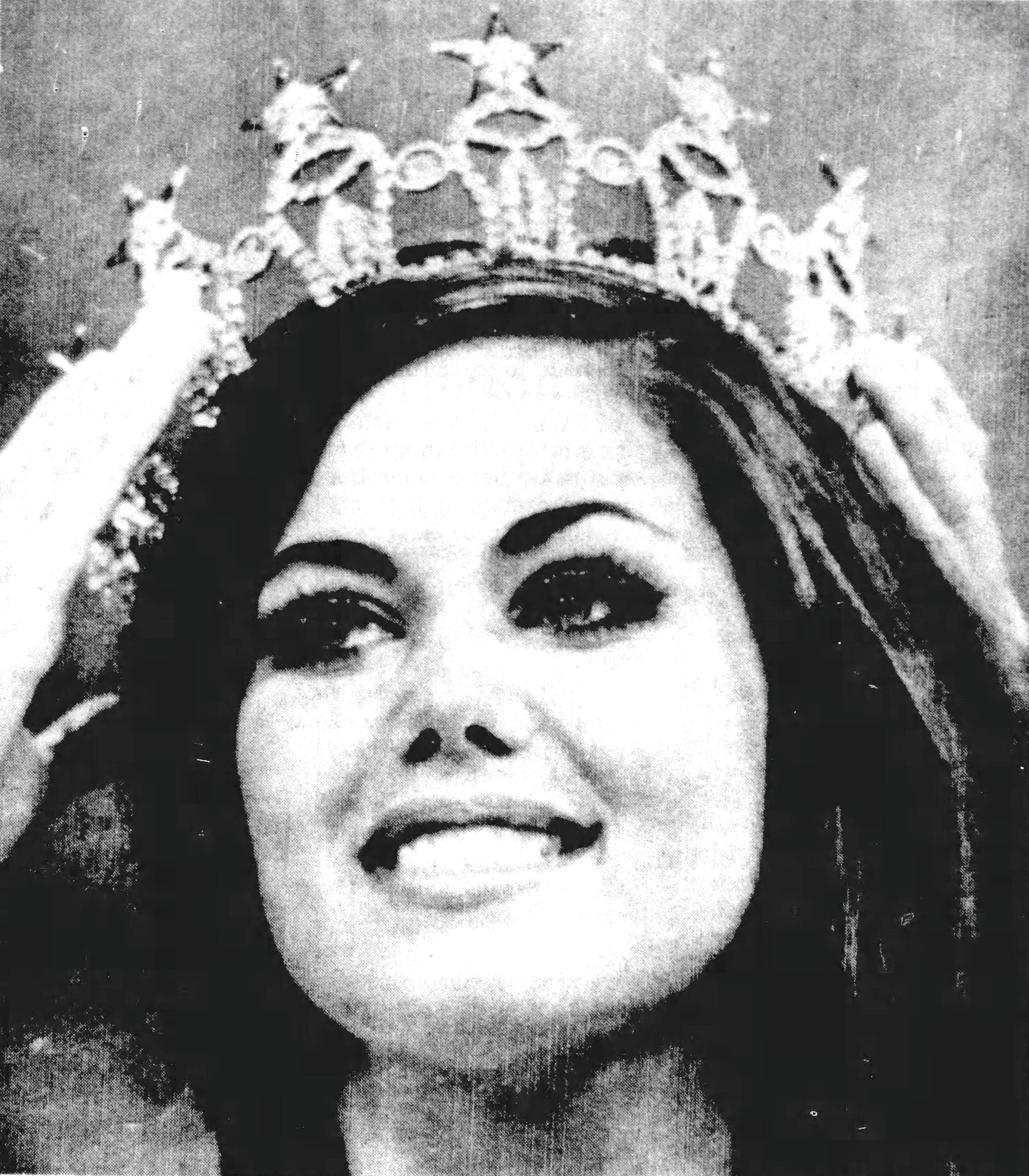
**Miss USA 1970**
Deborah Shelton, Virginia

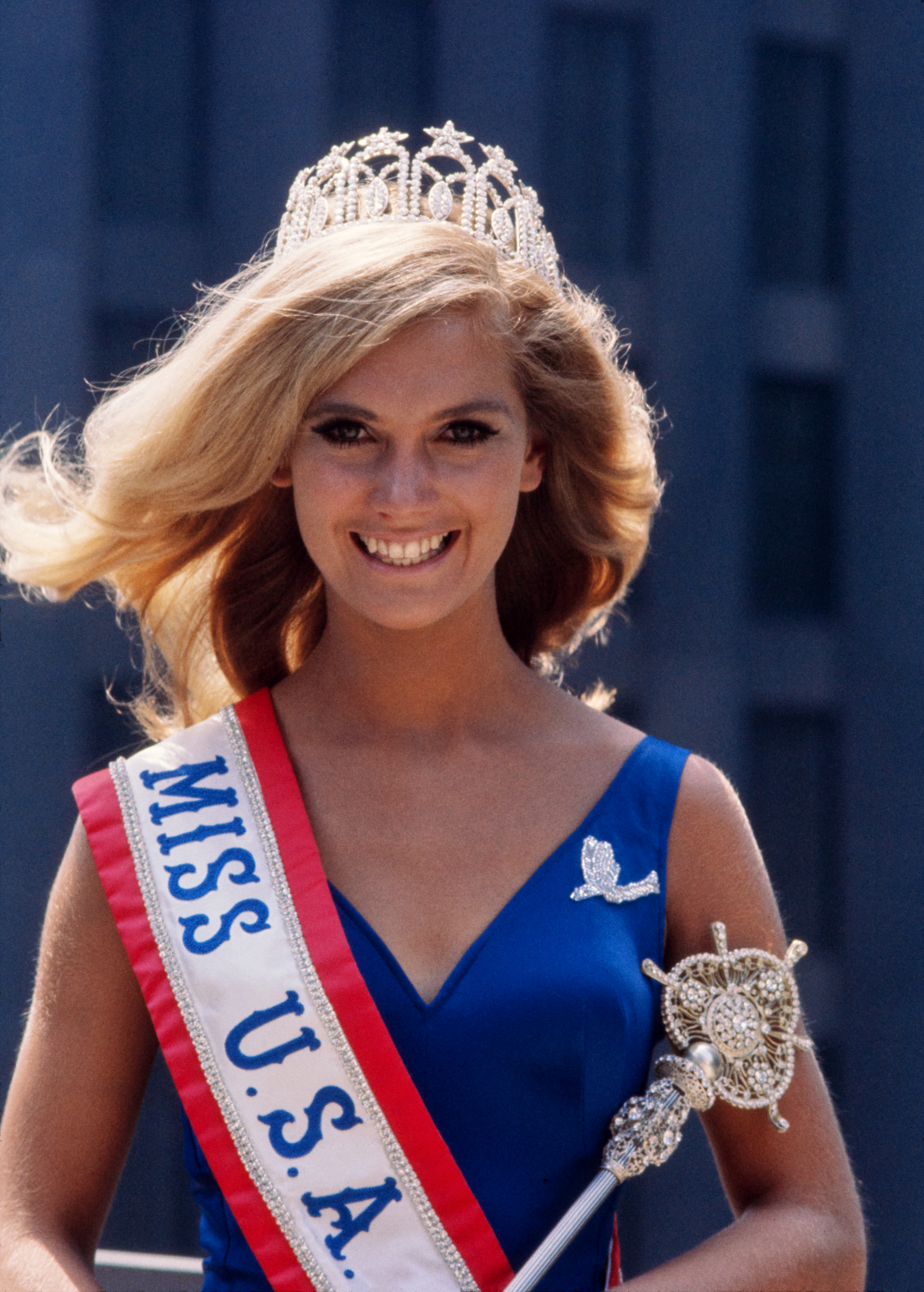
**Miss USA 1969**
Wendy Dascomb, Virginia

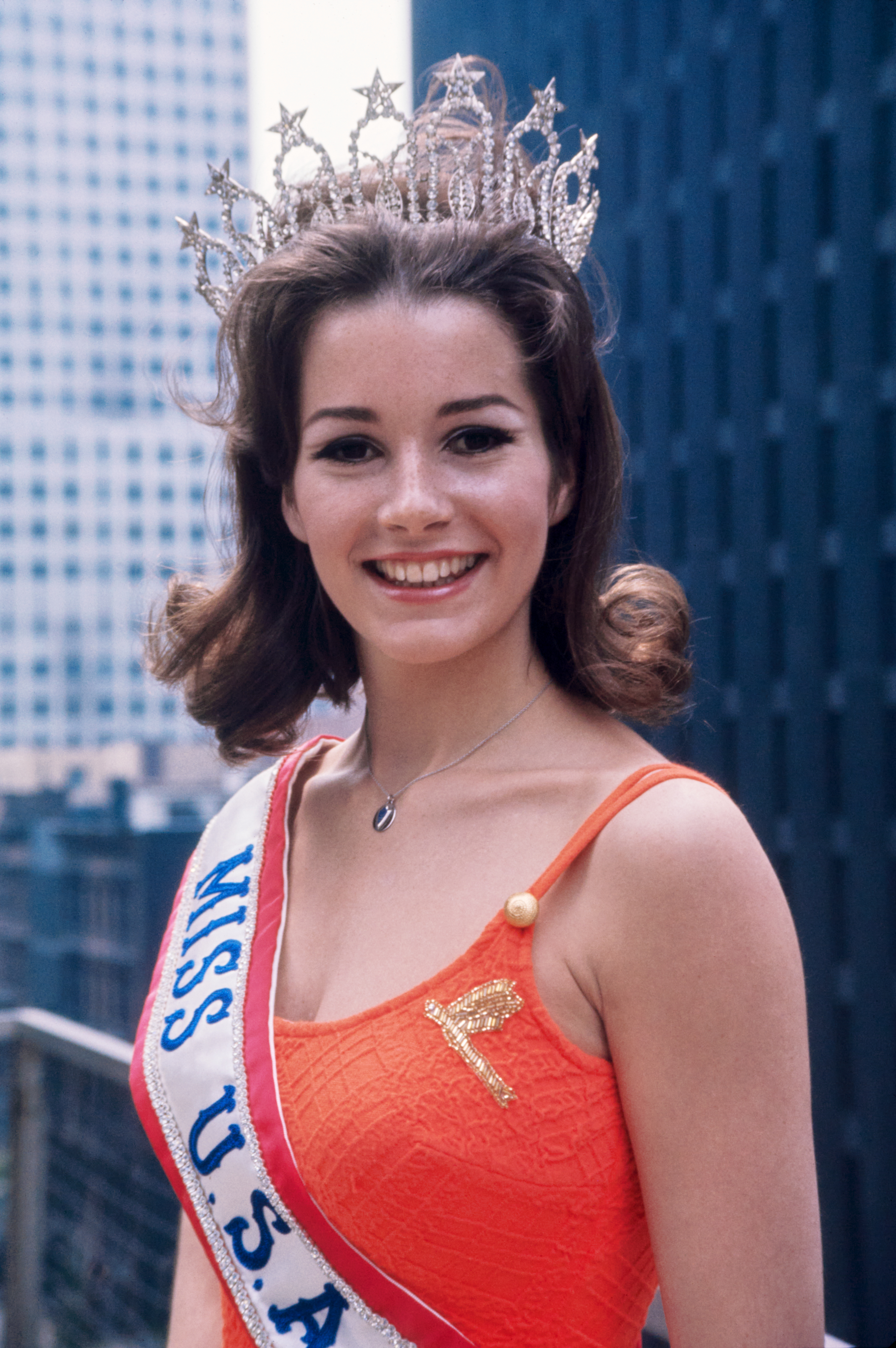
**Miss USA 1968**
Dorothy Anstett, Washington

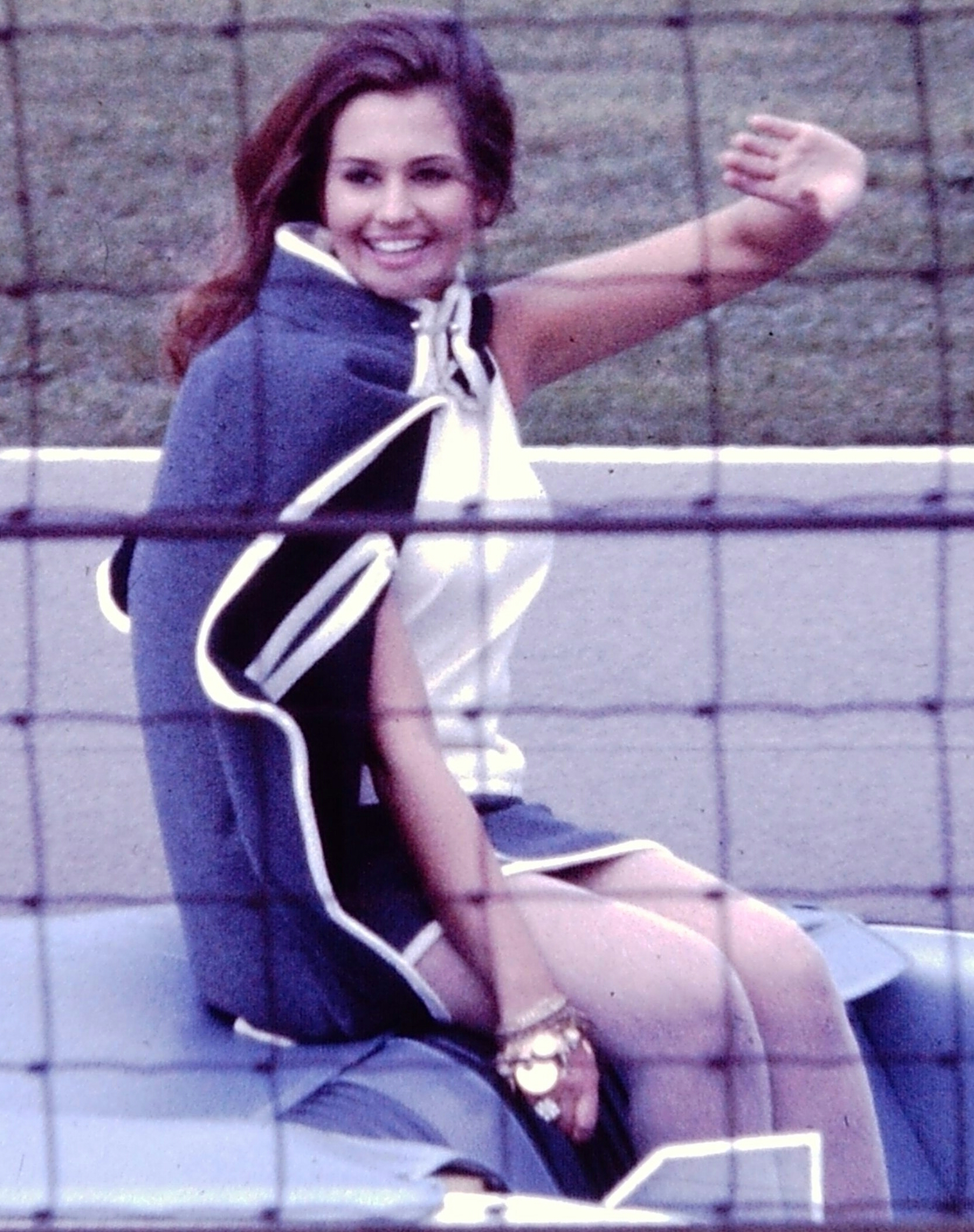
**Miss Universe 1967**
Sylvia Hitchcock, Alabama

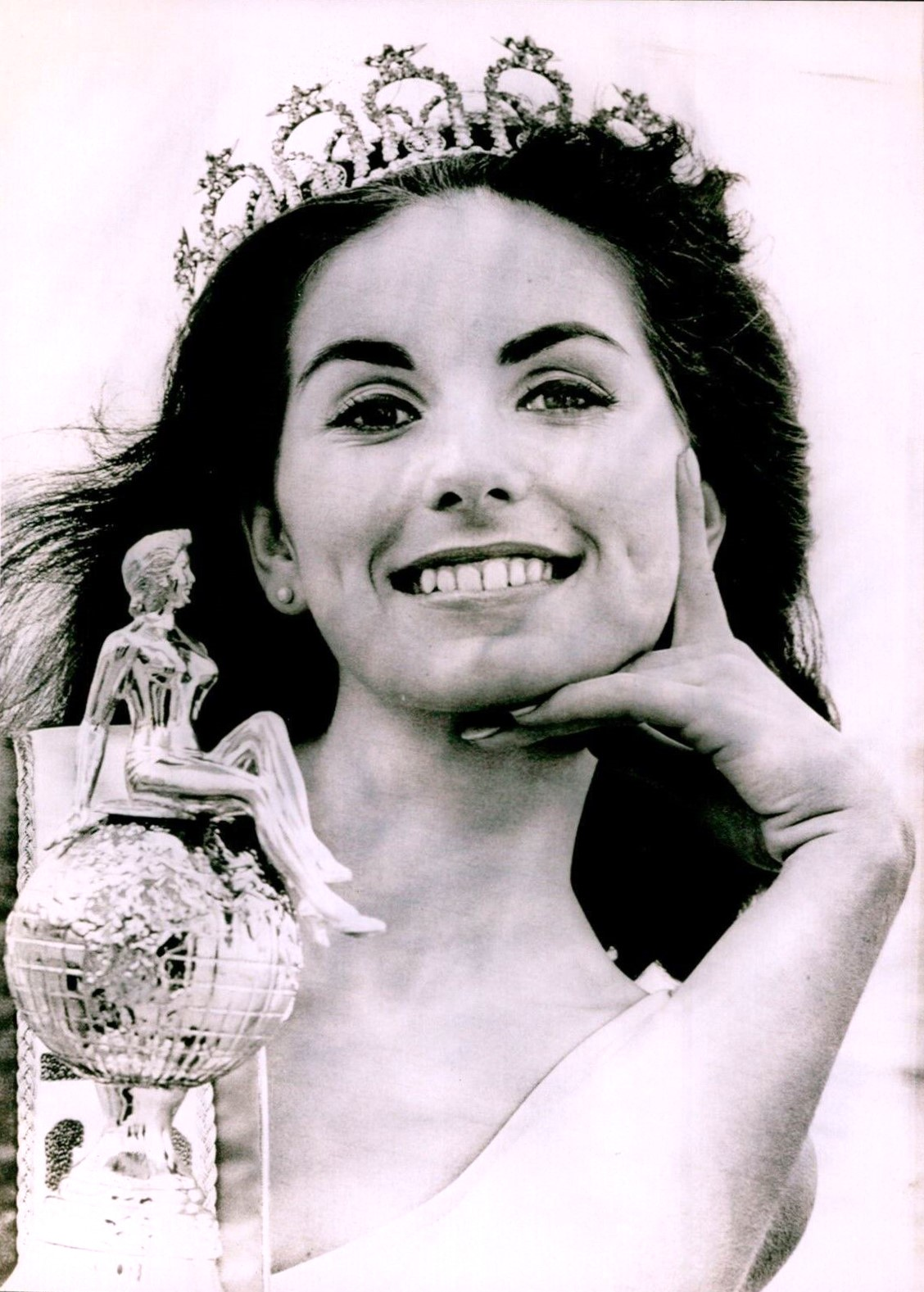
**Miss USA 1966**
Maria Remenyi, California

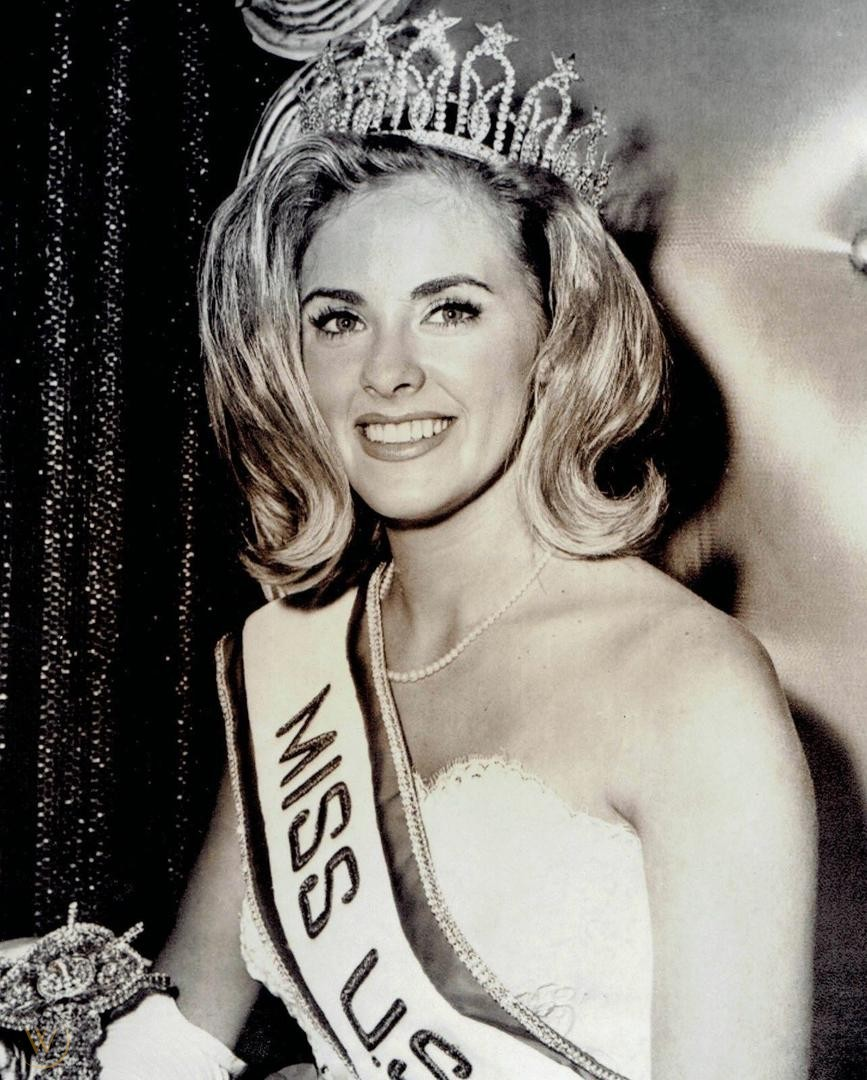
**Miss USA 1965**
Sue Ann Downey, Ohio

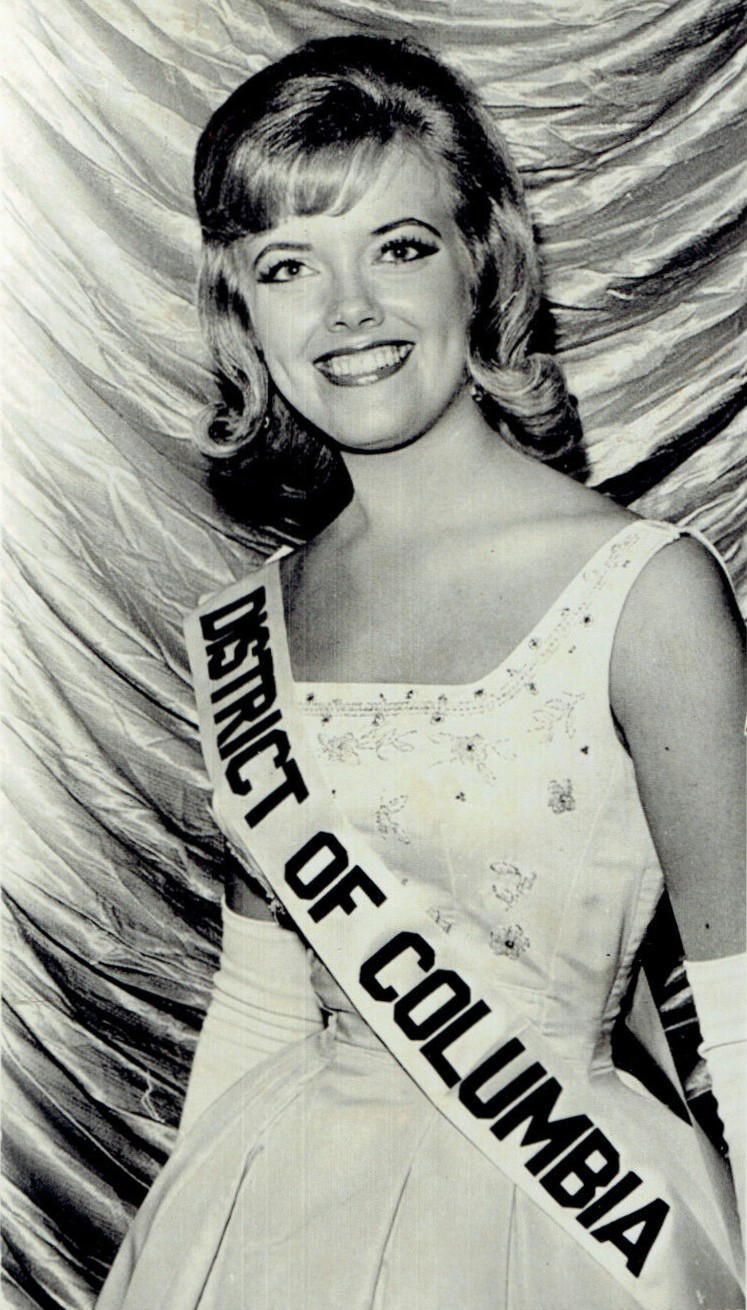
**Miss USA 1964**
Bobbi Johnson, District of Columbia

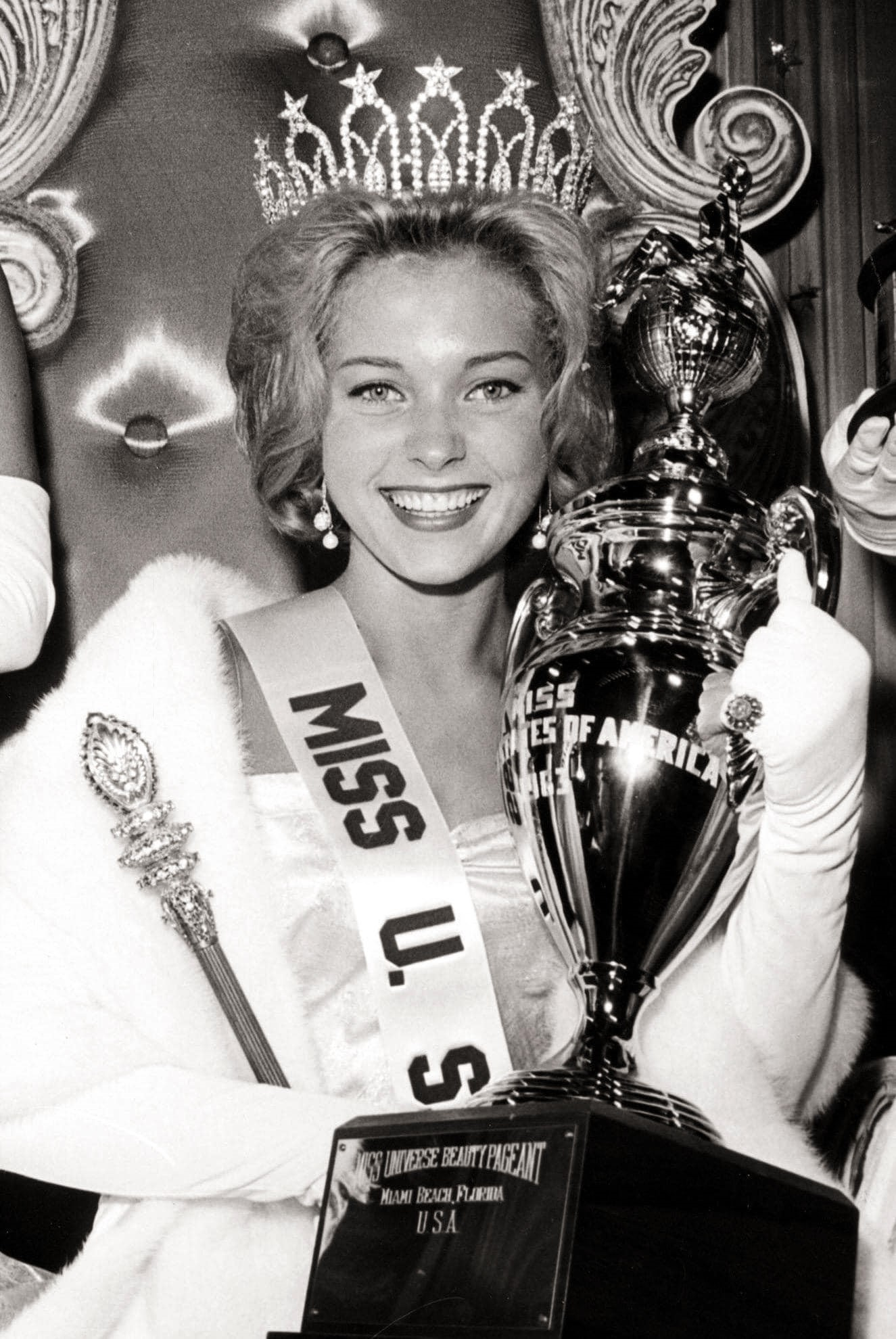
**Miss USA 1963**
Marite Ozers, Illinois

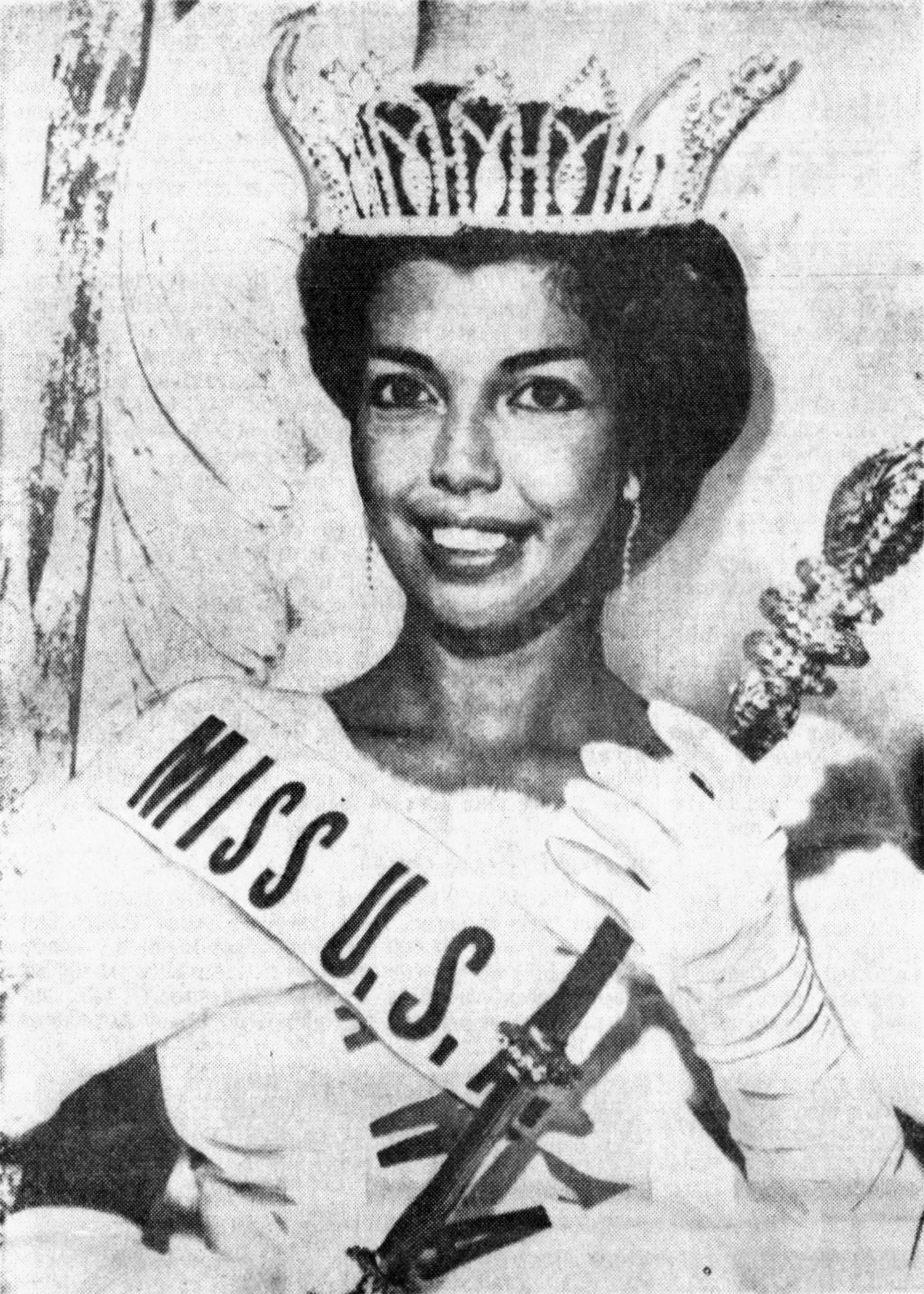
**Miss USA 1962**
Macel Wilson, Hawaii

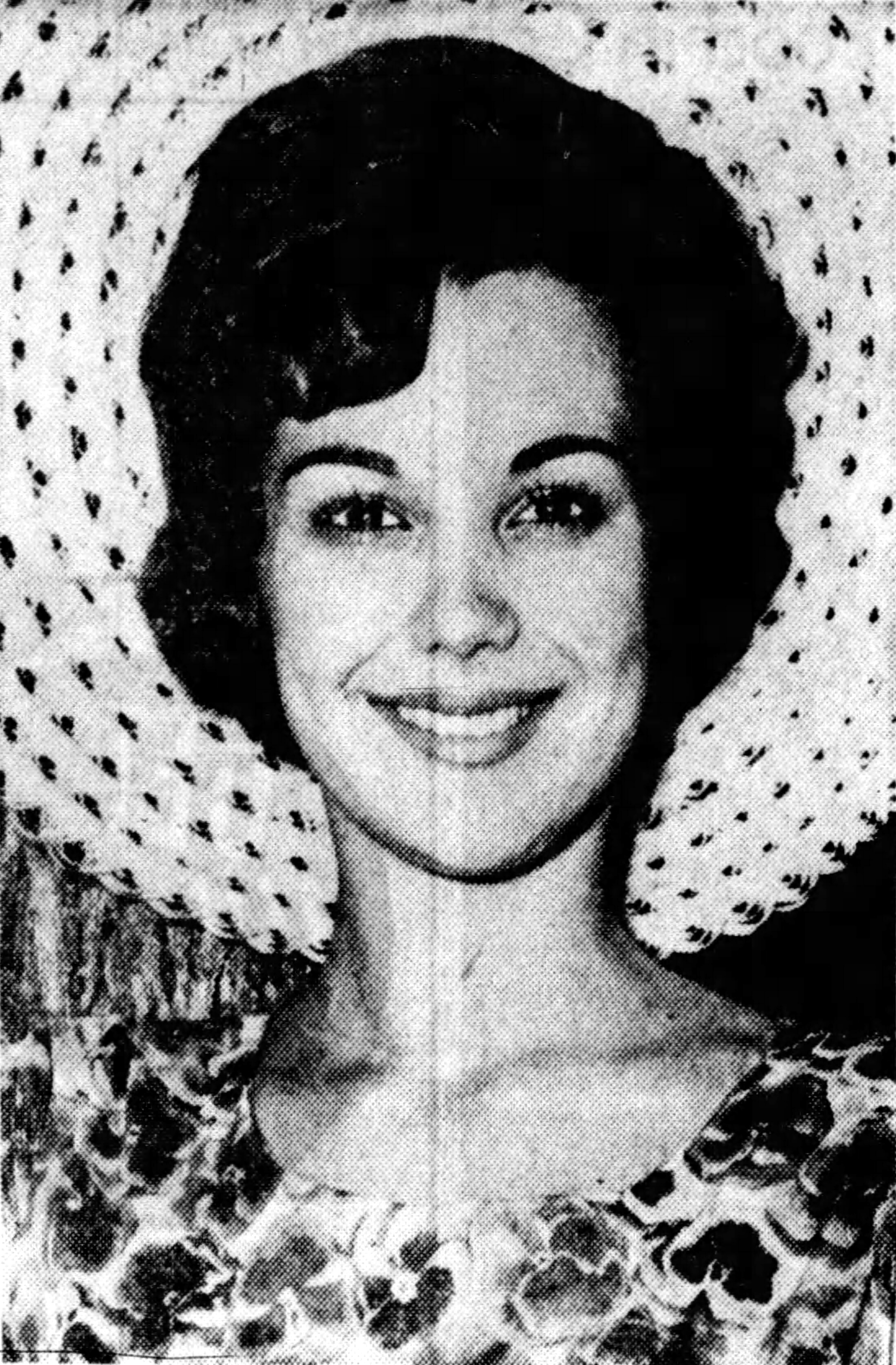
**Miss USA 1961**
Sharon Brown, Louisiana

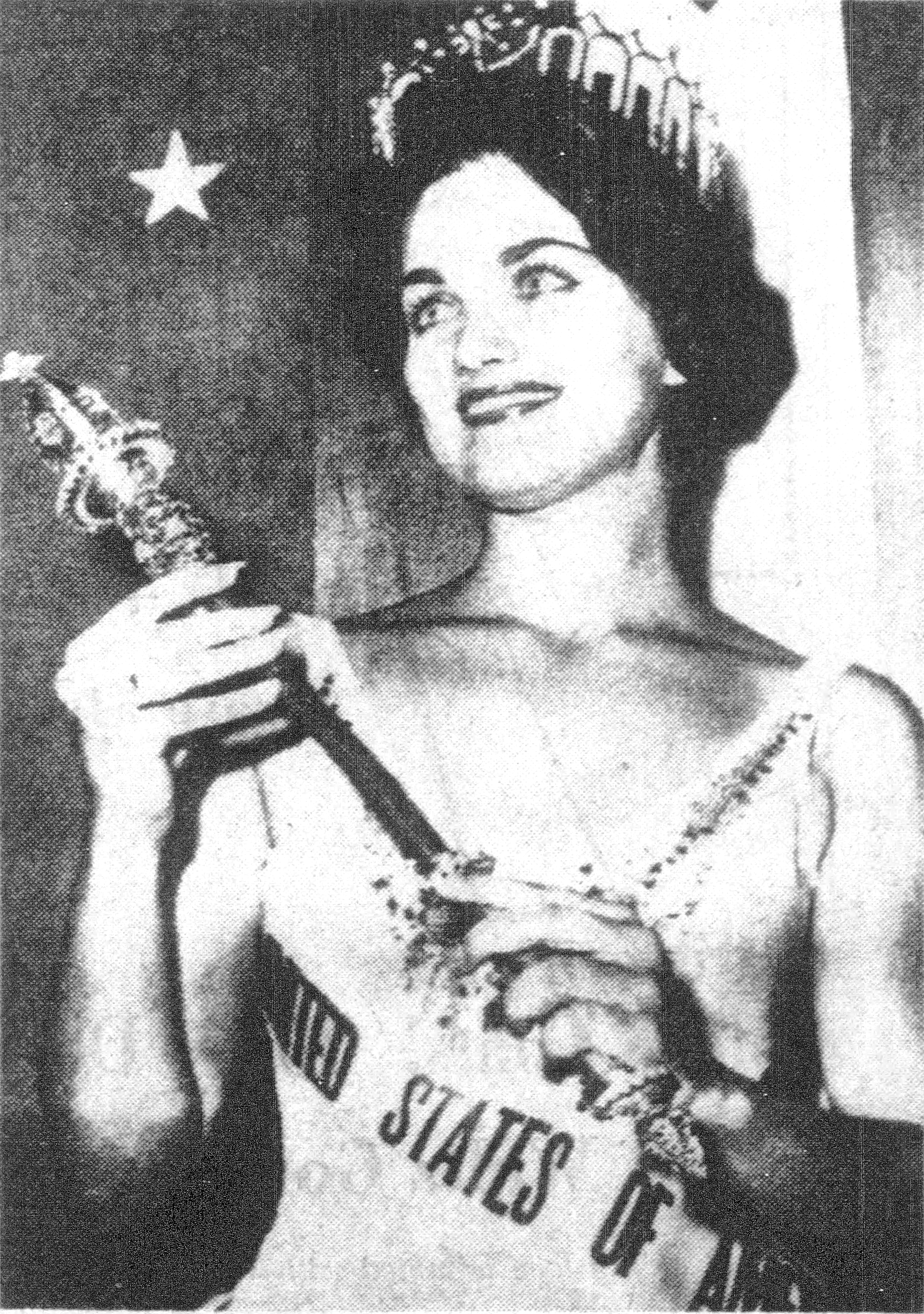
**Miss Universe & Miss USA 1960**
Linda Bement, Utah

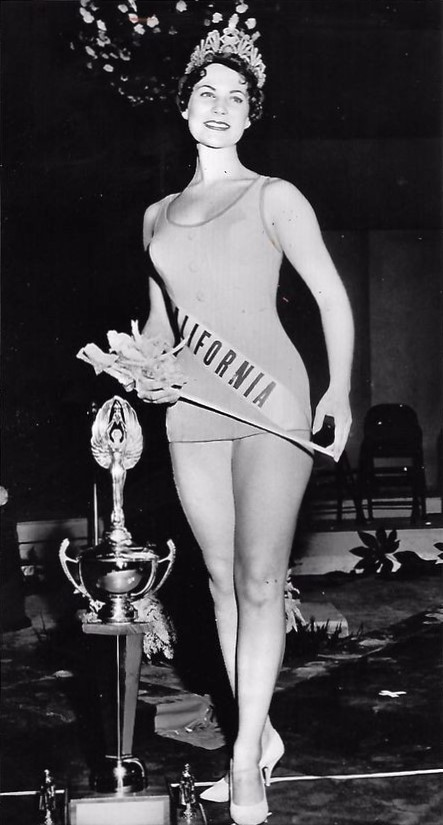
**Miss USA 1959**
Terry Lynn Huntingdon, California

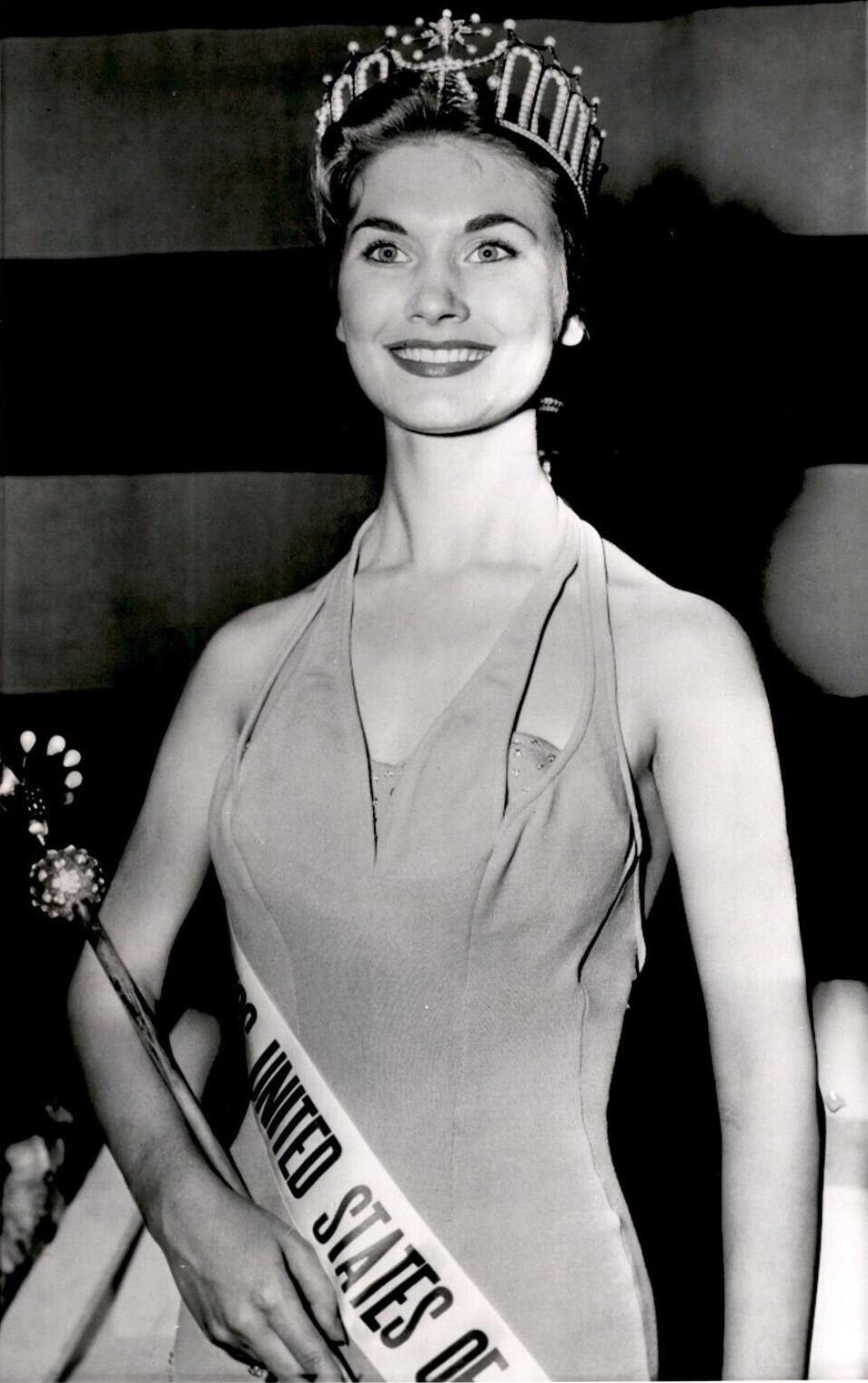
**Miss USA 1958**
Eurlyne Howell, Louisiana

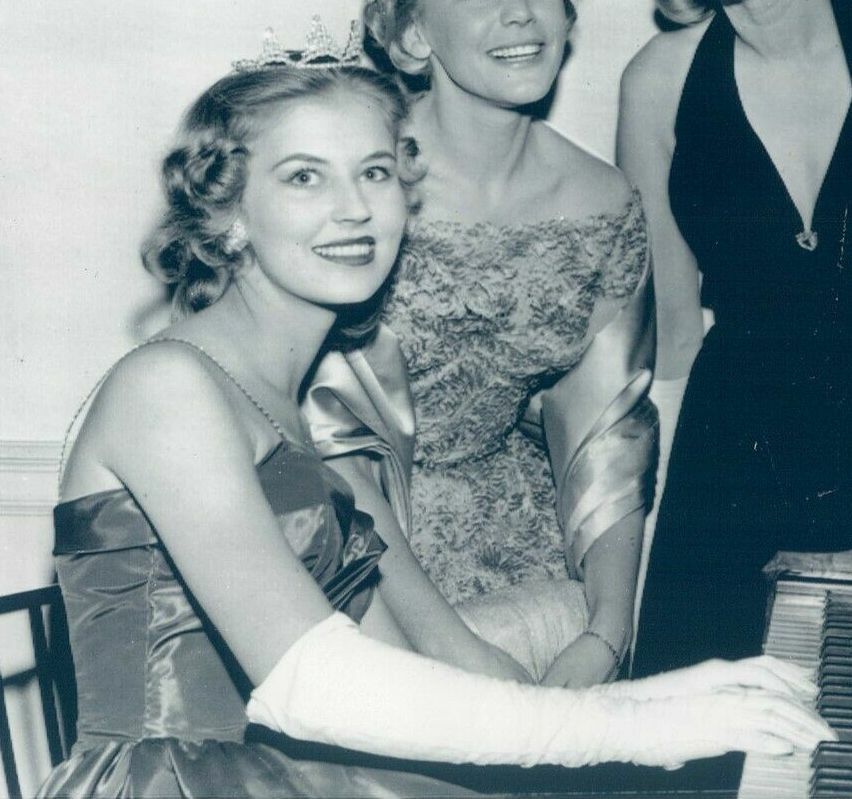
**Miss USA 1957**
Charlotte Sheffield, Utah

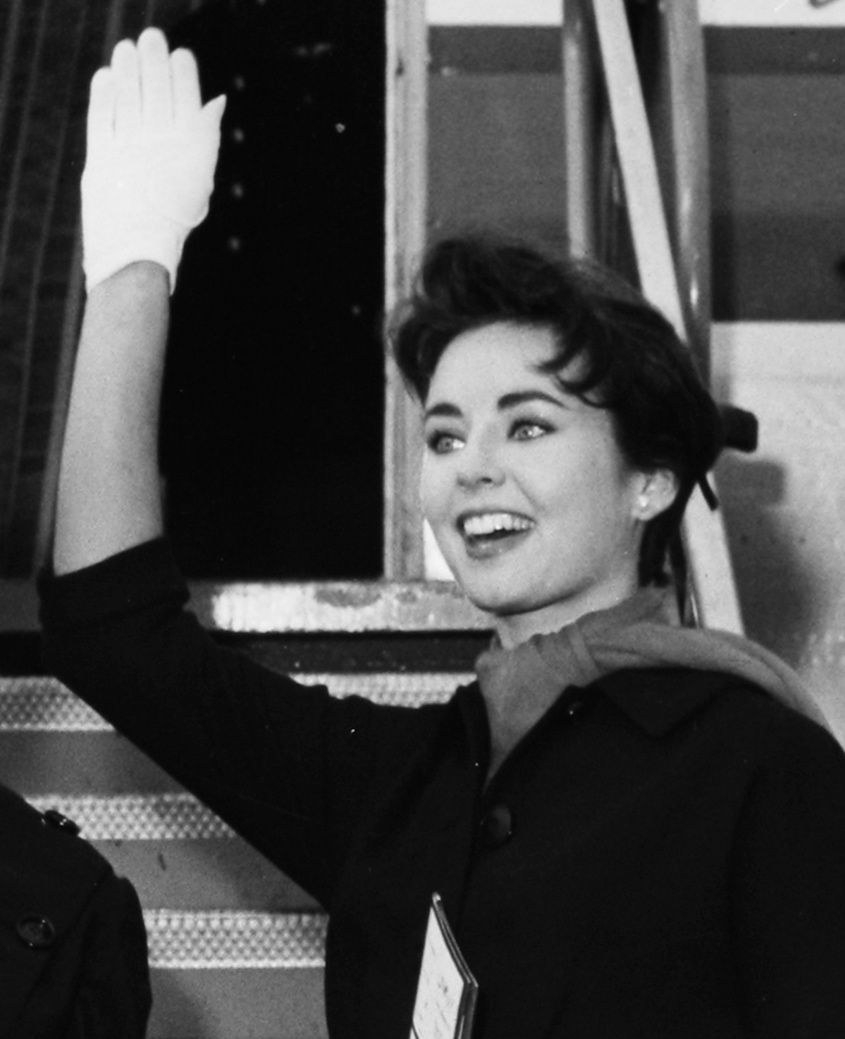
**Miss Universe & Miss USA 1956**
Carol Morris, Iowa

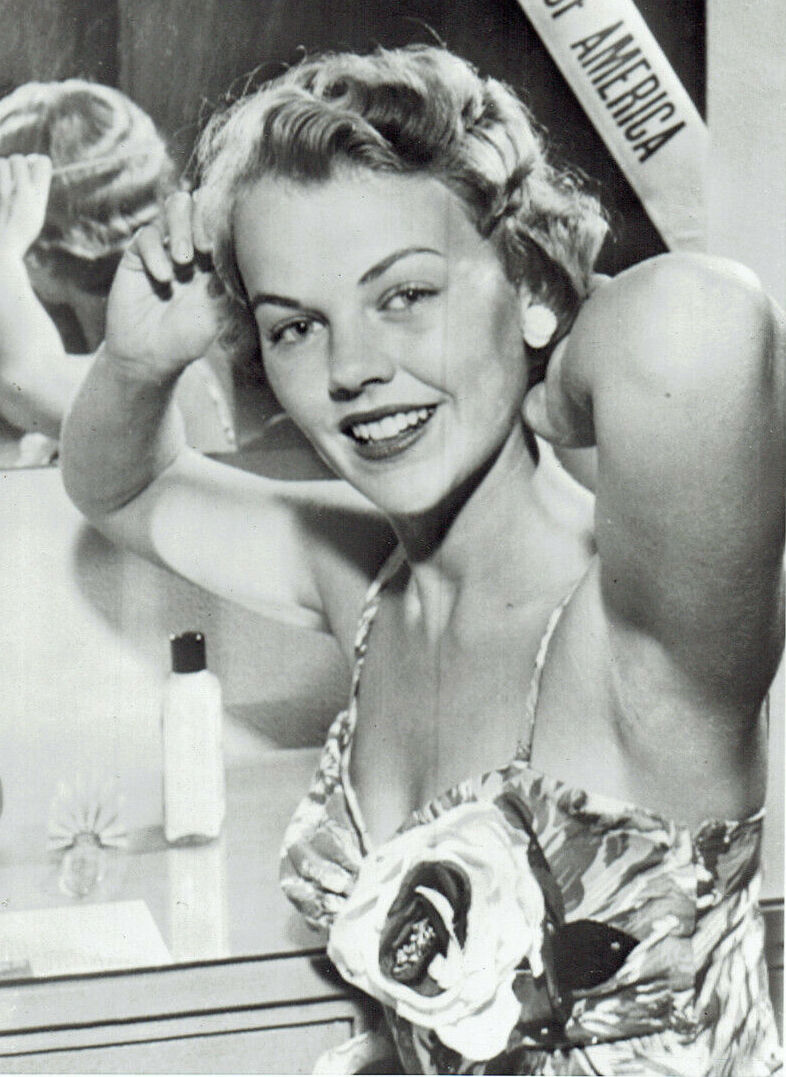
**Miss USA 1955**
Carlene King Johnson, Vermont

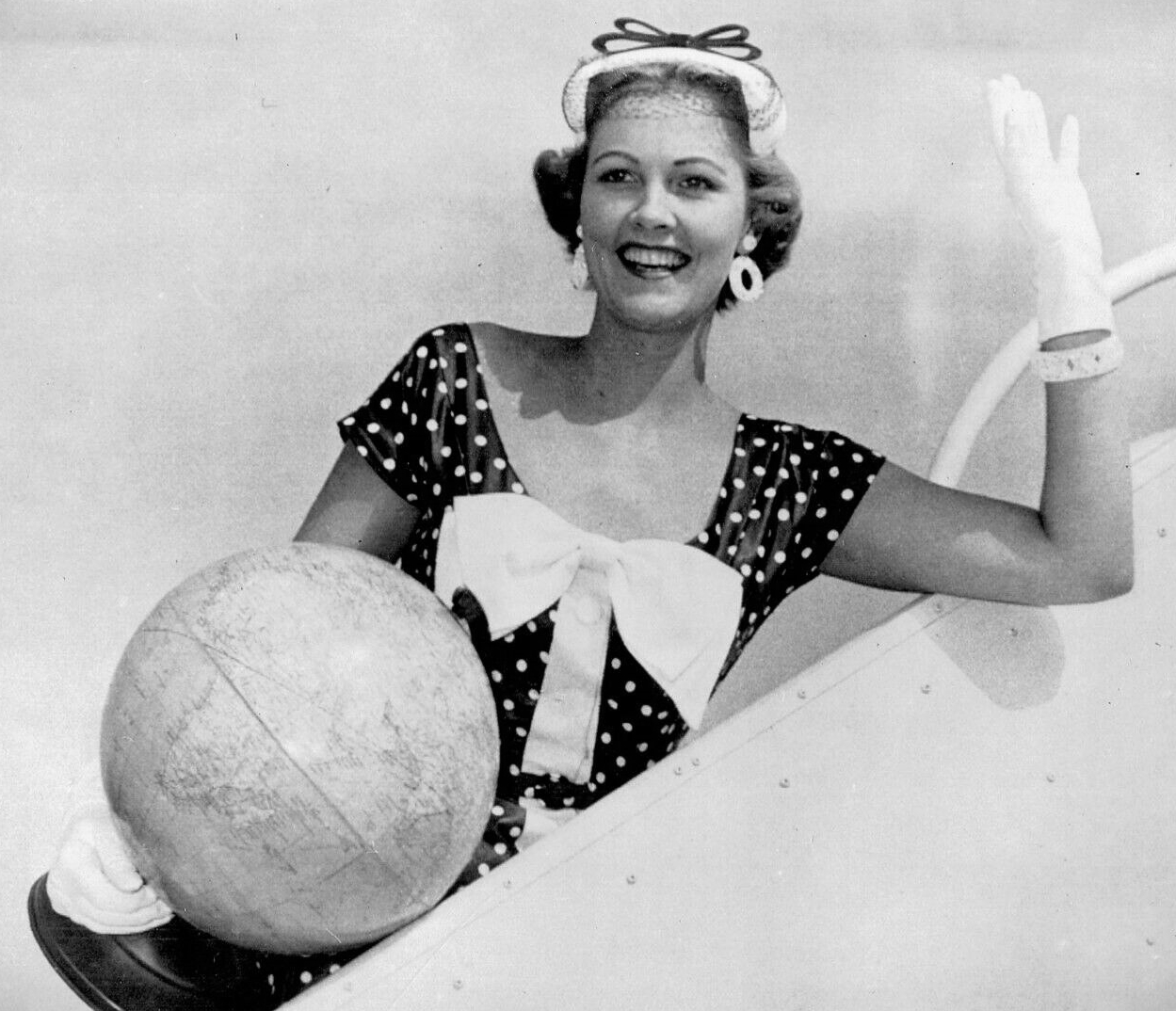
**Miss Universe & Miss USA 1954**
Miriam Stevenson, South Carolina

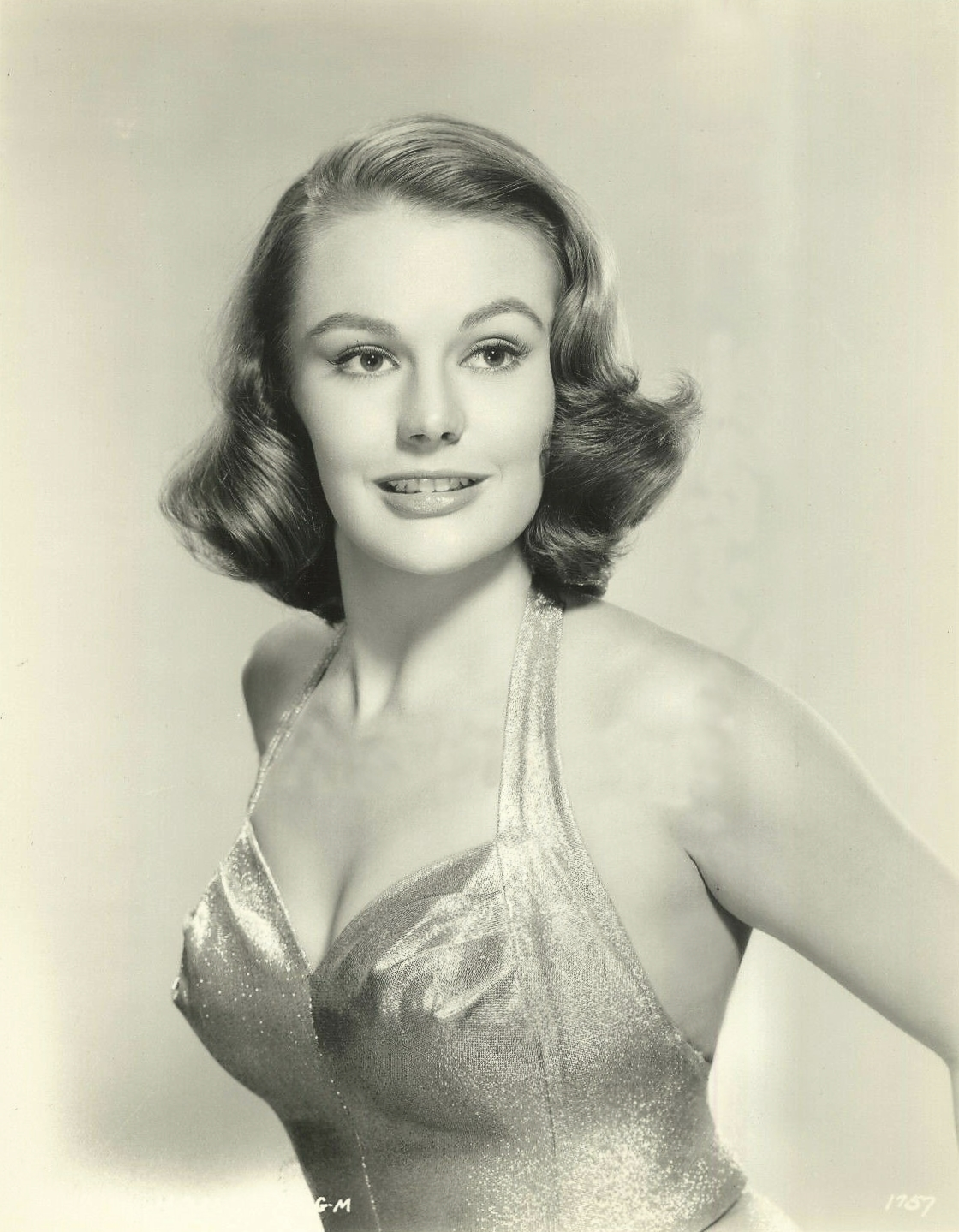
**Miss USA 1953**
Myrna Hansen, Illinois

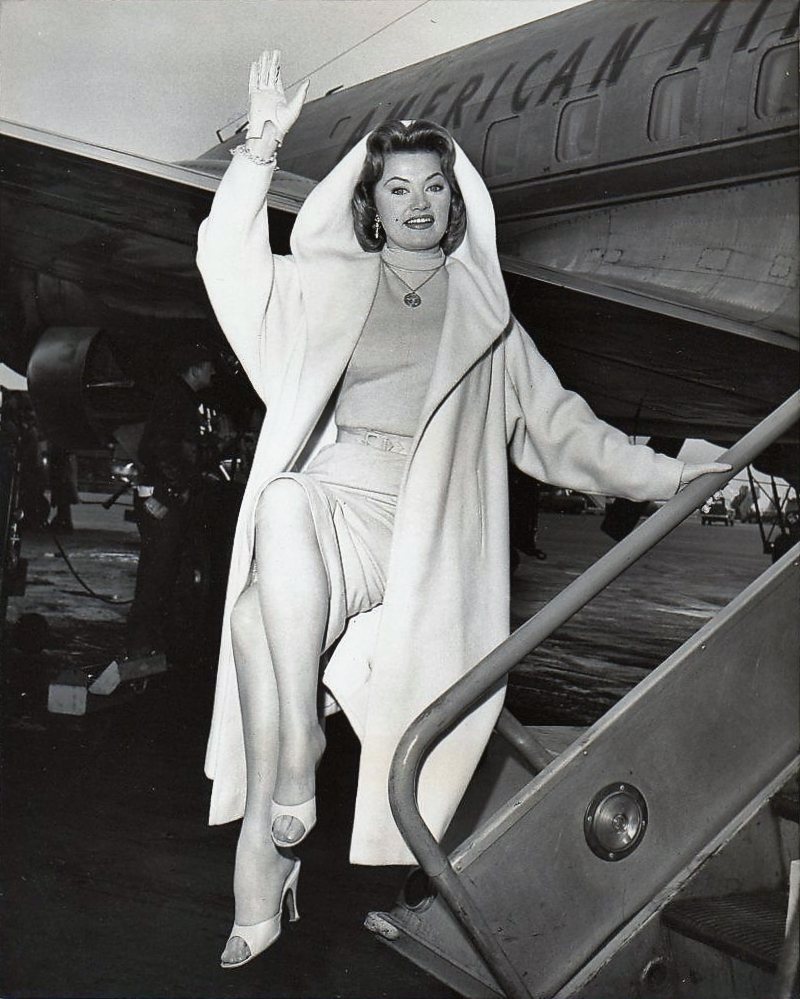
**Miss USA 1952**
Jackie Loughery, New York

=== Winners by state ===
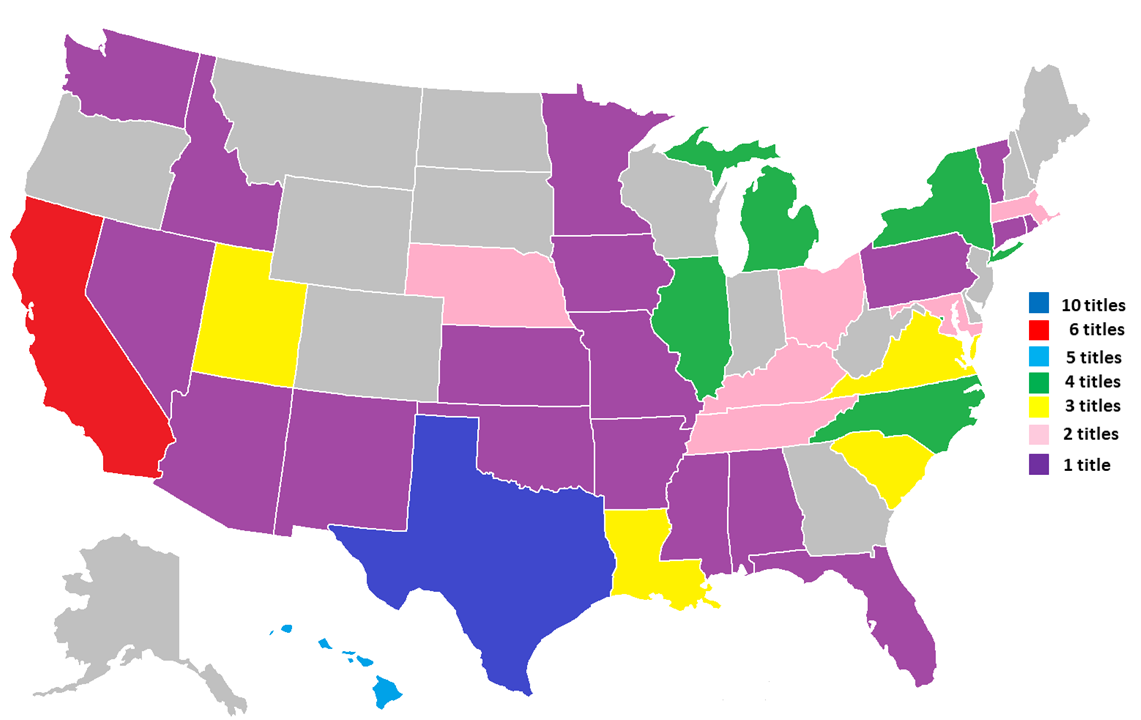
Miss USA winners by state (Note: Map includes titleholders who were dethroned or resigned and runners-up who assumed the title after the original winner was dethroned or resigned)

| State | Number | Years |
|---|---|---|
| **Texas** | 10 | 1977; 1985; 1986; 1987; 1988; 1989; **1995** (Note: Relinquished the title to a runner-up after winning Miss Universe); 2001; 2008; **2022** |
| **California** | 6 | 1959; 1966; 1975; 1983; 1992; 2011 |
| **Hawaii** | 5 | 1962; 1972; 1978; **1997**; 2023 (Note: Originally 1st Runner-Up and assumed the Miss USA title when the original winner resigned) |
| **Michigan** | 4 | 1990; 1993; 2010; 2024 |
| **North Carolina** | 4 | 2005; 2009; 2019; 2022 (Note: Originally 1st Runner-Up and assumed the Miss USA title when the original winner was crowned Miss Universe) |
| (Washington, D.C.) **District of Columbia** | 4 | 1964; 2002; 2016; 2017 |
| (New York (state)) **New York** | 4 | 1952; 1979; 1995; 1999 |
| **Illinois** | 4 | 1953; 1963; 1973; 1974 |
| **Virginia** | 3 | 1969; 1970; 2026 |
| **Utah** | 3 | 1957 (Note: Originally 1st Runner-Up and assumed the Miss USA title when the original winner was dethroned); **1960**; 2023 (Note: Resigned title) |
| **Louisiana** | 3 | 1958; 1961; 1996 |
| **South Carolina** | 3 | **1954**; **1980**; 1994 |
| **Nebraska** | 2 | 2018; 2025 |
| **Kentucky** | 2 | 2006; 2021 |
| **Maryland** | 2 | 1957 (Note: Dethroned by pageant officials for breaking pageant protocol, and the title was passed to a runner-up); 2012 |
| **Tennessee** | 2 | 2000; 2007 |
| **Massachusetts** | 2 | 1998; 2003 |
| **Ohio** | 2 | 1965; 1981 |
| **Mississippi** | 1 | 2020 |
| **Oklahoma** | 1 | 2015 |
| **Nevada** | 1 | 2014 |
| **Connecticut** | 1 | 2013 |
| **Rhode Island** | 1 | **2012** |
| **Missouri** | 1 | 2004 |
| **Idaho** | 1 | 1997 |
| **Kansas** | 1 | 1991 |
| **New Mexico** | 1 | 1984 |
| **Arkansas** | 1 | 1982 |
| **Arizona** | 1 | 1980 |
| **Minnesota** | 1 | 1976 |
| **Pennsylvania** | 1 | 1971 |
| (Washington (state)) **Washington** | 1 | 1968 |
| **Alabama** | 1 | **1967** |
| **Florida** | 1 | 1967 (Note: Originally 2nd Runner-Up and assumed the Miss USA title when the original winner was crowned Miss Universe and the 1st Runner-Up declined the title) |
| **Iowa** | 1 | **1956** |
| **Vermont** | 1 | 1955 |

The state later won the Miss Universe title indicated in bold
The state later inherited the Miss USA title after the original titleholder crowned Miss Universe indicated in italics

Debut wins

Not including states who were inherited the title.

Debut wins timeline
| | States/Federal District |
|---|---|
| 1950s | List: 1952: (New York (state)) New York; 1953: Illinois; 1954: South Carolina; 1955: Vermont; 1956: Iowa; 1957: Maryland; 1958: Louisiana; 1959: California |
| 1960s | List: 1960: Utah; 1962: Hawaii; 1964: (Washington, D.C.) District of Columbia; 1965: Ohio; 1967: Alabama; 1968: (Washington (state)) Washington; 1969: Virginia |
| 1970s | List: 1971: Pennsylvania; 1976: Minnesota; 1977: Texas |
| 1980s | List: 1982: Arkansas; 1984: New Mexico |
| 1990s | List: 1990: Michigan; 1991: Kansas; 1998: Massachusetts |
| 2000s | List: 2000: Tennessee; 2004: Missouri; 2005: North Carolina; 2006: Kentucky |
| 2010s | List: 2012: Rhode Island; 2013: Connecticut; 2014: Nevada; 2015: Oklahoma; 2018: Nebraska |
| 2020s | List: 2020: Mississippi |

=== States have yet to win Miss USA ===
There have been no Miss USA winners from the following states:

- Alaska
- Colorado
- Delaware
- (Georgia (U.S. state)) Georgia
- Indiana
- Maine
- Montana
- New Hampshire
- New Jersey
- North Dakota
- Oregon
- South Dakota
- West Virginia
- Wisconsin
- Wyoming
