= Miss Hawaii World =

Beauty pageant

- Formation: 1959
- Type: Beauty pageant
- Headquarters: Honolulu
- Location: Hawaii
- Members: Miss World (1959; 2001); Miss World America (1960–2000; 2002–present)
- Official language: English
- State Director: Leila Fernandez
- Website: Official website

Miss Hawaii World is an American state beauty pageant that selects a representative for the Miss World America national competition from the State of Hawaii. The pageant is headquartered in Honolulu, Honolulu County, and is currently directed by Leila Fernandez, who serves as State Director.

To date, one woman from Hawaii had been crowned Miss World America:

- Brooke Alexander, 1980

== Gallery of titleholders ==
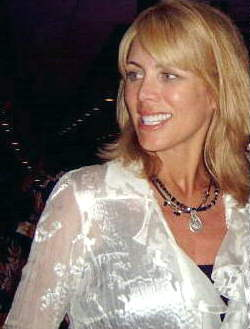
Teri Ann Linn, Miss Hawaii USA 1981 at her Punahou School reunion in June 2009

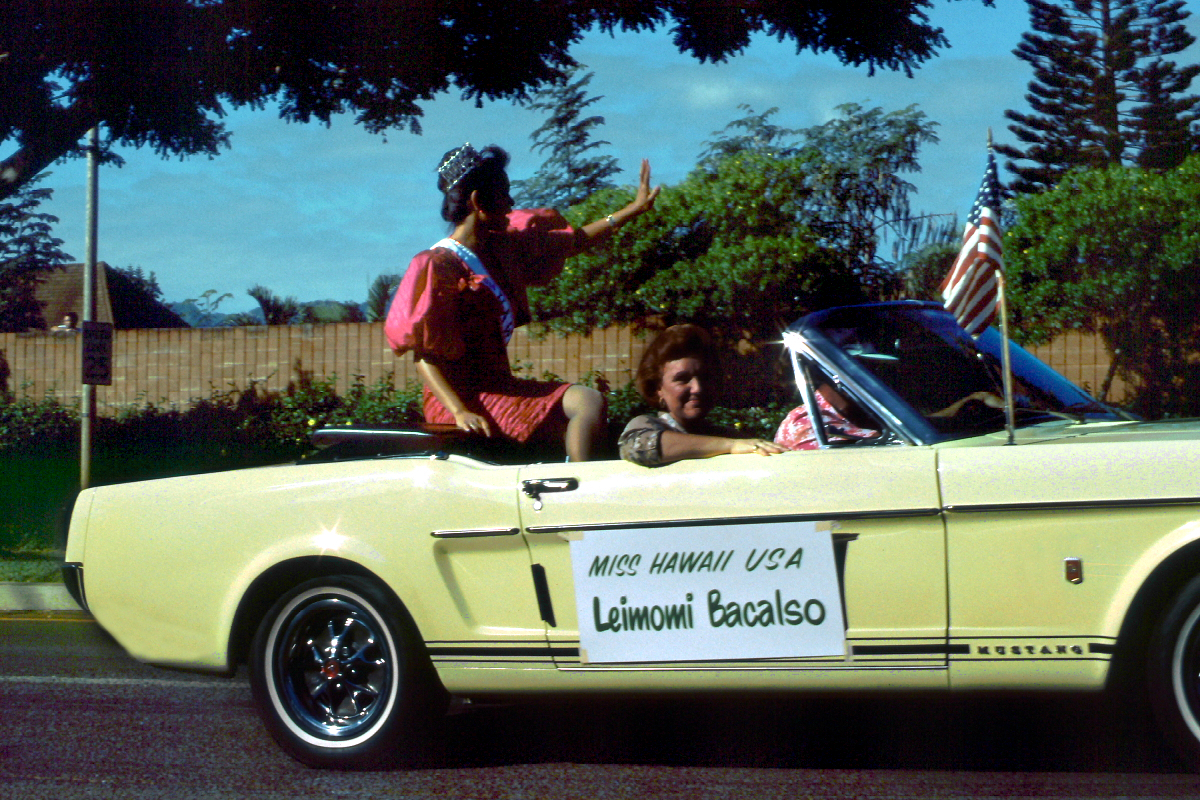
Leimomi Bacalso, Miss Hawaii USA 1990 in the 1989 Mililani Town Christmas Parade

== Winners ==
Color key

- Declared as Winner/Ended as Miss World America
- Ended as runner-up
- Ended as one of the finalists or semifinalists
- Ended as special awards winner
- Ended as Miss USA

Year	Name	Hometown	Age (Note: Age at the time of the Miss World America pageant)	Placement at Miss World America	Special awards at Miss World America	Notes
2020	Angela Hilario	Honolulu	26			
2019	Kayli Obrero	Koloa	25	4th Runner-Up	Top Model	
2018	No representatives from Hawaii from 2016 to 2018					
2017	No representatives from Hawaii from 2016 to 2018					
2016	No representatives from Hawaii from 2016 to 2018					
2015	Samantha Iha-Preece	Haleiwa	20	Top 22	Most Photogenic	
Miss Hawaii United States 2014
2014	Lauren Hickey			Top 16		
Miss Hawaii World
2013	No titleholders as Miss World America was designated from 2006 to 2013.					
2012	No titleholders as Miss World America was designated from 2006 to 2013.					
2011	No titleholders as Miss World America was designated from 2006 to 2013.					
2010	No titleholders as Miss World America was designated from 2006 to 2013.					
2009	No titleholders as Miss World America was designated from 2006 to 2013.					
2008	No titleholders as Miss World America was designated from 2006 to 2013.					
2007	No titleholders as Miss World America was designated from 2006 to 2013.					
2006	No titleholders as Miss World America was designated from 2006 to 2013.					
2005	No known representatives from Hawaii from 2003 to 2005.					
2004	No known representatives from Hawaii from 2003 to 2005.					
2003	No known representatives from Hawaii from 2003 to 2005.					
2002	No titleholder as Miss World America was designated in 2002.					
2001	Radasha Hoʻohuli	Nanakuli	21	competed at Miss World		Later Miss Hawaii USA 2006 and represented Hawaii at Miss USA 2006.
2000	No titleholders as Miss World America was designated from 1995 to 2000.					
1999	No titleholders as Miss World America was designated from 1995 to 2000.					
1998	No titleholders as Miss World America was designated from 1995 to 2000.					
1997	No titleholders as Miss World America was designated from 1995 to 2000.					
1996	No titleholders as Miss World America was designated from 1995 to 2000.					
1995	No titleholders as Miss World America was designated from 1995 to 2000.					
1994	Annette Michaud	Lihu’e				
1993	Paige Dunlap					
1992	Nadine Atangan Tanega	Honolulu	24	3rd Runner-Up		Previously Miss Hawaii International 1990 and 2nd Runner-Up at Miss International 1990. Later Miss Hawaii USA 1994 and Top 12 semifinalist at Miss USA 1994.
Miss Hawaii USA 1981-1991
1991	Kym Lehua Digmon	Honolulu	25	Top 11		
1990	Leimomi Bacalso	Ewa Beach	20			
1989	Julie Larson	Honolulu	21			Mrs. Hawaii America 1991
1988	Paula Prevost	Honolulu				
1987	Deborah Laslo	Haleiwa				
1986	Toni Costa	Kailua	20			
1985	Tina Machado	Waipahu	25	Top 10		
1984	Puna Stillman	Honolulu				
1983	Zoe Roach	Waipahu				
1982	Vanessa DuBois	Honolulu	23	Top 12		
1981	Teri Ann Linn	Honolulu	20	4th Runner-Up		Actress, starred in The Bold and the Beautiful.
Miss Hawaii World
1980	Brooke Alexander	Kailua	16	Miss World America 1980		6th Runner-Up at Miss World 1980
1979	Marie Alohalani Brown			Top 8		
1978	Sharon Bush					
1977	Unknown					
1976	Debbie Witthans					
1975	Tracy Lynn Monsarrat	Honolulu		2nd Runner-Up		
1974	Gloria McCafferty					
1973	Gail Rouleau					
1972	Sharlene Annette Ann Angeli Silva					
1971	did not compete					
1970	did not compete					
1969	Cyndi Jean Ozenne			Top 15		
1968	Leslie McRae			2nd Runner-Up		
1967	Ann Marie					
1966	Ann Marie					
1965	did not compete					
1964	did not compete					
1963	Susan Molina	Honolulu	18	Top 15		Previously Miss Hawaii USA 1963
1962	Julie Jones			Withdrew		Withdrew during finals due to back pains after the evening gown competition.
1961	did not compete					
1960	did not compete					
1959	Margaret Moani Keala Brumaghim			competed as a territory at Miss World		
1958	did not compete					
1957	did not compete					
1956	did not compete					
1955	Barbara Mamo Vieira	Honolulu		Was originally enrolled to compete at Miss World but did not compete at the pageant due to lack of sponsorship		Previously Miss Hawaii 1955, and Top 10 at Miss America 1956. Also won the Miss Congeniality and Preliminary Swimsuit awards at Miss America.

Notes to table
