= Miss Hawaii USA =

Beauty pageant competition

- Formation: 1952
- Type: Beauty pageant
- Headquarters: Honolulu
- Location: Hawaii
- Members: Miss Universe (1952 – 1959); Miss USA (1960 – Present)
- Official language: English
- Executive Director: Alicia Michioka
- Website: Official website

The Miss Hawaii USA competition, previously known as Miss Hawaii Universe, is a beauty pageant that selects the representative for the state of Hawaii in the Miss USA pageant.

Darja Bassut of Oahu was crowned Miss Hawaii USA 2026 on May 16, 2026, at Hawaii Convention Center in Honolulu. She will represent Hawaii at Miss USA 2026.

== History ==
Hawaii is the most recent state to participate in Miss USA, first competing in 1962. Prior to being admitted to full statehood in 1959, it sent delegates to Miss Universe. Despite the late start, it has been one of the most successful: Hawaii's first Miss Hawaii USA, Macel Wilson, won the Miss USA title. Four Miss USA winners came from Hawaii, one of four states with four titles (only second to Texas and California). Though many Miss USA winners and semifinalists came from Hawaii, relatively few have placed as runners-up. Two previously competed at Miss Teen USA. Kelly Hu, Miss Teen USA 1985, became the first Miss Teen USA winner to win a Miss title, in 1993.

Many Miss Hawaii USA titleholders competed at a number of international pageants. Similar to Miss South Carolina USA, there was one Miss Hawaii USA that competed at Miss World. Another one competed at Miss International. Four of the winners competed at Miss Universe, after winning Miss USA. Six titleholders represented the United States or Hawaii at major international pageants, with Miss Hawaii USA 1997, Brook Lee, winning the title of Miss USA 1997 and capturing the crown of Miss Universe 1997, one of only 9 Miss USA winners to become Miss Universe in the history of the pageant.

== Gallery of titleholders ==
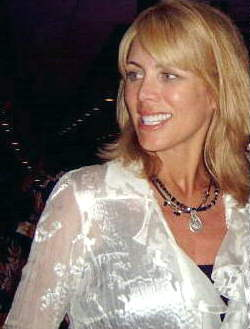
Teri Ann Linn, Miss Hawaii USA 1981 at her Punahou School reunion in June 2009

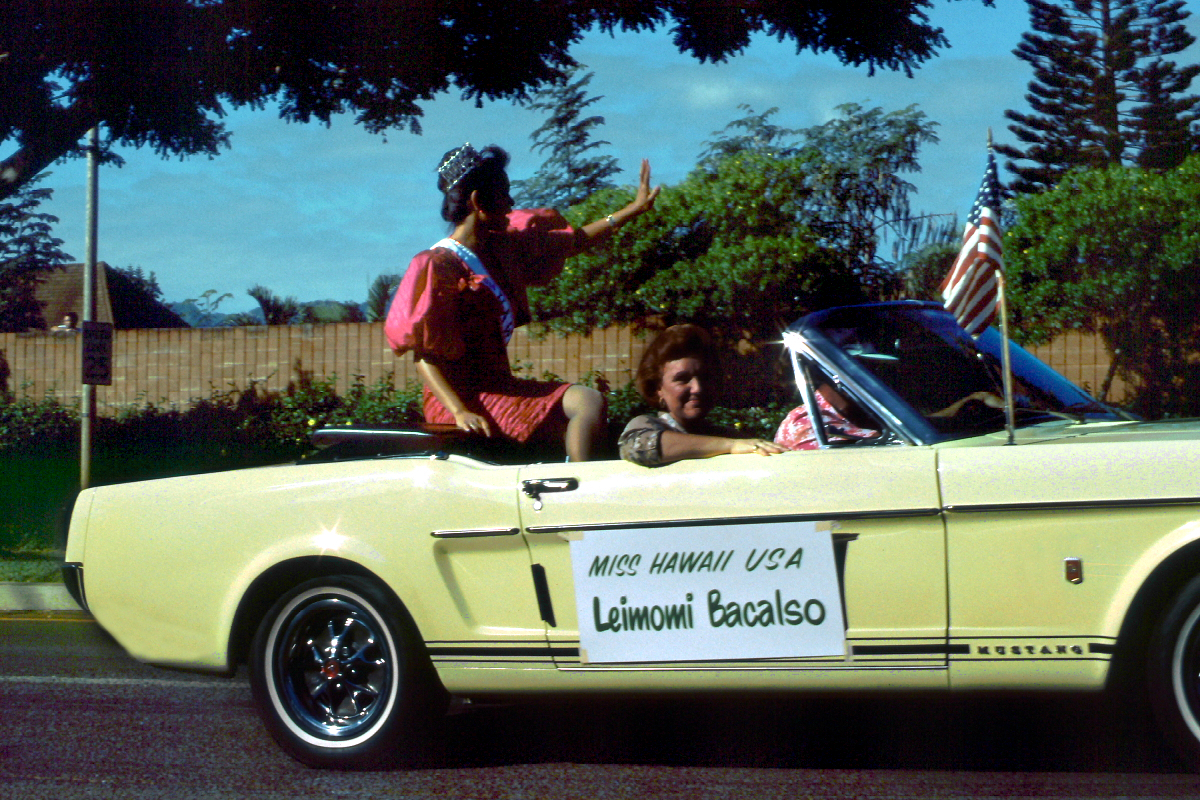
Leimomi Bacalso, Miss Hawaii USA 1990 in the 1989 Mililani Town Christmas Parade

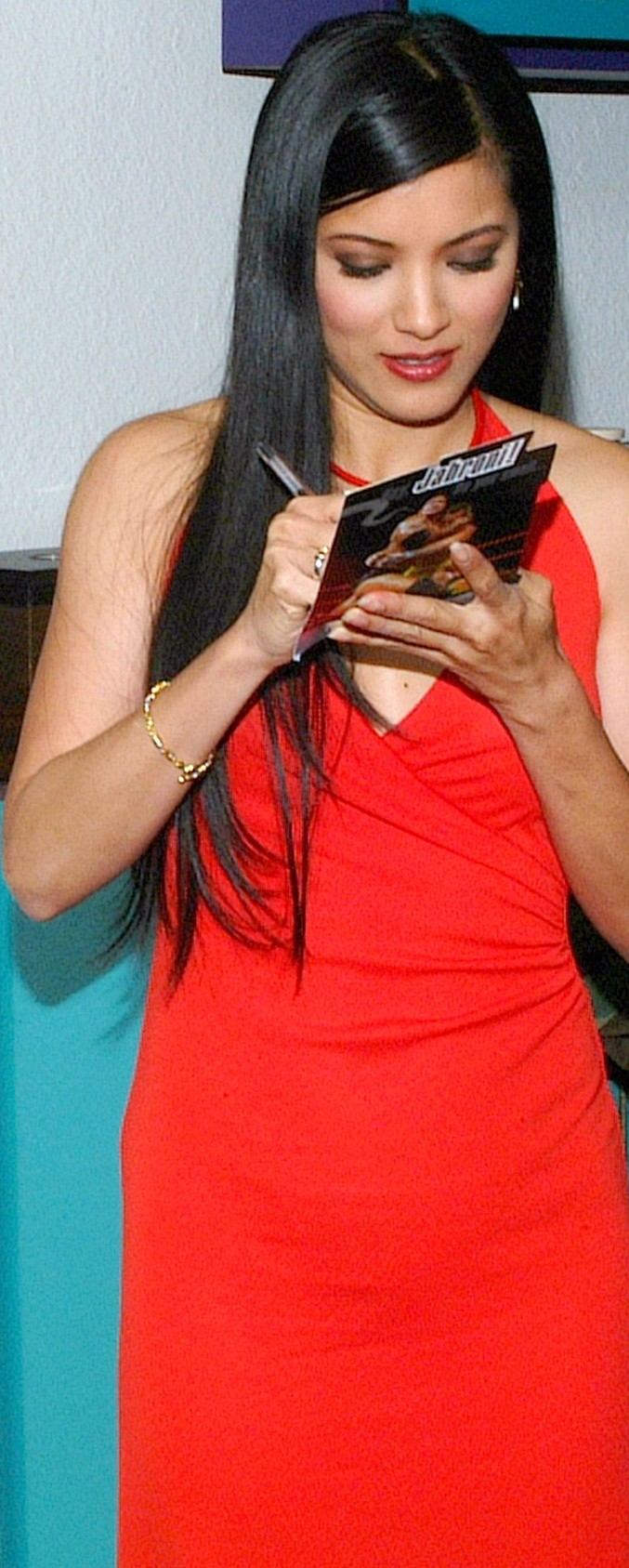
Kelly Hu, Miss Hawaii USA 1993 and Miss Teen USA 1985, at a public event

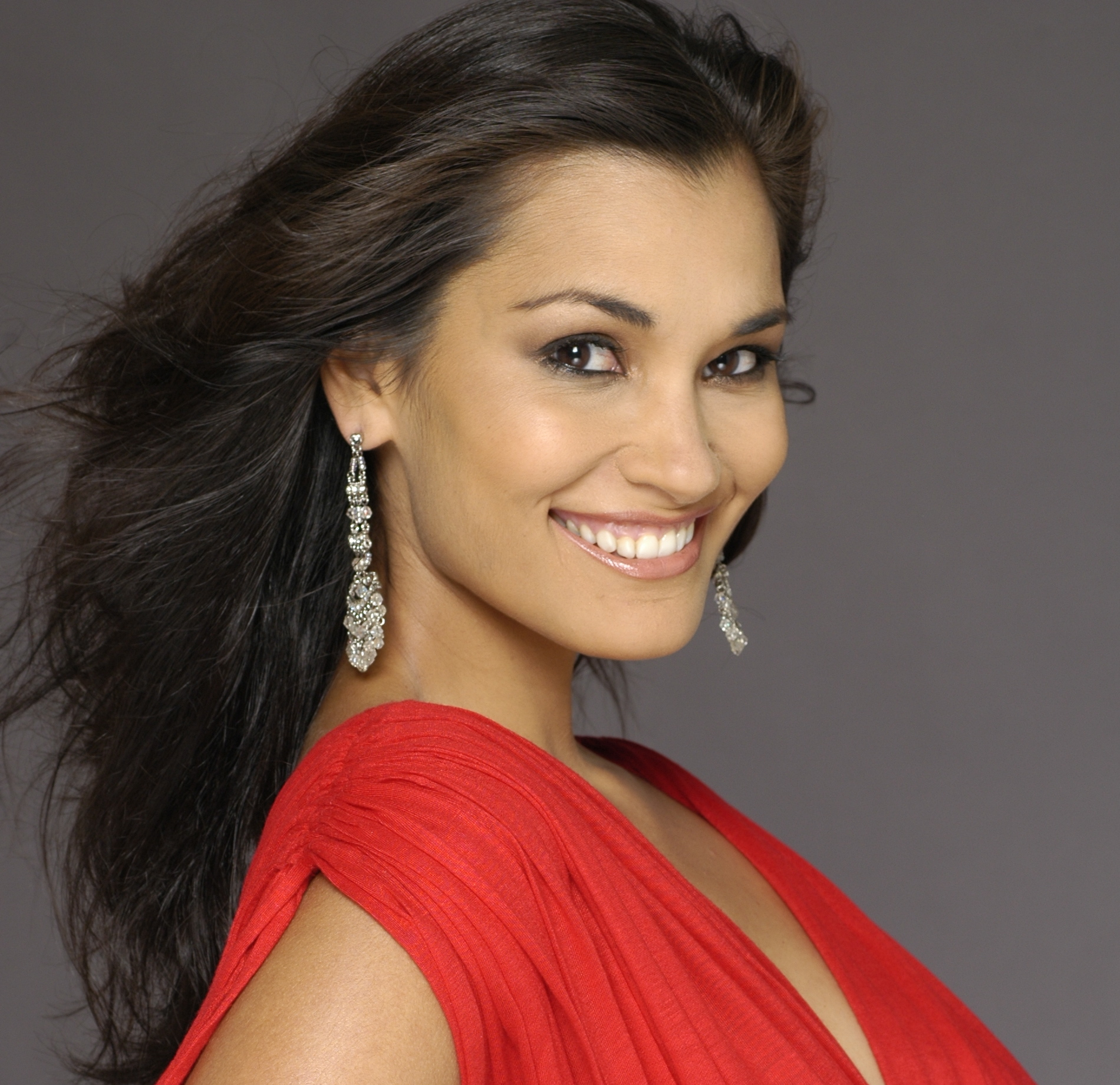
Brook Lee, Miss Hawaii USA 1997, Miss USA 1997 and Miss Universe 1997

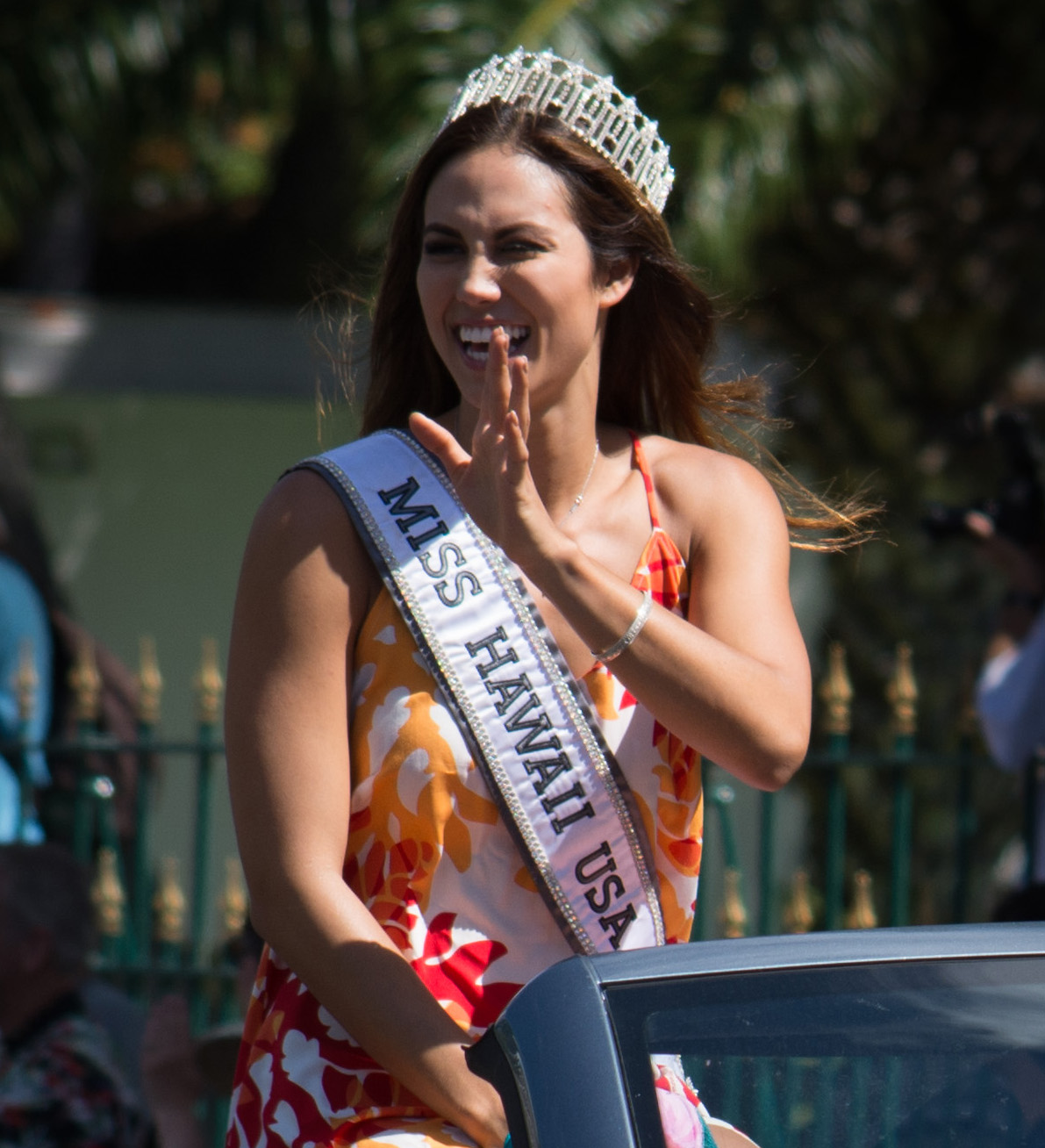
Chelsea Hardin, Miss Hawaii USA 2016

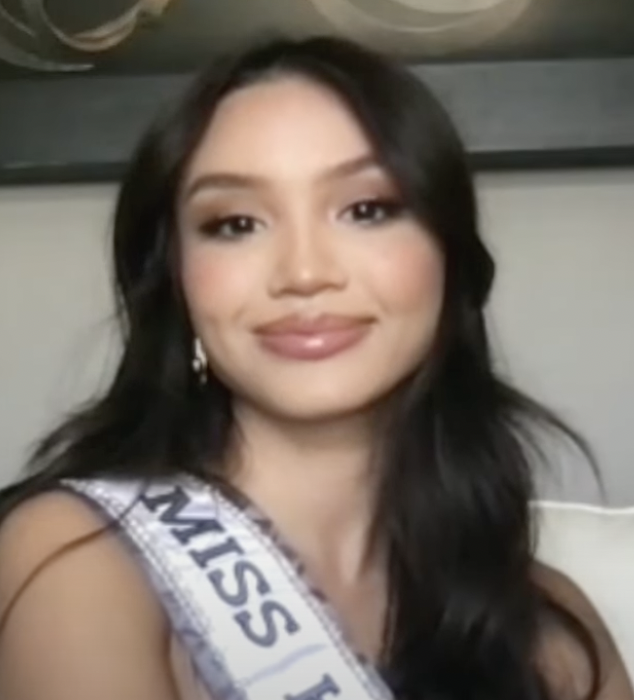
Savannah Gankiewicz, Miss Hawaii USA 2023 and Miss USA 2023

== Results summary ==
=== Placements ===
- Miss USAs: Macel Wilson (1962), Tanya Wilson (1972), Judi Andersen (1978), Brook Lee (1997)
- 1st runner-up: Chelsea Hardin (2016), Savannah Gankiewicz (2023) (Note: Savannah Gankiewicz was originally 1st runner-up at Miss USA 2023 but assumed title after the winner relinquished her title for personal reasons.)
- 2nd runner-up: Blanche Leialoha Maʻa (1979)
- 4th runner-up: Teri Ann Linn (1981)
- Top 6: Kelly Hu (1993)
- Top 8/10/11/12: Lois Wise (1975), Cely De Castro (1977), Vanessa Dubois (1982), Tina Machado (1985), Kym Digman (1991), Nadine Tanega (1994), Alicia Michioka (2003), Chanel Wise (2007), Angela Byrd (2011), Emma Wo (2015), Samantha Neyland (2020), Breea Yamat (2024)
- Top 15: Elithe Aguiar (1965), Judith Wolski (1966), Carol Seymour (1968), Stephanie Quintana (1969), Lacie Choy (2019)

Hawaii holds a record of 26 placements at Miss USA.

=== Awards ===
- Miss Congeniality: Ku'ualoha Taylor (1996), Michelle Kaplan (2000)
- Miss Photogenic: Kelly Hu (1993)
- Style Award: Lynn Vesnefski (1995)
- Best State Costume: Savannah Gankiewicz (2023)

== Winners ==
Color key

- Declared as Winner
- Ended as runner-up or finalist
- Ended as one of the semifinalists

Year	Name	Hometown	Age (Note: Age at the time of crowning)	Local title	Placement at Miss USA	Special awards at Miss USA	Notes
2026	Darja Bassut	Oahu	23	Miss Oahu			
2025	Issha Rose Mata	Hilo	30	Miss Hilo			
2024	Breea Yamat	Oahu	27	Miss Oahu	Top 10		Sister of Kiana Yamat, Miss Hawaii USA 2022
2023	Savannah Mari Gankiewicz	Kihei	27	Miss Wailea	1st Runner-up	Best State Costume	Became Miss USA 2023 following the resignation of Noelia Voigt; Previously Mutya ng Pilipinas Overseas Filipino Communities 2017
2022	Kiana Yamat	Honolulu	27	Miss Waikiki			Sister of Breea Yamat, Miss Hawaii USA 2024
2021	Allison Carol Nanea Chu	Honolulu	26	Miss Wailupe			Previously Miss Hawaii 2016; Sister of Miss Hawaii Teen USA 2010 and Miss Hawaii USA 2018 Julianne Chu
2020	Samantha Neyland	Honolulu	24	Miss Hawaii Kai	Top 10		Previously Miss Hawaii Teen USA 2013 and top 16 at Miss Teen USA 2013.; First African American Miss Hawaii USA
2019	Lacie Choy	Honolulu	20	Miss Waikiki	Top 15		
2018	Julianne Chu	Honolulu	26	Miss Honolulu			Previously Miss Hawaii Teen USA 2010.; Sister to Miss Hawaii 2016 Allison Chu
2017	Julie Kuo	Honolulu	23	Miss Honolulu			Born in Taiwan
2016	Chelsea Keolani Hardin	Honolulu	24	Miss East Oahu	1st Runner-up		Being crowned Miss Hawaii USA was her first pageant experience.
2015	Emily Colleen "Emma" Wo	Honolulu	25	Miss Manoa	Top 11		Previously Miss Hawaii Teen USA 2008
2014	Moani Anna Marguerite Hara	Manoa	24	Miss Nuuanu			Previously Miss Hawaii's Outstanding Teen 2007
2013	Brianna Acosta	Waialua	21				Competed at Miss International 2015, representing Hawaii
2012	Brandie Kapuaalohaakaua Cazimero	Hawaii Kai	26				
2011	Angela Anela Jokia Byrd	Honolulu	18		Top 8		Competed and won Miss LVIMS 2015. Competed and won Miss International Model 2016.
2010	Renee Mokihana Nobriga	Pupukea	25				
2009	Aureana Kamaliʻiʻoʻiwalani Kim Len Tseu	Mililani	25				Previously Miss Hawaii Teen USA 1999
2008	Jonelle Layfield	Kaneohe	22				Sister of Ashley Layfield, Miss Hawaii 2007
2007	Chanel Joy Puaalaonalani Wise	Honolulu	21		Top 10		
2006	Radasha Leialoha Hoʻohuli	Nanakuli	26				Miss Hawaii World 2001 and Represented Hawaii at Miss World 2001
2005	Jennifer Fairbank	Honolulu	25				
2004	Justine Michioka	Kapaa	22				Sister of Miss Hawaii USA 2003, Alicia Michioka
2003	Alicia Malia Michioka	Kapaa	24		Top 10		Sister of Miss Hawaii USA 2004, Justine Michioka. Later Mrs. Hawaii America 2010.; Current director of Hawaii (both Miss & Teen) pageant
2002	Juliet Lighter	Honolulu	26				
2001	Christy Lynn Leonard	Lahaina	22				
2000	Michele Jacqueline Kaplan	Kona	23			Miss Congeniality	
1999	Trini-Ann Leilani Kaopuiki	Honolulu	25				Previously Miss Hawaii Teen USA 1991
1998	Tiffini Kawaonaheleopaiʻi Hercules	Kailua					
1997	Leslie-Ann Kwailan Lum	Honolulu	26		did not compete		Originally first runner-up, assumed the title when Brook Lee crowned Miss USA 1997; Previously Miss Hawaii Teen USA 1987
1997	Brook Antoinette Mahealani Lee	Pearl City	26		Miss USA 1997		Miss Universe 1997
1996	Kuʻualoha Taylor	Hilo	25			Miss Congeniality	
1995	Lyn K. Vesnefski	Honolulu	19			Style Award	
1994	Nadine Atangan Tanega	Honolulu	26		Top 12		Miss Hawaii International 1990 and 2nd Runner-Up at Miss International 1990.; Miss Hawaii World 1992 and 3rd Runner-Up at Miss World America 1992.
1993	Kelly Ann Hu	Honolulu	24		Top 6	Miss Photogenic	Actress, previously Miss Hawaii Teen USA 1985 and Miss Teen USA 1985
1992	Heather Elizabeth Hays	Honolulu	20				Currently a newscaster at KDFW in Dallas
1991	Kym Lehua Digmon	Honolulu	25		Top 11		
1990	Leimomi Bacalso	ʻEwa Beach	20				
1989	Julie Larson	Honolulu	21				Mrs. Hawaii America 1991
1988	Paula Prevost	Honolulu	20				
1987	Deborah "Debbie" Laslo	Haleiwa	24				
1986	Toni Leimomi Costa	Kailua	20				Briefly Miss Hawaii USA 1985 due to Tina Machado's disqualification
1985	Toni Leimomi Costa	Kailua			Did not compete		First runner-up at Miss Hawaii USA 1985, but due to represent Hawaii at Miss USA, due to Tina Machado's disqualification
1985	Tina Marie Machado	Honolulu	25		Top 10		Initially disqualified due to being overage, later regained title after a $5 million lawsuit
1984	Puna Stillman	Honolulu	23				
1983	Zoe Ann Roach	Honolulu	24				
1982	Vanessa DuBois	Honolulu	23		Top 12		
1981	Teri Ann Linn	Honolulu	20		4th Runner-up		Actress, starred in The Bold and the Beautiful.
1980	Carol Lee Ching	Kāneʻohe	21				
1979	Blanche Leialoha Maa	Kāneʻohe	20		2nd Runner-up		
1978	Judi Lois Andersen	Honolulu	20		Miss USA 1978		1st runner-up at Miss Universe 1978
1977	Celita "Cely" Ochoa DeCastro	Honolulu	23		Top 12		
1976	Brenda Texeira	Hilo					
1975	Lois Mililani Wise	Honolulu	21		Top 12		
1974	Joan Marie Ottensmeyer	Kaneohe					Originally first runner-up, assumed the title when Agnes Lum was disqualified
1974	Agnes Nalani Lum		17		Did not compete		Disqualified for being under the age requirements.
1973	Camille Deubel	Kaneohe					
1972	Tanya Denise Wilson	Honolulu	21		Miss USA 1972		Top 12 semifinalist at Miss Universe 1972
1971	Deborah L. Gibson	Honolulu	18				
1970	Donna Hartley	Honolulu	22				Participated in Miss Hawaii USA 1968
1969	Stephanie Quintana	Honolulu	23		Top 15		
1968	Carol Ann Seymour	Waiʻanae	24		Top 15	Top 15 Best in Swimsuit	Born in Massachusetts
1967	Nancy Victoria Banks	Honolulu					
1966	Judith Anne Wolski	Honolulu	18		Top 15		
1965	Elithe W. Aguiar	Kapaa	20		Top 15		
1964	Wanda Byrd		18				
1963	Susan Molina	Honolulu	18				Later Miss Hawaii World 1963 and Top 15 semifinalist in Miss USA World 1963
1962	Macel Patricia Leilani Wilson	Honolulu	19		Miss USA 1962		Top 15 semifinalist at Miss Universe 1962
1961	Did not compete						
1960	Gordean Leilehua Lee				Did not compete		
1959	Patricia F. "Pat" Visser	Honolulu	21		competed as a territory at Miss Universe 1959		
1958	Geri Hoo	Honolulu	18		competed as a territory at Miss Universe 1958		2nd Runner-up at Miss Universe 1958
1957	Ramona Tong	Honolulu	19		competed as a territory at Miss Universe 1957		
Did not compete between 1955—1956
1954	Gertrude Kapiolani Miller	Honolulu	21				No show at Miss Universe 1954. Later Miss Hawaii 1954 and won a Non-Finalist Talent Award at Miss America 1955.
1953	Aileen Lauwae Stone	Honolulu	20		competed as a territory at Miss Universe 1953		
1952	Elsa Etta Kananionapua Edsman	Honolulu	19		competed as a territory at Miss Universe 1952		1st Runner-up at Miss Universe 1952
