= Miss USA 1962 =

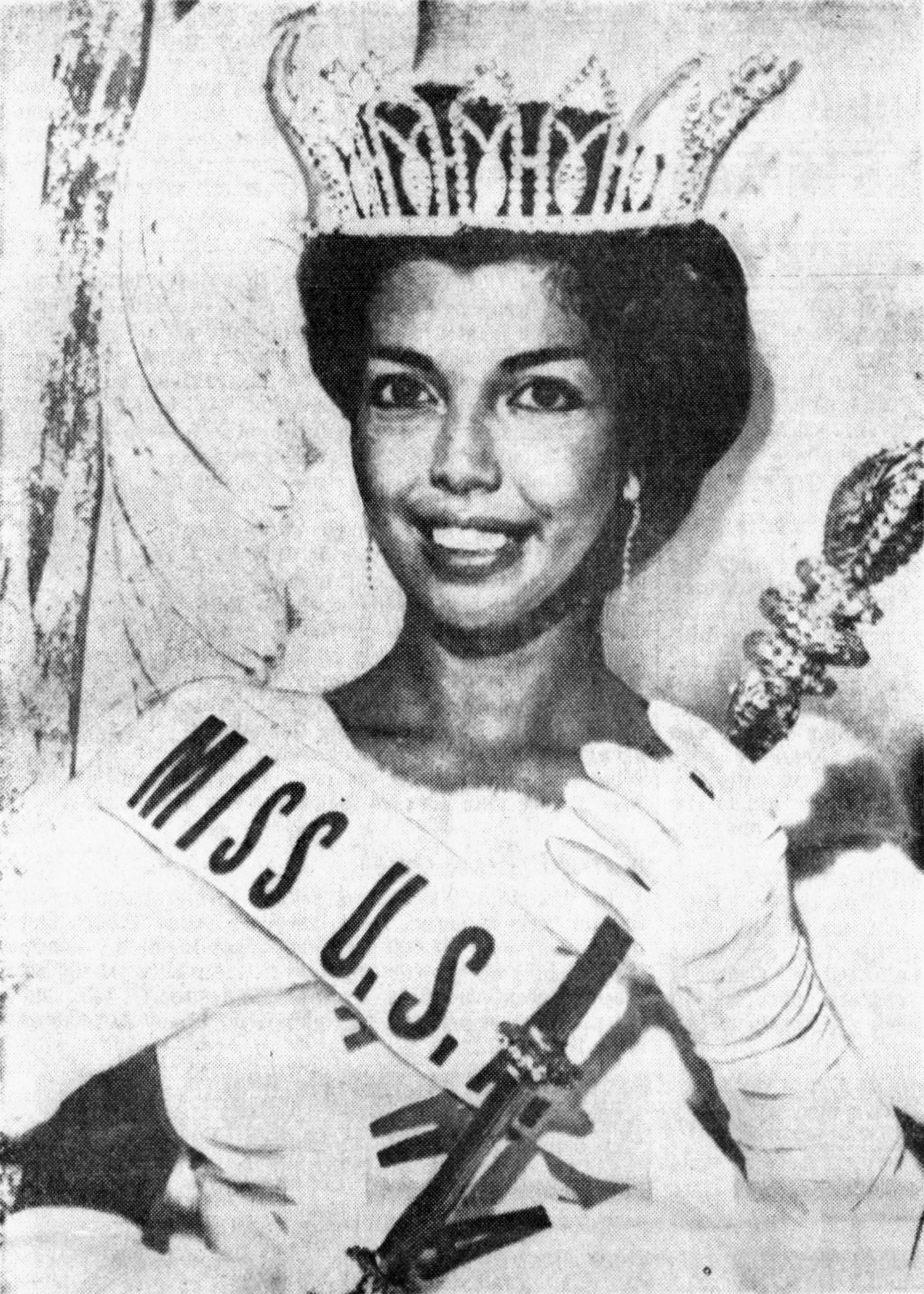
- Macel Wilson, Miss USA 1962
- Date: July 12, 1962
- Venue: Miami Beach, Florida
- Entrants: 40
- Placements: 16
- Withdrawals: Delaware; Nebraska; New Mexico; South Dakota; Virginia; Washington; Wyoming
- Winner: Macel Wilson; Hawaii

Miss USA 1962 was the 11th Miss USA pageant, held at the Miami Beach Auditorium, Miami Beach, Florida on July 12, 1962.

At the end of the event Sharon Brown of Louisiana crowned Macel Leilani Wilson of Hawaii as Miss USA 1962. It is the first victory of Hawaii in the pageant's history. Wilson is also the first Asian-American to win the title of Miss USA. Wilson later competed at Miss Universe and was named one of the fifteen semi-finalists.

Contestants from thirty-nine states and the District of Columbia competed in the pageant.

== Results ==
=== Placements ===
Placement	Contestant
Miss USA 1962	Hawaii – Macel Wilson
1st runner-up	Connecticut – Diane Zabicki
2nd runner-up	Tennessee – Gail White
3rd runner-up	California – Marilyn Tindall
4th runner-up	Nevada - Janet Hadland
Top 16	Arizona – Jerri Michelson; Colorado – Penny James; District of Columbia – Helen Sweeney; Illinois – Jean Donnelly; Indiana – Sue Ekamp; New Hampshire – Sandra Kay; New York – Sherrylyn Patecell; Oregon – Joyce Collin; Pennsylvania – Margaret Lineman; Texas – Jackie Williams; Utah – Patricia Profaizer

== Contestants ==
Forty contestants competed for the title.

State/District	Contestant	Age (Note: Ages at the time of the pageant)	Hometown	Notes
Alabama	Jerolyn Ridgeway	20	Fort Payne	
Alaska	Teresa Hanson	18	Fairbanks	
Arizona	Jerri Michelson	18	Paradise Valley	
Arkansas	Linda Riggan	20	Leola	2nd runner up at Miss American Beauty 1964
California	Marilyn Tindall	21	Los Angeles	
Colorado	Penny James	19	Aurora	
Connecticut	Diane Zabicki	19	Middletown	
District of Columbia	Helen Sweeney	20	Washington, D.C.	
Florida	Sharon Conrad	19	Tampa	
Georgia	Genelda Odum	18	Jesup	Competed in the 1963 Miss Dixie Pageant
Hawaii	Macel Patricia Leilani Wilson	19	Honolulu	Top 15 semifinalist at Miss Universe 1962
Idaho	Kinne Marie Holland	18	Nampa	
Illinois	Jean Donnelly	20	DeKalb	
Indiana	Sue Ekamp	19	Mishawaka	
Iowa	Regina Prusha	19	Cedar Rapids	
Kansas	Linda Light	18	Topeka	
Kentucky	Sally Margaret Carter	19	Lowes	
Louisiana	Diane DeClouet	19	Oak Ridge	Semi-finalist in Miss World USA 1962
Maine	Karen J. Henderson	20	South Portland	
Maryland	Shelda Farley	20	Catonsville	
Massachusetts	Gail Pope	18	Wellesley	
Michigan	Judith Lamparter	18	Detroit	
Mississippi	Sandra Mazur	–	Jackson	Competed in the 1963 Miss Dixie Pageant
Missouri	Mikee Campbell	21	Springfield	
Nevada	Janet Hadland	19	Las Vegas	
New Hampshire	Sandra Kay	18	Plaistow	
New Jersey	Joyce Claire Thompson	–	Bellmawr	
New York	Sherrylyn Patecell	21	Flushing	
North Carolina	Brenda Joyce Smith	–	Charlotte	
Ohio	Joan Colucy	22	Massillon	
Oregon	Joyce Collin	20	Lebanon	
Pennsylvania	Margaret Lineman	18	Philadelphia	
Rhode Island	Marilyn Scott	24	Pawtucket	
South Carolina	Judy Clyburn	20	Camden	
Tennessee	Gail White	21	Chattanooga	
Texas	Jackie Faye Williams	19	Waxahachie	
Utah	Patricia Profaizer	26	Salt Lake City	
Vermont	Barbara Ann Kearney	18	Springfield	
West Virginia	Nickie Sue Gagalis	19	Beckley	
Wisconsin	Sherri Mathson	20	Milwaukee	
