= Miss USA 2023 =

72nd edition of the Miss USA competition

- Date: September 29, 2023
- Presenters: Keltie Knight; Adrienne Bailon-Houghton; Jordan Kimball; Morgan Romano
- Venue: Grand Sierra Resort, Reno, Nevada
- Broadcaster: The CW
- Entrants: 51
- Placements: 20
- Winner: Noelia Voigt Utah (Resigned); Savannah Gankiewicz Hawaii (Assumed)
- Congeniality: Jordan Naylor, Alaska
- Best State Costume: Savannah Gankiewicz, Hawaii
- Photogenic: Annika Sharma, Massachusetts

Miss USA 2023 was the 72nd Miss USA pageant, held at the Grand Sierra Resort in Reno, Nevada, on September 29, 2023. All times in this article are Pacific Time Zone (UTC-7)

Morgan Romano of North Carolina crowned Noelia Voigt of Utah as her successor at the end of the event. This is Utah's third Miss USA title and first win in sixty-three years. Voigt resigned from the title on May 6, 2024, due to mental health. Savannah Gankiewicz of Hawaii was later announced as her successor on May 9, 2024.

The competition was hosted by Keltie Knight and Adrienne Bailon-Houghton, with Jordan Kimball and Miss USA 2022 Morgan Romano as correspondents. This was the first pageant to be held under the directorship of fashion designer Laylah Rose, and aired on The CW. It was also the last edition with an upper age limit of twenty-eight years.

== Background ==
=== Location ===
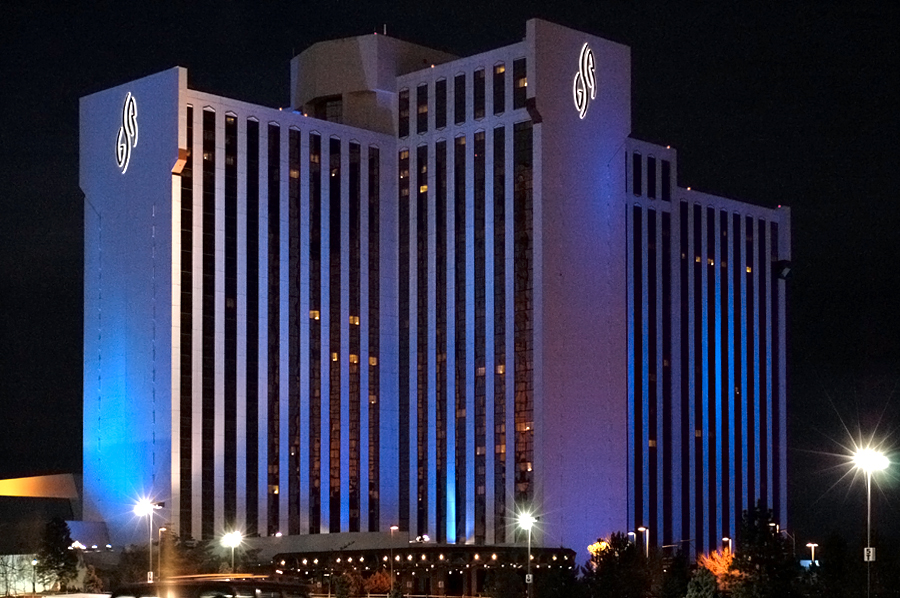
The competition venue

On July 14, 2022, it was reported that the competition would be held in Reno, Nevada, with the city securing a three-year deal to host the pageant from 2022 to 2024. It was the third time that the pageant was held in Reno, and the second consecutive year in the city, following Miss USA 2019 and 2022. Then-Miss USA organization president Crystle Stewart said the location was chosen to honor Cheslie Kryst, who won Miss USA 2019 in the same venue and had died by suicide in January 2022.

On October 7, due to allegations of rigging at Miss USA 2022, the franchise for the pageant and its sister pageant Miss Teen USA were suspended and returned to the Miss Universe Organization. In August 2023, it was announced that Crystle Stewart had stepped down as president of the Miss USA Organization. She was replaced by fashion designer Laylah Rose.

=== Selection of contestants ===
Starting with this competition, the Miss Universe organization announced that married women and mothers could compete. The ruling was first used in the first five editions of the pageant before being revised in 1957.

In September 2023, Miss USA 2022 winner R'Bonney Gabriel announced that from 2024, there would be no maximum age limit, especially for related national pageants. Previously, contestants had to be between the ages of 18 and 28 by the start of pageants.

Delegates from the fifty states and the District of Columbia are selected in state pageants which began in September 2022 and scheduled to conclude in August 2023, as the state pageant schedule can become very dense between the last state pageant held from 2022. The first state pageant was Miss Idaho USA, held on September 11, 2022, and the last state pageant was Miss New York USA, held on August 6, 2023. Miss Maine USA became the first married Miss USA state titleholder in sixty-six years after getting married in April 2023. Nine state titleholders were former Miss Teen USA state winners, two were former Miss World America state winners, another was a former Miss America's Outstanding Teen state titleholder, three are former Miss America state titleholders, and one is former Miss Supranational Zambian winner.

== Results ==
=== Placements ===
| Placement | Contestant |
|---|---|
| Miss USA 2023 | Utah – Noelia Voigt |
| 1st runner-up | Hawaii – Savannah Gankiewicz ∞ |
| 2nd runner-up | Wisconsin – Alexis Loomans |
| 3rd runner-up | Pennsylvania – Jasmine Daniels |
| 4th runner-up | Texas – Lluvia Alzate |
| Top 20 | Alabama – Sophie Burzynski; Arkansas – Mackenzie Hinderberger; California – Tianna Clark; Connecticut – Karla Aponte Roque; District of Columbia – Cassie Baloue; Florida – Caroline Dixon; Illinois – Samantha Elliott; Maryland – Savena Mushinge; Nevada – Josie Stephens; New Mexico – Bianca Wright §; North Carolina – Jordyn McKey; South Carolina – Kirby Elizabeth Self; Virginia – Ashley Williams; Washington – Samantha Gallia |

∞ – Voigt resigned as Miss USA 2023. Due to protocol, the first runner-up, Savannah Gankiewicz, assumed the Miss USA title.
§ – Voted into Top 20 by viewers

=== Special awards ===
| Award | Contestant |
|---|---|
| Best State Costume | Hawaii – Savannah Gankiewicz |
| Miss Congeniality | Alaska – Jordan Naylor |
| Miss Photogenic | Massachusetts – Annika Sharma |
| Best in Interview | Hawaii – Savannah Gankiewicz |
| Best in Evening Gown | Pennsylvania – Jasmine Daniels |
| Best in Swimwear | Texas – Lluvia Alzate |
| Impact Award | Mississippi - Sydney Russell |

== Pageant ==
=== Format ===
The Miss USA Organization introduced several specific changes to the format for this edition. The number of semi-finalists was increased to twenty from sixteen of the previous year. The results of the preliminary competition — which consisted of the swimsuit competition, the evening gown competition, and the closed-door interview determined the first nineteen semi-finalists who advanced at the first cut. The internet voting was also used, with fans being able to vote for another delegate to advance into the semifinals. The twenty semi-finalists competed in both the swimsuit and evening gown competitions and were to be narrowed down to five afterwards. The five finalists competed in the question and answer round, and the final speech portion, after which Miss USA 2023 and her runners-up were announced.

=== Selection committee ===
- Nicole Miller – Fashion designer
- Vivica A. Fox – Actress
- Emina Cunmulaj Nazarian – Model
- Patrick Starrr – Beauty entrepreneur
- Luann de Lesseps – Television personality

== Contestants ==
Fifty-one contestants competed for the title.

| State/district | Contestant | Age (Note: Ages at the time of the pageant) | Hometown | Notes |
|---|---|---|---|---|
| Alabama | Sophie Burzynski | 22 | Auburn | |
| Alaska | Jordan Naylor | 25 | Anchorage | Previously Miss Alaska's Outstanding Teen 2012; Later Miss Alaska 2024 |
| Arizona | Candace Kanavel | 27 | Tempe | |
| Arkansas | Mackenzie Hinderberger | 24 | Farmington | Previously Miss Arkansas Teen USA 2018 |
| California | Tianna Clark | 27 | Perris | |
| Colorado | Arianna Lemus | 27 | Gunnison | |
| Connecticut | Karla Aponte Roque | 27 | Branford | Previously Miss Connecticut World 2019 |
| Delaware | Noa Mills | 25 | Middletown | |
| District of Columbia | Cassie Baloue | 25 | Washington, D.C. | |
| Florida | Caroline Dixon | 25 | Palm Harbor | |
| Georgia | Rachel Russaw | 24 | Atlanta | |
| Hawaii | Savannah Gankiewicz | 27 | Kihei | Previously Mutya ng Pilipinas Overseas Filipino Communities 2017 |
| Idaho | Hannah Menzner | 27 | Boise | Previously Miss Idaho Teen USA 2014 |
| Illinois | Samantha Elliott | 22 | Freeport | Later Miss Cosmo USA 2024, Top 5 at Miss Cosmo 2024 |
| Indiana | Haley Jordan | 25 | Pittsboro | Previously Miss Indiana 2017 |
| Iowa | Grace Lynn Keller | 24 | Coralville | Previously Miss Iowa 2021 |
| Kansas | Haley Berger | 22 | Lawrence | Daughter of Prathumrat Woramali Berger, Miss Thailand World 1989 |
| Kentucky | Madalyne Kinnett | 22 | Lexington | |
| Louisiana | Sylvia Masters | 28 | Houma | |
| Maine | Juliana Morehouse Locklear | 23 | Portland | First married Miss USA state titleholder Daughter of Lynn Jenkins Morehouse, Miss North Carolina USA 1994 |
| Maryland | Savena Mushinge | 26 | Germantown | Previously Miss Supranational Zambia 2022 |
| Massachusetts | Annika Sharma | 22 | Newton | Previously Miss Massachusetts Teen USA 2020 |
| Michigan | Alexis Fagan-Williams | 22 | Detroit | |
| Minnesota | Sarah Anderson | 20 | Maple Grove | |
| Mississippi | Sydney Russell | 24 | Collinsville | |
| Missouri | Autumn Black | 24 | Kansas City | |
| Montana | Madyson Rigg | 26 | Kalispell | Previously Miss Montana Teen USA 2014 |
| Nebraska | Mimi Wood | 24 | Omaha | |
| Nevada | Josie Stephens | 28 | Fallon | |
| New Hampshire | Britney Lane | 26 | Hooksett | |
| New Jersey | Derby Chukwudi | 25 | Hoboken | |
| New Mexico | Bianca Wright | 28 | Anthony | |
| New York | Rachelle Di Stasio | 26 | New York City | |
| North Carolina | Jordyn McKey | 25 | Charlotte | |
| North Dakota | Monni Nyaribo | 27 | Grand Forks | |
| Ohio | Mackenzie Schutt | 27 | Westerville | |
| Oklahoma | Liv Walbeck | 21 | Norman | |
| Oregon | Manju Bangalore | 25 | Corvallis | Previously Miss Oregon World 2018 and 2020, and Miss California World 2019 |
| Pennsylvania | Jasmine Daniels | 26 | Collegeville | Previously Miss Pennsylvania Teen USA 2015 |
| Rhode Island | Mary Malloy | 26 | Cumberland | Previously Miss Rhode Island Teen USA 2015 |
| South Carolina | Kirby Elizabeth Self | 23 | Greenwood | Previously Miss South Carolina Teen USA 2018 |
| South Dakota | Amber Hulse | 25 | Hot Springs | Previously Miss South Dakota 2019 and Miss South Dakota 2020. |
| Tennessee | Regan Ringler | 26 | Nashville | |
| Texas | Lluvia Alzate | 26 | Houston | |
| Utah | Noelia Voigt | 23 | Park City | |
| Vermont | Jenna Howlett | 21 | Bridport | Previously Miss Vermont Teen USA 2019 |
| Virginia | Ashley Williams | 24 | Reston | Former professional cheerleader for the Miami Dolphins Cheerleaders |
| Washington | Samantha Gallia | 25 | Seattle | |
| West Virginia | Nevaeh Harmon | 21 | Charleston | |
| Wisconsin | Alexis Loomans | 21 | Waunakee | Previously Miss Wisconsin Teen USA 2018 |
| Wyoming | Beck Bridger | 27 | Sheridan | Previously Miss Wyoming 2018 |
