= Macel Wilson =

1962 Miss USA, film editor, painter

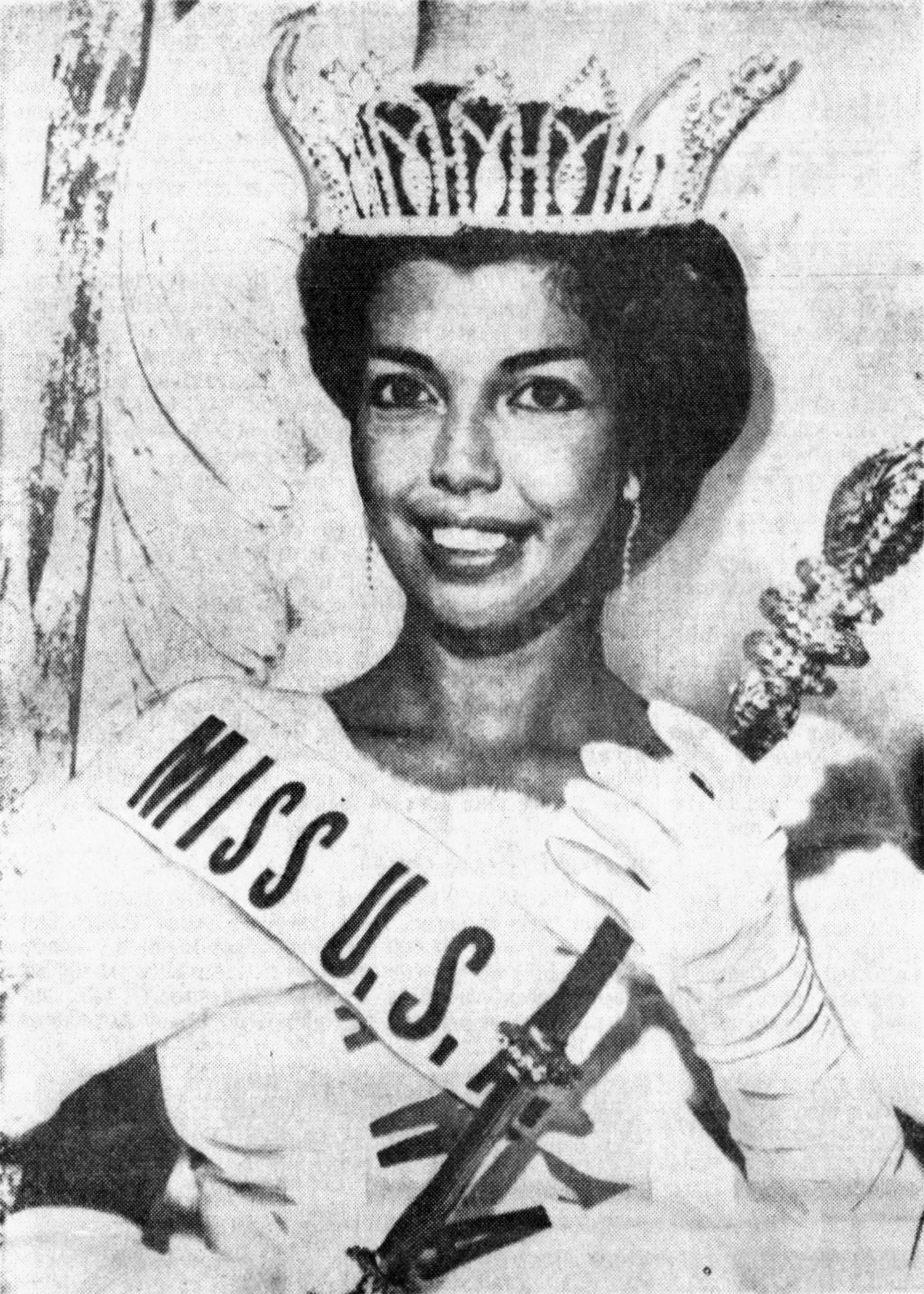
- Wilson as Miss USA 1962
- Born: Macel Patricia Leilani Wilson; May 5, 1943 (age 83); Honolulu, Territory of Hawaii, U.S.
- Education: Miami Dade College; University of Copenhagen
- Occupations: Film editor; visual artist
- Spouse: Jens Henrik Packness (m. 1967)
- Beauty pageant titleholder
- Title: Miss Hawaii USA 1962; Miss USA 1962
- Hair color: Brown
- Eye color: Brown
- Major competitions: Miss USA 1962 (Winner); Miss Universe 1962 (Top 15)

Macel Patricia Leilani Wilson (born May 5, 1943) is an American beauty pageant titleholder who was crowned Miss USA 1962. Previously crowned Miss Hawaii USA 1962, Wilson was the first entrant from Hawaii, first Asian American, and first woman of color to win Miss USA. Later in life, Wilson relocated to Denmark and became a film editor for the Danish Broadcasting Corporation (DR) and a visual artist.

== Pageantry ==
Wilson began competing in pageantry after she was crowned Miss Hawaii USA 1962. As Miss Hawaii USA, Wilson competed at Miss USA 1962 in Miami. She went on to win the title, becoming the first entrant from Hawaii, first Asian American, and first woman of color to win the title. As Miss USA, she went on to place in the Top 15 at Miss Universe 1962, also held in Miami, behind winner Norma Nolan of Argentina. After Miss Universe, Wilson was asked to fill in for Nolan during a Miss Universe event at the Orange Bowl Parade in Miami when Nolan fell ill with the measles.

== Personal life ==
Macel is Portuguese, Hawaiian, Filipino, Chinese and English descent. Wilson attended President Theodore Roosevelt High School and Miami Dade College.

In 1967, Wilson married Danish civil engineer Jens Henrik Packness and relocated with him to Copenhagen. While in Denmark, Wilson began studying film at the University of Copenhagen and taking private painting classes. They returned to Copenhagen in 1976. Wilson became a film editor at the Danish Broadcasting Corporation (DR) in 1978, until her retirement in 2000, and has held art exhibitions in Danish galleries since 1999.
