= Noelia Voigt =

American beauty pageant titleholder (born 1999)

- Born: Noelia Victoria Voigt; November 1, 1999 (age 26); Sarasota, Florida, U.S.
- Education: University of Alabama
- Spouse: Jack Hendrix
- Beauty pageant titleholder
- Title: Miss Utah USA 2023; Miss USA 2023
- Major competitions: Miss Utah USA 2023; (Winner); Miss USA 2023; (Winner; Resigned); Miss Universe 2023; (Top 20)

Noelia Victoria Voigt Hendrix (born November 1, 1999) is an American interior designer, model and beauty pageant titleholder who was crowned Miss USA 2023 and represented the United States at the Miss Universe 2023, where she placed in the Top 20.

== Life and career ==
Voigt is the daughter of an American former baseball outfielder, Jack Voigt, and a Venezuelan, Jackeline Briceño. She is the first Venezuelan-American to earn the title Miss Utah USA and eventually Miss USA. She attended Pine View School for the Gifted in Osprey, Florida.

Voigt has said she wanted to compete in pageants as a child, but her mother made her wait until she became a teenager. After competing in her first pageant at age 16, she faced bullying by her peers which inspired her to take up a platform of anti-bullying. In 2021, Voigt authored a children's book called Maddie the BRAVE, inspired by Madison Whitsett, a 9-year-old who died by suicide after being bullied at her school in 2018.

Voigt attended the University of Alabama and is a licensed esthetician and lash technician. On September 29, 2025, she married her longtime partner Jack Hendrix.

== Pageantry ==
=== Miss USA 2023 ===
After reaching the first runner-up position at Miss Alabama-USA for the second consecutive time, she moved to South Jordan, Utah, in April 2023 and competed for the title of Miss Utah USA 2023. After winning her adoptive state pageant, she went on to represent Utah at Miss USA 2023 on September 29 in Reno, Nevada, winning and becoming their first Venezuelan-American winner and state titleholder.

During the competition, after passing through the top 20 with the swimsuit and evening gown competitions, she eventually reaching the top five, along with contestants from Hawaii, Pennsylvania, Texas, and Wisconsin. In the final question and answer round, Voigt was asked: "As the brand ambassador for Miss USA, what will be your contribution to the organization?" to which she answered:

I believe the ability to connect with people is an incredibly important asset that a Miss USA should have. The United States of America is an incredibly diverse country, probably one of the most diverse in the entire world. So being able to connect with everybody is important. As a bilingual Venezuelan-American woman, I plan to connect with that community of people because the United States of America is a diverse country and a Miss USA needs to be able to represent every community no matter their background, their race, their ethnicity, anything and I would like to be that Miss USA.

Voigt was crowned by the outgoing titleholder Morgan Romano of North Carolina as Miss USA. She later resigned her title on May 6, 2024, citing struggles with mental health. Comments on Voigt's post noted that the first letters of the sentences spelled out "I am silenced" though it was unclear if that was intentional. Savannah Gankiewicz of Hawaii, who had placed as Voigt's first runner-up, was later announced as her Miss USA successor.

=== Miss Universe 2023 ===
As Miss USA 2023, Voigt represented the U.S. at the 2023 Miss Universe pageant held in El Salvador on November 18, 2023, and reached the top 20 semi-finalists. Her national costume was based on U.S. landmarks and immigration.

Awards and achievements
Preceded by Morgan Romano, North Carolina	Miss USA; 2023	Succeeded by Savannah Gankiewicz, Hawaii
Preceded by Madison Jonely	Miss Utah USA; 2023	Succeeded by Mariluz Cook
