= Tina Machado =

Arizona businesswoman, former model

Machado in 1985

Tina Marie Machado, formerly Placourakis, (born November 11, 1959) is an American actress, businesswoman, former model, athlete and beauty pageant titleholder who was crowned Miss Hawaii USA 1985.

== Hawaii ==
Tina Marie Machado was born in Hawaii in 1959, one of four children of Marie and Harold Machado, a military family. Harold served multiple tours in Korea and Vietnam, earning a Purple Heart, Bronze Star, and Silver Star. Marie moved where the Army told them, and often raised the family alone.

Tina Machado graduated from Waipahu High School, then earned a Bachelor's degree in International business from the University of Washington in 1980. She worked as a model, and had multiple minor acting roles in the television series Hawaiian Heat, Magnum, P.I., and the film Aloha Summer (1988).

Machado was crowned Miss Hawaii USA in February 1985. She lost the title less than a week later, when pageant officials said that at 25 she was too old, and was directed to step down in favor of Toni Leimomi Costa, 18, her runner-up. Machado had already given up her job at the Honolulu Board of Realtors because of needing to devote time for the contest. Machado sued for $5 million for breach of contract, and was restored to the title in April. She competed in the Miss USA 1985 pageant in Lakeland, Florida, in May as Miss Hawaii USA and was a semi-finalist in the nationally televised pageant (won by Laura Martinez Harring of Texas). Toni Costa competed again the following year and won Miss Hawaii USA 1986.

In 1987 Machado married Hawaii restaurateur Aaron Placourakis, taking his last name. His brother, Yanni Placourakis, also a restaurateur, subsequently married Pamela Kimura, Miss Hawaii 1992. Tina and Aaron Placourakis had three children together, and regularly appeared in Hawaii society columns. Their son Jesse won three gold medals in national karate competition at age 7, and a title at the All-Japan Junior Championships at the age of 8, in 1999. Tina Placourakis followed her son to karate lessons, earning a black belt, and also winning multiple medals in national karate.

== Arizona ==
In 2000 Tina Placourakis left Hawaii to live in Arizona with former major league baseball player Charles "Chili" Davis, taking the three children, and getting an amicable divorce. In 2002, Placourakis and Davis bought a house in North Scottsdale, Arizona, that she would later remodel and have featured in Phoenix Home & Garden magazine. In 2003 Tina Placourakis filed civil suit against Davis, for assault, battery, and money spent on the house. She testified about physical and mental abuse, and played a tape recorded phone conversation of him saying "Tina, you deserved to get hit". The jury awarded her $350,000 in damages.

In 2006 Placourakis appeared as "The Divorced Mom", on the CBS reality television program Tuesday Night Book Club, where she was described as a former beauty queen and karate champion, the oldest of seven Scottsdale, Arizona women who gathered to discuss their lives and relationships. The show was pulled after two episodes out of its scheduled eight due to poor ratings.

In 2007 Tina Marie Placourakis was working for the Sherman Oaks, California-based Diversified Lending Group, when it bought Phoenix, Arizona-based private label water bottling company, Sun West Bottlers, LLC, as a subsidiary, and appointed her president and chief operating officer. She oversaw an expansion of the company, buying a local competitor, and had plans to expand even further, out of state. In 2009, the Securities and Exchange Commission charged Diversified Lending Group, and its head, Bruce Fred Friedman, with operating a $216 million Ponzi scheme. Placourakis was named as a relief defendant (not accused of wrongdoing), and asked to return $275,000 Friedman had given her. Placourakis said Sun West would not be affected. In 2010, Sun West Bottlers was acquired by NutriPure Beverages, Inc.

After Sun West, Tina Machado (returning to her maiden name), worked with Gerald Schwalbach of Spensa Development Group. They co-founded Rarity Investments in 2012, which funds new and emerging technology companies. Then, in 2013, they launched CodeRed-I, a mobile application development studio, with Machado as CEO. Her latest project is Bridge the Gap Strategy, a business consulting company. In 2015, Machado was listed among the most influential women in Arizona business by Arizona Business Magazine.

== Family ==
Machado's son, Jesse Placourakis, works with her at Rarity and CodeRed-I. Daughter Lexi Placourakis is a noted plus-size model, and has a son with Dallas Cowboys football player Tyron Smith.
