= Miss USA 1971 =

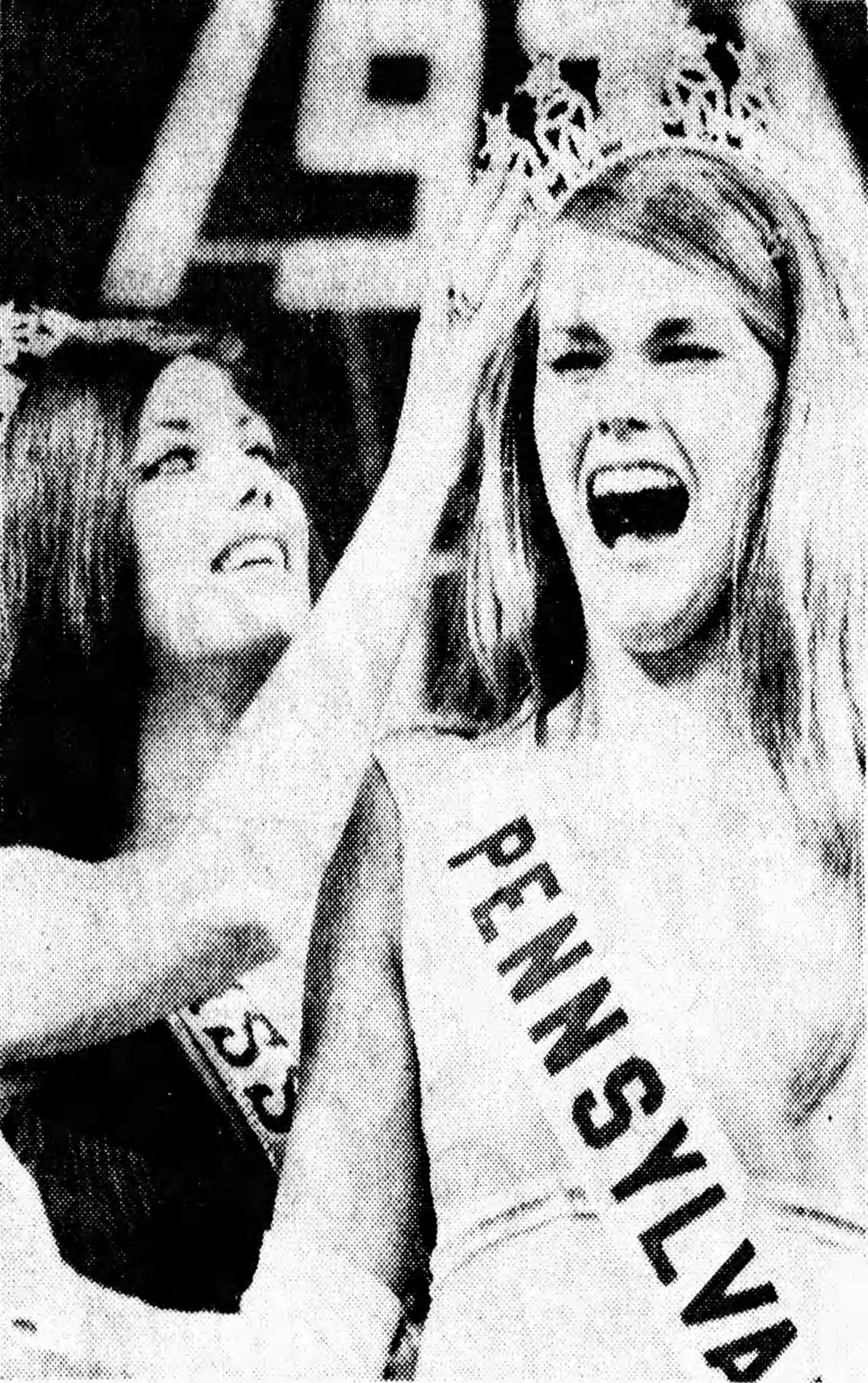
- Miss USA 1970 Deborah Shelton crowning Michele McDonald as Miss USA 1971
- Date: May 22, 1971
- Presenters: Bob Barker
- Venue: Jackie Gleason Auditorium, Miami Beach, Florida
- Broadcaster: CBS, WTVJ
- Entrants: 51
- Placements: 12
- Winner: Michele McDonald; Pennsylvania
- Congeniality: Diane Knaub; Colorado
- Photogenic: Brenda Miller; Virginia

Miss USA 1971 was the 20th Miss USA pageant, televised live by CBS hosted by Bob Barker from the Jackie Gleason Auditorium in Miami Beach, Florida on May 22, 1971.

The pageant was won by Michele McDonald of Pennsylvania, who was crowned by outgoing titleholder Deborah Shelton of Virginia. McDonald was the first – and to date only – woman from Pennsylvania to win the Miss USA title, and went on to place as a semi-finalist at Miss Universe 1971.

For the 1971 pageant, the number of semi-finalists called was reduced from 15 to 12. It would remain at this number until 1984, when it was cut again to 10.

== Results ==
Final results	Contestant
Miss USA 1971	Pennsylvania – Michele McDonald
1st Runner-Up	Texas – Brenda Box
2nd Runner-Up	Arizona – Susanne Pottenger
3rd Runner-Up	Missouri – Nancy Rich
4th Runner-Up	Kentucky – Patricia Barnstable
Top 12	California – Karin Morrell; (Washington, D.C.) District of Columbia – Suzanne Pluskoski; Florida – Susan Deaton; Maryland – Carol Theis; Michigan – Pat Glannan; Vermont – Sandra Taft; Virginia – Brenda Miller

=== Special awards ===
Award	Contestant
Miss Congeniality	Colorado – Diane Knaub
Miss Photogenic	Virginia – Brenda Miller

== Delegates ==
The Miss USA 1971 delegates were:

- Alabama - Renee Smith
- Alaska - Katherine Hartman
- Arizona - Susanne Pottenger
- Arkansas - Paula Keith
- California - Karin Morrell
- Colorado - Diane Knaub
- Connecticut - Diane Turetsky
- Delaware - Nanette Crist
- District of Columbia - Suzanne Pluskoski
- Florida - Susan Deaton
- Georgia - Jenny Andrews
- Hawaii - Deborah Gibson
- Idaho - Kristeen Riordan
- Illinois - Paulette Breen
- Indiana - Deborah Downhour
- Iowa - Cindy Helmers
- Kansas - Nancy Bishop
- Kentucky - Patricia Barnstable
- Louisiana - Diane Risenstein
- Maine - Ruth McCleery
- Maryland - Carol Theis
- Massachusetts - April Dow
- Michigan - Pat Glannan
- Minnesota - Shirley Kittleson
- Mississippi - Janey Gillis
- Missouri - Nancy Rich
- Montana - Rebecca Thomas
- Nebraska - Lola Butler
- Nevada - Anita Laurie
- New Hampshire - Jane Laroche
- New Jersey - Brenda White
- New Mexico - Debbie Clary
- New York - Barbara Lopez
- North Carolina - Mary Rudroff
- North Dakota - Joanne Engel
- Ohio - Karen Haus
- Oklahoma - Kim Hardesty
- Oregon - Connie Oost
- Pennsylvania - Michele McDonald
- Rhode Island - Laurie Stahle
- South Carolina - Eunice Campbell
- South Dakota - Sonia Hart
- Tennessee - Sue Collins
- Texas - Brenda Box
- Utah - Janet Montgomery
- Vermont - Sandra Taft
- Virginia - Brenda Miller
- Washington - Christine McComb
- West Virginia - Peggy Tennant
- Wisconsin - Pamela Martin
- Wyoming - Kay Heaton

== Judges ==
- Willis Reed
- Wilhelmina
- Bob Lardine
- Bert Bacharach, Sr.
- Richard J. Knight
- Jane Kean
- Ben Novack
- Bobbi Johnson
- George Lindsey
- Hy Gardner
- Cindy Adams
