= Miss Bénin =

National beauty pageant competition in Benin

Comite Miss Bénin
- Formation: 1962; 64 years ago
- Type: Beauty pageant
- Headquarters: Cotonou
- Location: Benin
- Official language: French
- Director: Association Culturelle Miss Bénin (ACMB)
- Website: missbenin.net

Miss Bénin (formerly known as Miss Dahomey) is the national beauty pageant in Benin. The pageant winner aims to be a cultural ambassador of Benin. Before that Miss Benin experienced Miss Universe 1962 once.

== History ==
Debuted in 1962 as Miss Dahomey pageant, Benin competed internationally at Miss Universe 1962 in Miami, Florida.

== Titleholders ==
Year	Miss Bénin	Department
1962	Gilette Hazoume	Ouémé
1995	Corine Affoyone	Porto-Novo
2011	Sahadath Sorokou	Borgou
2012	Fatouma Boubacar Mamane	Donga
2013	Nadia Sèna Dossa	Ouémé
2014	Belleciane Fifonsi Hounvènou	Ouémé
2015	Sylvania Fandohan	Zou
2016	Larissa Adjagba	Ouémé
2018	Christelle Lougbégnon	Collines

== Past titleholders under Miss Bénin org. ==
=== Miss Universe Bénin ===
- : Declared as Winner
- : Ended as runner-up or top 5/6 qualification
- : Ended as one of the finalists or semi-finalists
- : Ended as special awards winner

Year	Department	Miss Bénin	Placement at Miss Universe	Special Award(s)	Notes
Did not compete between 1963—present
1962	Ouémé	Gilette Hazoume	Unplaced		Competed as Miss Dahomey. Dahomey refers to both a West African kingdom that existed from approximately 1600 to 1904 and a French colony that later became the Republic of Dahomey, which later changed its name to Benin in 1975.
