= Michele McDonald =

American model (1952–2020)

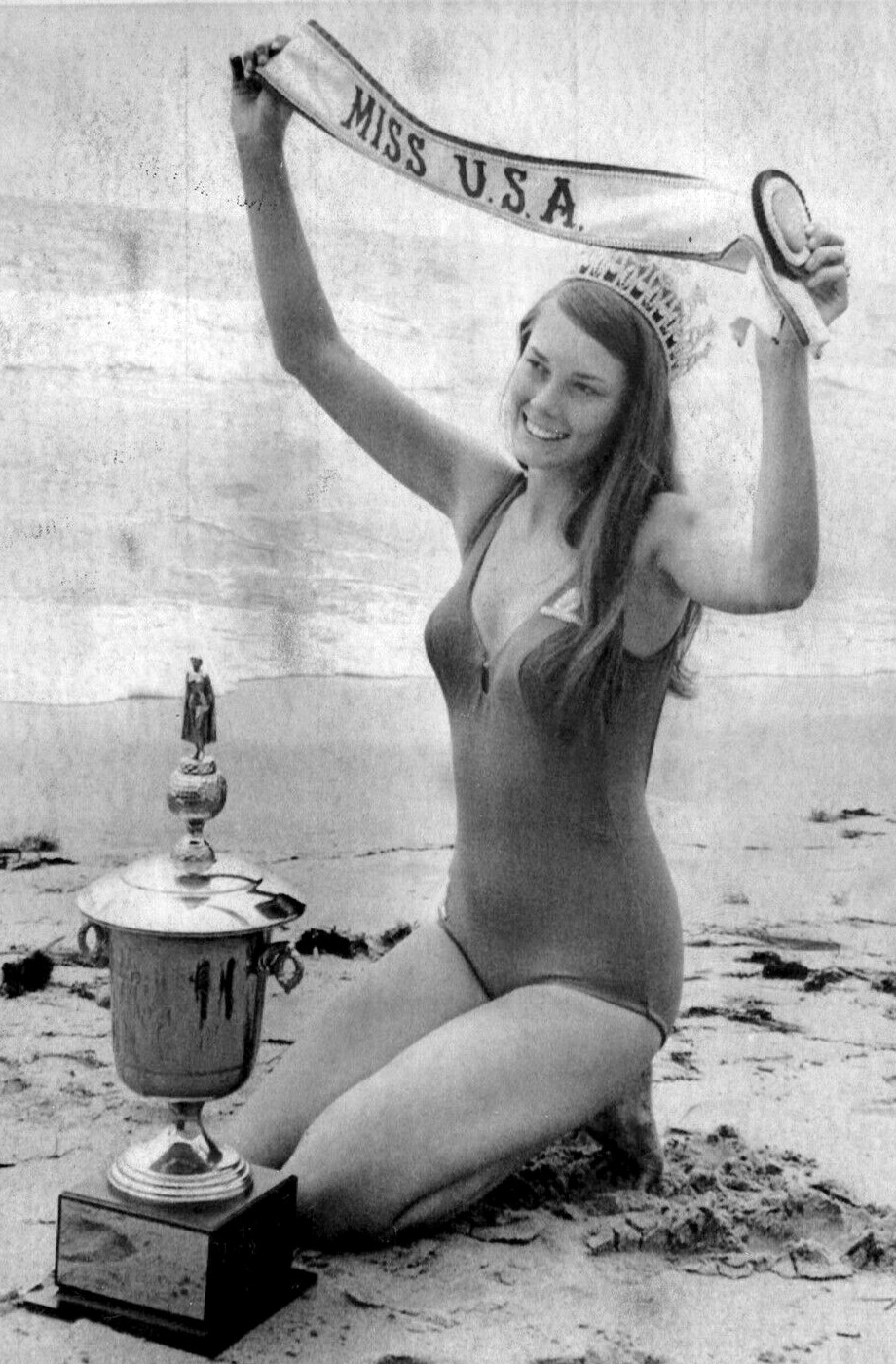
- McDonald poses after winning Miss USA 1971
- Born: Michele Marlene McDonald; June 26, 1952; Butler, Pennsylvania, U.S.
- Died: January 23, 2020 (aged 67); Saxonburg, Pennsylvania, U.S.
- Height: 5 ft 8 in (1.73 m)
- Children: 3
- Beauty pageant titleholder
- Title: Miss Pennsylvania USA 1971; Miss USA 1971
- Hair color: Red
- Eye color: Brown
- Major competitions: Miss USA 1971 (Winner); Miss Universe 1971 (Top 12)

Michele Marlene McDonald-Boeke (née McDonald; June 26, 1952 – January 23, 2020) was an American model and beauty pageant titleholder who was crowned Miss USA 1971. As Miss USA, she represented the United States at Miss Universe 1971, where she placed in the top twelve. McDonald had previously been crowned Miss Pennsylvania USA 1971, and was the first woman from Pennsylvania to win the Miss USA title.

== Early life ==
McDonald was born in Butler, Pennsylvania, to parents Richard C. and Nancy McDonald (née Walker). She was one of four children. McDonald attended Knoch High School in nearby Saxonburg, Pennsylvania, and graduated in 1971.

== Pageantry ==
=== Miss USA 1971 ===
McDonald began her pageantry career after being encouraged by her mother to enter the Miss Pennsylvania USA competition in 1971. After winning the title, McDonald was given the opportunity to represent Pennsylvania at Miss USA 1971 in Miami Beach, Florida. She went on to win the title in the nationally televised competition, becoming the first woman from Pennsylvania to win. An 18-year-old senior at Knoch High School, McDonald was additionally the first high schooler to win the competition and the youngest woman in ten years. She missed her senior prom while competing in Miss USA, and returned to her hometown the weekend after winning the title to participate in her high school graduation; she arrived from the airport in a motorcade and was greeted by thousands of people and dignitaries from her hometown.

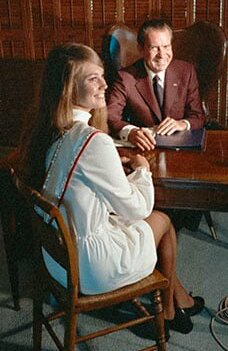
McDonald with President Nixon in 1971

The day after winning the competition, she and her parents visited Richard Nixon and his wife Pat Nixon at their summer home in Key Biscayne.

Later in the year, McDonald represented the United States at Miss Universe 1971 in Miami Beach. After having lost ten pounds in a crash diet encouraged by Miss Universe officials, a chaperone stated that McDonald was close to exhaustion due to the diet, and a doctor had also criticized the method of weight loss. McDonald advanced to the top twelve in the competition, which was eventually won by Miss Lebanon, Georgina Rizk.

Before competing in Miss USA, McDonald had never left Pennsylvania nor flown in an airplane. During her reign, she visited thirty of the fifty states, and additionally traveled to international destinations such as Brazil and the Bahamas. As part of her winning prize, she was awarded $5,000 in cash, a $5,000 mink coat, and $5,000 in appearance fees. McDonald was succeeded as Miss USA by Tanya Wilson of Hawaii, and had planned to attend nursing school after finishing her reign. Before beginning nursing school, she lived in New York City for a year and modeled with Ford Models. McDonald's high school boyfriend proposed to her in the last months of her reign.

== Personal life ==
McDonald had three children and four grandchildren at the time of her death. She lived the majority of her life in Dayton, Ohio, with her partner of 37 years Jeffrey Sturgill. They relocated back to Butler County in 2015, where they lived in Sarver, Pennsylvania.

== Death ==
In June 2018, McDonald underwent a life-saving double lung transplant at UPMC Presbyterian Hospital in Pittsburgh. She died on January 23, 2020, in a nursing home in Saxonburg, Pennsylvania, from complications related to the surgery.
