= Savannah Gankiewicz =

American beauty pageant winner (born 1995)

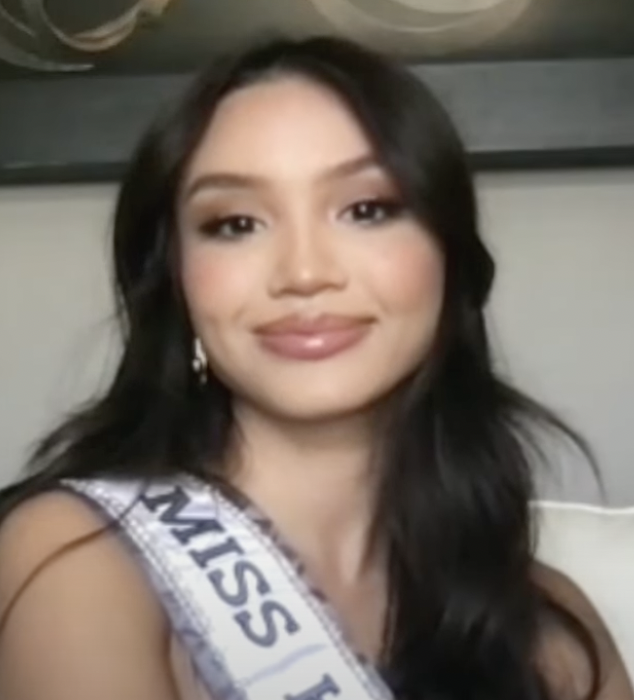
- Gankiewicz in 2023
- Born: Savannah Marʻi Gankiewicz; November 28, 1995 (age 30); Oahu, Hawaii, U.S.
- Education: George Mason University
- Beauty pageant titleholder
- Title: Miss Hawaii USA 2023; Miss USA 2023
- Major competitions: Mutya ng Pilipinas 2017; (Mutya ng Pilipinas Overseas Filipino Communities); Miss Hawaii USA 2023; (Winner); Miss USA 2023; (1st Runner-Up) (Note: Gankiewicz was originally first runner-up, but became Miss USA after the original titleholder, Noelia Voigt, resigned.)

Savannah Mari Gankiewicz (born November 28, 1995) is an American beauty pageant titleholder who was crowned Miss USA 2023. Gankiewicz is the fifth woman from Hawaii to become Miss USA.

Gankiewic won Miss Hawaii USA 2023, and was the first runner-up at Miss USA, receiving the title after the original winner Noelia Voigt resigned in May 2024.

== Early life and education ==
Gankiewicz was born on Oahu to parents Yvienne Tagorda Peterson and Mark Gankiewicz; her mother is from Maui and of Filipina descent, while her father is of Polish and Vietnamese descent. Her mother had a background in pageantry, having been crowned Mrs. Maui and serving as a director for the Miss Maui Filipina pageant. Gankiewicz spent the first six years of her life with her family on Maui, and later lived between Maui and Stephenson, Virginia, where her father relocated.

Gankiewicz was educated in Virginia, attending Sherando High School in Frederick County, Virginia and George Mason University in Fairfax County, Virginia. She later returned to Hawaii at age 21, settling in Kihei, Hawaii on Maui, where she began working as a professional model and a marketing coordinator at The Agency Maui.

== Pageantry ==
Gankiewicz moved to the Philippines to model and competed in Mutya ng Pilipinas 2017, where she was a finalist and received the title of Mutya ng Pilipinas Overseas Filipino Communities for representing the Filipino-Hawaiian community. Following the pageant, she continued to live in the Philippines to work as a model for over a year.

Gankiewicz entered and won Miss Hawaii USA 2023, competing as Miss Wailea. She was also awarded Miss Photogenic. Aged 27 at the time of her win, Gankiewicz opted to compete in her final year of age eligibility as she had wanted to wait until she felt ready for the responsibilities of being a state titleholder. With her win, Gankiewicz became the first woman from Maui to be crowned Miss Hawaii USA in over 20 years.

=== Miss USA 2023 ===
As Miss Hawaii USA, Gankiewicz entered Miss USA 2023. The competition was held on September 29, 2023, in Reno, Nevada and aired on The CW. During the state costume portion of the pageant, Gankiewicz wore a costume paying tribute to the victims of the 2023 wildfire in Lahaina, Hawaii on her home island of Maui, for which she won the Best State Costume award. Gankiewicz was the first runner-up in the competition, behind winner Noelia Voigt of Utah, and additionally won the Best in Interview award. Gankiewicz later crowned Breea Yamat as her successor at the Miss Hawaii USA 2024 pageant in April 2024.

In May 2024, Voigt announced that she was resigning her title as Miss USA, citing her struggles with mental health. Later that day, it was reported in the Hawaiian media that Gankiewicz had been asked to take over the Miss USA title. Due to pageant protocol, the first runner-up is asked to step in to fulfill the duties of Miss USA should the winner be unable to, and on May 9, it was announced that Gankiewicz would assume the title of Miss USA 2023. Gankiewicz was later officially crowned as Miss USA 2023 by Josh Green, the governor of Hawaii, in a ceremony held on May 15 in the neighborhood of Waikiki in Honolulu. Following this, she became the fifth woman from Hawaii to be crowned Miss USA.

== Notes ==
Awards and achievements
Preceded by Noelia Voigt (Utah)	Miss USA; 2023	Succeeded by Alma Cooper (Michigan)
Preceded by Kiana Yamat	Miss Hawaii USA; 2023	Succeeded by Breea Yamat
