= Venado Tuerto =

- City
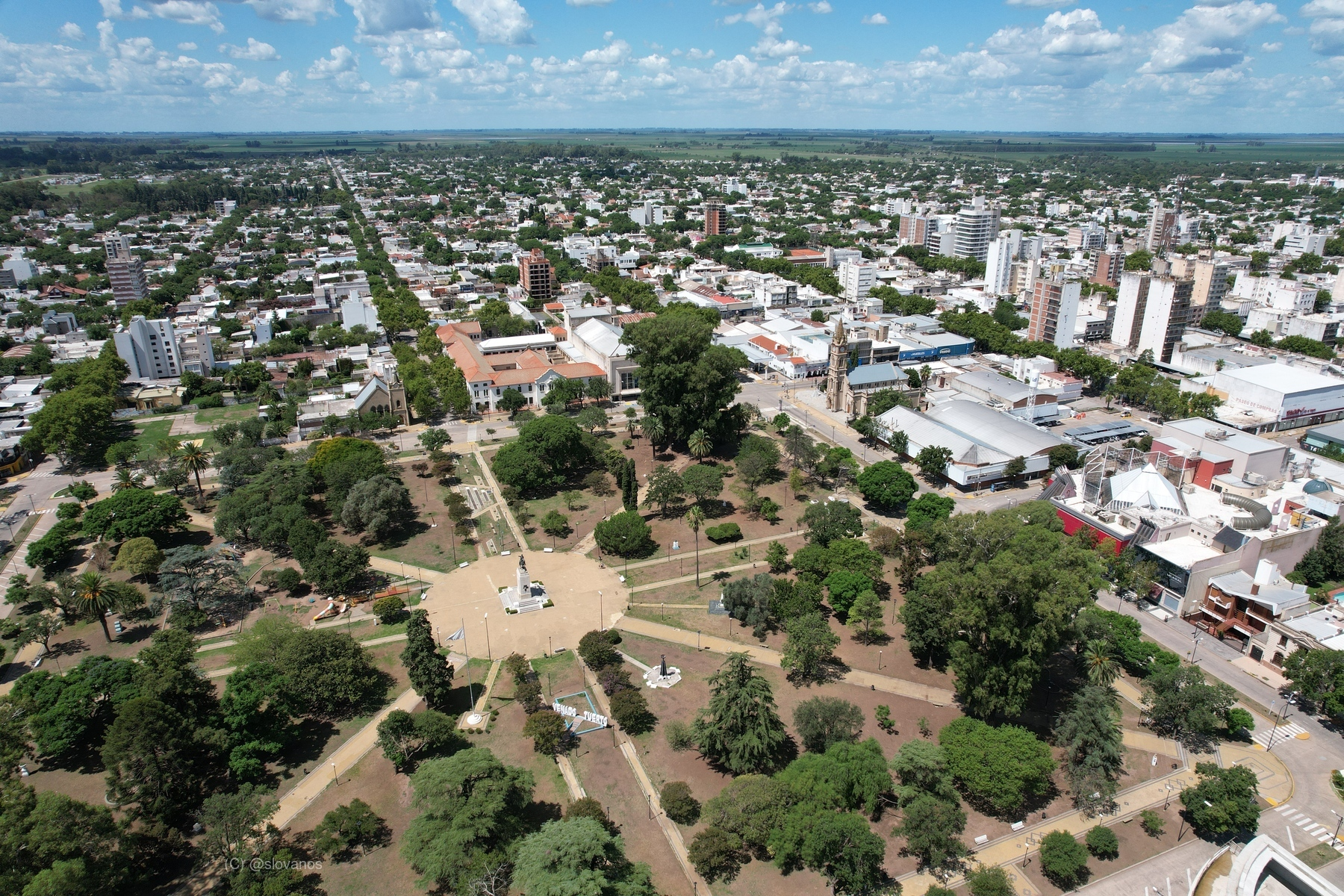
- Aerial photograph of Venado Tuerto

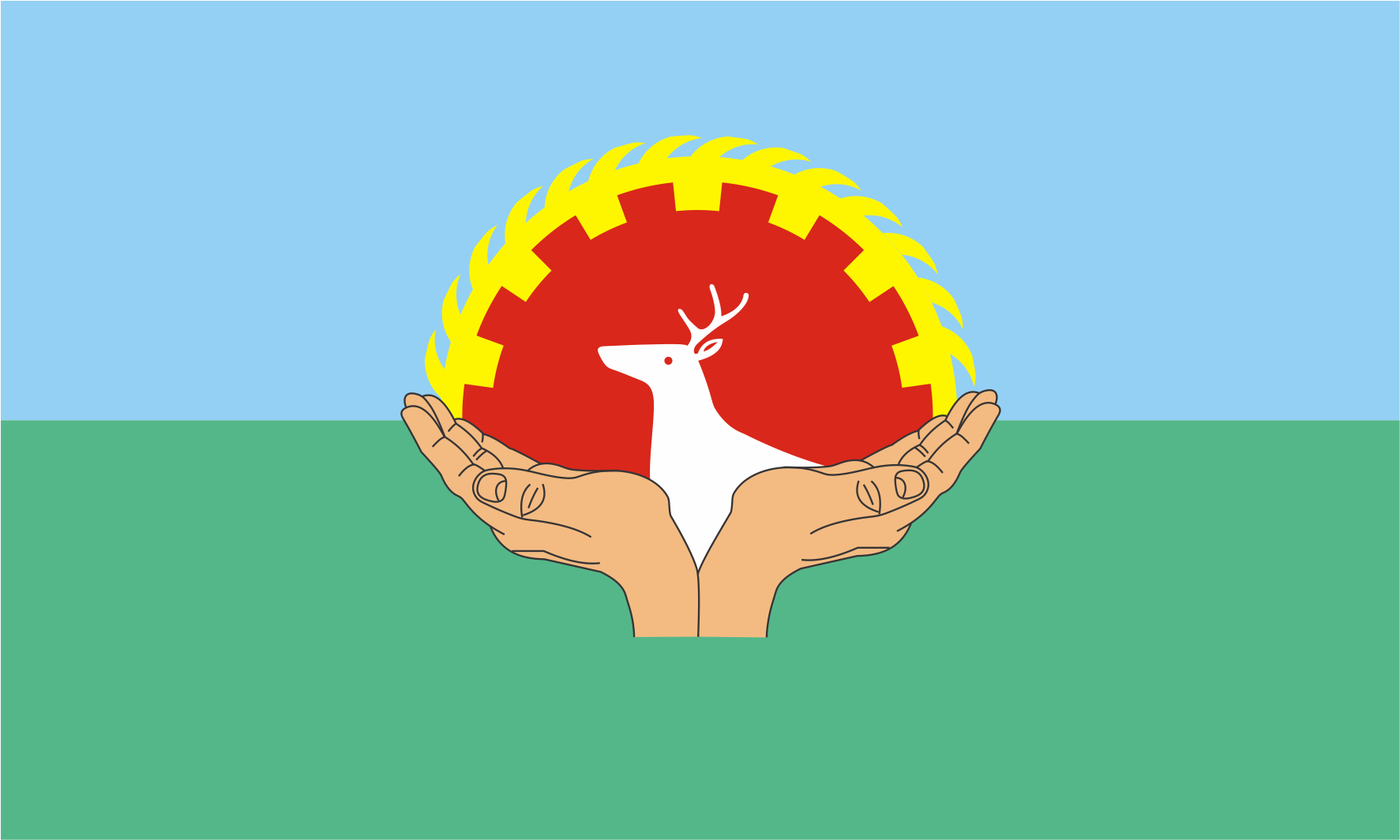
- Flag
- Nickname: La esmeralda del sur
- Location of Venado Tuerto in Argentina
- Coordinates: 33°45′S 61°58′W
- Country: Argentina
- Province: Santa Fe
- Department: General López
- Founded: April 26, 1884
- Founder: Eduardo Casey

Government
  - Intendant: Leonel Chiarella (Unión Cívica Radical)

Area
  - Total: 47.05 km^{2} (18.17 sq mi)
- Elevation: 111 m (364 ft)

Population (2010 census)
  - Total: 76,432
  - Density: 1,624/km^{2} (4,207/sq mi)
- Demonym: Venadense/s
- Time zone: UTC−3 (ART)
- ZIP: S2600
- Dialing code: +54 3462
- Website: venadotuerto.gob.ar

Venado Tuerto (Spanish pronunciation: [beˈnaðo ˈtweɾto]) (Spanish for One Eyed Deer) is a city in the south-west of the province of Santa Fe, Argentina, 322 km from the provincial capital. It has about 76,000 inhabitants (2010 census [INDEC]).

== History ==
Venado Tuerto was founded on April 26, 1884 by Eduardo Casey, born in Lobos, Buenos Aires, in 1847. He was the son of two Irish immigrants who had amassed considerable wealth. Casey bought a large extension of land from where the natives had been recently expelled, to be employed for farming and horse breeding. The land purchase was reportedly one of the most expensive real estate transactions in Argentine history at that time.

The name of the town literally means one-eyed deer, and its origin is unknown, though several folk legends circulate around it. According to local legend, a one-eyed deer that lived near a lagoon would alert the inhabitants of the nearby fort (fortín) about approaching indigenous raids, earning it a special place in local folklore. In any case, the name was not considered tasteful by some, and on several occasions a change was formally requested, mainly to 'Ciudad Casey' ('Casey City'), though never carried out.

The town was declared a city on December 16, 1935. The city is known as "La Esmeralda del Sur" (The Emerald of the South) and is also recognized as the birthplace of the "Marcha de San Lorenzo" (San Lorenzo March), composed by Uruguayan musician Cayetano Silva in 1901.

== Economy ==
Venado Tuerto's economy is primarily based on agriculture and agro-industry. The surrounding region is highly productive for cultivation of soybeans, corn, wheat, and other grains. The city serves as an important commercial and service center for the surrounding agricultural region.

== Notable people ==
- Norma Beatriz Nolan (born 1938) Miss Universe 1962
- Leo Genovese (born 1979) Jazz musician
- Chris de Burgh (born 1948), musician, was born here
- Federico Lussenhoff (born 1974), ex-footballer
- Guillermo Coria (born 1982), professional tennis player
