= Miss Pennsylvania USA =

Beauty pageant competition

- Formation: 1952
- Type: Beauty pageant
- Headquarters: Cincinnati
- Location: Ohio
- Members: Miss USA
- Official language: English
- Key people: Melissa Proctor-Pitchford, State Pageant Director
- Website: Official website

The Miss Pennsylvania USA competition is the pageant that selects the representative for the state of Pennsylvania in the Miss USA pageant. It has been previously known as Miss Pennsylvania Universe. This pageant is independently conducted and produced by Proctor Productions based in Cincinnati, Ohio. It was produced by Sanders & Associates, Inc., dba- Pageant Associates based in Buckhannon, West Virginia from 2001 to 2020. Since 2020 the pageant based in Cincinnati, Ohio.

The annual competition is currently held in Johnstown and has previously been hosted by Harrisburg, Greensburg, Monroeville, and Pittsburgh.

Michele McDonald, Miss USA 1971, is the only woman from Pennsylvania to win the Miss USA title. At eighteen, she was the youngest competitor ever to win the crown. Their most recent placement came in 2026 when Elizabeth Voight placed 2nd runner-up.

The current titleholder is Elizabeth Voight of Fredericksburg was appointed Miss Pennsylvania USA 2026 on June 30th, 2026 after the open casting call from Thomas Brodeur, the new owner of the national pageant. She represented Pennsylvania at Miss USA 2026, finishing as 2nd runner-up.

== Gallery of titleholders ==
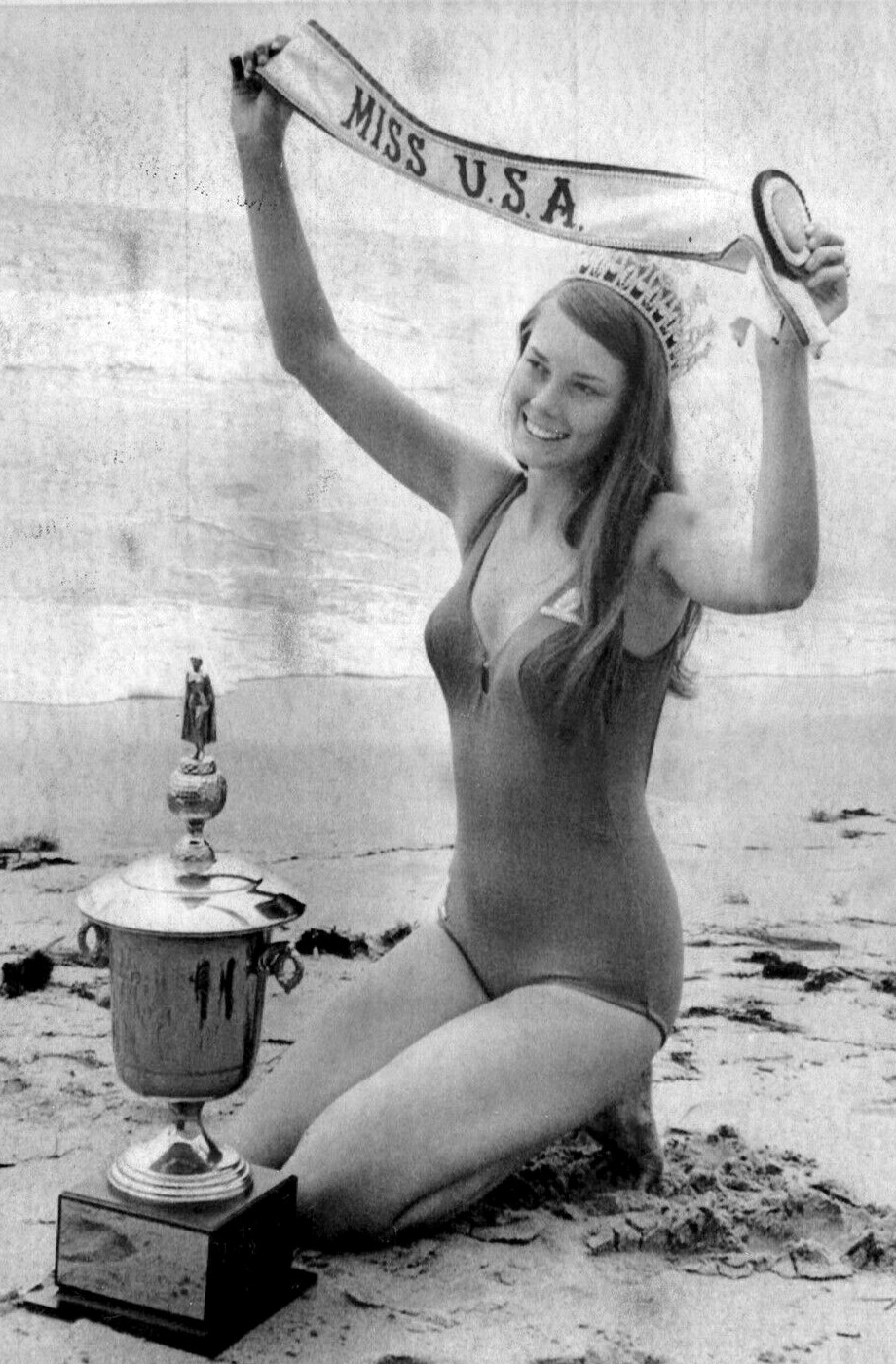
Michele McDonald, Miss Pennsylvania USA 1971 & Miss USA 1971

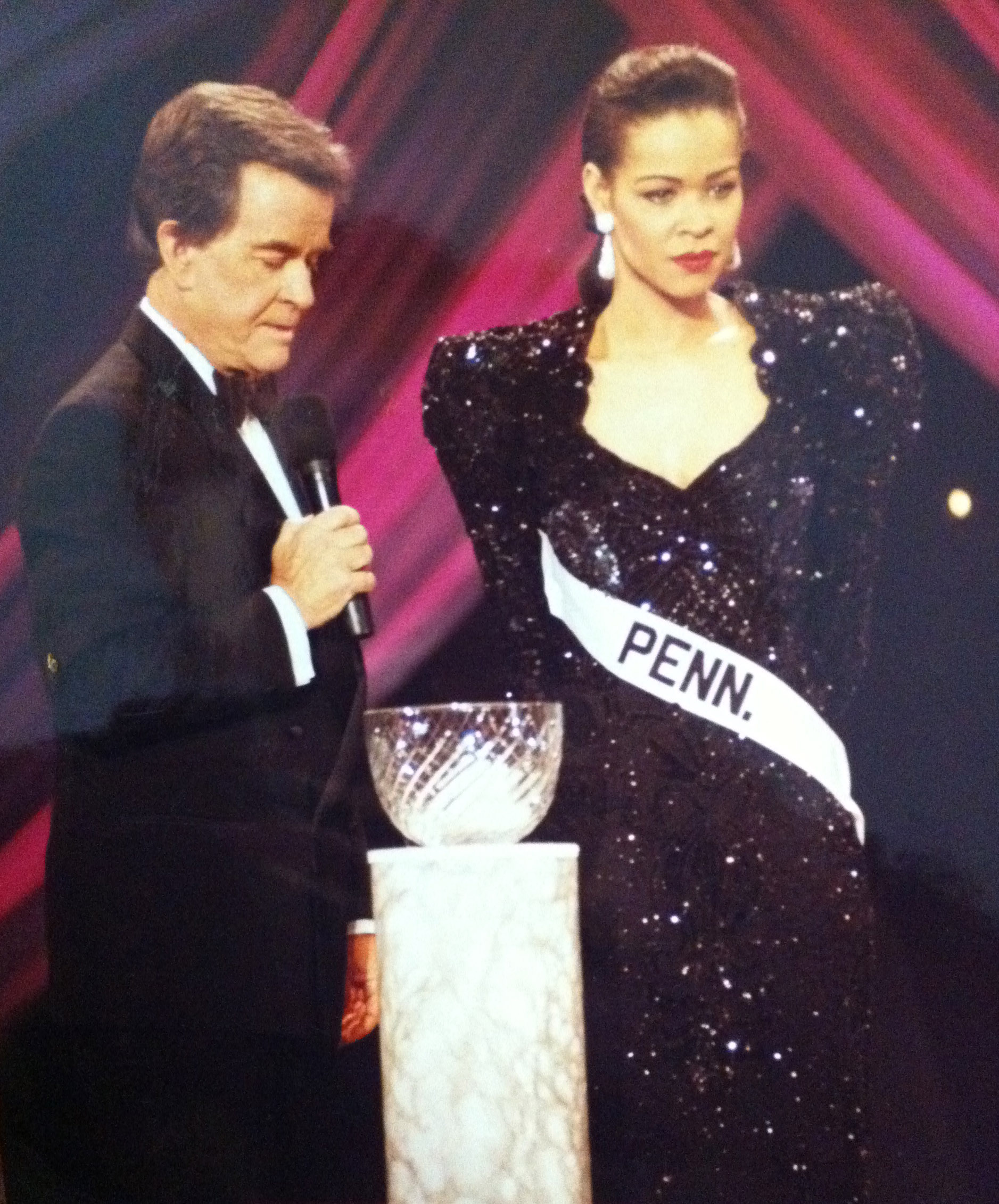
Kimmarie Johnson, Miss Pennsylvania USA 1993

Tanya Lehman, Miss Pennsylvania USA 2006

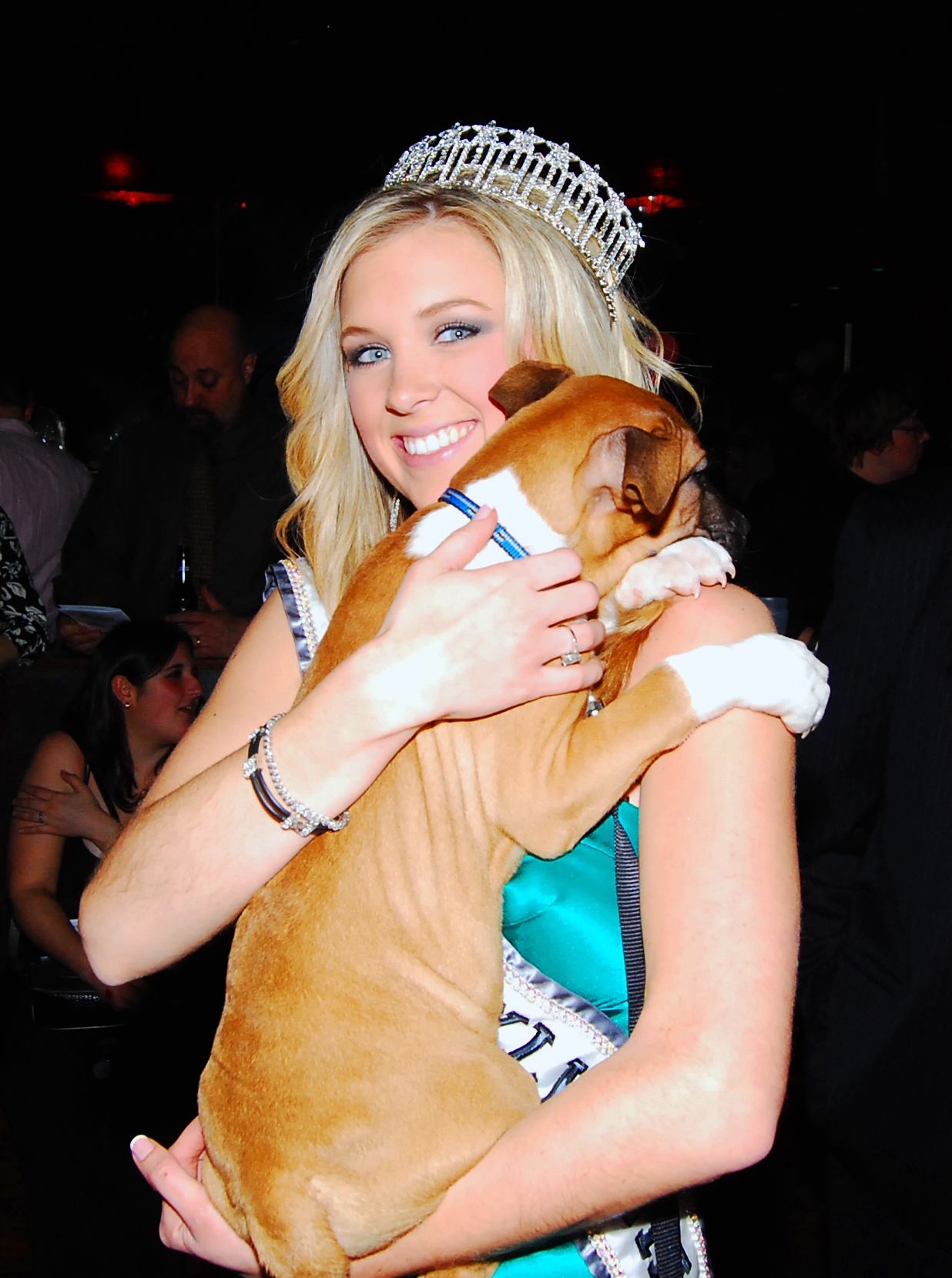
Lindsey Nelsen, Miss Pennsylvania USA 2009

== Results summary ==
- Miss USA: Michele McDonald (1971)
- 2nd runner-up: Elizabeth Voight (2026)
- 3rd runner-up: Jasmine Daniels (2023)
- 4th runners-up: LauRen Merola (2008)
- Top 6: Kimmarie Johnson (1993)
- Top 10/12: Sandy Dell (1978), Julie Page (1983), Denise Epps (1989), Brenda Brabham (2005)
- Top 15/16/20: Jeri Bauer (1953), Margaret Lineman (1962), Barbara Ann Woronko (1967), Gina Cerilli (2010), Jessica Billings (2013), Valerie Gatto (2014), Kailyn Marie Perez (2019)

Pennsylvania holds a record of 16 placements at Miss USA.

=== Awards ===
- Best State Costume: Julie Page (1983)
- Best in Swimsuit: Barbara Ann Woronko (1967)
- Best in Evening Gown: Jasmine Daniels (2023)
- Miss Photogenic: Sydney Robertson (2021)

== Winners ==
Color key

- Winner
- Runner-up or Finalist
- Semifinalist

Year	Name	City	Age (Note: Age at the time of the crowning)	Local title	Placement at Miss USA	Special awards at Miss USA	Notes
2026	Elizabeth Voight	Fredericksburg	26	Miss Fredericksburg	2nd runner-up		
2025	Rica Clements	York	29	Miss York			
2024	Noni Diarra	Philadelphia	23	Miss Philadelphia			
2023	Jasmine Daniels	Collegeville	26	Miss Collegeville	3rd runner-up	Best in Evening Gown	Previously Miss Pennsylvania Teen USA 2015; Semi-finalist at Miss Teen USA 2015
2022	Billie LaRaé Owens	Phoenixville	25	Miss Upper Providence			Daughter of former basketball player Billy Owens
2021	Sydney Robertson	Williamsport	23	Miss Williamsport		Miss Photogenic	Previously Miss Pennsylvania Teen USA 2014; 2nd runner-up at Miss Teen USA 2014
2020	Victoria Piekut	Irwin	23				Previously International Junior Miss Teen 2015; Longest reigning Miss Pennsylvania USA (1 year, 8 months, and 28 days)
2019	Kailyn Marie Perez	Camp Hill	27		Top 15		Previously Miss Florida World 2015; Top 12 at Miss World America 2015
2018	Olivia Ann Suchko	Belle Vernon	21				
2017	Cassandra Lee Angst	Philadelphia	22				
2016	Elena Flora LaQuatra	Pittsburgh	23				Triple crown winner; deaf since age 4 due to bacterial meningitis: Previously Miss Pennsylvania's Outstanding Teen 2007; 2nd runner-up at Miss America's Outstanding Teen 2008; Previously Miss Pennsylvania Teen USA 2010
2015	Elizabeth Lee Cardillo	Pittsburgh	24				
2014	Valerie Gatto	Pittsburgh	24		Top 20		
2013	Jessica Billings	Berwyn	26		Top 15		
Title vacant
2012	Sheena Monnin	Pittsburgh	26				Resigned the title after the Miss USA competition, alleging that the pageant was a fraud.; Shortest reigning Miss Pennsylvania USA (6 months and 1 day)
2011	Amber-Joi Watkins	Philadelphia	26				Former Sixers Dancer
2010	Gina Domenica Cerilli	Greensburg	23		Top 15		Former Philadelphia Eagles Cheerleader
2009	Lindsey Nelsen	Stewartstown	21				
2008	LauRen Merola	Pittsburgh	23		4th runner-up		Former Miami Dolphins Cheerleader
2007	Samantha Johnson	Philadelphia	22				
2006	Tanya Lehman	York	22				
2005	Brenda Brabham	Philadelphia	24		Top 10		
2004	Nicole Georghalli	East Stroudsburg	25				
2003	Camille Young	Philadelphia	23				
2002	Nicole Bigham	Belle Vernon	25				Previously Miss Pennsylvania Teen USA 1994; top 12 at Miss Teen USA 1994
2001	Jennifer Ann Watkins	Monongahela					
2000	Angela Patla	Sweet Valley	26				
1999	Melissa Godshall	Philadelphia	25				
1998	Kimberly Jaycox	Indiana					
1997	Cara Bernosky	Whitehall					
1996	Susan Barnett	Levittown					Previously Miss Pennsylvania Teen USA 1990; top 12 at Miss Teen USA 1990
1995	Stephanie Fallat	Murrysville					
1994	Linda Chiaraluna	Evans City	23				
1993	Kimmarie Johnson	Pittsburgh			Top 6		
1992	Catherine Weber	Sarver					
1991	Adrienne Romano	Philadelphia					
1990	Elizabeth Cebak	Ross	23				Later Miss World Pennsylvania 1992; 4th runner up at Miss World USA 1992
1989	Denise Epps	Lansdale	22		Semi-finalist		
1988	Susan Gray	Lansdale	20				
1987	Lisa Rynkiewicz	Clarksville					
1986	Sherri Fitzpatrick	Quakertown	23				1983 & 1984 Professional Cheerleader for the USFL Philadelphia Stars Football Team; 1985 Professional Cheerleader for the Philadelphia Eagles
1985	Sandra Ferguson	Pittsburgh	18				Played Amanda Cory on Another World
1984	Tina Albright	Lansford					
1983	Julie Page	Belle Vernon	18		Semi-finalist	Best State Costume	
1982	Theresa Rosa	North Versailles					
1981	Nena Stone	Bethel Park	21				
1980	Andrea Patrick	Connellsville					Later Miss West Virginia 1983.; Married Fabian in 1998
1979	Maureen Starinsky	Monongahela	23				
1978	Sandy Dell	Latrobe	22		Semi-finalist		
1977	Lorraine Lincoski	Daisytown		Miss Daisytown			
1976	Marcy Zambelli	Newcastle					
1975	Pat Hurley	Wilkes-Barre					
1974	Dorisann Gatalski	Bethel Park					
1973	Jill Unbewust	Benton					
1972	Jeanie Zadrozny	Pittsburgh		Miss Allegheny			
1971	Michele McDonald	Butler			Miss USA 1971		Semi-finalist at Miss Universe 1971; Michele Marlene McDonald-Boeke died in Saxonburg, Pennsylvania on January 23, 2020, at age 67 from complications stemming from a 2018 double-lung transplant surgery.
1970	Carol Cerully	Altoona					
1969	Marlene Vaughn	Philadelphia	21				
1968	Barbara Verlander	White Oak	20				
1967	Barbara Ann Woronko	Edwardsville	17	Miss Wilkes-Barre	Semifinalist	Swimsuit Winner	Former Radio City Rockette.
1966	Susan Joanne Fennell	Philadelphia					
1965	Beverly Rudolph	Philadelphia					
1964	Maryann Reilly	Philadelphia					
1963	Deborah Cardonick	Philadelphia					
1962	Margaret Lineman	Philadelphia			Semi-finalist		
1961	Gayle Nelson	Philadelphia		Miss Chester			
1960	Betsy Reeves	Philadelphia					
1959	Rhoda Mae Kachilo	Philadelphia					
1958	Natalie Dee	Philadelphia					
1957	Rosalie Culp	Philadelphia					
1956	Serena Kifer	Philadelphia					
1955	Marianne Marcus	Philadelphia					
1954	Helen Vidovich	Philadelphia					
1953	Jeri Hauer	Hatboro			Semi-finalist		
1952	Miriam Smith	Philadelphia					
