= AZ Business Magazine =

American business magazine

- Editor-in-Chief: Michael Gossie
- Categories: Business magazine
- Frequency: Bimonthly
- Founded: 1985
- Company: AZ Big Media
- Country: United States
- Based in: Phoenix, Arizona
- Language: English
- Website: azbigmedia.com/az-business
- ISSN: 1946-9152

Arizona Business Magazine, based in Phoenix, Arizona, is a monthly business magazine published by AZ Big Media. It covers a wide range of topics regarding the Arizona business scene, aimed at high-level corporate executives and business owners.

== History ==
Arizona Business Magazine began in 1985, when publisher named Michael Atkinson purchased a 2-year-old publication called Arizona Office Guide to Phoenix, a quarterly controlled circulation magazine of 7,000 that focused solely on the Phoenix office market.

In 1986, the publication’s name was changed to Arizona Business & Development Magazine. It also broadened its commercial real estate focus and increased circulation to 20,000.

The publication's name was changed to Arizona Business Magazine in 1988. The publication expanded its readership to 25,000 as it started to cover the entire Arizona business industry. Additionally, Arizona Business Magazine switched to a bimonthly publication schedule.

Arizona Business Magazine also introduced special supplements. In partnership with area business organizations, Arizona Business Magazine publishes special sections within its pages on association groups, their work and their members. Arizona Business Magazine re-prints copies of the supplements with their own covers free of charge to each association.

== Arizona Business Magazine today ==
In February 2008, Arizona Business Magazine became a monthly publication schedule to boost its market share and distribution. Since then, the magazine has featured stories on such Arizona-based companies as U.S. Airways, Shamrock Foods, Dial Corp. and AVNET. The magazine has also addressed key economic issues in Arizona, including the sub-prime collapse, the credit crunch, international trade and sustainability. It has also covered Arizona’s immigration issue.

The list of Arizona business and community leaders profiled in the magazine includes Intel Chairman Craig Barrett, former NBA Phoenix Suns owner Jerry Colangelo, Bashas' Family of Stores Chairman Eddie Basha Jr., as well as Gov. Janet Napolitano and former Congressman J.D. Hayworth. Experts from Arizona State University's W.P. Carey School of Business are quoted within the pages of Arizona Business Magazine.

Despite the changes, the supplements remain an important part of Arizona Business Magazine. Organizations featured in the supplements include the Greater Phoenix Economic Council, Valley Forward, East Valley Partnership, the Arizona Hospital & Healthcare Association, and the Greater Phoenix Convention & Visitors Bureau.

The magazine later returned to a bimonthly publication schedule.

== Leadership ==
The top leadership at AZ Big Media consists of:

- Michael Atkinson, president and CEO
- Audrey Webb, vice president of operations
- Cheryl Green, publisher
- Michael Gossie, editor-in-chief
