= Miss USA 1985 =

34th Miss USA pageant

- Date: May 13, 1985
- Presenters: Bob Barker and Joan Van Ark
- Entertainment: Kool and The Gang, Lee Greenwood
- Venue: Lakeland Civic Auditorium, Lakeland, Florida
- Broadcaster: CBS, WTVT WCPX-TV
- Entrants: 51
- Placements: 10
- Winner: Laura Harring; Texas
- Congeniality: Martha Browning; Tennessee
- Photogenic: Robyn Overbey; Kentucky

Miss USA 1985 was the 34th Miss USA pageant, televised live from the Lakeland Civic Auditorium in Lakeland, Florida on May 13, 1985, in honor of the city's centennial anniversary with a special cameo appearance by Mayor Thomas R. Shaw. At the conclusion of the final competition, Laura Harring of Texas was crowned Miss USA 1985 by outgoing titleholder Mai Shanley of New Mexico.

Harring was the first Latina to win the crown. She later became an actress, appearing in a number of films including Mulholland Drive and as John Travolta's character's wife in The Punisher.

== Results ==
=== Placements ===
Final results	Contestant
Miss USA 1985	Texas - Laura Harring
1st Runner-Up	New Mexico - Brenda Denton
2nd Runner-Up	Illinois - Laura Ann Bach
3rd Runner-Up	Louisiana - Sarie Joubert
4th Runner-Up	Minnesota - Kari Lee Johnson
Top 10	Arizona - Michelle Ducote; Hawaii - Tina Machado; Massachusetts - Mercedes Waggoner; Missouri - Amy Ruth Coverdale; Oklahoma - Sophia Henderson

== Delegates ==
The Miss USA 1985 delegates were:

State	Name	Hometown	Age^{1}	Notes
Alabama	Allison Sawyer	Birmingham	20	
Alaska	Kari Moore	Fairbanks	18	
Arizona	Michelle Ducote	Tempe	22	
Arkansas	Susan Dean	Osceola	23	
California	Zina Ponder	Long Beach	22	
Colorado	Lynnette Jessen	Denver	23	Previously Miss Colorado 1981
Connecticut	Adrianne Hazelwood	Hamden	18	Previously Miss Wisconsin Teen USA 1984
Delaware	Sheila Saints	Wilmington	21	
(Washington, D.C.) District of Columbia	Christal Chacon	Washington, D.C.	18	
Florida	Barbi Losh	North Miami Beach	21	
(Georgia (U.S. state)) Georgia	Amanda Smith	Smyrna	24	
Hawaii	Tina Machado	Honolulu	25	
Idaho	Sheri Rose	Boise	24	
Illinois	Laura Bach	Elmhurst	23	
Indiana	Theresa Hobbs	Bloomington	23	
Iowa	Devin Steinberg	Manson	21	
Kansas	Jill Denzin	Leawood	21	
Kentucky	Robyn Overbey	Calvert City	24	
Louisiana	Sarie Joubert	Shreveport	22	
Maine	Tracie Samara	Portland	22	
Maryland	Christine Marie	Baldwin	20	
Massachusetts	Mercedes Waggoner	Boston	21	
Michigan	Nancy Mazuro	Washington	17	
Minnesota	Kari Lee Johnson	Minneapolis	20	
Mississippi	Camille Gilliland	Meridian	19	
Missouri	Amy Coverdale	Columbia	22	
Montana	Julie Knox	Bozeman	19	
Nebraska	Lori Straight	Omaha	20	
Nevada	Alicia Berger	Las Vegas	19	Entertainment reporter for KVBC-DT and regular contributor for Access Hollywood
New Hampshire	Janice LaCroix	Manchester	21	Originally first runner-up after Rhonda Niles dethroned due to stealing clothes during the state pageant competition
New Jersey	Francie Knapp	Linwood	24	
New Mexico	Brenda Denton	Hobbs	21	Represented the United States in Miss World 1985 where she placed as Second Runner Up
(New York (state)) New York	Lovey King	Yonkers	20	
North Carolina	Kate Kenney	Raleigh	23	
North Dakota	Regina Schatz	Fargo	22	
Ohio	Lisa Barlow	Vandalia	22	
Oklahoma	Sophia Henderson	Tulsa	21	
Oregon	Jodi Unruh	Eugene	20	
Pennsylvania	Sandi Ferguson	Jefferson Hills	18	
Rhode Island	Dana Wilson	Riverside	21	
South Carolina	Ann Margarete Hughes	Summerville	23	
South Dakota	Stacey Arnold	Rapid City	21	
Tennessee	Martha Browning	Chattanooga	24	First deaf Miss USA contestant.
Texas	Laura Harring	El Paso	21	Born in Mexico
Utah	Kim Thompson	Salt Lake City	18	
Vermont	Angie Cummingham	Rutland	20	
Virginia	Dana Bryant	Richmond	18	
(Washington (state)) Washington	Sherry Rials	Bellevue	23	
West Virginia	Lorre Lewis	Barboursville	20	
Wisconsin	Deborah Lynn Strauss	Thiensville	22	
Wyoming	Wendy Hartwigsen	Gillette	19	

== See also ==
- Miss Universe 1985
- Miss Teen USA 1985
