= Norma Nolan =

Argentine beauty queen (1938–2025)

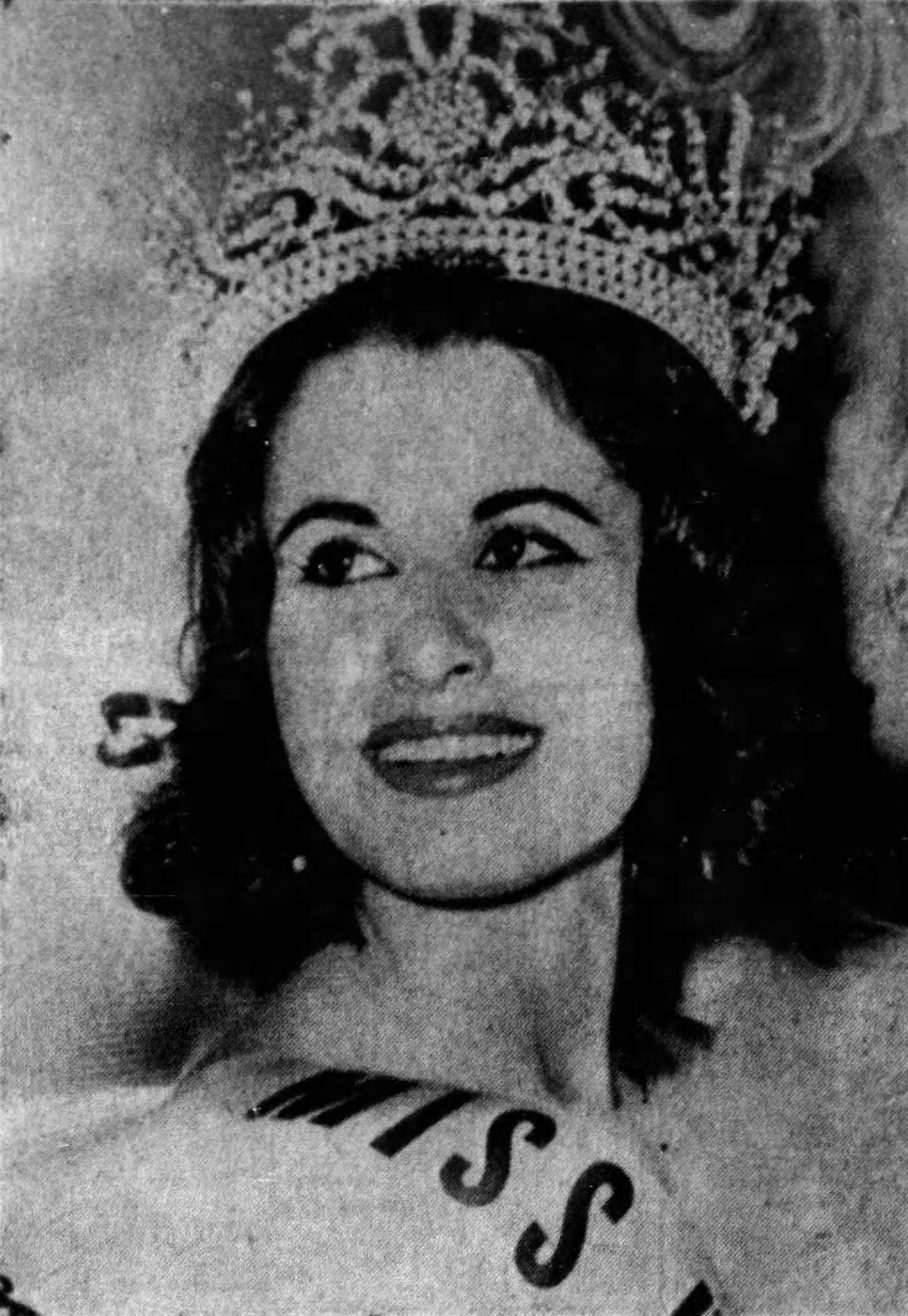
- Nolan in 1962
- Born: Norma Beatriz Nolan; 22 April 1938; Venado Tuerto, Argentina
- Died: 20 August 2025 (aged 87); Miami, Florida, U.S.
- Beauty pageant titleholder
- Title: Miss Argentina 1962; Miss Universe 1962
- Hair color: Dark Brown
- Eye color: Dark Brown
- Major competitions: Miss Argentina 1962 (Winner); Miss Universe 1962 (Winner)

Norma Beatriz Nolan (22 April 1938 – 20 August 2025) was an Argentine model and beauty queen who was the first woman from Argentina to win the Miss Universe title.

== Life and career ==
Nolan was born on 22 April 1938. She was of Irish and Italian descent. Nolan was crowned Miss Argentina in 1962 by her predecessor, Adriana Gardiazábal, who was the second runner-up in the previous pageant.

Nolan died in Miami on 20 August 2025, at the age of 87.

== See also ==
- Miss Universe 1962
- List of Argentines

Awards and achievements
Preceded by (West Germany) Marlene Schmidt	Miss Universe; 1962	Succeeded by (Brazil) Iêda Maria Vargas
