= Mutya ng Pilipinas 2017 =

- Date: August 4, 2017
- Presenters: Marc Nelson; Iza Calzado
- Venue: Resorts World Manila, Pasay, Philippines
- Broadcaster: ABS-CBN
- Entrants: 30
- Placements: 12
- Winner: Ilene de Vera; Cebu
- Photogenic: Louise Lian Enumerable; Negros Island

Mutya ng Pilipinas 2017 was the 49th Mutya ng Pilipinas pageant, held at the Newport Performing Arts Theater in Resorts World Manila, Pasay, Metro Manila, Philippines on August 4, 2017.

At the end of the event, Ganiel Krishnan crowned Ilene de Vera as Mutya ng Pilipinas Asia Pacific International 2017. Including her crowned are the new court of winners: Jannie Alipo-on was crowned as Mutya ng Pilipinas Tourism International 2017, Hannah Khayle Iglesia was crowned as Mutya ng Pilipinas Tourism Queen of the Year International 2018, and Savannah Mari Gankiewicz was crowned as Mutya ng Pilipinas Overseas Filipino Communities 2017. Angela Sandigan was named First Runner-Up, while Sofia Sibug was named Second Runner-Up.

== Results ==
=== Placements ===
Color keys

- The contestant Won in an International pageant.
- The contestant was a Runner-up in an International pageant.
- The contestant was a Semi-Finalist in an International pageant.

| Placement | Contestant | International placement |
|---|---|---|
| Mutya ng Pilipinas Asia Pacific International 2017 | Mutya #17 – Ilene Astrid de Vera | 4th Runner-Up – Miss Asia Pacific International 2017 |
| Mutya ng Pilipinas Tourism International 2017 | Mutya #27 – Jannie Loudette Alipo-on | Winner – Miss Tourism International 2017 |
| Mutya ng Pilipinas Tourism Queen of the Year International 2017 | Mutya #14 – Hannah Khayle Iglesia | 1st Runner-Up – AMA Asian International Supermodel 2017 |
| Mutya ng Pilipinas Overseas Filipino Communities 2017 | Mutya #20 – Savannah Mari Gankiewicz | No assigned international pageant |
| 1st Runner-Up | Mutya #21 – Angela Carla Sandigan | Top 30 – Miss Tourism Queen of the Year International 2017 |
| 2nd Runner-Up | Mutya #10 – Sofia Marie Sibug | Top 15 – Miss Global Beauty Queen 2017 |
| Top 12 | Mutya #2 – Chella Grace Falconer; Mutya #3 – Cristelle Ann Tolentino; Mutya #9 – Arianne Deseree Viardo; Mutya #15 – Abigail Jane Grigsby; Mutya #20 – Savannah Mari Gankiewicz; Mutya #23 – Louise Lian Enumerable; Mutya #28 – Suzanne Perez | |

== Special awards ==
| Award | Contestant | Ref. |
|---|---|---|
| Miss Photogenic | Mutya #23 Negros Island - Louise Lian Enumerable | |
| Best in Swimsuit | Mutya #20 Hawaii - Savannah Mari Gankiewicz | |
| Best in Resort Wear | Mutya #27 Navotas - Jannie Loudette Alipo-on | |
| Best in Evening Gown | Mutya #18 Tarlac - Sandrianne Esquilona | |
| People's Choice Award | Mutya #21 Pateros - Angela Carla Sandigan | |
| Camera Club of the Philippines Award | Mutya #27 Navotas - Jannie Loudette Alipo-on | |
| CWC International Award | Mutya #10 Albay - Sofia Marie Sibug | |
| Best Designer Award | Mutya #18 Tarlac - Sandrianne Esquilona (Designer: Rian Fernandez) | |
| Resorts World Manila Award | Mutya #17 Cebu - Ilene Astrid de Vera | |
| Mutya ng Pilipinas-Hannah's | Mutya #27 Navotas - Jannie Loudette Alipo-on | |

== Contestants ==
30 contestants competed for the four titles.

| No. | Contestant | Age | Hometown |
|---|---|---|---|
| 1 | Darlene May Reyes | 24 | Singapore |
| 2 | Chella Grace Falconer | 18 | Northern Mindanao |
| 3 | Cristelle Ann Tolentino | 23 | Manila |
| 4 | Kristine Eiriel Nolasco | 23 | Bulacan |
| 5 | Crystal Rosehelly Alday | 23 | Camarines Sur |
| 6 | Pamela Bianca Villacorte | 23 | Cavite |
| 7 | Jaila Eunice Ragindin | 19 | Bataan |
| 8 | Jesas Wada | 22 | Japan |
| 9 | Arianne Deseree Viardo | 21 | Pampanga |
| 10 | Sofia Marie Sibug | 22 | Albay |
| 11 | Shaina Micaella Bello | 18 | Caloocan |
| 12 | Alyssa Joreen Reyes | 19 | Batangas |
| 13 | Charlene Fontanilla | 20 | Valenzuela |
| 14 | Hannah Khayle Iglesia | 20 | Isabela |
| 15 | Abigail Jane Grigsby | 18 | Melbourne |
| 16 | Nicole Kristel Losloso | 19 | Southern Luzon |
| 17 | Ilene Astrid de Vera | 21 | Cebu |
| 18 | Sandrianne Esquilona | 21 | Tarlac |
| 19 | Claire Yvonne Aznar | 19 | Davao |
| 20 | Savannah Mari Gankiewicz | 21 | Hawaii |
| 21 | Angela Carla Sandigan | 18 | Pateros |
| 22 | Maxine Xanti Manalus | 19 | Central Luzon |
| 23 | Louise Lian Enumerable | 20 | Negros Island |
| 24 | Stephanie Joy Pendon | 19 | Antipolo |
| 25 | Bertmari Ýr Bergmannsdottir | 21 | Iceland |
| 26 | Colleen Chan | 18 | Iloilo |
| 27 | Jannie Loudette Alipo-on | 25 | Navotas |
| 28 | Suzanne Perez | 20 | California |
| 29 | Rica Sey | 21 | Australia |
| 30 | Nicole Marie Deguilmo | 18 | United Kingdom |
