= Miss Universe 1962 =

11th Miss Universe pageant

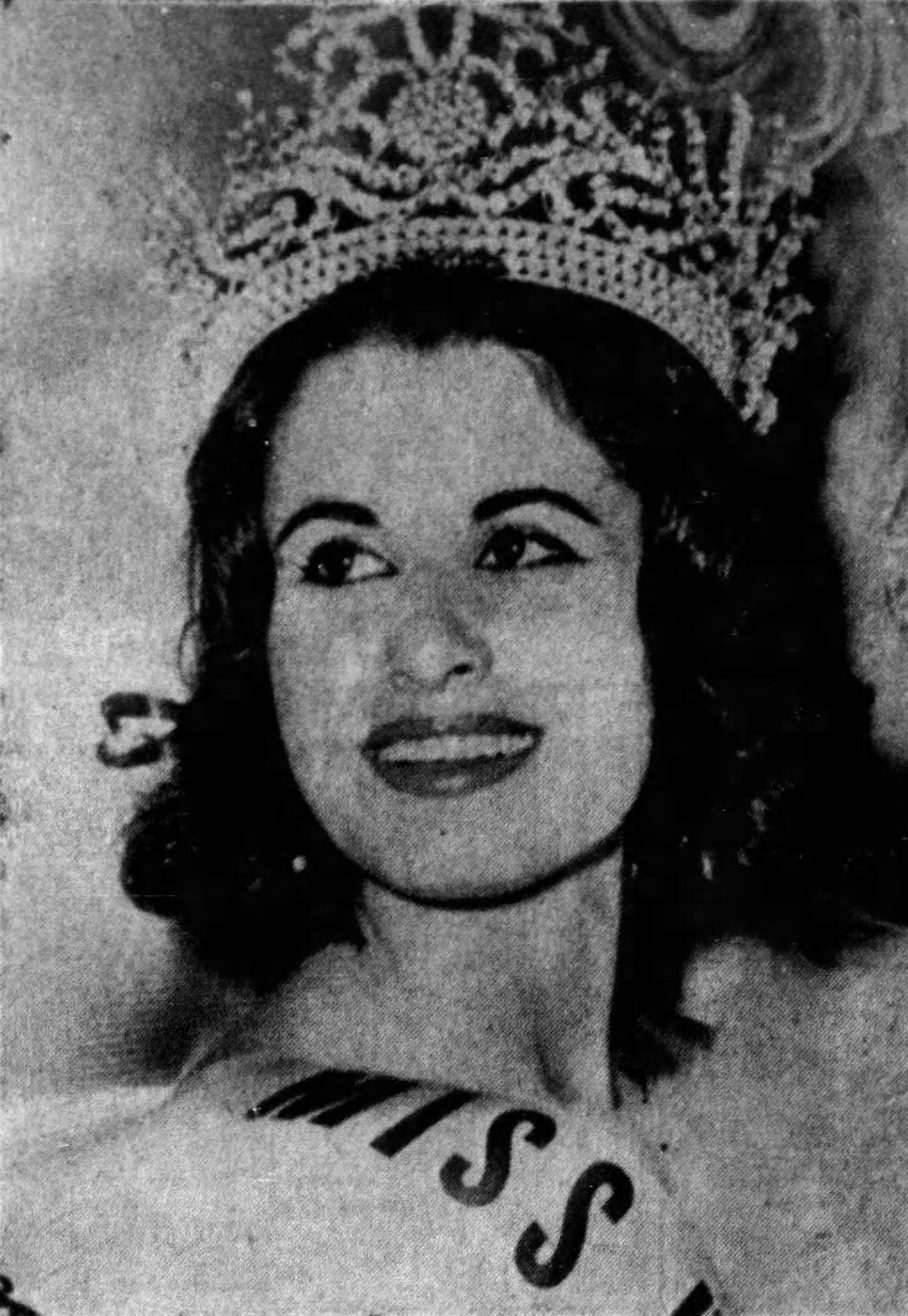
- Norma Nolan
- Date: 14 July 1962
- Presenters: Gene Rayburn
- Venue: Miami Beach Auditorium, Miami Beach, Florida, United States
- Broadcaster: CBS
- Entrants: 52
- Placements: 15
- Debuts: Dahomey; Haiti; Malaya; Tahiti
- Withdrawals: Burma; Chile; Denmark; Guatemala; Jamaica; Madagascar; Rhodesia and Nyasaland
- Returns: Costa Rica; Dominican Republic; Hong Kong; New Zealand; Philippines; Portugal; Singapore
- Winner: Norma Nolan; Argentina
- Congeniality: Sarah Frómeta (Dominican Republic); Hazel Williams (Wales)
- Best National Costume: Kim Carlton (England)
- Photogenic: Kim Carlton (England)

Miss Universe 1962 was the 11th Miss Universe pageant, held at the Miami Beach Auditorium in Miami Beach, Florida, on 14 July 1962.

At the conclusion of the event, Marlene Schmidt of West Germany crowned Norma Nolan of Argentina as Miss Universe 1962. Nolan was the first representative of Argentina to win the contest.

Contestants from fifty-two countries and territories competed in this year's pageant. The pageant was hosted by Gene Rayburn.

== Background ==
=== Selection of participants ===
Contestants from fifty-two countries and territories were selected to compete in the pageant. One candidate was appointed to represent their country, while two candidates were appointed to represent their country/territory to replace the original dethroned winner.

==== Replacements ====
Virginia Bailey, 2nd runner-up of Miss Venezuela 1962, was appointed to represent Venezuela as Miss Venezuela 1962 Olga Antonetti was only 17 and did not meet the age requirement. Kim Carlton was appointed to represent England after Miss England 1962 Suzannah Eaton resigned due to her political views.

==== Debuts, returns, and withdrawals ====
This edition saw the debuts of Dahomey, Haiti, Malaya, and Tahiti, and the returns of the Dominican Republic, which last competed in 1956, the Philippines in 1957, Singapore in 1958, and Costa Rica, Hong Kong, New Zealand, and Portugal last competed in 1960.

Birgitte Heiberg of Denmark and Marlene Murray of Jamaica withdrew for undisclosed reasons. Burma, Chile, Guatemala, Madagascar, and Rhodesia and Nyasaland withdrew after their respective organizations failed to hold a national competition or appoint a delegate. A candidate from Bali was also expected to participate in this edition, but it did not proceed.

== Results ==
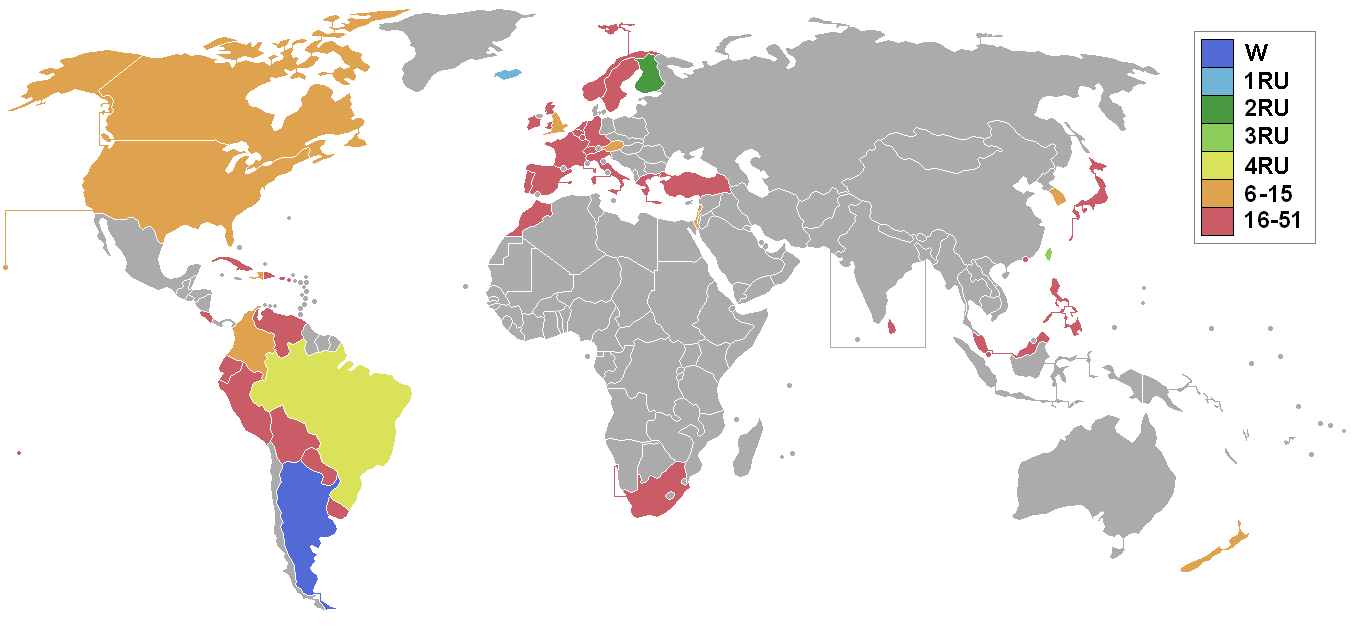
Miss Universe 1962 participating countries and territories

=== Placements ===
Placement	Contestant
Miss Universe 1962	Argentina – Norma Nolan
1st Runner-Up	Iceland – Anna Geirsdóttir
2nd Runner-Up	Finland – Aulikki Järvinen
3rd Runner-Up	Republic of China – Helen Liu
4th Runner-Up	Brazil – Maria Rebouças
Top 15	Austria – Christa Linder; Canada – Marilyn McFatridge; Colombia – Olga Botero; England – Kim Carlton; Haiti – Evelyn Miot; Israel – Yehudit Mazor; Lebanon – Nouhad Cabbabe; New Zealand – Lesley Nichols; South Korea – Bum-joo Seo; United States – Macel Wilson

=== Special awards ===
Award	Contestant
Miss Congeniality	Dominican Republic – Sarah Frómeta; Wales – Hazel Williams
Miss Photogenic	England – Kim Carlton
Best National Costume	England – Kim Carlton

== Pageant ==
=== Format ===
Same with 1955, fifteen semi-finalists were chosen at the preliminary competition that consists of the swimsuit and evening gown competition. Each of the fifteen semi-finalists gave a short speech during the final telecast using their native languages. Afterwards, the fifteen semi-finalists paraded again in their swimsuits and evening gowns, and the five finalists were eventually chosen.

=== Selection committee ===
- Key-young Chang – Founder of the Hankook Ilbo and The Korea Times
- Yoshio Hayakowa – Japanese graphic designer
- Abraham Elias Issa – Jamaica businessman
- Serge Mendjisky – French painter
- Russell Patterson – American cartoonist
- Edilson Cid Varela – Brazilian journalist
- Earl Wilson – American journalist and columnist

== Contestants ==
Fifty-two contestants competed for the title.

Country/Territory	Contestant	Age (Note: Ages at the time of the pageant)	Hometown
Argentina	Norma Nolan	24	Venado Tuerto
Austria	Christa Linder	19	Berchtesgaden
Belgium	Christine Delit	22	Liège
Bolivia	Gabriela Roca	19	Santa Cruz de la Sierra
Brazil	Maria Rebouças	22	Itabuna
Canada	Marilyn McFatridge	19	Preston
Ceylon	Yvonne D'Rozario	18	Colombo
Colombia	Olga Botero	20	Ibagué
Costa Rica	Helvetia Albonico	19	Heredia
Cuba	Aurora Prieto	20	Sancti Spíritus
Dahomey	Gilette Hazoumè	19	Ouémé
Dominican Republic	Sarah Frómeta	18	Santo Domingo
Ecuador	Elaine Ortega	22	Pichincha
England	Kim Carlton	23	London
Finland	Aulikki Järvinen	18	Tampere
France	Sabine Surget	21	Paris
Greece	Kristina Apostolou	18	Athens
Haiti	Evelyn Miot	19	Port-au-Prince
Holland	Marianne van der Heijden	24	Amsterdam
Hong Kong	Shirley Pong	20	Hong Kong
Iceland	Anna Geirsdóttir	19	Reykjavík
Ireland	Josie Dwyer	21	Dublin
Israel	Yehudit Mazor	18	Tel Aviv
Italy	Isa Stoppi	20	Emilia-Romagna
Japan	Kazuko Hirano	19	Kyoto
Lebanon	Nouhad Cabbabe	23	Beirut
Luxembourg	Fernande Kodesch	20	Luxembourg City
Malaya	Sarah Abdullah	21	Kuala Lumpur.
Morocco	Ginette Buenaventes	18	Rabat
New Zealand	Lesley Nichols	19	Christchurch
Norway	Julie Ege	18	Sandnes
Paraguay	Corina Rolón	22	Alto Paraguay
Peru	Silvia Dedeking	20	Lima
Philippines	Josephine Estrada	19	Manila
Portugal	Maria Jose Santos Trindade	19	Lisbon
Puerto Rico	Ana Celia Sosa	24	San Juan
Republic of China	Helen Liu	19	Taipei
Scotland	Vera Parker	21	Ayr
Singapore	Julie Koh	20	Singapore
South Africa	Lynette Gamble	18	Johannesburg
South Korea	Bum-joo Seo	21	Seoul
Spain	Conchita Roig	24	Barcelona
Sweden	Monica Rågby	20	Stockholm
Switzerland	Francine Delouille	20	Ticino
Tahiti	Katy Bauner	23	Papeete
Turkey	Gülay Sezer	19	Istanbul
United States	Macel Wilson	19	Honolulu
United States Virgin Islands	Juanita Monell	22	Christiansted
Uruguay	Nelly Pettersen	23	Montevideo
Venezuela	Virginia Bailey	18	Caracas
Wales	Hazel Williams	22	Cardiff
West Germany	Gisela Karschuck	21	Wiesbaden
