= Miss District of Columbia USA =

Beauty pageant competition

- Formation: 1952
- Type: Beauty pageant
- Headquarters: Washington, D.C.
- Location: District of Columbia
- Members: Miss USA
- Official language: English
- Key people: Emanii Causby (Executive Director)
- Website: Official website

The Miss District of Columbia USA competition is the pageant that selects the representative for the District of Columbia in the Miss USA pageant. Four District of Columbia representatives have won the Miss USA title. Of those two, Deshauna Barber and Kára McCullough won successive Miss USA titles in 2016 and 2017. The most recent placement was Kleo Torres in 2024, placing Top 20.

Two Miss District of Columbia USA titleholders previously held the Miss District of Columbia Teen USA title and four have competed at Miss America, one as Miss New Jersey.

The current titleholder is Kennedy Lucas of Washington, D.C., was crowned Miss District of Columbia USA 2026 on June 20, 2026 at McKinley Tech High School in Washington, D.C.. She will represent the District of Columbia at Miss USA 2026.

== Gallery of titleholders ==
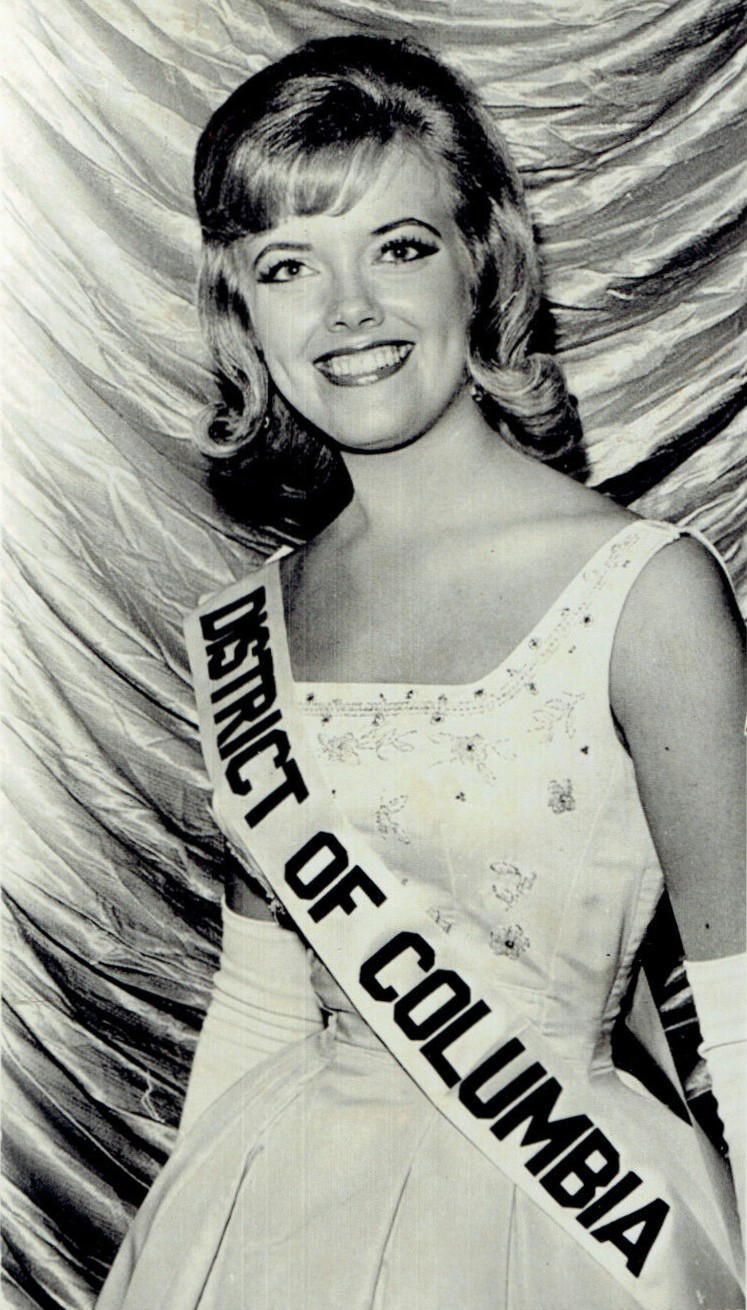
Bobbi Johnson, Miss District of Columbia USA 1964 & Miss USA 1964

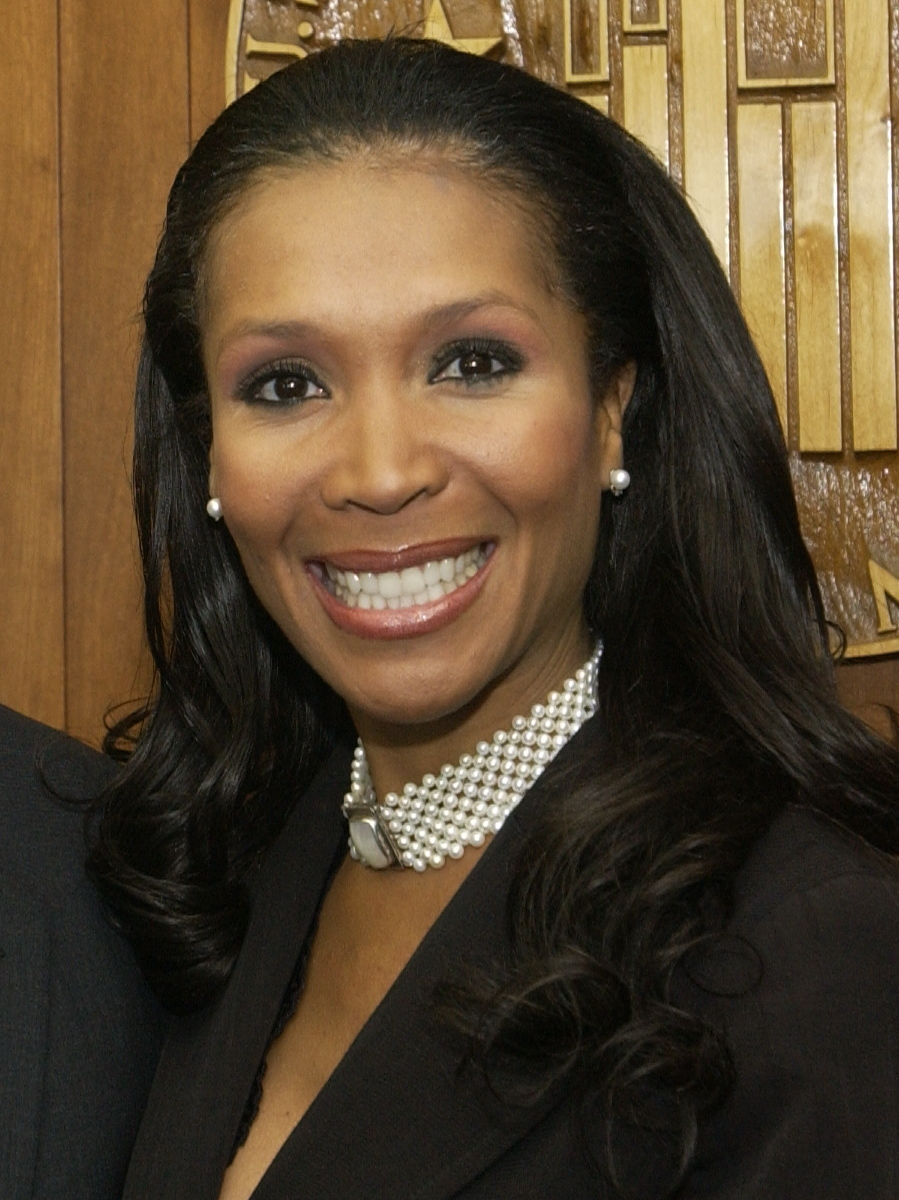
Angela McGlowan, Miss District of Columbia USA 1994

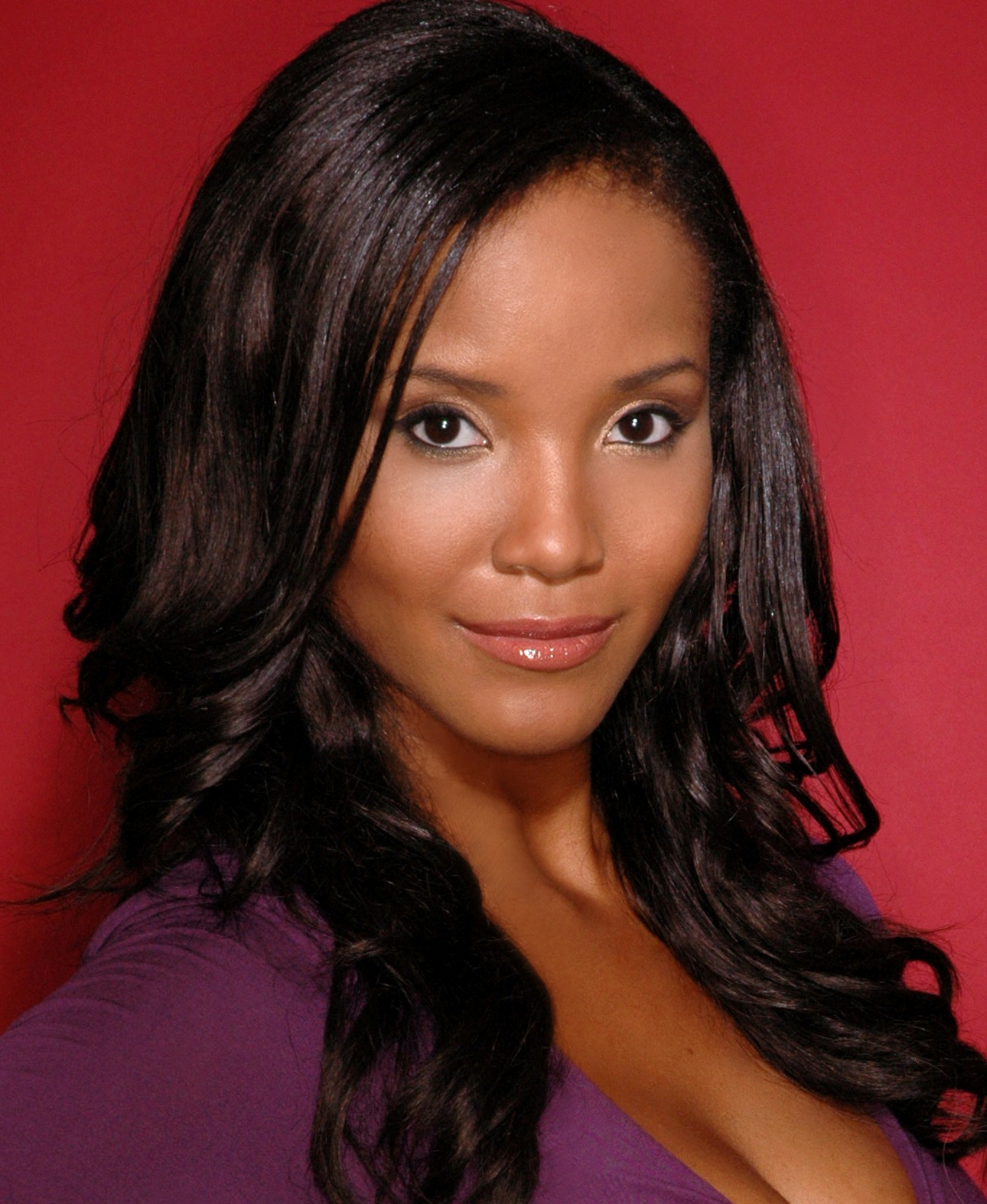
Shauntay Hinton, Miss District of Columbia USA 2002 and Miss USA 2002

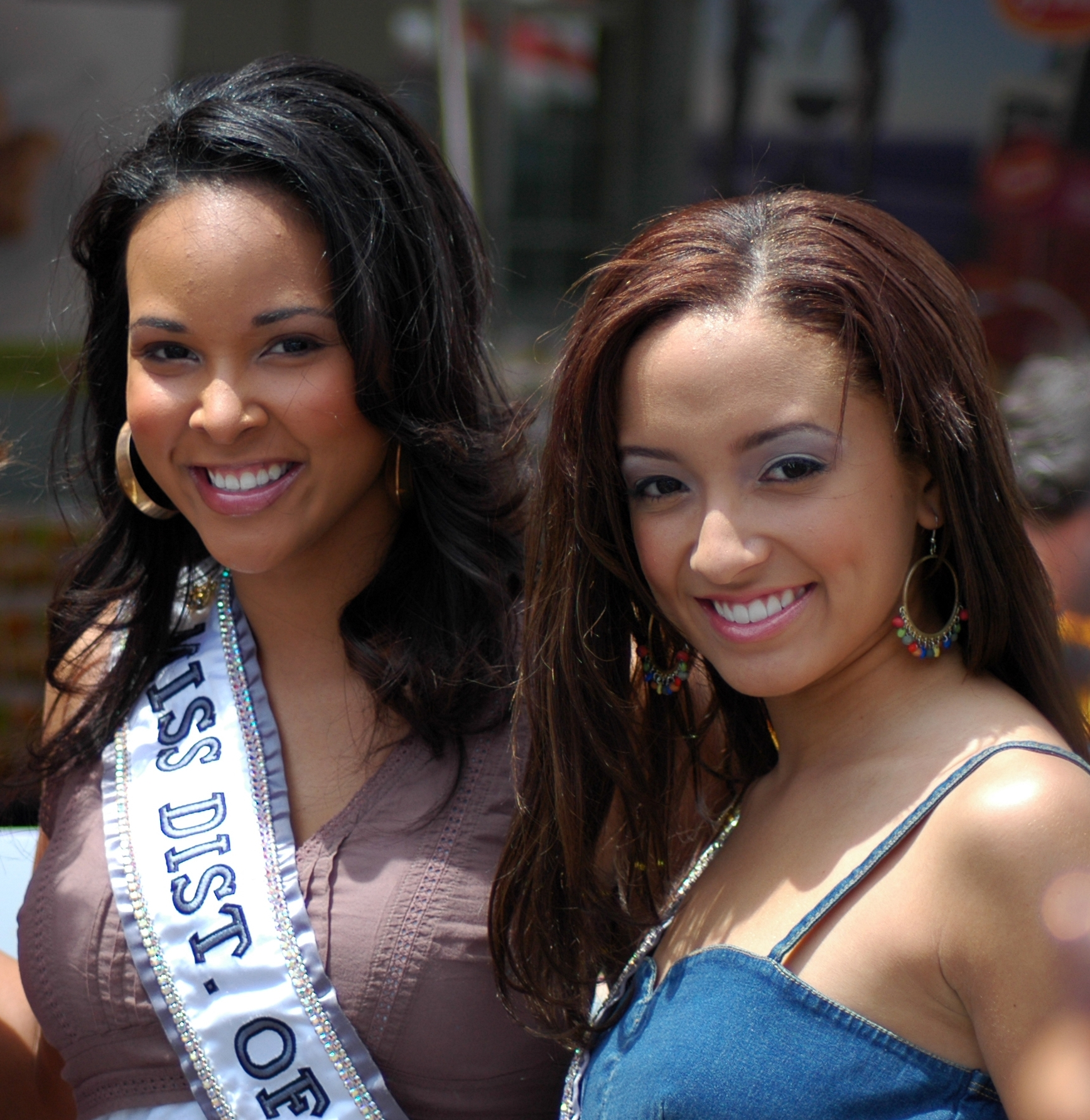
Mercedes Lindsay, Miss District of Columbia USA 2007 and Jasmine Alexis, Miss District of Columbia Teen USA 2007

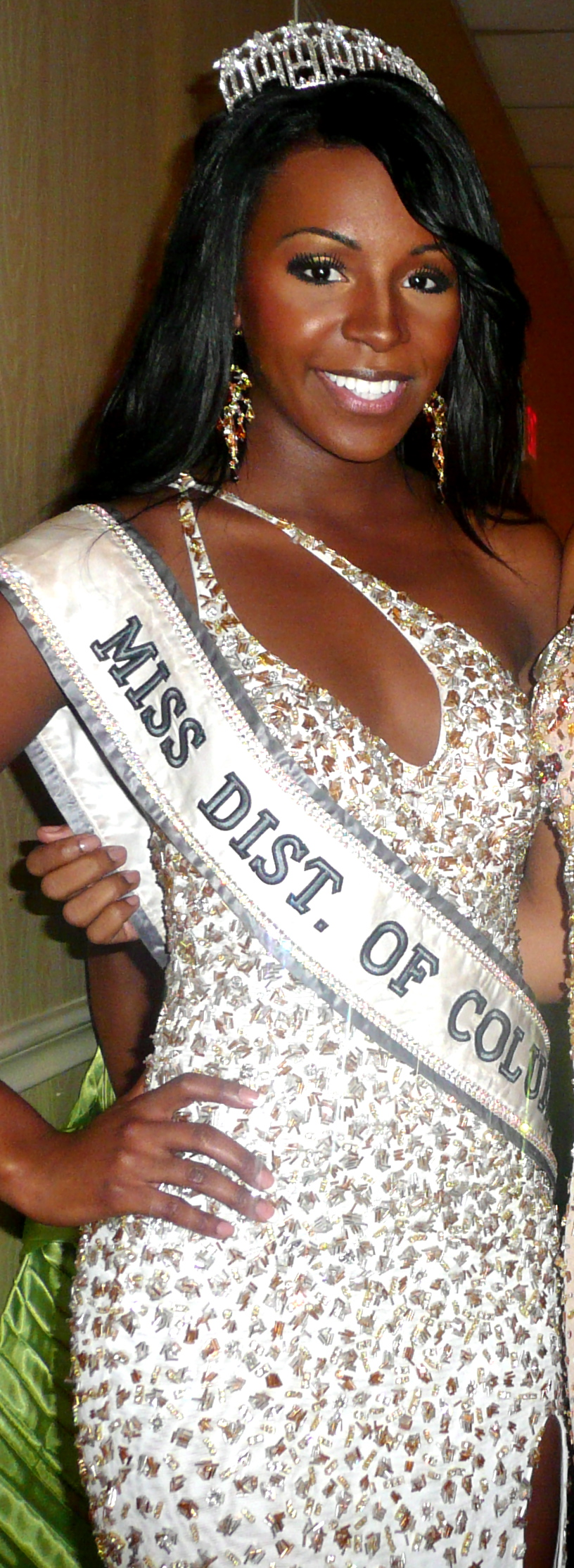
Nicole White, Miss District of Columbia USA 2009

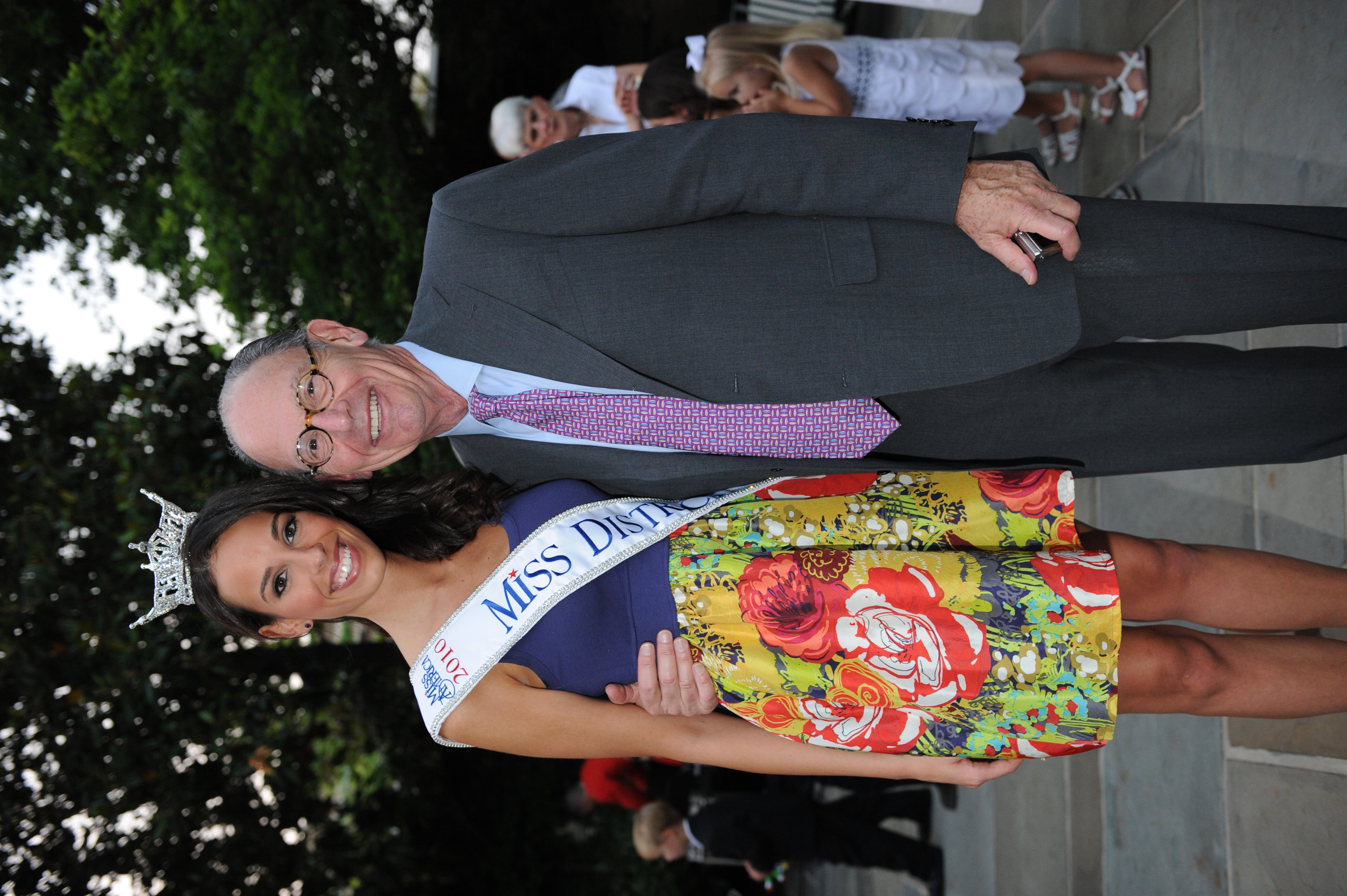
Mackenzie Green, Miss District of Columbia USA 2010

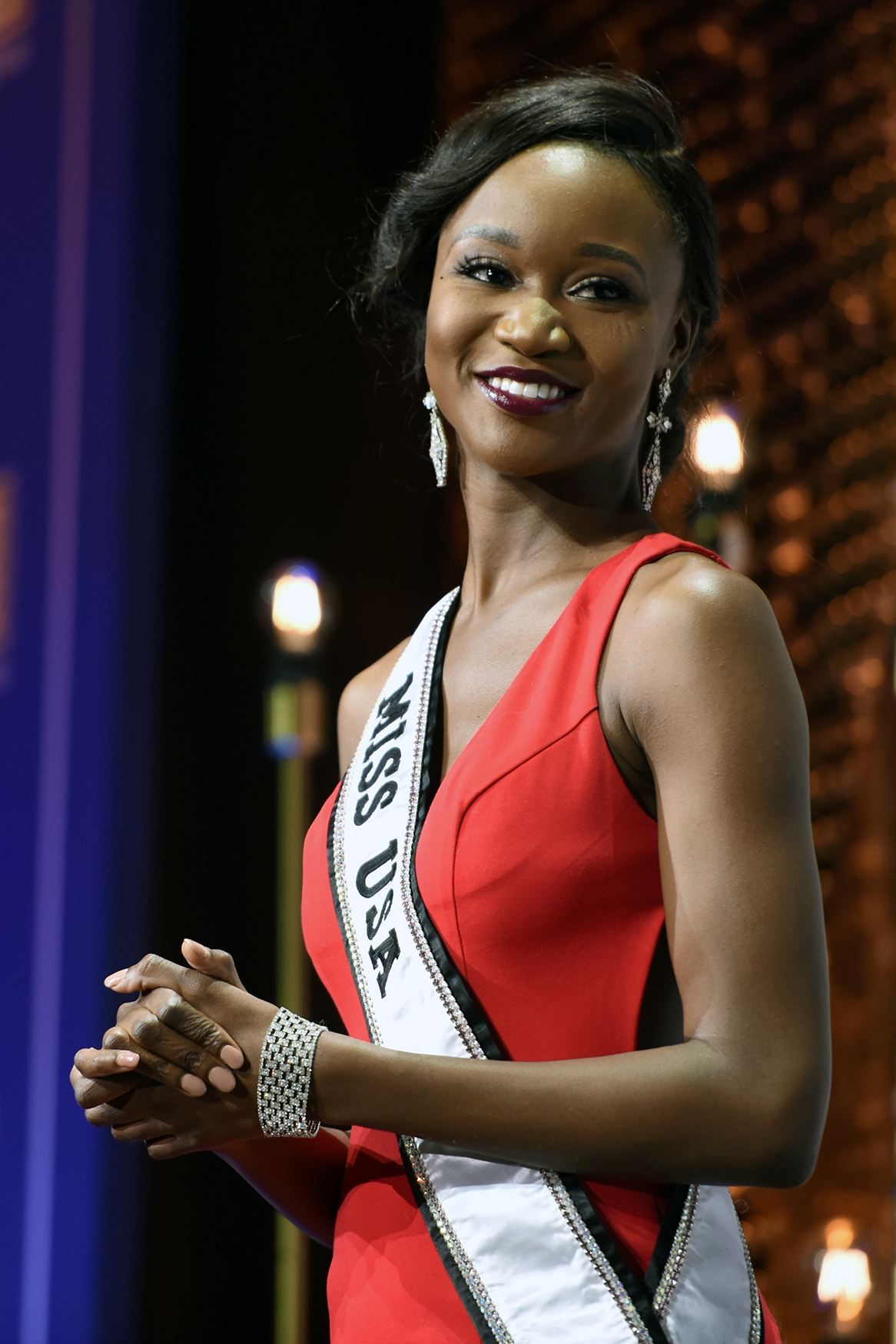
Deshauna Barber, Miss District of Columbia USA 2016 & Miss USA 2016

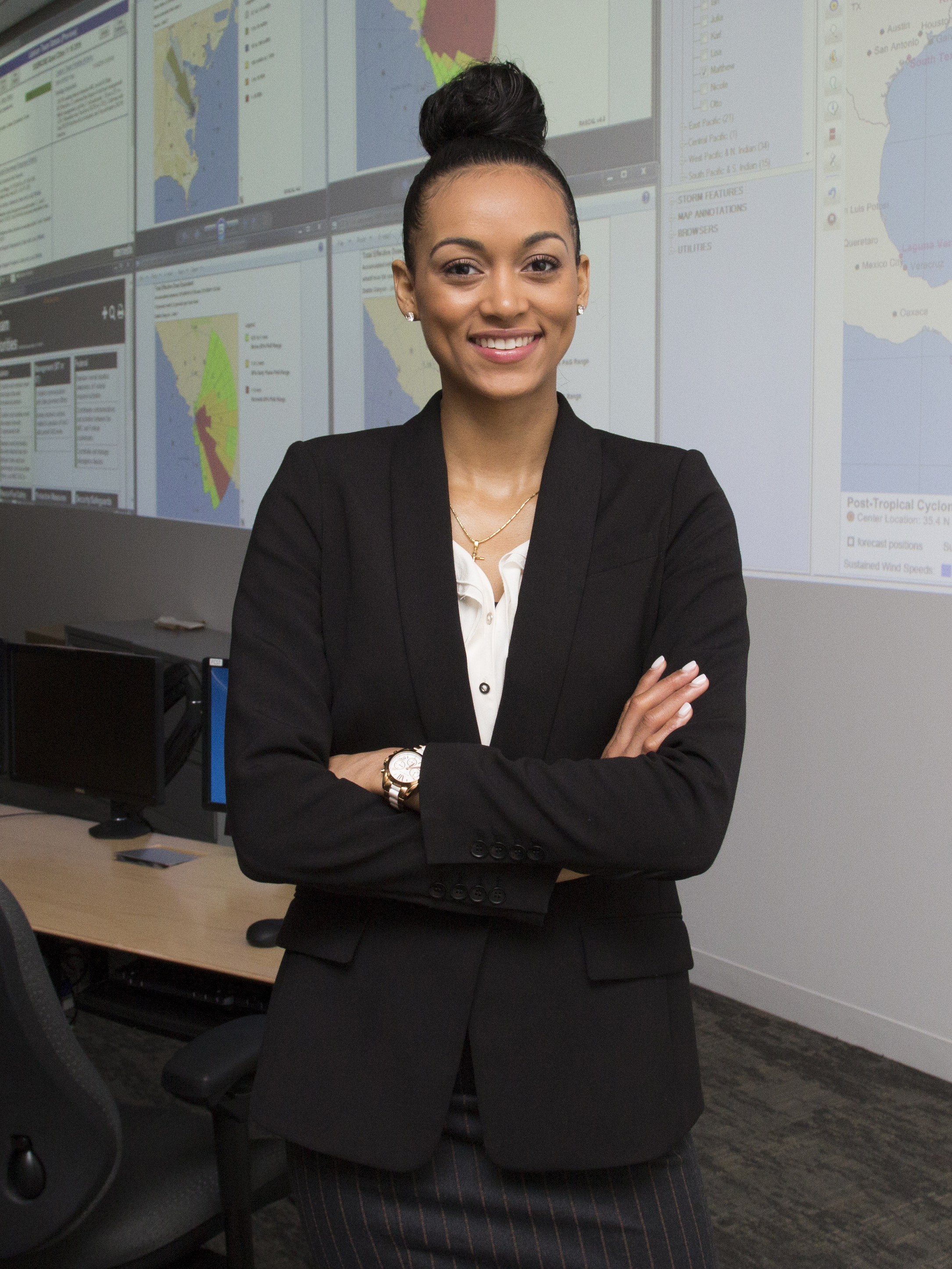
Kára McCullough, Miss District of Columbia USA 2017 & Miss USA 2017

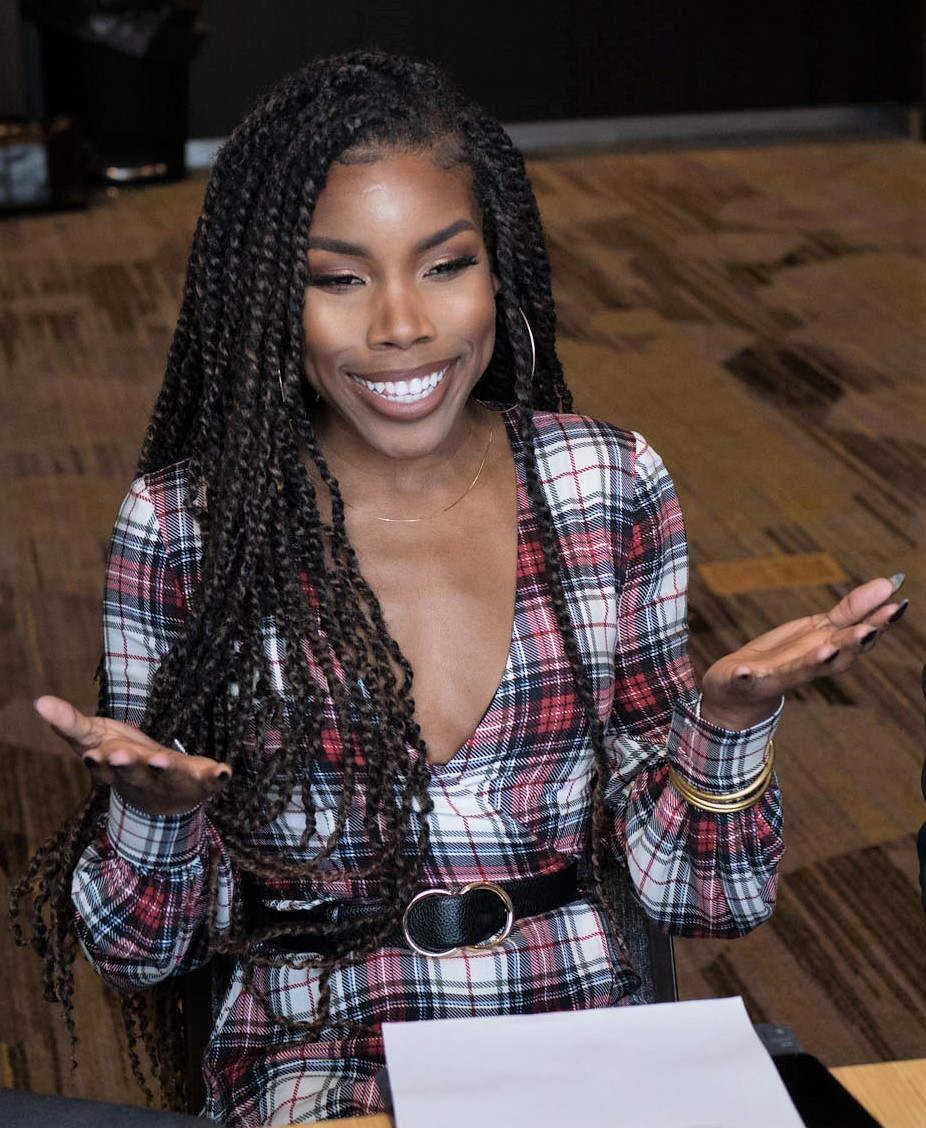
Ryann Richardson, replacement Miss District of Columbia USA 2017

== Results summary ==
=== Placements ===
- Miss USAs: Bobbie Johnson (1964), Shauntay Hinton (2002), Deshauna Barber (2016), Kára McCullough (2017)
- 1st runners-up: Michele Metrinko (1963), Liane Angus (2001)
- 4th runners-up: Diana Batts (1965), Steffanee Leaming (1984)
- Top 10/12: Nikki Phillipp (1970), Susan Pluskoski (1971), Janet Gail Greenawalt (1972), Nancy Plachta (1973), Robin Utterback (1974), Mary Lamond (1975), Sharon Sutherland (1977), Catherine Staples (1990), Candace Allen (2006), Cordelia Cranshaw (2019)
- Top 15/16/20: Laura Farley (1954), Helen Sweeney (1962), Myra Chudy (1967), Sue Counts (1966), Cierra Jackson (2020), Faith Porter (2022), Cassie Baloue (2023), Kleo Torres (2024)
- District of Columbia holds a record of 26 placements at Miss USA.

=== Awards ===
- Miss Congeniality: Elva Anderson (1988), Napiera Groves (1997)

== Winners ==
Color key

- Declared as Winner
- Ended as runner-up
- Ended as one of the finalists or semifinalists

Year	Name	Hometown	Age (Note: Age at the time of the Miss USA pageant)	Local title	Placement	Special awards	Notes
2026	Kennedy JoAnn Lucas	Washington, D.C.	28				
2025	Allison LaForce	Washington, D.C.	26				Previously Miss Maryland’s Outstanding Teen 2016; Contestant on Squid Game: The Challenge
2024	Kleo Torres	Washington, D.C.	26	Miss Nation's Capital	Top 20		
2023	Cassie Alexa Baloue	Washington, D.C.	25	Miss Freedom	Top 20		
2022	Faith Maria Porter	Washington, D.C.	23	Miss Brookland	Top 16		Previously Miss Earth USA Air 2022
2021	Sasha Perea	Washington, D.C.	27	Miss City Center			Previously Miss Virginia World 2016 & 2017; 2nd runner-up at Miss World America 2016; Top 16 at Miss World America 2017
2020	Cierra Dena'e Jackson	Washington, D.C.	27	Miss Capital City	Top 16		Previously Miss District of Columbia 2016
2019	Cordelia Dee Cranshaw	Washington, D.C.	26		Top 10		
2018	Bryce Ariel Armstrong	Washington, D.C.	21				
2017	Ryann Richardson	Washington, D.C.	27		did not compete		Originally first runner-up, assumed the title when Kára McCullough won Miss USA; Went on to become Miss Black America 2018
2017	Kára Deidra McCullough	Washington, D.C.	25		Miss USA 2017		Born in Italy; Top 10 at Miss Universe 2017
2016	Jasmine Jones	Washington, D.C.	27		did not compete		Originally placed in the semifinals after first runner-up Kára McCullough declined to take the title (when she was preparing for the following year's state pageant), assumed the title when Deshauna Barber won Miss USA
2016	Deshauna Barber	Washington, D.C.	26		Miss USA 2016		First active-duty soldier at the time of crowning; Member of the United States Armed Forces; Top 9 at Miss Universe 2016
2015	Elizabeth Lynn "Lizzy" Olsen	Washington, D.C.	25				
2014	Ciera Nicole Butts	Washington, D.C.	23				Previously Miss Maryland United States 2013; Winner of Oxygen's reality series Last Squad Standing
2013	Jessica Frith	Washington, D.C.	26				
2012	Monique Thompkins	Washington, D.C.	23				Washington Redskins Cheerleader
2011	Heather Swann	Washington, D.C.	22				
2010	MacKenzie Green	Washington, D.C.	21				
2009	Nicole White	Washington, D.C.	20				Previously Miss District of Columbia Teen USA 2004
2008	Chelsey Rodgers	Washington, D.C.	25				Executive director of Miss District of Columbia USA pageants
2007	Mercedes Lindsay	Washington, D.C.	26				
2006	Candace Allen	Washington, D.C.	22		Top 10		
2005	Sarah-Elizabeth Langford	Washington, D.C.	25				Previously Miss District of Columbia 2002; contestant and winner on Fear Factor in 2005 Miss USA episode #5.29
2004	Tiara Dews	Washington, D.C.	21				Previously Miss District of Columbia Teen USA 2000, top 10 at Miss Teen USA 2000
2003	Michelle Dollie Wright	Washington, D.C.	26				Previously Miss District of Columbia Teen USA 1995
2002	Diahann Adair Doyen	Washington, D.C.	23		did not compete		Originally first runner-up; succeeded the title when Shauntay Hinton won Miss USA
2002	Shauntay Hinton	Washington, D.C.	23		Miss USA 2002		Non-semi-finalist at Miss Universe 2002
2001	Liane C. Angus	Washington, D.C.	24		1st runner-up		
2000	Juel April Casamayor	Washington, D.C.	26				Washington Redskins Cheerleader
1999	Amy Alderson	Washington, D.C.	27				Sister of Miss Tennessee Teen USA 1994, top 6 at Miss Teen USA 1994 and Miss Tennessee USA 2002, Allison Alderson
1998	Zanice Lyles	Washington, D.C.	24				
1997	Napiera Groves	Washington, D.C.	21			Miss Congeniality	
1996	La Chanda Jenkins	Washington, D.C.	19				
1995	Marci Andrews	Washington, D.C.	27				
1994	Angela McGlowan	Washington, D.C.	25				
1993	Alena Neves	Washington, D.C.	18				
1992	Wanda Jones	Washington, D.C.	20				
1991	Lakecia Smith	Washington, D.C.	27				
1990	Catherine Staples	Washington, D.C.	23		Top 12		
1989	Somaly Susan Sieng	Washington, D.C.	24				
1988	Elva Anderson	Washington, D.C.	27			Miss Congeniality	
1987	Edwina Richard	Washington, D.C.	18				
1986	Desiree Keating	Washington, D.C.					Previously Miss District of Columbia 1984
1985	Christal Chacon	Washington, D.C.	18				
1984	Steffanee Leaming	Washington, D.C.	21		4th runner-up		
1983	Julie Anne Warner	Washington, D.C.					
1982	Lori Esteep	Washington, D.C.					
1981	Belinda Johnson	Washington, D.C.					
1980	Marianne Ritter	Washington, D.C.	18				
1979	Cynthia Ramsay	Washington, D.C.	19				
1978	Wanda Clineman	Oxon Hill, MD	22				
1977	Sharon Sutherland	Washington, D.C.	25		Top 12		
1976	Nancy Stitt	Washington, D.C.	20				Nancy Sitt competed at Miss USA, but Mary Theresa Clair is listed as Miss DC USA 1976 on the Miss DC USA website.
1975	Mary C. Lamond	Washington, D.C.	27		Top 12		
1974	Robin Lee Utterback	Washington, D.C.	22		Top 12		
1973	Nancy Plachta	Washington, D.C.	22		Top 12		
1972	Janet Gail Greenawalt	Washington, D.C.	18		Top 12		
1971	Sue Lowden	Washington, D.C.	19		Top 12		Later Miss New Jersey 1973 as Suzanne Plummer; 2nd Runner-up to Miss America 1974
1970	Nikki Phillipp	Washington, D.C.	27		Top 15		
1969	Shelley Gosman	Washington, D.C.					
1968	Diane Mothershead	Washington, D.C.	23				Previously semi-finalist at Miss World USA 1967
1967	Myra Chudy	Washington, D.C.	26		Top 15		
1966	Sue Counts	Washington, D.C.	19		Top 15		
1965	Dianna Lynn Batts	Washington, D.C.			4th runner-up		Model on The Price Is Right, later Miss USA World 1965 and 1st runner up in Miss World 1965
1964	Bobbi Johnson	Washington, D.C.	19		Miss USA 1964		Top 15 at Miss Universe 1964
1963	Michele Bettina Metrinko	Washington, D.C.			1st runner-up		Later won the Miss New York City World 1963 and Miss USA World 1963 pageants, and placed as a top 14 semi-finalist at Miss World 1963.; Her sister Marsha Metrinko also competed at Miss USA 1963 as Miss Maryland and in Miss America 1963 as Miss New York City. Candidate for the Republican nomination in the 2010 U.S. House of Rep. election in Delaware for Delaware's at-large congressional district under her married name Michele Rollins.
1962	Helen Sweeney	Washington, D.C.	27		Top 16		
1961	Patricia Brunette						
1960	Doris Lee Jones						
1959	Shirley Ann Hobbs	Washington, D.C.	20				
1958	Betty Sue Robertson	Washington, D.C.	22				
1958	Margaret "Peggy" Wolf	Washington, D.C.	19		did not compete		Second runner-up at Miss District of Columbia 1958
1957	did not compete						
1956	Joanne Holler	Washington, D.C.	21				First runner-up at Miss District of Columbia USA 1954
1955	did not compete						
1954	Laura Farley	Washington, D.C.	24		Top 19		
1953	did not compete						
1952	did not compete						
