= Kára McCullough =

Winner of Miss USA 2017 (born 1991)

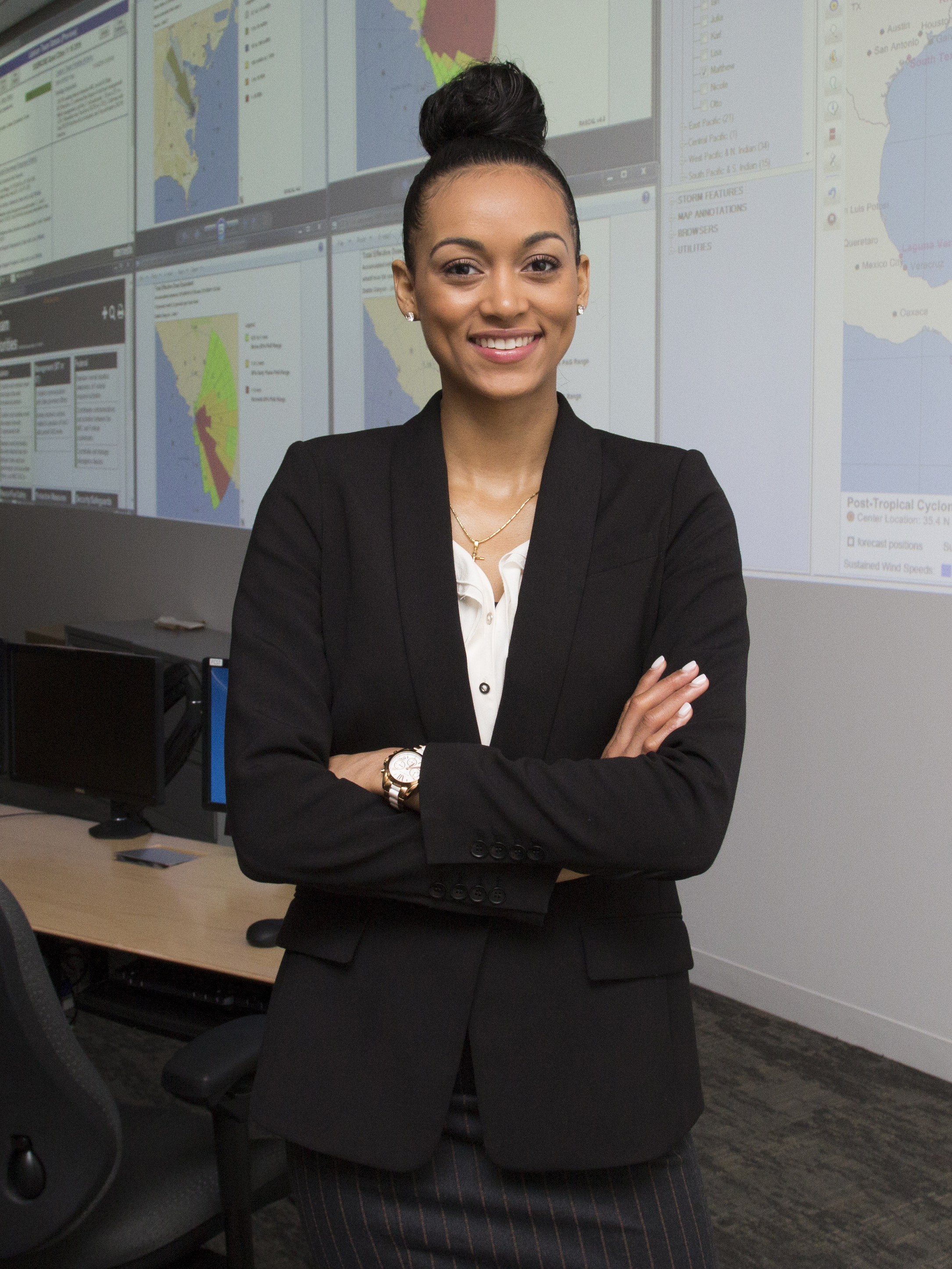
- McCullough in 2017
- Born: Kára Deidra McCullough; Naples, Italy
- Education: South Carolina State University (BS)
- Spouse: Garrett Temple (m. 2020)
- Children: 1
- Beauty pageant titleholder
- Title: Miss District of Columbia USA 2017; Miss USA 2017
- Major competitions: Miss District of Columbia USA 2015; (1st Runner-Up); Miss District of Columbia USA 2016; (1st Runner-Up); Miss District of Columbia USA 2017; (Winner); Miss USA 2017; (Winner); Miss Universe 2017; (Top 10)

Kára McCullough Temple (/ˈkaɪrə/; née McCullough) is an American beauty pageant titleholder who was crowned Miss USA 2017. As Miss USA, McCullough represented the United States at Miss Universe 2017, where she placed in the Top 10.

Previously, McCullough had been crowned Miss District of Columbia USA 2017, becoming the fourth woman from the District of Columbia to be crowned Miss USA. Additionally, McCullough and her predecessor Deshauna Barber's wins marked the first time a state had won back-to-back titles since Courtney Gibbs and Gretchen Polhemus of Texas won Miss USA 1988 and 1989.

== Early life and education ==
McCullough was born in Naples, Italy to Betty Ann Parker and Artensel E. McCullough Sr. Her mother was a member of the United States Navy for 23 years, and McCullough thus lived in various places such as Sicily, South Korea, Japan, and Hawaii. She was later raised and completed high school in Virginia Beach, Virginia. McCullough attended the HBCU South Carolina State University, where she graduated with a Bachelor of Science degree in chemistry with a concentration in radiochemistry and served as the school's 75th Miss South Carolina State University. While a student, she was a member of the American Chemical Society, the Health Physics Society, and the American Nuclear Society. She has been inducted into the Golden Key International Honour Society and the National Society of Black Engineers.

Prior to becoming Miss USA, McCullough worked as an emergency preparedness specialist in the Nuclear Regulatory Commission's Office of Nuclear Security and Incident Response.

== Pageantry ==
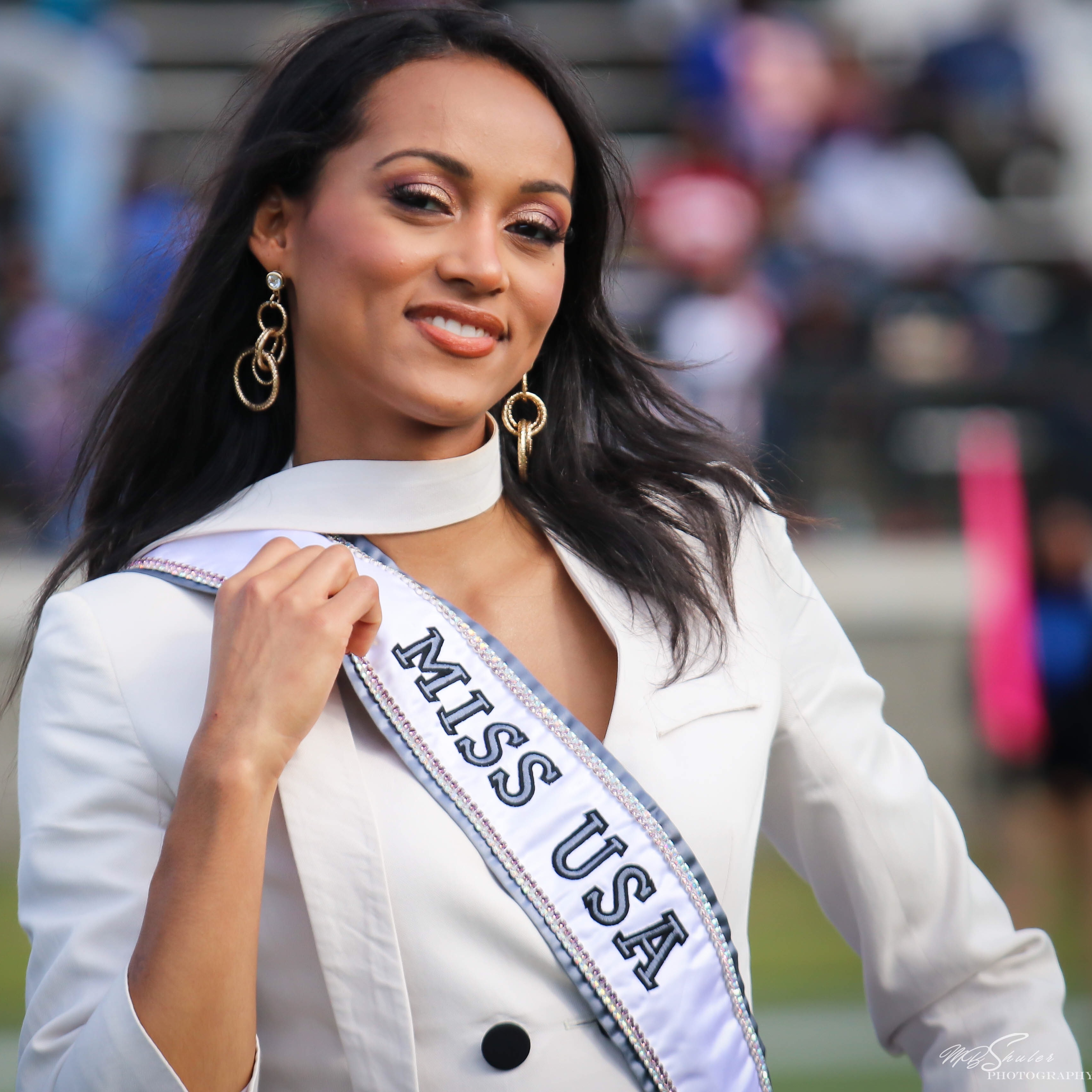
Miss USA Kara McCullough in 2017

Prior to winning Miss District of Columbia USA 2017, she was the first runner-up for Miss District of Columbia USA twice, in 2015 and 2016, respectively, to Lizzy Olsen and Deshauna Barber. In 2017, she was crowned Miss District of Columbia USA 2017 by Miss USA 2016 Barber. On May 14, 2017, McCullough competed in the Miss USA 2017 pageant in Las Vegas. She went on to win the competition, beating out first runner-up Chhavi Verg of New Jersey and second runner-up Meridith Gould of Minnesota. During her time at Miss USA, McCullough received media attention and praise for deciding to compete with her natural hair, which was seen as support for the natural hair movement. McCullough was both criticized and praised for her conservative question answers, stating that health care was a privilege for the working and not a right, in addition to calling herself an "equalist" as opposed to a feminist. She is the seventh Miss USA titleholder born outside the United States.

As Miss USA, McCullough represented the United States at Miss Universe 2017 on November 26, 2017, in Las Vegas. Her national costume was an atom, representing women in science. McCullough reached the top ten of the competition before being eliminated. The winner of the competition was Demi-Leigh Nel-Peters of South Africa.

On May 21, 2018, McCullough crowned Sarah Rose Summers as her successor at the Miss USA 2018 competition, held in Shreveport, Louisiana.

== Personal life ==
In 2020, McCullough married professional basketball player Garrett Temple, in a private ceremony. They have three children. Temple's father-in-law is Collis Temple, a former professional basketball player.

Awards and achievements
Preceded by Jasmine Jones	Miss District of Columbia USA; 2017	Succeeded by Ryann Richardson
Preceded by Deshauna Barber, District of Columbia	Miss USA; 2017	Succeeded by Sarah Rose Summers, Nebraska
