= Ryann Richardson =

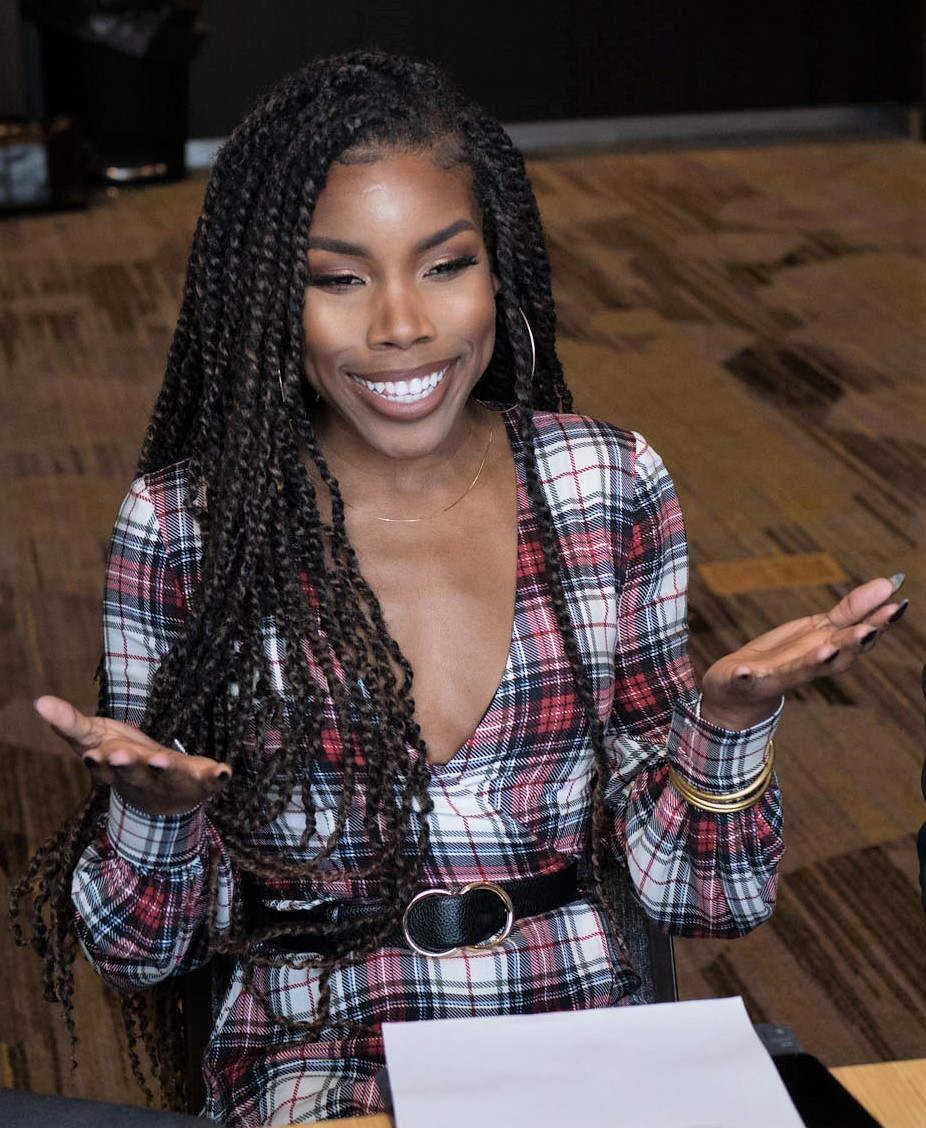
- Richardson at a virtual town-hall for the Pete Buttigieg 2020 presidential campaign
- Born: Washington, DC
- Education: Philadelphia University
- Occupation: Founder of Ellington Lafayette Co.
- Known for: Miss Black America 2018
- Website: http://www.ryannrichardson.com/

Ryann Richardson is an American political activist, tech entrepreneur and beauty pageant titleholder who is the 50th Anniversary Miss Black America 2018. She spent 10 years in the tech industry, and held leadership roles at Uber and Victor. She co-founded ExecThread, a networking platform for executives, and founded Ellington Lafayette Co., a tech incubator with a focus on supporting "women, people of color, and other marginalized communities."

== Early life and politics ==
Richardson was interested in politics from a young age, describing herself as "a weird nine-year-old watching impeachment proceedings on TV." However, she says it wasn't until college that she really began to experience and understand how systemic inequality affects women of color. She worked in the tech industry as a marketer for 10 years and was the youngest honoree on Savoy Magazine's list of Most Influential Black Executives in Corporate America.

She actively supported Pete Buttigieg in the 2020 Democratic Party presidential primaries and was a national surrogate for his campaign, speaking on his policy as it related to the lives of people of color.

== Tech industry and activism ==
Early in her career, Richardson worked on brand expansion for T-Mobile and launched the MetroPCS brand in its Mid-Atlantic markets. Later, she was a regional manager at Uber, leading East Coast marketing and strategic partnerships. There, she was a founding member of the company's employee-led Diversity & Inclusion Taskforce. Richardson is also credited with building Uber's on-site activation lounge at the 2016 Democratic National Convention in Philadelphia.

Richardson began traveling the US speaking on issues of social equity, representation, and culture and gave a TED Talk in 2019. Her speaking focuses on messages for women and minorities in spaces, like the tech industry, where they are underrepresented. In 2020, she founded the TAKE UP SPACE MVMT social impact campaign and content platform for marginalized people.

== Pageantry ==
As a teen, Richardson was drawn to pageantry as a means of earning college scholarships and ultimately funded much of her university education through pageants. In 2009, as a sophomore at Philadelphia University, she won the Miss Philadelphia title and a $10,000 scholarship.

Later, she succeeded Kara McCullough, who became Miss USA, as Miss District of Columbia USA 2017 and spent her term advocating for women and minorities in the District. In 2018, at age 28, Richardson won the 50th Anniversary Miss Black America pageant in Kansas City, MO after taking first-place honors in the competition's swimsuit and projection (interview) phases.

Awards and achievements
Preceded by Kára McCullough	Miss District of Columbia USA; 2017 (assumed)	Succeeded by Bryce Armstrong
