= Angela McGlowan =

American political commentator and author (born 1970)

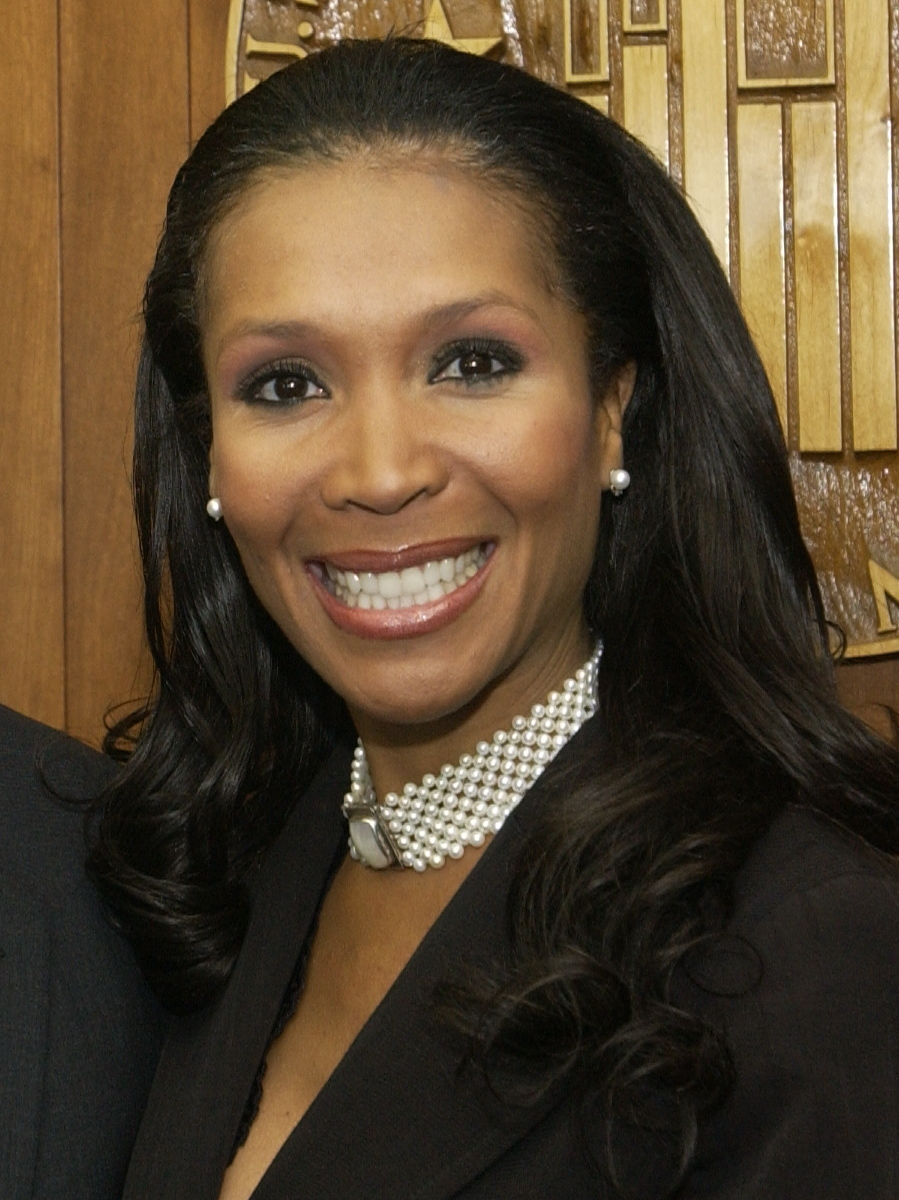
- McGlowan in 2006
- Born: March 2, 1970 (age 56); Oxford, Mississippi, U.S.
- Education: University of Mississippi (BA)
- Occupations: Fox News political analyst, author
- Political party: Republican
- Spouses: John Venners (2006–16); Jack Keane

Angela McGlowan (born March 2, 1970) is an American Republican political commentator, best-selling author, and businesswoman. She is a contributor on Fox News, covering politics, special interest groups, and lobbies.

McGlowan was 1994 Miss District of Columbia USA. She is the author of the 2007 book Bamboozled: How Americans Are Being Exploited by the Lies of the Liberal Agenda. In 2010, she placed third in the Republican primary for a Congressional seat in Mississippi.

== Early life and education ==
McGlowan was born and raised in Oxford, Mississippi. Her mother, Alberta, born in Hernando, Mississippi, failed sixth grade because she had to pick cotton, and had to work four jobs to support five children. Her father, James Thomas McGlowan, was a professor, a United Methodist minister, a civil rights worker, and a community activist who was also the first principal from 1958 to 1960 of Hernando Central (now called Oak Grove Central Elementary School), a building for African-American students from grades 1-12 during segregation; he died of cancer in 1982 when she was 12 years old.

She attended Lafayette High School in Oxford. McGlowan then attended the University of Mississippi, where she earned a B.A. in public administration with an emphasis on criminal justice and political science in 1993. While attending the university, she was a member of the school's dance team, the Rebelettes. She was Miss Magnolia in 1993. McGlowan was 1994 Miss District of Columbia USA. McGlowan has a mixed ethnic background which includes African American, Native American, Scottish, and Irish ancestry.

== Career ==
=== Early years ===
McGlowan began her government affairs expertise by serving as government and public affairs manager for Steve Wynn's, Mirage Resorts. During her tenure, she participated in lobbying initiatives with the American Gaming Association (AGA) that laid the foundation for Mirage Resorts latest gaming properties, Bellagio in Las Vegas, Nevada, and the Beau Rivage in Biloxi, Mississippi. She also developed Mirage Resorts advocacy and community outreach programs for both Las Vegas and Biloxi.

McGlowan served as Director of Outreach for the Better America Foundation, an organization founded by Senator Bob Dole that was focused on promoting community empowerment. She served as legislative/press aide to both Representative Roscoe Bartlett (R-6th Dist. Maryland), and Representative John Ensign (R-1st Dist. Nevada), working on issues of diversity, welfare reform, tax policy, and healthcare. She also served as publicist to Ensign's successful re-election campaign in 1996.

From 1999 to 2005, McGlowan served as director of Government Affairs and Diversity Development for Chairman Rupert Murdoch's News Corporation. She was responsible for the development and implementation of diversity initiatives within the Fox Entertainment Group and its owned and operated interests. She was also a lobbyist and advocate within News Corporation to Congress for federal, legislative, and regulatory policies supportive of corporate objectives.

=== 2005-present ===
In 2005, McGlowan founded her own political consultancy, Political Strategies & Insights. It is a government affairs, political strategy, public relations, and advocacy consulting firm based in Oxford, Mississippi, and Washington, D.C.

That year, McGlowan also became the host of Good Day Street Talk, a New York City public affairs program. She also began appearing as a right-wing speaker on PBS's news analysis program To the Contrary, BET's Tonight, and ABC's political talk show Politically Incorrect. She received the 2005 Harlem Chamber of Commerce New York City Journalist of the Year Award.

McGlowan's book, Bamboozled: How Americans Are Being Exploited by the Lies of the Liberal Agenda, placed eighth on the Washington Area Bestseller List of the Washington Post for the week of Sunday, April 22, 2007.

In February 2010, McGlowan announced her candidacy for Congress in Mississippi's 1st congressional district to challenge incumbent Democrat Travis Childers. She was one of 32 Black Republicans campaigning for Congress, the largest number since the Reconstruction era. Had she been elected, she would have become only the third African American elected as a Republican to the House of Representatives in 75 years. Her political positions included her view that the country needed immigration enforcement of existing laws rather than new immigration laws, a focus on better funding education, and a move towards bipartisanship. She also wanted to balance the national budget, implement tax cuts for small businesses, and create jobs in north Mississippi. She subsequently lost the Republican primary after coming in third place, garnering 15% of the vote. She was the first black candidate as well as the first woman to run in Mississippi's 1st congressional district, and left the race stating: "We lost the battle but won the war. A milestone was achieved for others to follow."

She subsequently returned to Fox News in June 2010. McGlowan currently serves as a political and business analyst and contributor for both Fox News and Fox Business Network, covering politics, special interest groups, and lobbies.

== Personal life ==
McGlowan is married to four-star General Jack Keane, recipient of the Presidential Medal of Freedom.
