= Miss USA 2017 =

66th Miss USA pageant

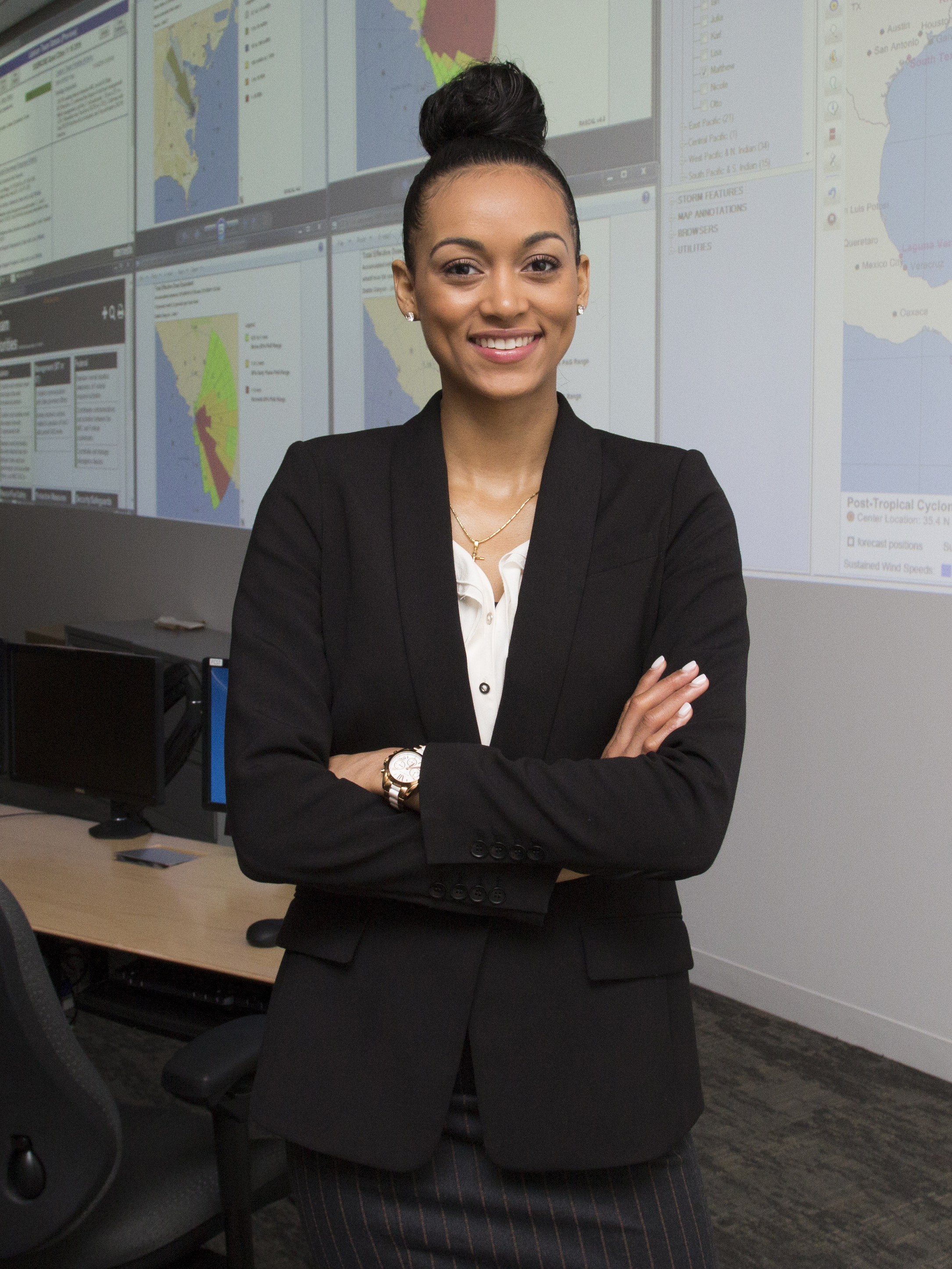
- Kára McCullough, Miss USA 2017
- Date: May 14, 2017
- Presenters: Terrence J; Julianne Hough; Ashley Graham
- Entertainment: Brett Eldredge; Pitbull; Cirque du Soleil (Michael Jackson: One)
- Venue: Mandalay Bay Events Center, Paradise, Nevada
- Broadcaster: Fox (KVVU-TV); Azteca (KHDF-CD)
- Entrants: 51
- Placements: 10
- Withdrawals: Miss 52 USA
- Winner: Kára McCullough; District of Columbia
- Congeniality: Bayleigh Dayton (Missouri) and Mikaela Shaw (Wyoming)

Miss USA 2017 was the 66th edition of the Miss USA pageant, held at the Mandalay Bay Events Center in Paradise, Nevada, on May 14, 2017.

Deshauna Barber of the District of Columbia crowned her successor Kára McCullough, also of the District of Columbia, at the end of the event. This was District of Columbia's fourth Miss USA title, and also this was the first time since 2008 to have a second consecutive African Americans have been crowned. McCullough represented the United States at the Miss Universe 2017 competition, placed in the top 10. This is the first back to back win for a state at Miss USA since Texas won the crown in 1988 and 1989.

== Background ==
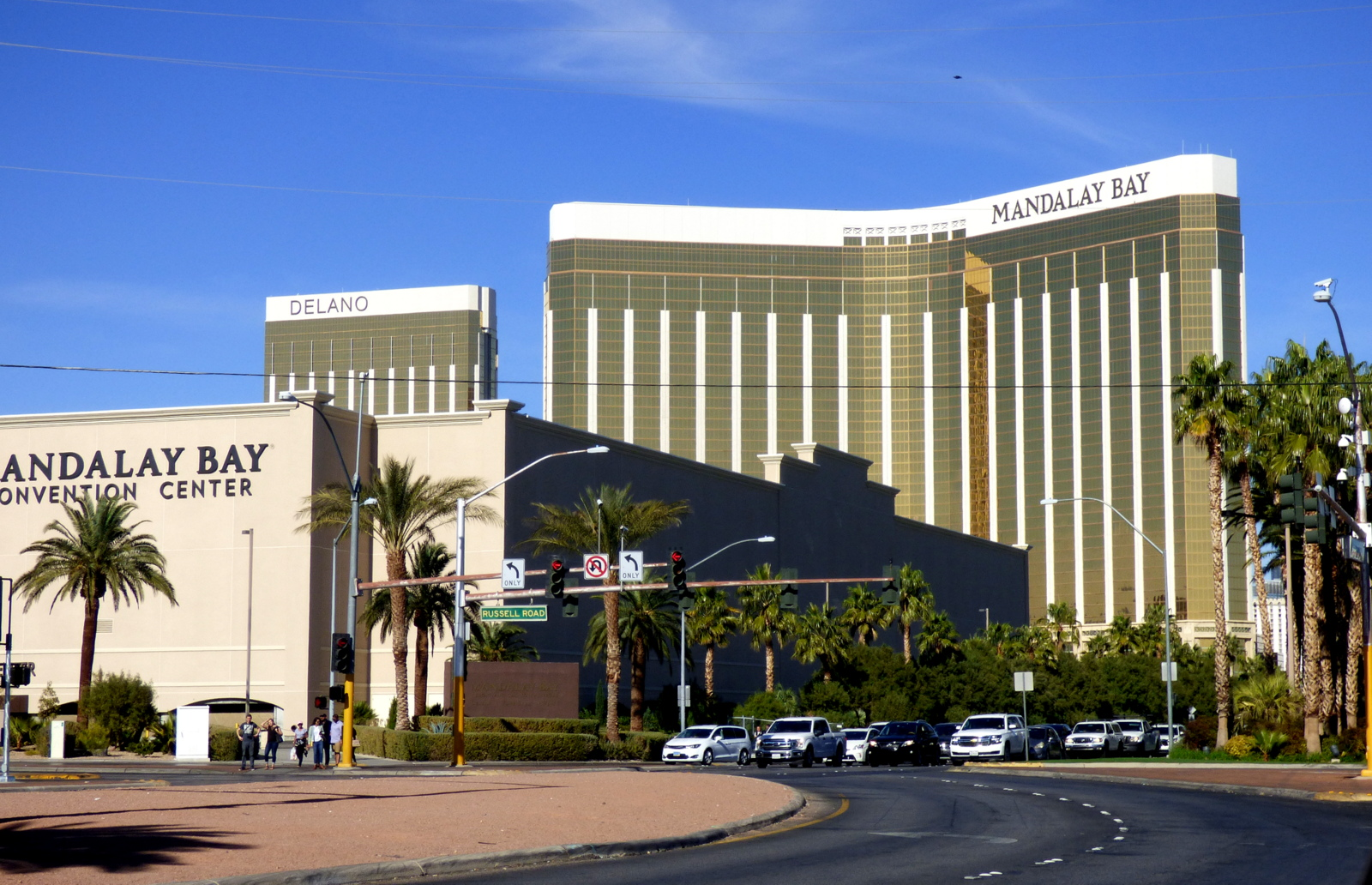
Mandalay Bay Events Center in Las Vegas, Nevada, the host venue of Miss USA 2017 competition.

=== Selection of participants ===
Delegates from 50 states and the District of Columbia were selected in state pageants began in July 2016 and ended in February 2017. The first state pageant was Florida, held on July 16, 2016, and the final pageant was Alaska, held on February 4, 2017; eight of them were former Miss Teen USA state winners, three of them were former Miss America state titleholders and one of them was a former Miss America's Outstanding Teen state titleholder.

One state titleholder was appointed as replacement after the original titleholder was unable to compete. Génesis Dávila was the original winner of Miss Florida USA 2017, she was disqualified shortly after winning the title and was revealed she hired professional makeup artists instead by to do herself. She was replaced by Linette De Los Santos, the first runner-up of Miss Florida USA 2017 pageant. Dávila would later win the title the following year and competed in Miss USA 2018.

== Results ==
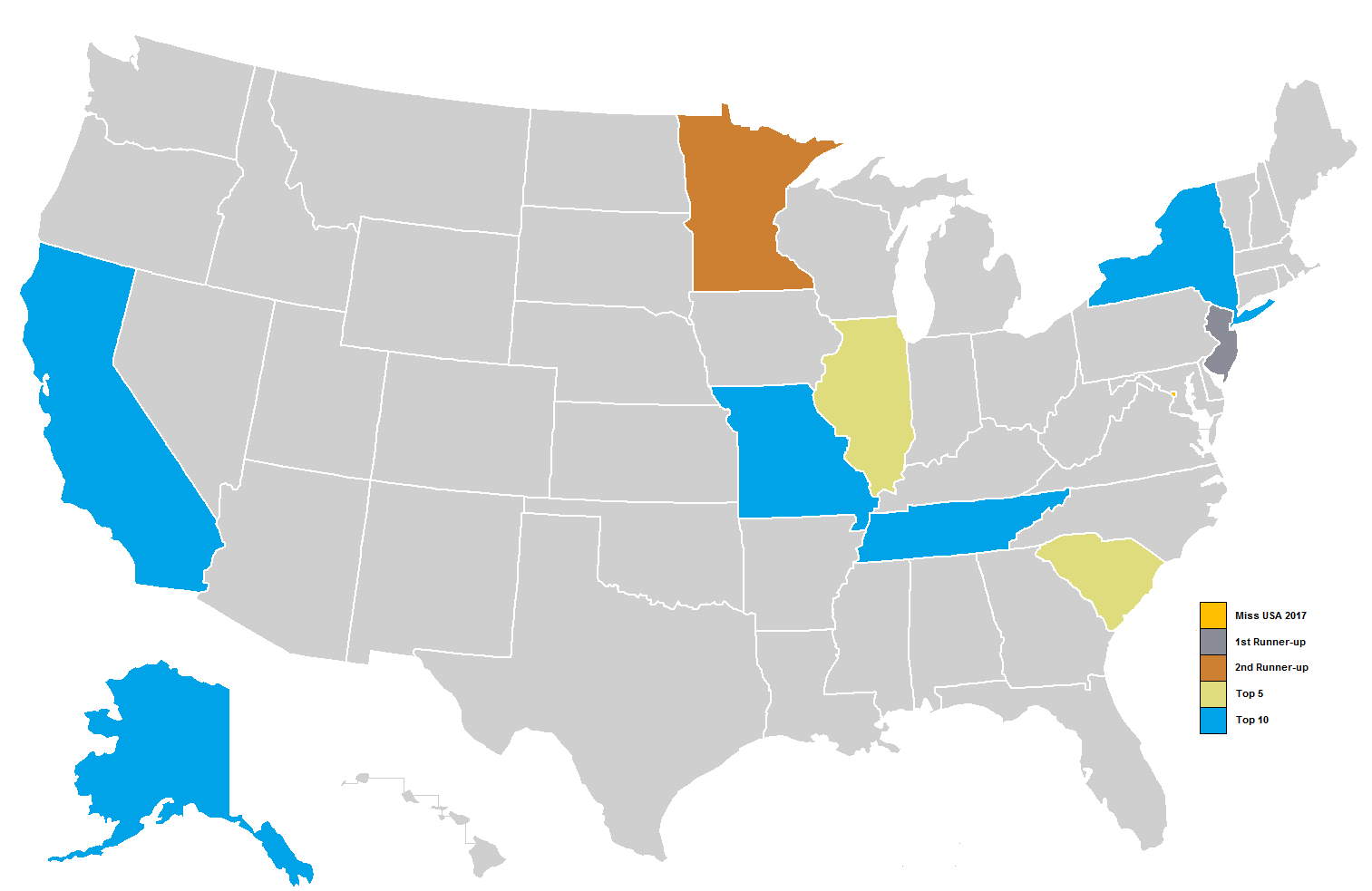
Miss USA 2017 results.

Placement	Contestant
Miss USA 2017	District of Columbia – Kára McCullough
1st Runner-Up	New Jersey – Chhavi Verg
2nd Runner-Up	Minnesota – Meridith Gould
Top 5	Illinois – Whitney Wandland; South Carolina – Megan Gordon
Top 10	Alaska – Alyssa London; California – India Williams; Missouri – Bayleigh Dayton; New York – Hannah Lopa; Tennessee – Allee-Sutton Hethcoat

=== Awards ===
Award	Contestant
Miss Congeniality	Missouri – Bayleigh Dayton; Wyoming – Mikaela Shaw

== Pageant ==
=== Preliminary competition ===
Prior to the final competition, the delegates compete in the preliminary competition, which involves private interviews with the judges and a presentation show where they compete in swimsuit and evening gown. It was held on May 11, 2017 on the official Miss USA YouTube channel and was hosted by Entertainment reporter and Miss Wisconsin USA 2009 Alex Wehrley and Deshauna Barber.

==== Judges ====
- Halima Aden – Somali-American model and first woman to compete in a Miss USA state pageant wearing a hijab and burkini
- Maura McGreevy – IMG corporate community
- Carole Gist – Miss USA 1990
- Nancy Lublin – CEO of Crisis Text Line
- Brook Lee – Miss USA 1997 and Miss Universe 1997
- Nick Light – Vice president of Sony Music and Warner Bros. Records
- Vanessa Gringer – Director of business development at IMG

=== Finals ===
For the first time since 2003, the number of finalists decreased to 10 from 15 in the previous year. The top 10 finalists compete in both swimsuit and evening gown, while the top 5 are in a qualifying question, and the final 3 are subjected in the final question round and a final runway, the winner is decided by a panel of judges.

==== Judges ====
- Halima Aden – Somali-American model and first woman to compete in a Miss USA state pageant wearing a hijab and burkini
- Carson Kressley – TV personality, style expert, fashion designer and author
- Brook Lee – Miss USA 1997 and Miss Universe 1997
- Nancy Lublin – Founder of Dress for Success
- Jeannie Mai – Style expert, philanthropist, and co-host of The Real
- Janet Mock – Author, television host and advocate

== Contestants ==
Contestant stats provided via the Miss Universe Organization.

State/district	Name	Age	Hometown	Placement	Notes
Alabama	Baylee Smith	20	Tuscaloosa		
Alaska	Alyssa London	27	Anchorage	Top 10	First Tlingit Miss Alaska USA
Arizona	Tommy Lynn Calhoun	27	Tucson		
Arkansas	Arynn Johnson	20	Hot Springs		Previously Miss Arkansas Teen USA 2015
California	India Williams	20	Lafayette	Top 10	
Colorado	Sabrina Janssen	21	Denver		
Connecticut	Olga Litvinenko	27	Greenwich		Previously Miss Connecticut Teen USA 2007
Delaware	Mia Jones	21	Bear		Previously Miss Delaware Teen USA 2014
District of Columbia	Kára McCullough	25	Washington, D.C.	Miss USA 2017	
Florida	Linette De Los Santos	25	Miami		
Georgia	DeAnna Johnson	21	Hazlehurst		Top 10 finalist on season eight of The Voice
Hawaii	Julie Kuo	23	Honolulu		
Idaho	Cassie Lewis	26	Moscow		
Illinois	Whitney Wandland	25	Chicago	Top 5	Chicago Bulls Luvabull
Indiana	Brittany Winchester	27	Indianapolis		
Iowa	Kelsey Weier	26	West Des Moines		Contestant on season 24 of The Bachelor and season 7 of Bachelor in Paradise
Kansas	Catherine Carmichael	26	Manhattan		Previously Miss Kansas World America 2015
Kentucky	Madelynne Myers	22	Louisville		
Louisiana	Bethany Trahan	21	Lake Charles		
Maine	Brooke Harris	26	Lee		
Maryland	Adrianna David	22	Rockville		Later Miss Maryland 2018
Massachusetts	Julia Scaparotti	24	Peabody		New England Patriots Cheerleader; Later a contestant on Game of Clones and Beat Shazam
Michigan	Krista Ferguson	24	Detroit		
Minnesota	Meridith Gould	22	Minneapolis	2nd Runner-up	Previously Miss South Dakota's Outstanding Teen 2012; Previously Miss South Dakota 2014
Mississippi	Ashley Hamby	24	Madison		
Missouri	Bayleigh Dayton	23	Lee's Summit	Top 10	First African-American Miss Missouri USA; Later a HouseGuest on Big Brother 20
Montana	Brooke Bezanson	20	Missoula		
Nebraska	Jasmine Fuelberth	20	Norfolk		Previously Miss Nebraska Teen USA 2013
Nevada	Lauren York	23	Primm		
New Hampshire	Sarah Mousseau	26	Portsmouth		
New Jersey	Chhavi Verg	20	Edison	1st Runner-up	
New Mexico	Ashley Mora	25	Albuquerque		Previously Miss New Mexico World 2015
New York	Hannah Lopa	25	Spencerport	Top 10	
North Carolina	Katie Coble	27	Charlotte		Previously Miss North Carolina Teen USA 2007
North Dakota	Raquel Wellentin	24	Fargo		
Ohio	Dinaleigh Baxter	24	Winchester		
Oklahoma	Alex Smith	20	Mooreland		
Oregon	Elizabeth Denny	26	Roseburg		
Pennsylvania	Cassandra Angst	23	Feasterville		
Rhode Island	Kelsey Swanson	23	Cranston		
South Carolina	Megan Gordon	23	North Augusta	Top 5	Later Miss South Carolina World 2019
South Dakota	Tessa Dee	26	Mitchell		Previously Miss South Dakota 2013
Tennessee	Allee-Sutton Hethcoat	25	Franklin	Top 10	
Texas	Nancy Gonzalez	27	Freeport		
Utah	Baylee Jensen	23	South Jordan		Daughter of Miss USA 1989 Gretchen Polhemus
Vermont	Madison Cota	21	Bellows Falls		Previously Miss Vermont Teen USA 2014
Virginia	Jacqueline Carroll	23	Stanardsville		Previously Miss Virginia Teen USA 2010
Washington	Alex Carlson-Helo	23	Mill Creek		Previously Miss Washington Teen USA 2012
West Virginia	Lauren Roush	22	Mason		Later a contestant of Are You the One? season 7 Later Miss Pennsylvania World 2019
Wisconsin	Skylar Witte	19	Schofield		
Wyoming	Mikaela Shaw	23	Casper		Previously Miss Wyoming 2015

== International broadcasters ==
=== Television ===
- United States: Fox
- Africa: DSTV Mzansi Magic (delayed broadcast)
- Asia-Pacific: Star World
- Venezuela: Venevisión

== General references ==
- "Miss USA 2017 Results". missuniverse.com. IMG Universe. May 15, 2017. Archived from the original on May 17, 2017.
