= Last Squad Standing =

Last Squad Standing is a competition reality television series that premiered on Oxygen Media where three groups of friends from across America live together and compete in a series of physical challenges for a chance to take home $100,000. Each week, the losing team is forced to determine which members of the squad will be put up for elimination, and members of the winning team then vote for who leaves. At the end of the season, the squad that has the most members remaining earns the grand prize. Among the squads is Ciera Nicole Butts, Miss District of Columbia USA 2014.

Contestants	Team Name	Outcome	Place
Ciera, Colby, Davrielle, Fred, Ivy	The Empire	1st	
Mike, Armond, Charmaine, Nastashia, Nikia	The Detroit Players	2nd	
Caroline, Kaitlyn, Jay, Steven, Gia	Jersey Bosses	3rd	

Ep	Title	Air Date	Viewers (Millions)	Eliminated	
1	Ride or Die	November 1, 2016	N/A	Steven	
2	For Love or Squad	November 8, 2016	N/A	Ivy	
3	Frenemies	November 15, 2016	N/A	Fred	
4	Game On	November 22, 2016	N/A	Caroline	Armond
5	Girl Code	November 29, 2016	N/A	Colby	
6	Squad is Crumbling	December 6, 2016	N/A	Ciera	Nastashia
7	Bros Before Squads	December 13, 2016	N/A	Nikia	
8	Getting Played	December 20, 2016	N/A	Gia	
9	The Bitch is Back	December 27, 2016	N/A	Charmaine	Kaitlyn
10	The $100,000 Decision	January 3, 2017	N/A		
