= Sonya Robinson =

American musician and songwriter (born 1959)

- Born: July 29, 1959 (age 67)
- Occupation: Violinist
- Beauty pageant titleholder
- Title: Miss Black America (1983)

Sonya L. Robinson (born July 29, 1959) is an American musician and songwriter.

== Background ==
Sonya Robinson is a graduate of Nicolet High School in Milwaukee, Wisconsin and the University of Wisconsin Milwaukee. In 1983, she was crowned Miss Black America.

== Recording Artist ==
In 1987, she released her first CD, entitled "Sonya" on Columbia Records. It was produced by Jean-Paul Bourelly.

Miles Davis once compared her violin playing to Stuff Smith and Ray Nance.
