= Chelsea Hardin =

American model, public speaker, and beauty pageant titleholder

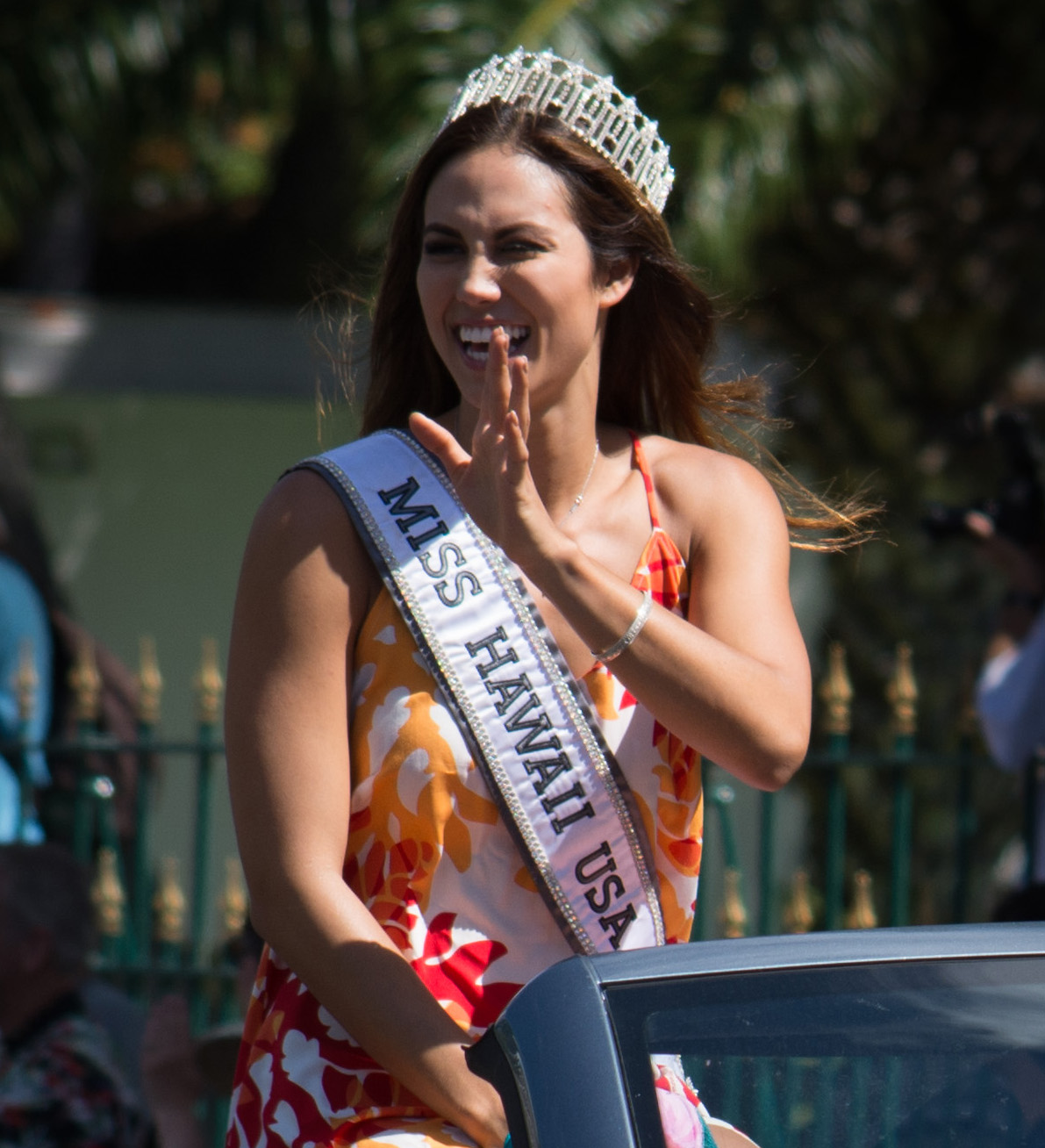
- Born: Chelsea Keolani Hardin; September 5, 1991 (age 35); Honolulu, Hawaii, U.S.
- Education: ʻIolani School
- Alma mater: California Polytechnic State University
- Height: 5 ft 11 in (180 cm)
- Beauty pageant titleholder
- Title: Miss Hawaii USA 2016
- Hair color: Brown
- Eye color: Brown
- Major competitions: Miss Hawaii USA 2016 (Winner); Miss USA 2016 (1st Runner-Up)

Chelsea Keolani Hardin (born September 5, 1991) is an American model, public speaker, and beauty pageant titleholder who was crowned Miss Hawaii USA 2016. She was the first runner-up to Deshauna Barber of District of Columbia at Miss USA 2016.

== Early life ==
Hardin was born on September 5, 1991, in Honolulu, Hawaii. She is of Native Hawaiian, Chinese, Filipino, Portuguese, Spanish, Dutch, Irish, English, French, and Scandinavian descent. Her father Kevin Hardin is a Hawaiian Airlines pilot, while her mother Christine Mitchell is a real estate agent. Hardin attended the ʻIolani School and later California Polytechnic State University in San Luis Obispo, California. While a university student, she played NCAA Division I women's volleyball.

== Pageantry ==
=== Miss Hawaii USA 2016 ===
Hardin represented East Oahu at Miss Hawaii USA 2016 on November 22, 2015, and was crowned the winner by outgoing titleholder Emma Wo.

=== Miss USA 2016 ===
On June 5, 2016, Hardin competed in the Miss USA 2016 pageant in Las Vegas, Nevada. She went on to place as the first runner-up to winner Deshauna Barber of District of Columbia, despite being the favorite to win.

The pageant garnered some controversy due to the question Hardin was asked by the judges during the final question portion of the pageant, which was if she'd vote for Hillary Clinton or Donald Trump during the 2016 United States presidential election. The question was criticized by numerous members of the media for being invasive, while the live audience booed after hearing what Hardin had been asked.

Awards and achievements
| Preceded by Emma Wo | Miss Hawaii USA; 2016 | Succeeded by Julie Kuo |
| Preceded by (Texas) Ylianna Guerra | Miss USA 1st Runner-Up; 2016 | Succeeded by (New Jersey) Chavvi Verg |
