= Deshauna Barber =

American model and U.S. Army officer (born 1989)

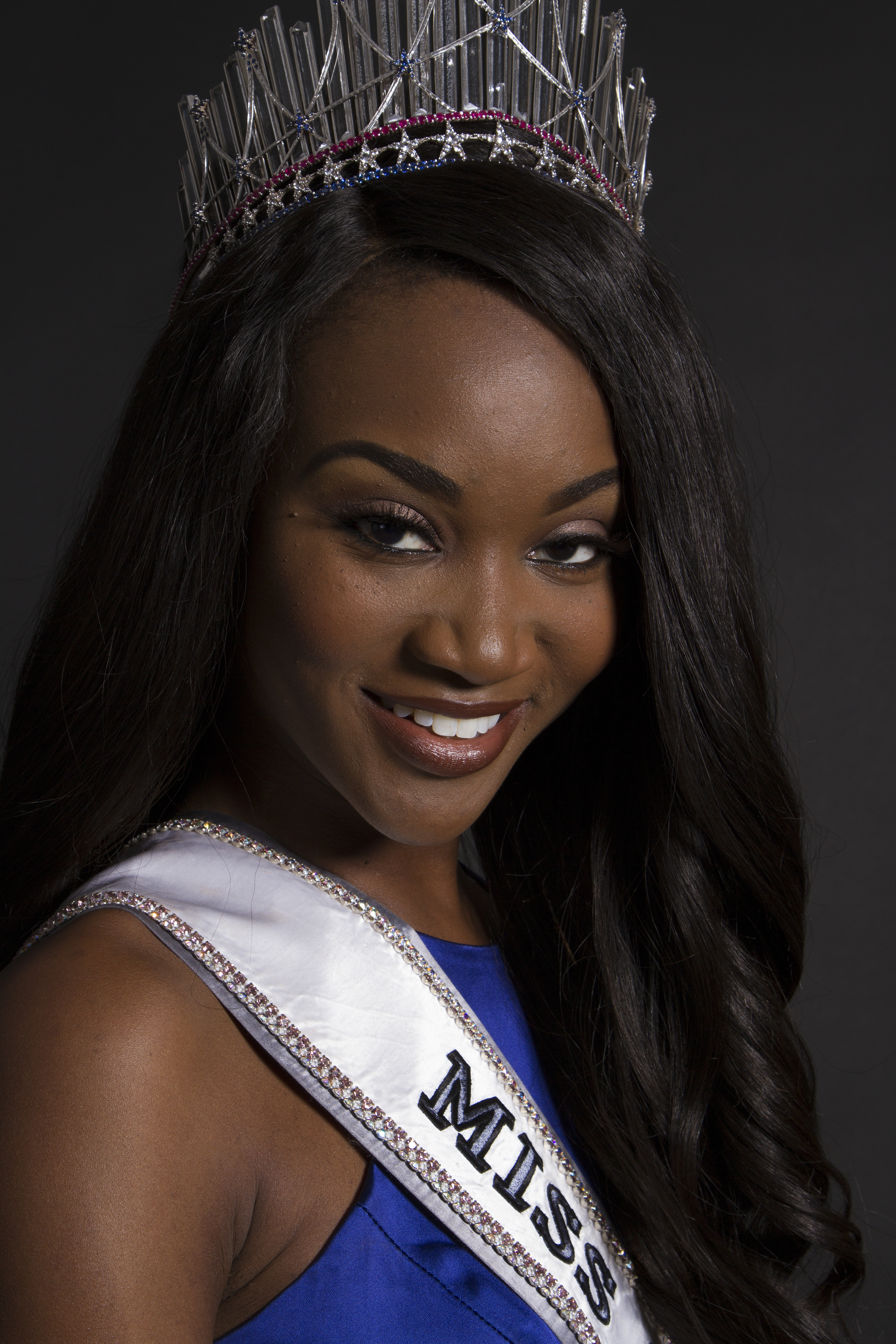
- Barber as Miss USA 2016
- Born: December 6, 1989 (age 36); Columbus, Georgia, U.S.
- Education: Virginia State University (BS); University of Maryland University College (MS)
- Occupations: Beauty pageant titleholder; motivational speaker
- Height: 5 ft 10 in (178 cm)
- Spouse: Marvin Echols III (m. 2023)
- Beauty pageant titleholder
- Title: Miss District of Columbia USA 2016; Miss USA 2016
- Hair color: Black
- Eye color: Brown
- Major competitions: Miss USA 2016 (Winner); Miss Universe 2016 (Top 9)
- Military career
- Allegiance: United States
- Branch: United States Army Reserve
- Service years: Since 2011
- Rank: Captain
- Unit: 988th Quartermaster Detachment

Deshauna Barber (born December 6, 1989) is an American motivational speaker, beauty pageant titleholder and captain in the United States Army Reserve. On June 5, 2016, she was crowned Miss USA 2016 by the outgoing titleholder Olivia Jordan of Oklahoma. She represented the United States at the Miss Universe 2016 pageant and finished as a Top 9 finalist. She's also the first United States military member to win the Miss USA pageant.

== Early life and education ==
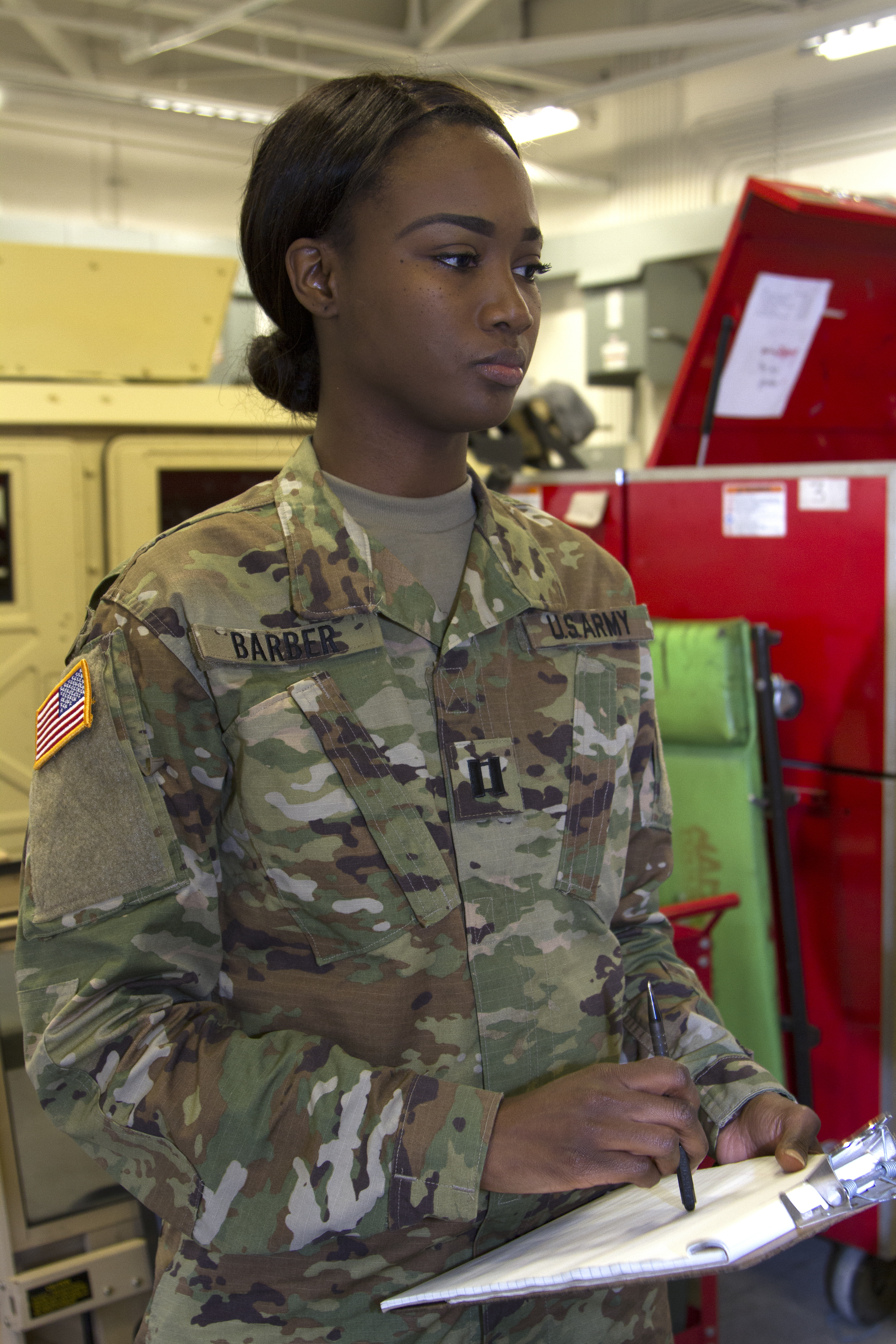
Barber tours the motor pool at the Army Reserve Center Fort Totten, 2016

Barber was born on December 6, 1989, in Columbus, Georgia, to Darren Barber and Cordelia Barber, both military veterans. She was a military brat, moving due to her father's 20-year military career in the Green Berets to North Carolina, Nebraska, Minnesota, Virginia, and Washington, D.C. Barber joined the United States Army Reserve at age 17. She attended Virginia State University and graduated with a degree in business management. She is a member of the Sigma Gamma Rho sorority.

Prior to becoming Miss USA, Barber was commissioned in 2011 and was assigned as a quartermaster officer. She became a logistics commander in the U.S. Army Reserve as a captain, and worked as an IT analyst for the United States Department of Commerce. She earned her master's degree in management information systems and services from University of Maryland University College. In May 2022, she was awarded an honorary Doctor of Leadership from Norwich University.

== Pageantry ==
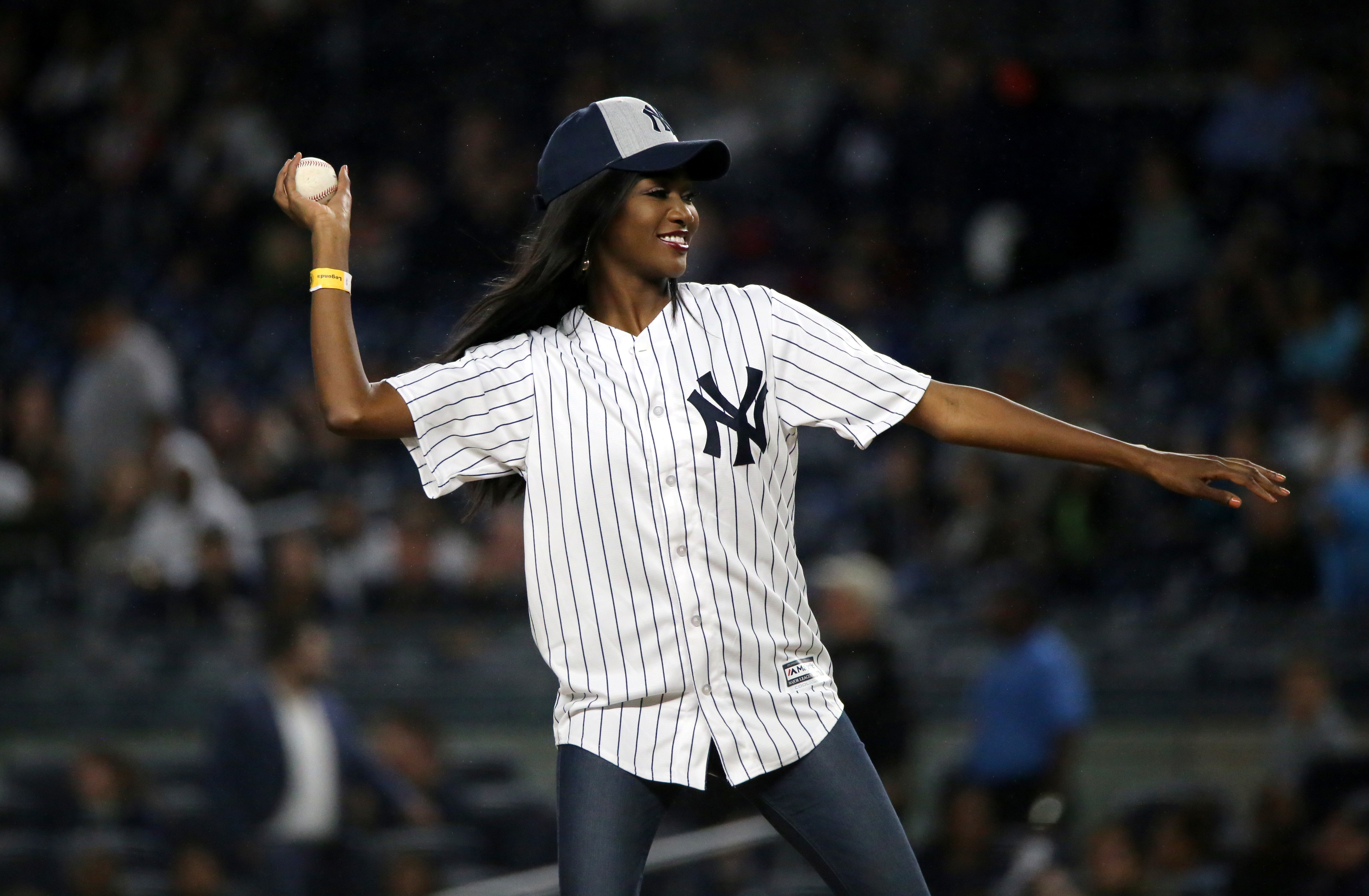
Barber throws out the first pitch at Yankee Stadium

Barber was crowned Miss District of Columbia USA 2016 on December 19, 2015, by outgoing titleholder Lizzy Olsen. Prior to winning this pageant she had placed in the semi-finalists of the Miss Virginia USA 2010 and Miss District of Columbia USA 2015 pageants and held the Miss Virginia International 2011 title.

On June 5, 2016, Barber competed in the Miss USA 2016 pageant in Las Vegas, Nevada. She went on to win the competition, beating out first runner-up Chelsea Hardin of Hawaii and second runner-up Emanii Davis from Georgia. She was crowned by outgoing Miss USA, Olivia Jordan of Oklahoma. She was the third Miss District of Columbia USA to win the Miss USA title and the first in fourteen years and also the first African American to win the Miss USA title since Crystle Stewart in 2008. She is the ninth African American to win the competition since its founding. Barber was additionally the first member of the military to win the Miss USA title and declared her intentions to promote veterans issues during her reign. Barber represented the US at Miss Universe 2016 in Manila where she placed in the top nine. During the national costume competition, she wore a superhero-inspired metallic silver costume complete with a helmet and an eagle-crested shield, which stood for women's empowerment. However the wings of her costume failed to open when she was onstage, leaving her sheepishly smiling and tugging on the strings for a while.

After completing her reign, Barber later crowned Kára McCullough, also of the District of Columbia, as her successor at the Miss USA 2017 competition on May 14, 2017, held in Las Vegas.

As of 2020, she is the CEO of Service Women's Action Network (SWAN), an advocacy NGO on women soldiers and veterans. Barber teaches at Howard University. and is also a motivational speaker, focusing on bullying, sexual abuse, and loss, having presented at Google and the Georgetown University and University of Maryland commencement exercises.

== Personal life ==
In October 2020, Barber began dating Marvin Echols III. The couple became engaged in December 2022, and later married in December 2023.

Awards and achievements
Preceded by Lizzy Olsen	Miss District of Columbia USA; 2016	Succeeded by Jasmine Jones
Preceded by Olivia Jordan	Miss USA; 2016	Succeeded by Kára McCullough
