= Miss District of Columbia Teen USA =

Beauty pageant competition

- Formation: 1983
- Type: Beauty pageant
- Headquarters: Washington, D.C.
- Location: District of Columbia
- Members: Miss Teen USA
- Official language: English
- Key people: Emanii Causby (Executive Director)
- Website: Official website

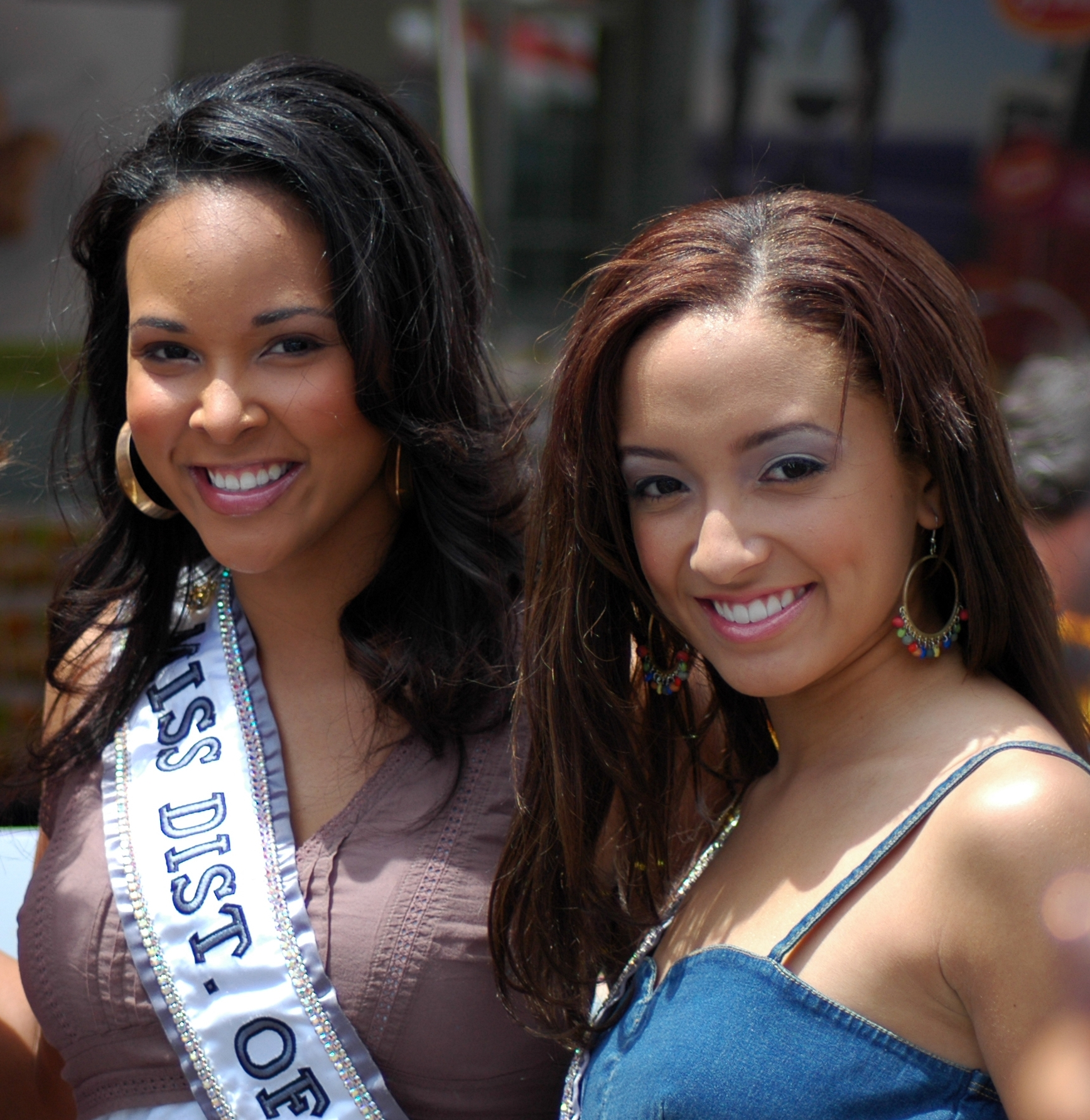
Mercedes Lindsay, Miss District of Columbia USA 2007 and Jasmine Alexis, Miss District of Columbia Teen USA 2007

The Miss District of Columbia Teen USA competition is the pageant that selects the representative for the District of Columbia in the Miss Teen USA pageant.

With only five semi-finalist placings and one runner-up, the District of Columbia is one of the least successful states at Miss Teen USA. One of those semi finalists, Miss District of Columbia Teen USA 2000 Tiara Dews, was one of only three District of Columbia teens to win the Miss District of Columbia USA crown.

Blake Hart of Meridian, MS was crowned Miss District of Columbia Teen USA 2026 on July 3, 2026, at McKinley Tech High School in Washington, D.C.. She will represent District of Columbia at Miss Teen USA 2026.

== Results summary ==
=== Placements ===
- 1st runner-up: Hannah Gillard (2021)
- Top 10: Ni'Cole Bobbitt (1987), Tiara Dews (2000), Jacqueline Drakeford (2001)
- Top 20: Asia Chisley (2023), Chelsea Chambers (2024), Sarah Eyasu (2025)

District of Columbia holds a record of 7 placements at Miss Teen USA.

=== Awards ===
- Miss Congeniality: Shirelle Robinson (1990)

== Winners ==
- Declared as Winner
- Ended as runner-up
- Ended as one of the finalists or semifinalists

| Year | Name | Hometown | Age^{1} | Local title | Placement | Special awards | Notes |
|---|---|---|---|---|---|---|---|
| 2026 | Blake Hart | Meridian, MS | 19 | | | | Previously Miss District of Columbia's Teen 2025; 4th runner-up at Miss America's Teen 2026 |
| 2025 | Sarah Eyasu | Clarksville, MD | 17 | | Top 20 | | |
| 2024 | Chelsea Chambers | Washington, D.C. | 19 | Miss Bloomingdale Teen | Top 20 | | |
| 2023 | Asia Chisley | Washington, D.C. | 17 | Miss Cherry Blossom Teen | Top 20 | | |
| 2022 | Asia Hickman | Washington, D.C. | 18 | Miss Cherry Blossom Teen | | | Previously Miss New York's Outstanding Teen 2017 |
| 2021 | Hannah Gilliard | Washington, D.C. | 16 | Miss Crestwood Teen | 1st runner-up | | |
| 2020 | Sydney Jackson | Washington, D.C. | 18 | Miss Dupont Circle Teen | | | |
| 2019 | Jaclyn Davis | Washington, D.C. | 18 | | | | Later USA National Miss 2022 |
| 2018 | Madison Chambers | Washington, D.C. | 18 | | | | |
| 2017 | Karis Felton | Washington, D.C. | 17 | | | | |
| 2016 | Dylan Murphy | Washington, D.C. | 17 | | | | |
| 2015 | Niara Iman (Tarleton-Allen) | Washington, D.C. | 17 | | | | |
| 2014 | Dominick Fink | Washington, D.C. | 17 | | | | Previously Miss Virginia's Outstanding Teen 2011 |
| 2013 | Despina Ades | Washington, D.C. | 19 | | | | Previously Miss Teen Illinois Galaxy 2011 |
| 2012 | Sierra Hadley | Washington, D.C. | 18 | | | | |
| 2011 | Imani Bentham | Washington, D.C. | 19 | | | | |
| 2010 | Jeneffer Lopez | Washington, D.C. | 17 | | | | |
| 2009 | Jessica Nowlin | Washington, D.C. | 17 | | | | |
| 2008 | Ivana Grace | Washington, D.C. | 16 | | | | |
| 2007 | Jasmine Alexis | Washington, D.C. | 16 | | | | Assumed the title after winner Ava Goldson relinquished title; Later Miss District of Columbia's Outstanding Teen 2008; Top 10 at Miss America's Outstanding Teen 2009; Crowned the first Miss Black USA Talented Teen 2009 |
| 2007 | Ava Goldson | Washington, D.C. | | | Did not compete | | Resigned to attend Spelman College |
| 2006 | Jasmine Niernberger | Washington, D.C. | 17 | | | | |
| 2005 | Danai Mattison | Washington, D.C. | 18 | | | | |
| 2004 | Nicole White | Washington, D.C. | 16 | | | | Later Miss District of Columbia USA 2009 |
| 2003 | Natasha Prakash | Washington, D.C. | 18 | | | | |
| 2002 | Glovindria Burgess | Washington, D.C. | | | | | |
| 2001 | Jacqueline Drakeford | Washington, D.C. | 18 | | Semi-finalist | | |
| 2000 | Tiara Christen Dews | Washington, D.C. | 17 | | Semi-finalist | | Later Miss District of Columbia USA 2004; had a special relationship with during the administration of Bill Clinton, which started when she was chosen to present flowers to President Clinton in 1993. |
| 1999 | Shelly Braxton-Brooks | Washington, D.C. | | | | | |
| 1998 | Chartese De Quinta Day | Washington, D.C. | | | | | |
| 1997 | Cheri Vivette Alexander | Washington, D.C. | | | | | |
| 1996 | Shannan McCray | Washington, D.C. | | | | | |
| 1995 | Michelle Dollie Wright | Washington, D.C. | 18 | | | | Later Miss District of Columbia USA 2003 |
| 1994 | Tamara Yvette McDowell | Washington, D.C. | | | | | |
| 1993 | Rebecca Marie Slobig | Washington, D.C. | | | | | |
| 1992 | Did not compete | | | | | | |
| 1991 | Marja Allen | Washington, D.C. | | | | | |
| 1990 | Cherrelle Robinson | Washington, D.C. | | | | Miss Congeniality | |
| 1989 | Christina Patino | Washington, D.C. | | | | | |
| 1988 | Sabrina Curtis | Washington, D.C. | | | | | |
| 1987 | Ni'Cole Bobbitt | Washington, D.C. | | | Semi-finalist | | |
| 1986 | Melissa Gilbert | Washington, D.C. | | | | | |
| 1985 | Meisha Hayes | Washington, D.C. | | | | | |
| 1984 | Suzi Simpson | Washington, D.C. | | | | | |
| 1983 | Patricia Custis | Woodbrige, VA | 17 | | | | |

^{1} Age at the time of the Miss Teen USA pageant
