= Miss USA 2016 =

65th Miss USA pageant

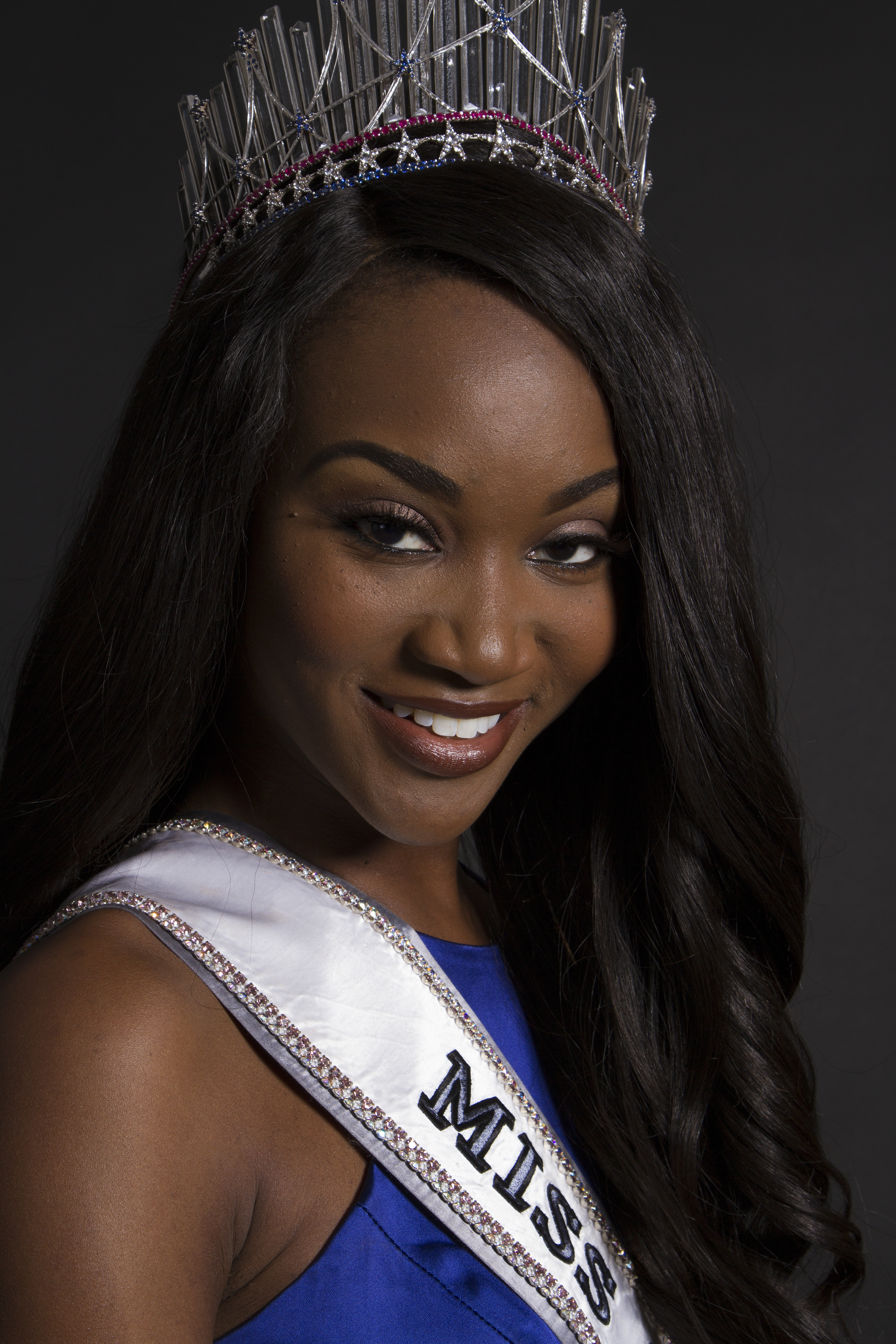
- Deshauna Barber, Miss USA 2016
- Date: June 5, 2016
- Presenters: Terrence J; Julianne Hough; Ashley Graham
- Entertainment: Nervo; Chris Young; Backstreet Boys
- Venue: T-Mobile Arena, Paradise, Nevada
- Broadcaster: Fox, KVVU-TV
- Entrants: 52 (including Miss 52 USA)
- Placements: 15
- Debuts: Miss 52 USA
- Winner: Deshauna Barber; District of Columbia
- Congeniality: Peyton Brown (Alabama)
- Photogenic: Kate Redeker (Wisconsin)

Miss USA 2016 was the 65th Miss USA pageant, held at the T-Mobile Arena in Paradise, Nevada, on June 5, 2016. Terrence J and Julianne Hough all hosted for the first time, while Ashley Graham served as the backstage host. All fifty states and the District of Columbia competed. Olivia Jordan of Oklahoma crowned her successor, Deshauna Barber of the District of Columbia, at the end of the event. Barber became the first African American to win the Miss USA title since Crystle Stewart in 2008, and this was District of Columbia's third title and the first title since 2002. Barber represented the United States at the Miss Universe 2016 pageant.

This was the first edition of the Miss USA pageant to be held under the ownership of WME/IMG, which purchased the Miss Universe Organization from Donald Trump on September 14, 2015, three days after NBCUniversal sold him its 50% interest in the organization in exchange for Trump's dropping a breach of contract lawsuit he filed against the media company in August for terminating NBC's contract to televise the Miss Universe and Miss USA pageants. It was also the first Miss USA pageant to be broadcast on Fox after signed an agreement in October 2015.

For the first time, a 52nd entrant for the pageant was decided via a nationwide search through social media voting.

== Background ==
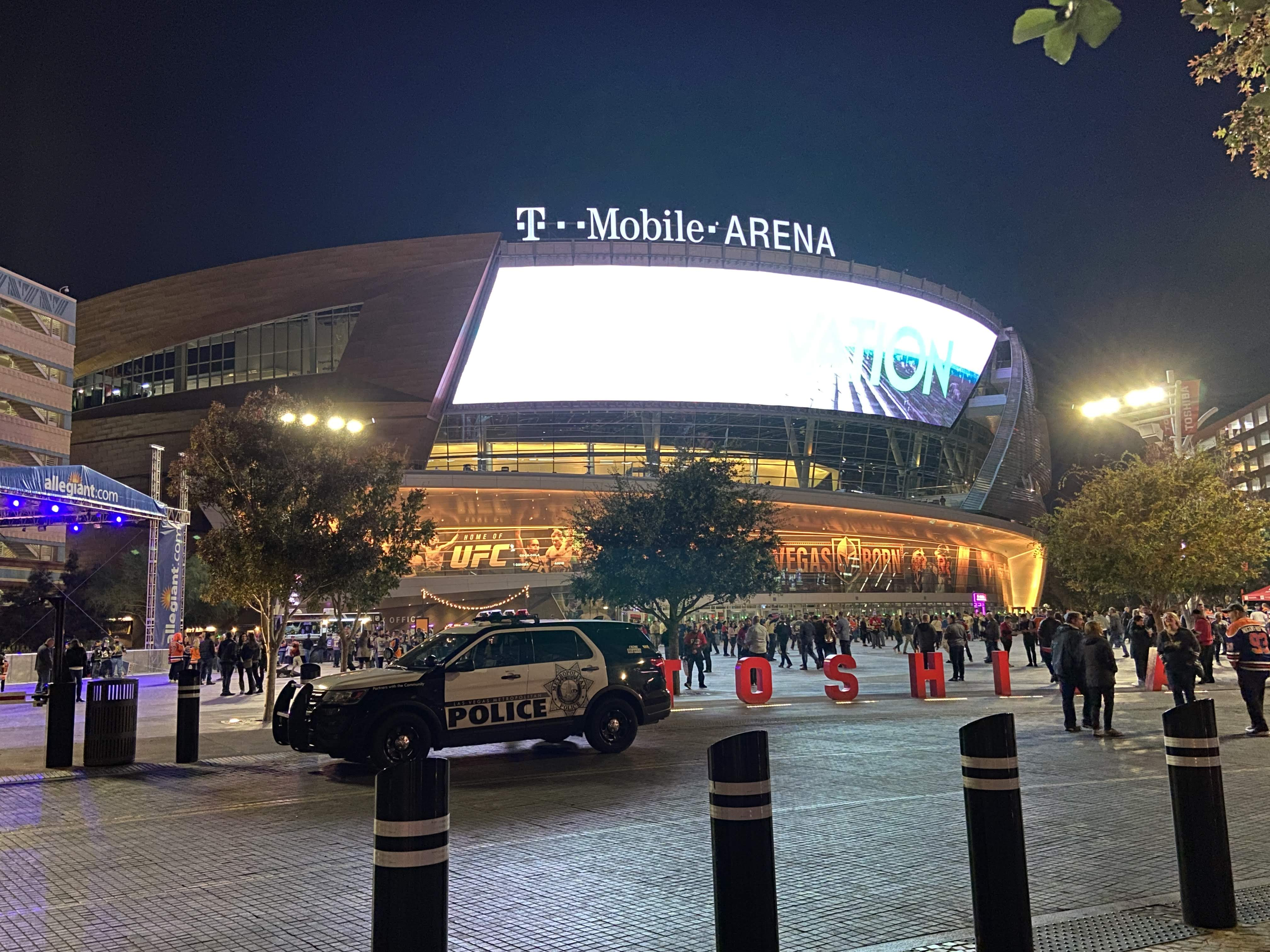
T-Mobile Arena in Las Vegas, Nevada, the host venue of Miss USA 2016 competition.

=== Location ===
On April 5, the Miss Universe Organization announced that the competition would be hosted at T-Mobile Arena in Las Vegas, and a seventh time hosting the state in nine years.

=== Hosts and performers ===
On May 25, it was announced that the competition would be hosted by Terrence J, while Ashley Graham would serve as backstage host. A week later, Julianne Hough was announced as the second host would work alongside Terrence J. Hough is a dancer and judge on Dancing with the Stars.

Also on May 25, Backstreet Boys and Nashville Star alum Chris Young were announced as the musical guests.

=== Selection of participants ===
Delegates from 50 states and the District of Columbia were chosen in state pageants held from July 2015 to January 2016. The first state pageant was Florida, held on July 11, 2015 (the day before the Miss USA 2015 final competition), and the final pageant was Kentucky, held on January 31, 2016; fifteen of these delegates were former Miss Teen USA state winners (made the highest number ever surpassed the previous number of 12 former teens in Miss USA 2014), two of them were former Miss America state winners and three of them were former Miss America's Outstanding Teen state winners.

Two state titleholders were appointed as replacements after the original titleholders were unable to compete. Stormy Keffeler, the original Miss Washington USA 2016, resigned in January 2016 after pleaded guilty from disclosure of DUI in April 2015. She was replaced by Kelsey Schmidt, who was the first runner-up of the Miss Washington USA 2016 pageant, and Allie Dunn, the original Miss North Carolina USA 2016, resigned two weeks before the start of the Miss USA 2016 competition when she was falling ill and missed the start of pageant activities prevented from entering registration form. She was replaced by Devin Gant, who was the first runner-up of Miss North Carolina USA 2016 pageant and made a last minute trip to Las Vegas as the pageant activities were already started.

== Results ==
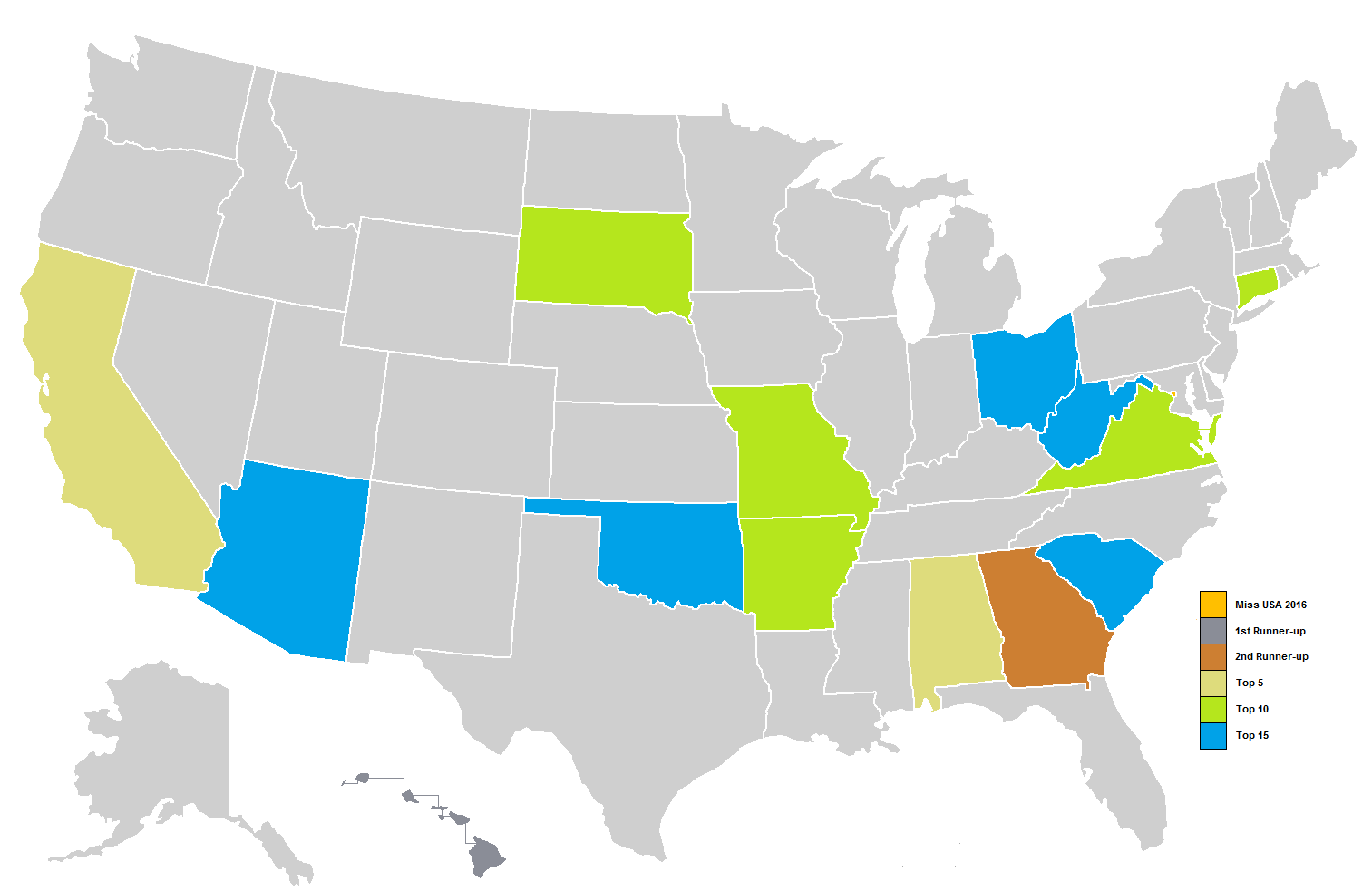
Miss USA 2016 results.

Placement	Contestant
Miss USA 2016	District of Columbia – Deshauna Barber
1st Runner-Up	Hawaii – Chelsea Hardin
2nd Runner-Up	Georgia – Emanii Davis
Top 5	Alabama – Peyton Brown; California – Nadia Mejia §
Top 10	Arkansas – Abby Floyd; Connecticut – Tiffany Teixeira; Missouri – Sydnee Stottlemyre; South Dakota – Madison McKeown; Virginia – Desi Williams
Top 15	Arizona – Chelsea Myers; Ohio – Megan Wise; Oklahoma – Taylor Gorton; South Carolina – Leah Lawson; West Virginia – Nichole Greene

§ Voted into the Top 15 by the public as the "People's Choice".

=== Awards ===
Award	Contestant
Miss Congeniality	Alabama – Peyton Brown
Miss Photogenic	Wisconsin – Kate Redeker

== Miss 52 USA ==
In May 2016, a 52nd contestant took part in the competition via social media voting. The Miss Universe Organization along with the fashion agency Sherri Hill decided to make a competition online where different women from all the US competed. Finally, 10 women were selected by a panel of judges, and these 10 finalists were revealed on May 10, 2016. The winner between these 10 candidates competed as Miss 52 USA in the Miss USA 2016 pageant on June 5, 2016. The winner was announced on May 18, 2016, and Alexandra Miller from Oklahoma City, Oklahoma was named as Miss 52 USA.

The 10 selected finalists were:

N°	Name	Age	Hometown	State
1	Catherine Williams	24	San Antonio	Texas
2	Yvonne Vega	25	New Braunfels	Texas
3	Jessica Bean	24	Casper	Wyoming
4	Alexandra Miller	26	Oklahoma City	Oklahoma
5	Ivana Thomas	22	Durham	North Carolina
6	Amanda Bell	24	Nashville	Tennessee
7	Kaitlyn Smith	26	Jacksonville Beach	Florida
8	Molly Vierhile	23	San Francisco	California
9	Niki Kafashzadeh	24	Rockville	Maryland
10	Bridgette Garb	21	Oak Park	California

The panel of judges that selected the 10 finalists were:

- Alessandra Garcia, American plus-size model.
- Ashley Wagner, American figure skater.
- Andrew Serrano, American IMG Fashion Director of Global Public Relations.
- Lauren Giraldo, American social media star.
- Pia Alonzo Wurtzbach, Miss Universe 2015 from the Philippines.
- Sherri Hill, American fashion designer and businesswoman.

== Pageant ==
=== Preliminary round ===
Prior to the final competition, the delegates competed in the preliminary competition, which involves private interviews with the judges and a presentation show where they compete in swim wear and evening gown. It was held on June 1, 2016, and was broadcast on the Miss Universe website and mobile app and was hosted by Nick Teplitz and Olivia Jordan.

==== Judges ====
- Fred Nelson – President/Executive Producer of the People's Choice Awards
- Jimmy Nguyen – Entertainment and digital media lawyer, diversity advocate, blogger, and technology advisor
- Joey Boukadakis – Writer, director, producer, and media executive
- Keltie Knight – Correspondent and weekend host of CBS's The Insider
- Kristin Conte – Marketing and communications executive and event creator
- Nick Phelps – Global Alliance Director at Droga5
- Rebecca Bienstock – West Coast Bureau Chief at Us Weekly magazine

=== Finals ===
During the final competition, the top fifteen competed in swim wear, while the top ten also competed in evening gown. The top five also competed in a submitted question round. Unlike in previous years, the third runner-up and the fourth runner-up were not awarded as the format was revived in Miss Universe 2015, and instead the judges would determine those three finalists to advance in the top three. The top three also competed in the same question round and a final runway, and the winner was decided by a panel of judges alongside the two runners-up.

==== Judges ====
- Ali Landry – Miss USA 1996 from Louisiana
- Crystle Stewart – Miss USA 2008 from Texas
- Joe Zee – Editor in Chief and Executive Creative Officer of Yahoo Fashion
- Laura Brown – Features/Special Projects and executive director of Harper's Bazaar magazine
- Nigel Barker – Fashion photographer and the host of UK and US versions of The Face

== Contestants ==
52 delegates competed for Miss USA 2016:

State	Contestant	Age (Note: Ages at the time of the pageant)	Height	Hometown	Placement	Notes
Alabama	Peyton Brown	22	5 ft 9 in (175 cm)	Eufaula	Top 5, Congeniality	Previously Miss Alabama Teen USA 2012
Alaska	Ariane Audett	21	5 ft 8 in (173 cm)	Anchorage		
Arizona	Chelsea Myers	20	5 ft 9 in (175 cm)	Tempe	Top 15	
Arkansas	Abby Floyd	20	5 ft 9 in (175 cm)	Searcy	Top 10	Previously Miss Arkansas Teen USA 2013
California	Nadia Mejia	20	5 ft 11 in (180 cm)	Diamond Bar	Top 5	Daughter of Gerardo Mejia and Miss West Virginia USA 1989 Kathy Eicher
Colorado	Caley-Rae Pavillard	22	5 ft 8 in (173 cm)	Castle Pines		Previously Miss Colorado's Outstanding Teen 2008; Previously Miss Colorado Teen USA 2011
Connecticut	Tiffany Teixeira	25	5 ft 7 in (170 cm)	Bridgeport	Top 10	Previously Miss Connecticut Teen USA 2009
Delaware	Alexandra Vorontsova	21	5 ft 7 in (170 cm)	Newark		
District of Columbia	Deshauna Barber	26	5 ft 10 in (178 cm)	Washington, D.C.	Miss USA 2016	
Florida	Brie Gabrielle	25	5 ft 9 in (175 cm)	West Palm Beach		
Georgia	Emanii Davis	22	5 ft 9 in (175 cm)	Griffin	2nd runner-up	Later placed 3rd runner-up at Miss World America 2017; Later Miss Earth USA 2019 and 1st Runner-up (Miss Earth - Air) at Miss Earth 2019
Hawaii	Chelsea Hardin	24	5 ft 11 in (180 cm)	Honolulu	1st runner-up	
Idaho	Sydney Halper	21	5 ft 9 in (175 cm)	Moscow		
Illinois	Zena Malak	24	5 ft 8 in (173 cm)	Carol Stream		
Indiana	Morgan Abel	26	5 ft 7 in (170 cm)	North Vernon		Previously Miss Indiana Teen USA 2008
Iowa	Alissa Morrison	24	5 ft 9 in (175 cm)	Davenport		
Kansas	Victoria Wiggins	26	5 ft 9 in (175 cm)	Junction City		
Kentucky	Kyle Hornback	20	5 ft 8 in (173 cm)	Louisville		
Louisiana	Maaliyah Papillion	21	5 ft 9 in (175 cm)	Lake Charles		
Maine	Marisa Butler	22	5 ft 8 in (173 cm)	Standish		Later Miss World America 2018; Later Miss Earth United States 2021; Later Miss Earth Air 2021
Maryland	Christina Denny	25	5 ft 8 in (173 cm)	Baltimore		Previously Miss Maryland 2013
Massachusetts	Whitney Sharpe	21	5 ft 5 in (165 cm)	Burlington		
Michigan	Susie Leica	26	5 ft 10 in (178 cm)	Livonia		
Minnesota	Bridget Jacobs	20	5 ft 11 in (180 cm)	Maple Grove		
Mississippi	Haley Sowers	22	5 ft 5 in (165 cm)	Meridian		Previously Miss Mississippi Teen USA 2010; Former Tennessee Titans Cheerleader
Missouri	Sydnee Stottlemyre	22	5 ft 8 in (173 cm)	Chesterfield	Top 10	Previously Miss Missouri's Outstanding Teen 2008; Previously Miss Missouri Teen USA 2011
Montana	Sibahn Doxey	23	5 ft 9 in (175 cm)	Frenchtown		Previously Miss Montana Teen USA 2011
Nebraska	Sarah Hollins	25	5 ft 8 in (173 cm)	Omaha		Previously Miss Nebraska Teen USA 2009
Nevada	Emelina Adams	24	5 ft 8 in (173 cm)	Anthem		
New Hampshire	Jessica Strohm	25	5 ft 6 in (168 cm)	Manchester		Professional cheerleader for New England Patriots
New Jersey	Jessielyn Palumbo	24	5 ft 9 in (175 cm)	Wayne		
New Mexico	Naomie Germain	22	5 ft 8 in (173 cm)	Albuquerque		
New York	Serena Bucaj	22	5 ft 9 in (175 cm)	Suffern		
North Carolina	Devin Gant	23	5 ft 6 in (168 cm)	Charlotte		Originally first runner-up, but assumed the title after winner Allie Dunn resigned before the start of pageant activities due to illness.
North Dakota	Halley Maas	22	5 ft 8 in (173 cm)	Grand Forks		
Ohio	Megan Wise	26	5 ft 10 in (178 cm)	Gallipolis	Top 15	
Oklahoma	Taylor Gorton	24	5 ft 7 in (170 cm)	Glenpool	Top 15	Previously Miss Oklahoma Teen USA 2008
Oregon	Natriana Shorter	25	5 ft 9 in (175 cm)	Eugene		
Pennsylvania	Elena LaQuatra	24	5 ft 8 in (173 cm)	Pittsburgh		Previously Miss Pennsylvania's Outstanding Teen 2007; Previously Miss Pennsylvania Teen USA 2010
Rhode Island	Theresa Agonia	24	5 ft 7 in (170 cm)	Cumberland		
South Carolina	Leah Lawson	22	5 ft 6 in (168 cm)	Anderson	Top 15	Auditioned on season 14 of American Idol but eliminated in Hollywood Week
South Dakota	Madison McKeown	21	5 ft 8 in (173 cm)	Sioux Falls	Top 10	Previously Miss South Dakota Teen USA 2014
Tennessee	Hope Stephens	20	5 ft 10 in (178 cm)	Livingston		
Texas	Daniella Rodriguez	19	5 ft 9 in (175 cm)	Laredo		Previously Miss Texas Teen USA 2013
Utah	Teale Murdock	26	5 ft 5 in (165 cm)	Salt Lake City		
Vermont	Neely Fortune	24	5 ft 7 in (170 cm)	Burlington		
Virginia	Desi Williams	26	5 ft 8 in (173 cm)	Newport News	Top 10	Previously Miss Virginia 2013; Later contestant on Survivor: Heroes vs. Healers vs. Hustlers
Washington	Kelsey Schmidt	26	5 ft 3 in (160 cm)	Bellevue		Originally first runner-up, but assumed the title after winner Stormy Keffeler resigned due to failing a DUI disclosure.
West Virginia	Nichole Greene	24	5 ft 7 in (170 cm)	Charleston	Top 15	
Wisconsin	Kate Redeker	19	5 ft 10 in (178 cm)	Sheboygan	Photogenic	Previously Miss Wisconsin Teen USA 2013
Wyoming	Autumn Olson	22	5 ft 8 in (173 cm)	Saratoga		Previously Miss Wyoming Teen USA 2013
Miss 52 USA	Alexandra Miller	26	5 ft 8 in (173 cm)	Oklahoma City, OK		Previously Miss Oklahoma USA 2015 after Olivia Jordan was crowned Miss USA 2015
