= Miss Black America =

Beauty contest

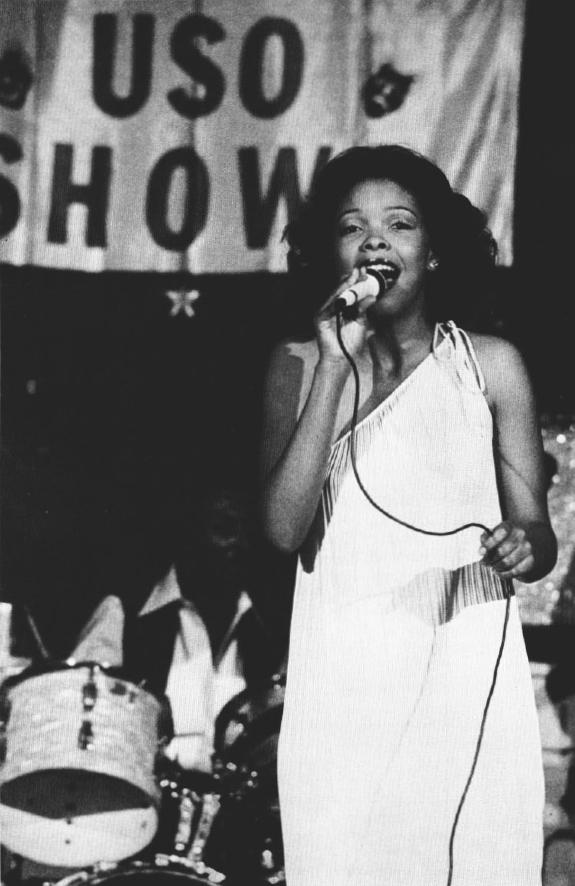
Claire Ford, 1977 Miss Black America, during a USO show, 1978

The Miss Black America beauty contest is a competition for young African-American women. The pageant has garnered the support of artists, activists and performers including Stevie Wonder, Curtis Mayfield, and Oprah Winfrey. After 40 years, in 2009 the pageant had a "kick off" in Washington, D.C. to rebrand the competition. The first teen winner was Ashley Anglin. The first runner-up teen was Monet Jackson, a resident of Mitchellville, MD; and Destiny Welch, second runner-up and also an MD resident. The adult winner was DC native and MD resident, Miss Kamilla Collier-Mullin. The first runner-up Miss Cherie A. Bryant, a northern Virginia resident; and the second runner up was Miss Janesia Simmons in the adult pageant.

== History ==
It was originally a local Philadelphia area contest to protest the lack of black women in the Miss America pageant. J. Morris Anderson created and produced the Miss Black America Pageant along with Brenda Cozart who organized and directed the pageant also serving as a beauty consultant for contestants and recruiter which started on August 17, 1968, at the Ritz-Carlton in Atlantic City. With support from Phillip H. Savage, Tri-State Director of the NAACP, the pageant received press coverage as a protest against the Miss America Pageant, an event that Mr. Savage and other NAACP leaders had long condemned for exclusion of black women contestants.

In September 1977, NBC televised the Miss Black America contest, the day before CBS televised Miss America.

== The winners ==
Year	Miss Black America	Hometown and/or home state
1968	Saundra Williams	Pennsylvania
1969	Gloria O. Smith	New York
1970	Stephanie Clark	DC
1971	Joyce Warner	Florida
1972	Linda Barney	New Jersey
1973	Arniece Russell	New York
1974	Von Gretchen Shepard	Los Angeles, California
1975	Donzeila Johnson	Pennsylvania
1976	Twanna Kilgore	Washington, D.C.
1977	Claire Ford	Memphis, Tennessee
1978	Lydia Jackson	Willingboro, New Jersey
1979	Varetta Shankle	Mississippi
1980	Sharon Wright	Chicago, Illinois
1981	Pamela Jenks	Boston, Massachusetts
1982	Susan Wells	Milwaukee, Wisconsin
1983	Sonya Robinson	Milwaukee, Wisconsin
1984	Lydia S.Garrett	Columbia, South Carolina
1985	Amina Fakir	Detroit, Michigan
1986	Rachel Oliver	Burlington, North Carolina
1987	Leila McBride	Denver, Colorado
1988	Regina Wallace	Florida
1989	Paula Gwynn	Washington DC
1990	Rosie Jones	Bridgeport, Connecticut
1991	Sharmell Sullivan	Gary, Indiana
1992	Marilyn DeShields	Virginia, Richmond
1994	Pilar Fort	Detroit, Michigan
1995	Karen D. Wallace	Oklahoma City, Oklahoma
1996	Basheerah Ahmad	Choctaw, Oklahoma
2010	Ashley Anglin-Teen	DC Metropolitan
2010	Kamilla Collier-Mullin, Adult	DC Metropolitan
2010	Natasha Ashby - Teen	Philadelphia, Pennsylvania
2010	Donielle Turner, Adult	Philadelphia, Pennsylvania
2014	Alexandra Morton, Adult	Baltimore, Maryland
2015	Jelisa Barringer, Adult	Ohio
2016	Nicole Lynette Hibbert, Adult	Delaware
2017	Brittany Lewis, Adult	District of Columbia
2018	Ryann Richardson, Adult	Brooklyn, New York
2022	Gabrielle Wilson, Adult	Los Angeles, California
2023	Ashley Myatt, Adult	Detroit, Michigan
2023	Elizabeth Dicker, Senior	Newark, New Jersey
2026	Brianna Suggs, Adult	Cincinnati, Ohio
2026	Dobreena Helm, Senior	Union, New Jersey

== In popular culture ==
- A short documentary on the Miss Black America pageant was produced by director Bayer Mack and released by Block Starz Music Television as part of its Profiles of African-American Success video series.
- In 1970, Curtis Mayfield released a track entitled "Miss Black America" on his debut album, Curtis.
- In 2021, Jennifer Holness released her documentary film, Subjects of Desire (2021) which documented "the cultural shift in North American beauty standards towards embracing Black female aesthetics" and predominantly featured prep for the 2018 pageant, and interviews with its contestants. The film premiered at SXSW and was screened in the Documentary Feature Competition.
